= Trams in Melbourne =

Tramway network in Victoria, Australia

Melbourne tramway network
- Public Transport Victoria

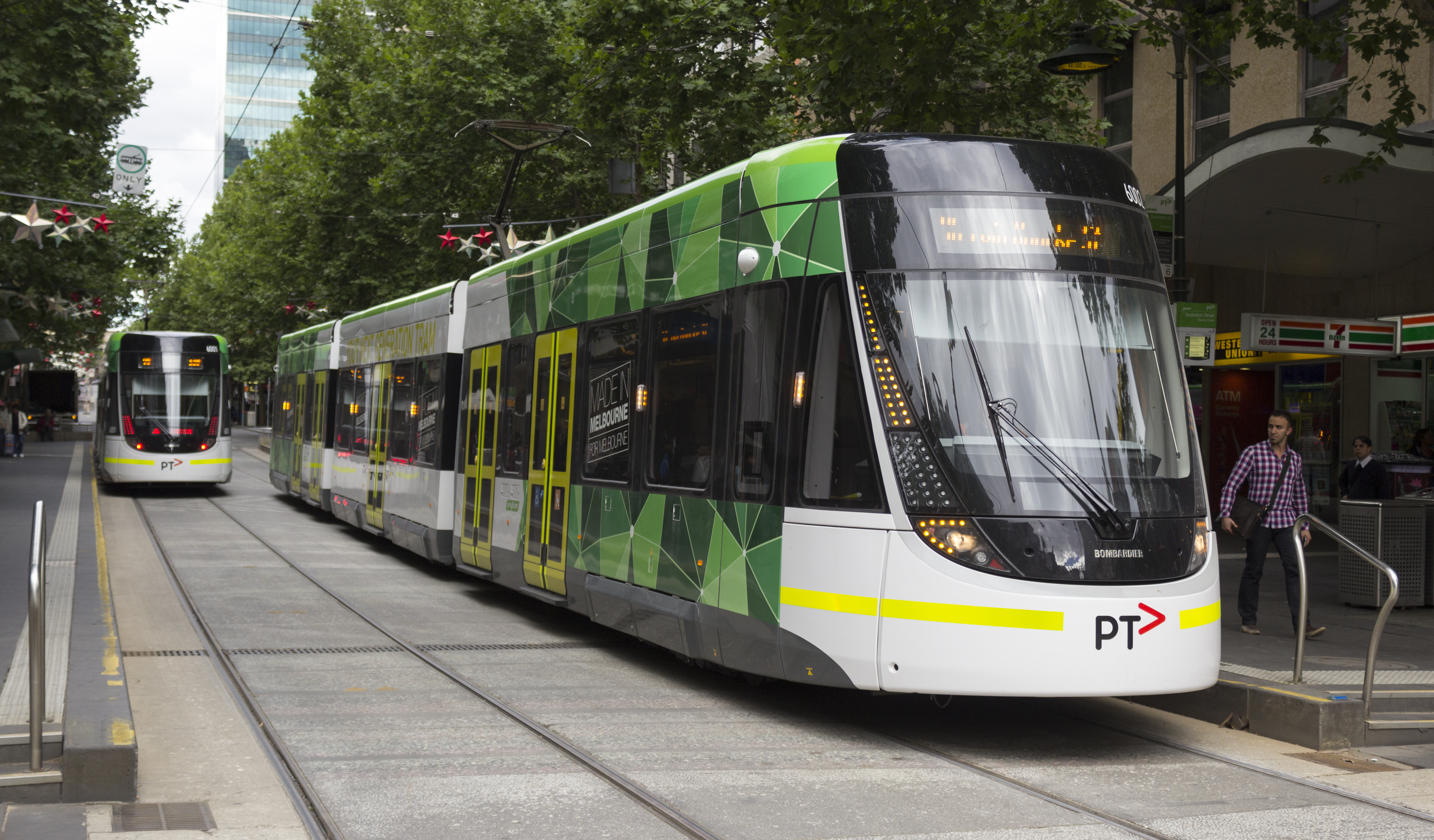
- E class trams on Bourke Street, December 2013

Operation
- Locale: Melbourne, Victoria, Australia

Infrastructure
- Track gauge: 1,435 mm (4 ft 8 1/2 in) standard gauge

Statistics
Horse tram era: 1884–1923
- Status: Abandoned or Converted to electric
- Operators: Various (1884–1915); MTOC (1887–1916); MTB (1916–1919); MMTB (1919–1923)
- Propulsion system: Horse
Cable tram era: 1885–1940
- Status: Converted to electric tram or petrol/diesel bus
- Operators: MTOC (1885–1916); Various (1890–1919); MTB (1916–1919); MMTB (1919–1940)
- Track gauge: 1,435 mm (4 ft 8 1/2 in) standard gauge
- Propulsion systems: Cable, pulled by steam engines and electric motors
Electric tram era: since 1906
- System: Metlink (2003–2012); Public Transport Victoria (since 2012)
- Status: Operational
- Routes: 24 routes
- Owners: NMETL (1906–1922); VR (1906–1959); PMTT (1910–1920); HTT (1916–1920); MBCTT (1916–1920); FNPTT (1920); MMTB (1920–1983); MTA (1983–1989); PTC (1989–1999); VicTrack (since 1999)
- Operators: NMETL (1906–1922); VR (1906–1959); PMTT (1910–1920); HTT (1916–1920); MBCTT (1916–1920); FNPTT (1920); MMTB (1920–1983); MTA (1983–1989); PTC (1989–1998); PTC (Swanston Trams) (1998–1999); PTC (Yarra Trams) (1998–1999); M>Tram (1999–2004); TransdevTSL (Yarra Trams) (1999–2009); Keolis Downer (Yarra Trams) (2009–2024); Yarra Journey Makers (Yarra Trams) (since 2024)
- Track gauge: 1,435 mm (4 ft 8 1/2 in) standard gauge 1,600 mm (5 ft 3 in) (1906–1959)
- Propulsion system: Electricity
- Electrification: 600 V DC from overhead catenary
- Depot: 9 depots
- Stock: 495 trams
- Track length (double): 250 km (155.3 mi)
- 2023-24: 154.8 million ▲4.9%
- Website: http://www.yarratrams.com.au Yarra Trams

Trams at Melbourne tram stop 14, 'Arts Precinct'
recorded 15 September 2018

The Melbourne tramway network is a tramway system serving the city of Melbourne, Victoria, Australia. The tramway network is centred around the Melbourne central business district (CBD) and consists of approximately 1,700 tram stops across 24 routes. It is the largest operational urban tram network in the world (the largest tram network ever in the world was the National Company of Light Railways in Belgium, which is no longer operational) and one of the most used, with more than 500 trams and 250 kilometres (160 miles) of double tram track. It carried 154.8 million passengers over the year 2023-24. Trams are the second most utilised form of public transport in Melbourne after the city's metropolitan commuter railway network.

Trams have operated continuously in Melbourne since 1885 (the horse tram line in Fairfield opened in 1884, but was at best an irregular service). Since then they have become a distinctive part of Melbourne's character and feature in tourism and travel advertising. Melbourne's cable tram system opened in 1885, and expanded to one of the largest in the world, with 75 kilometres (46.6 miles) of double track. The first electric tram line opened in 1889, but closed only a few years later in 1896. In 1906 electric tram systems were opened in St Kilda and Essendon, marking the start of continuous operation of Melbourne's electric trams.

Victoria's public transport system was reorganised in 1983 and saw the Melbourne & Metropolitan Tramways Board absorbed into the Metropolitan Transit Authority, which was in turn absorbed by the Public Transport Corporation in 1989. The network has been operated under contract since the commencement of franchising, following the privatisation of the Public Transport Corporation in 1999. The current private operator contracted to run Melbourne's tram system is Yarra Journey Makers, trading as Yarra Trams.

Ticketing, public information and patronage promotion are undertaken by Victoria's public transport body, Public Transport Victoria. The multi-modal integrated ticketing system, myki, currently operates across the tram network.

At some Melbourne intersections (most within the CBD), motor vehicles turning right are required to perform a hook turn, a manoeuvre designed to give trams priority. To further improve tram speeds on congested Melbourne streets, trams also have priority in road usage, with specially fitted traffic lights and exclusive lanes being provided either at all times or in peak times, as well as other measures.

== History ==
=== Horse trams ===
Melbourne's first tram was a horse tram from Fairfield railway station to a real estate development in Thornbury; it opened on 20 December 1884, and was closed by 1890. Seven horse tramlines operated in Melbourne, three were built by the Melbourne Tramway and Omnibus Company (MTOC), while the other four were built by different private companies.

The MTOC's three lines fed their cable tram system: Victoria Bridge cable tram terminus to Kew (Boroondara Cemetery), opened in 1887 and closed in 1915 after its sale to Kew Council for conversion to a Prahran and Malvern Tramways Trust electric line; Hawthorn Bridge cable tram terminus to Auburn Road, via Burwood Road, Power Street and Riversdale Road, opened in 1890 and closed on 31 January 1916 after being sold to the Hawthorn Tramways Trust for conversion to electric traction; and the Zoo line, from the Royal Parade cable line to Melbourne Zoological Gardens, opened on 10 March 1890 and closed in November 1923. The Zoo line was Melbourne's last horse tram and the only line still in operation at the formation of the Melbourne & Metropolitan Tramways Board (MMTB), however it was destroyed by fire during the 1923 police strike; the MMTB took the decision not to reopen it, thus ending Melbourne's horse tram era.

=== Cable trams ===
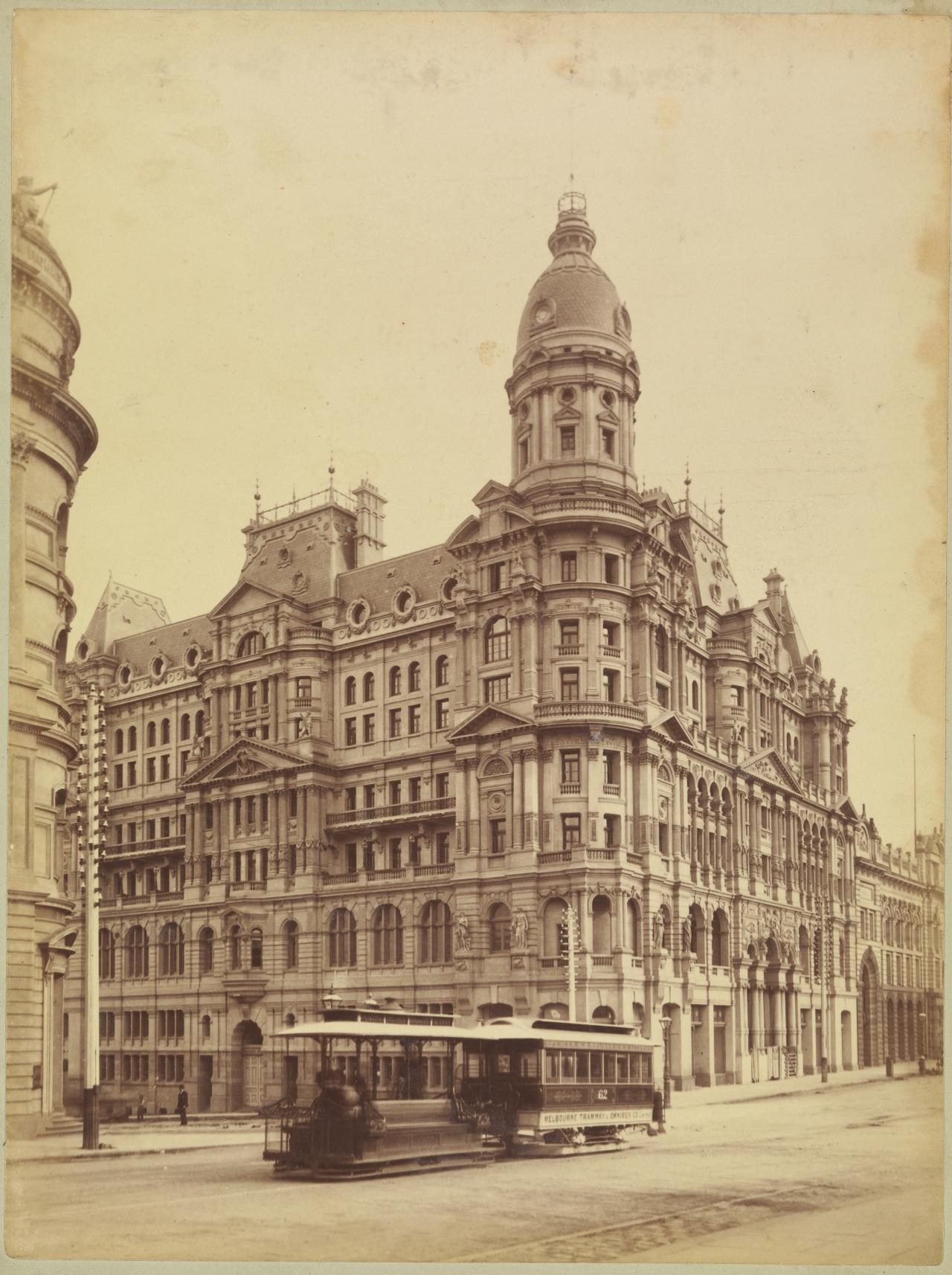
A tram car passes the Federal Coffee Palace at the south-west corner of Collins and King streets, circa 1890.

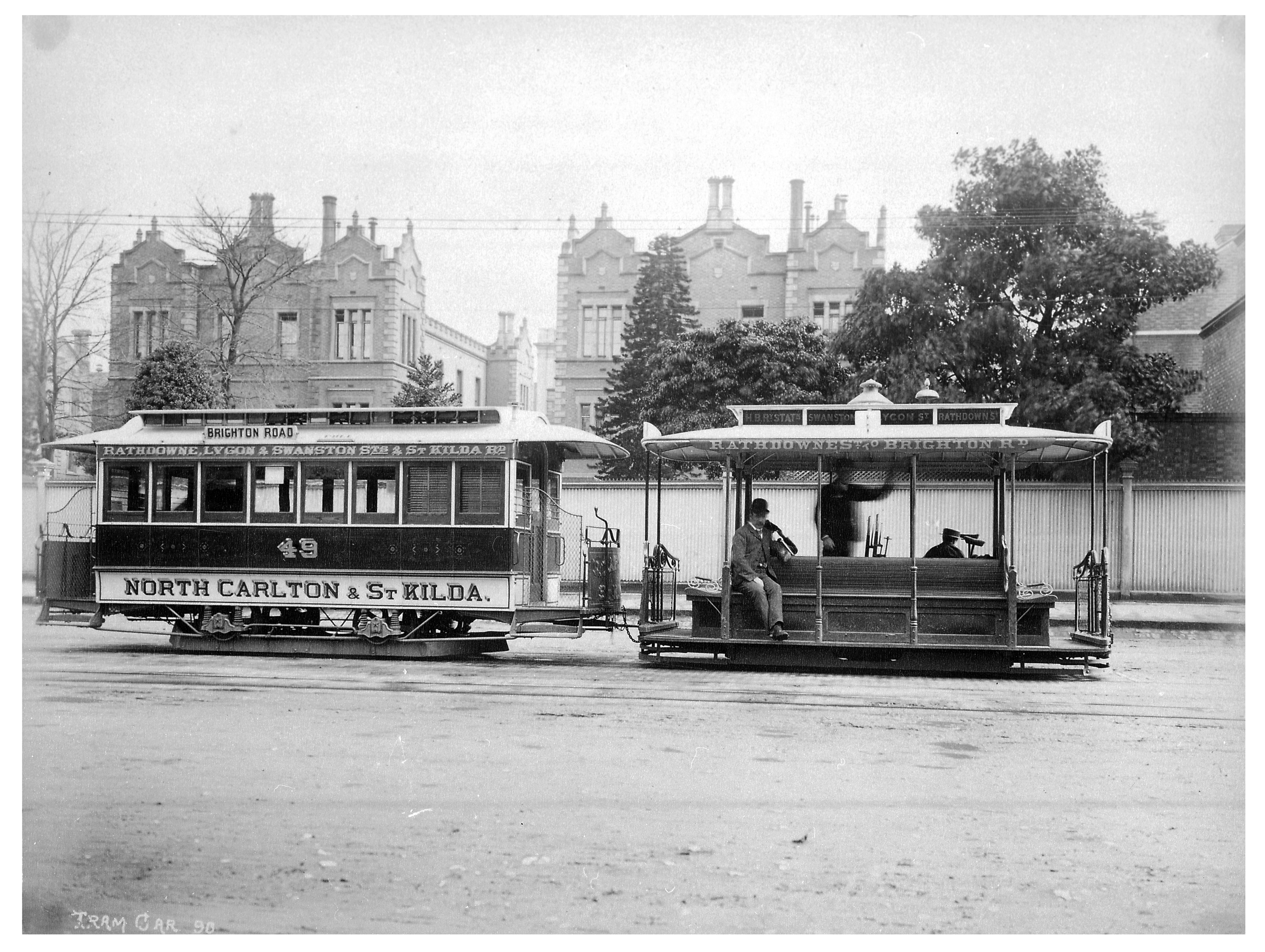
Cable tram (dummy and trailer) on Lonsdale Street, circa 1905

Melbourne's cable tram system has its origins in the MTOC, started by Francis Boardman Clapp in 1877, with a view to operate a Melbourne tram system. After some initial resistance, he successfully lobbied the government who passed the Melbourne Tramway and Omnibus Company's Act 1883 (47 Vict. No. 765) on 10 October 1883, granting the company the right to operate a cable tram system in Melbourne. Although several lines were originally intended to be horse trams, and the MTOC did operate three horse tram lines on the edges of the system, the core of the system was built as cable trams.

The act established the Melbourne Tramways Trust (MTT), which was made up of the 12 municipalities that the MTOC system would serve. The MTT was responsible for the construction of tracks and engine house, while the MTOC built the depots, offices and arranged for the delivery or construction of the rolling stock. The MTT granted a lease to operate the system until 1 July 1916 to the MTOC, with the MTOC paying 4.5% interest on the debts incurred by the MTT in building the system.

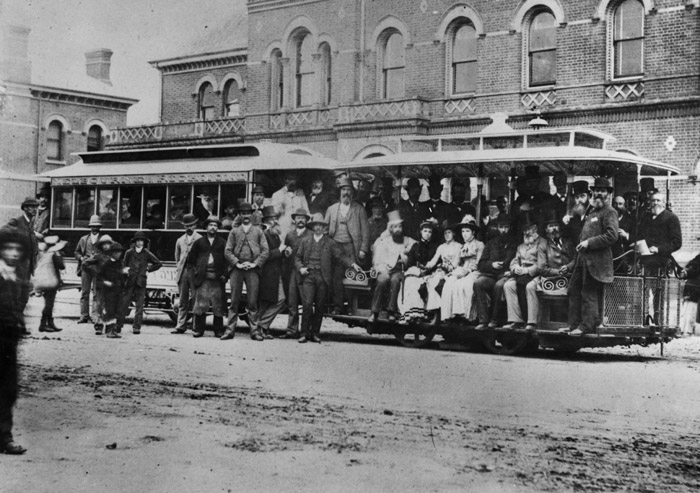
Melbourne's first cable tram service on 11 November 1885

The first cable tram line opened on 11 November 1885, running from Bourke Street to Hawthorn Bridge, along Spencer Street, Flinders Street, Wellington Parade and Bridge Road, with the last line opening on 27 October 1891. At its height the cable system was one of the largest in the world, with 75 kilometres (47 mi) of double track, 1200 gripcars and trailers and 17 routes covering (103.2 route km or 64.12 route miles).

On 18 February 1890, the Northcote tramway was opened by the Clifton Hill to Northcote & Preston Tramway Company. This was Melbourne's only non-MTOC cable tram, built by local land speculators and was operated as an independent line, feeding the Clifton Hill line.

When the lease expired on 1 July 1916, all the assets of the MTT and MTOC cable network were taken over by the Melbourne Tramways Board (MTB). The MMTB was formed on 1 November 1919, taking over the MTB cable tram network, with the Northcote tramway and the tramway trusts transferred to the MMTB on 20 February 1920.

From 1924 the cable tram lines were progressively converted to electric trams, or abandoned in favour of buses, with the last Melbourne cable tram operating on 26 October 1940.

=== First electric trams ===
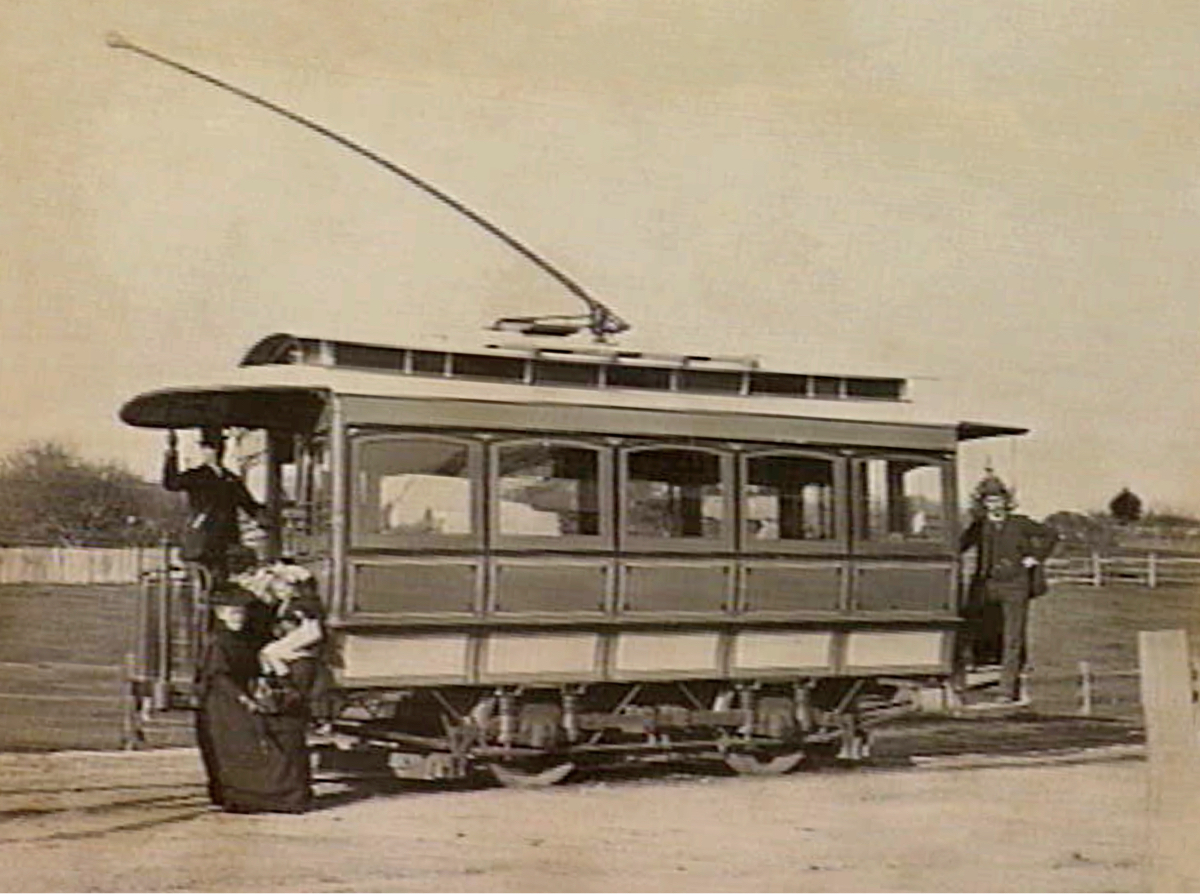
Box Hill to Doncaster tram

The first electric tram in Melbourne was built in 1889 by the Box Hill and Doncaster Tramway Company Limited—an enterprise formed by a group of land developers—and ran from Box Hill railway station along what is now Station Street and Tram Road to Doncaster, using equipment left over from the Centennial International Exhibition of 1888 at the Royal Exhibition Building. The venture was marred with disputes and operational problems, and ultimately failed, with the service ceasing in 1896.

After this venture failed, electric trams returned on 5 May 1906, with the opening of the Victorian Railways Electric Street Railway from St Kilda to Brighton, and was followed on 11 October 1906 with the opening of the North Melbourne Electric Tramways and Lighting Company (NMETL) system, which opened two lines from the cable tram terminus at Flemington Bridge to Essendon and Saltwater River (now Maribyrnong River).

==== Victorian Railways Electric Street Railways ====
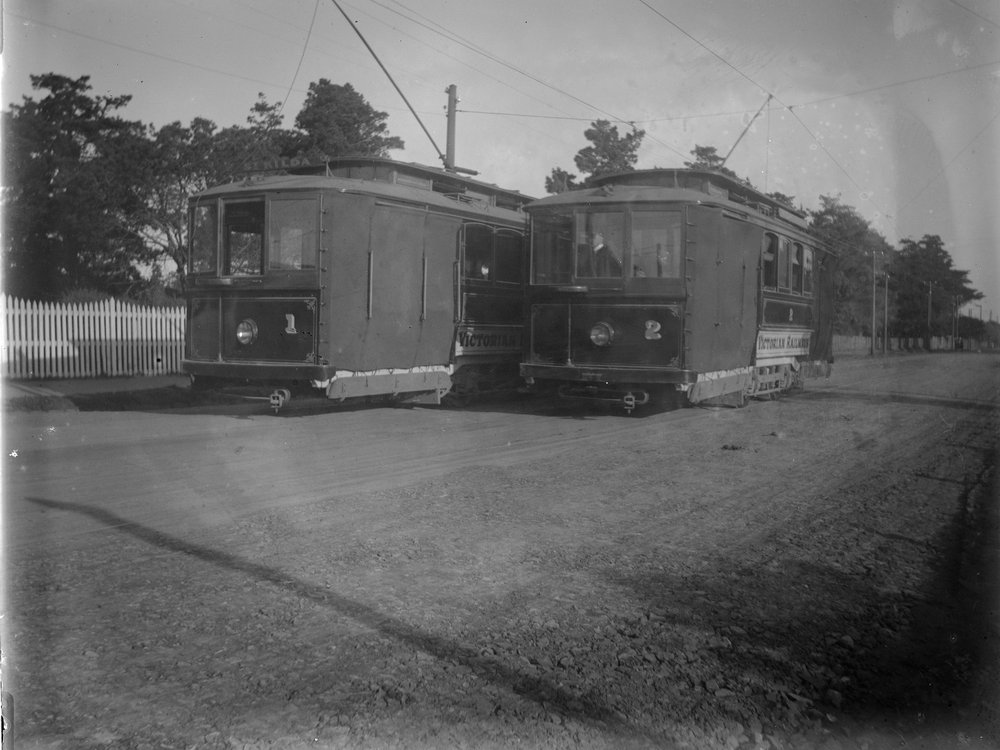
Two Victorian Railways trams

The Victorian Railways line came about when Thomas Bent became Premier. A leading land boomer, he stood to benefit from construction of the line, through the increased value of his large land holdings in the area, and pushed through the legislation to enable to building of the line by the VR in 1904.

The VR tram was called a "Street Railway" and was built using the Victorian Railways 5 ft 3 in (1,600 mm) broad gauge instead of the cable tramway standard gauge of 4 ft 8 1/2 in (1,435 mm), and connected it with the St Kilda railway station, which would allow trams to be moved along the St Kilda railway line for servicing at Jolimont Yard. The line was opened in two stages, from St Kilda railway station to Middle Brighton on 5 May 1906 and to Brighton Beach terminus on 22 December 1906.

A fire at the Elwood tram depot on 7 March 1907 destroyed the depot and all the trams. Services resumed on 17 March 1907 using four C-class trams and three D-class trams from Sydney, which were altered to run on VR trucks salvaged from the fire. These trams sufficed until Newport Workshops built 14 new trams. The St Kilda to Brighton Beach Electric Street Railway closed on 28 February 1959 and was replaced by buses.

VR opened a second, standard gauge, electric tramway from Sandringham railway station to Black Rock on 10 March 1919, it was extended to Beaumaris on 2 September 1926. The service was withdrawn on 5 November 1956 and replaced with buses.

==== North Melbourne Electric Tramway and Lighting Company ====
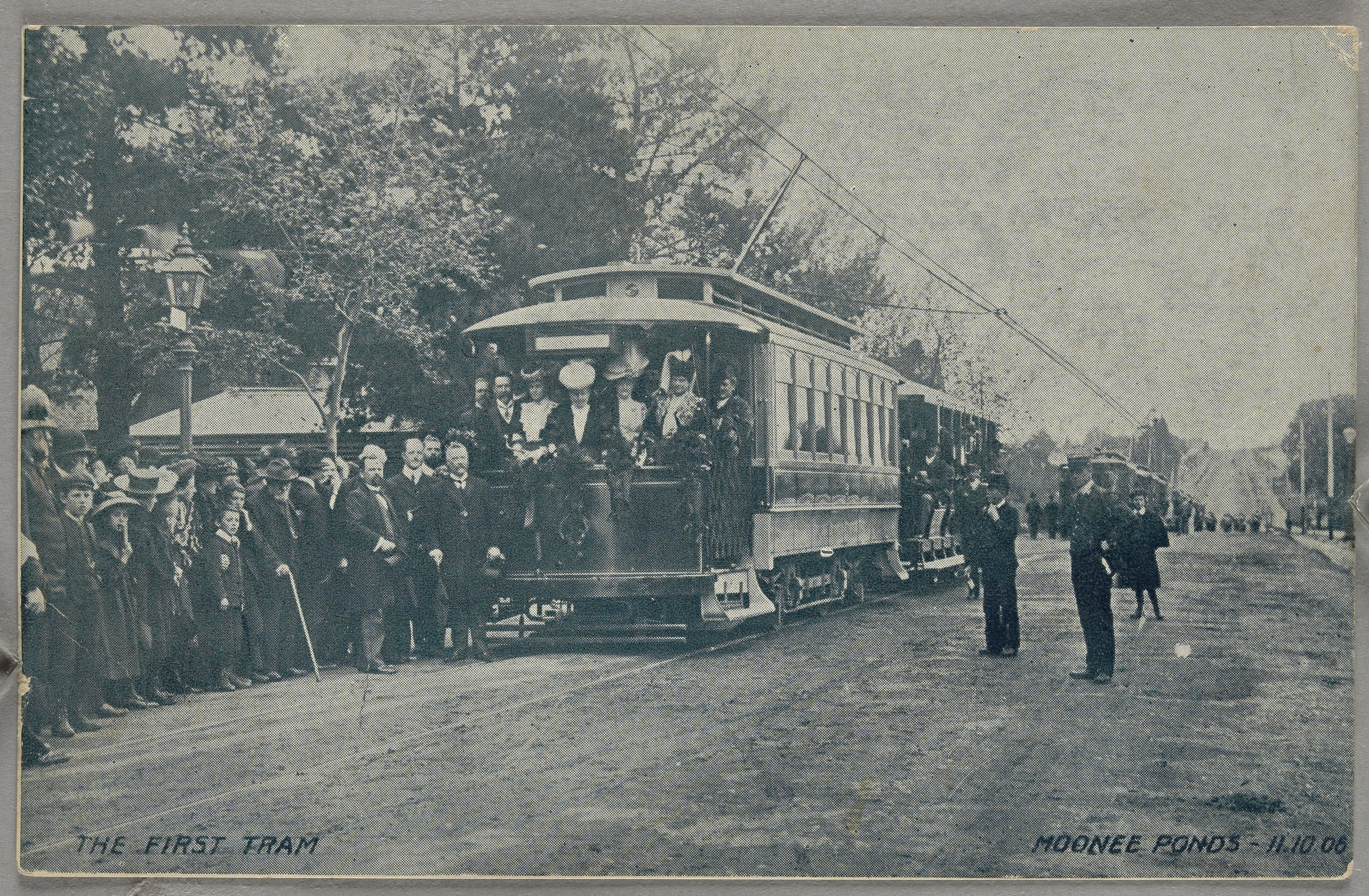
First North Melbourne Electric Tramway & Lighting Co tram on opening day

The North Melbourne Electric Tramway and Lighting Company (NMETL) was an electricity and tramway company that operated from 1906 to 1922. The tramway section was taken over by the MMTB on 1 August 1922 and the electricity section taken over by the State Electricity Commission of Victoria in 1922.

The Victorian Government of Sir Thomas Bent approved an application by Mr Morgan to build a tramway system in the Essendon area on 29 March 1904, with a poll of ratepayers overwhelming supporting the proposition on 29 July 1904 (2874 votes to 146). Mr Morgan transferred the concession to the NMETL, which had been formed to build the system and provide electricity to the area. Under the concession the NMETL was to construct a tramway and provide electricity within the municipalities of Essendon and Flemington for 30 years, it also mandated a service at least every 20 minutes and had provisions for the undertaking to become property of the municipalities involved earlier than the prescribed 30 years.

The NMETL bought land on Mount Alexander Road for its offices, car barn and power house, with the foundation stone laid by the Mayors of Essendon and Flemington on 24 May 1905, and the first rail laid a month later by Premier Bent. The system opened on 11 October 1906 operating two routes from Flemington Bridge—one to Essendon via Mount Alexander Road, Pascoe Vale Road, Fletcher Street and onto Mount Alexander Road again (with a short branch line along Puckle Street), and the second to Saltwater River via Mount Alexander Road, Victoria Street, Racecourse Road, Epsom Road, Union Road and Maribyrnong Road. The system was approximately 7 mi (11.3 km) and was operated by 25 motor cars and 10 trailers.

=== The tramway trusts ===
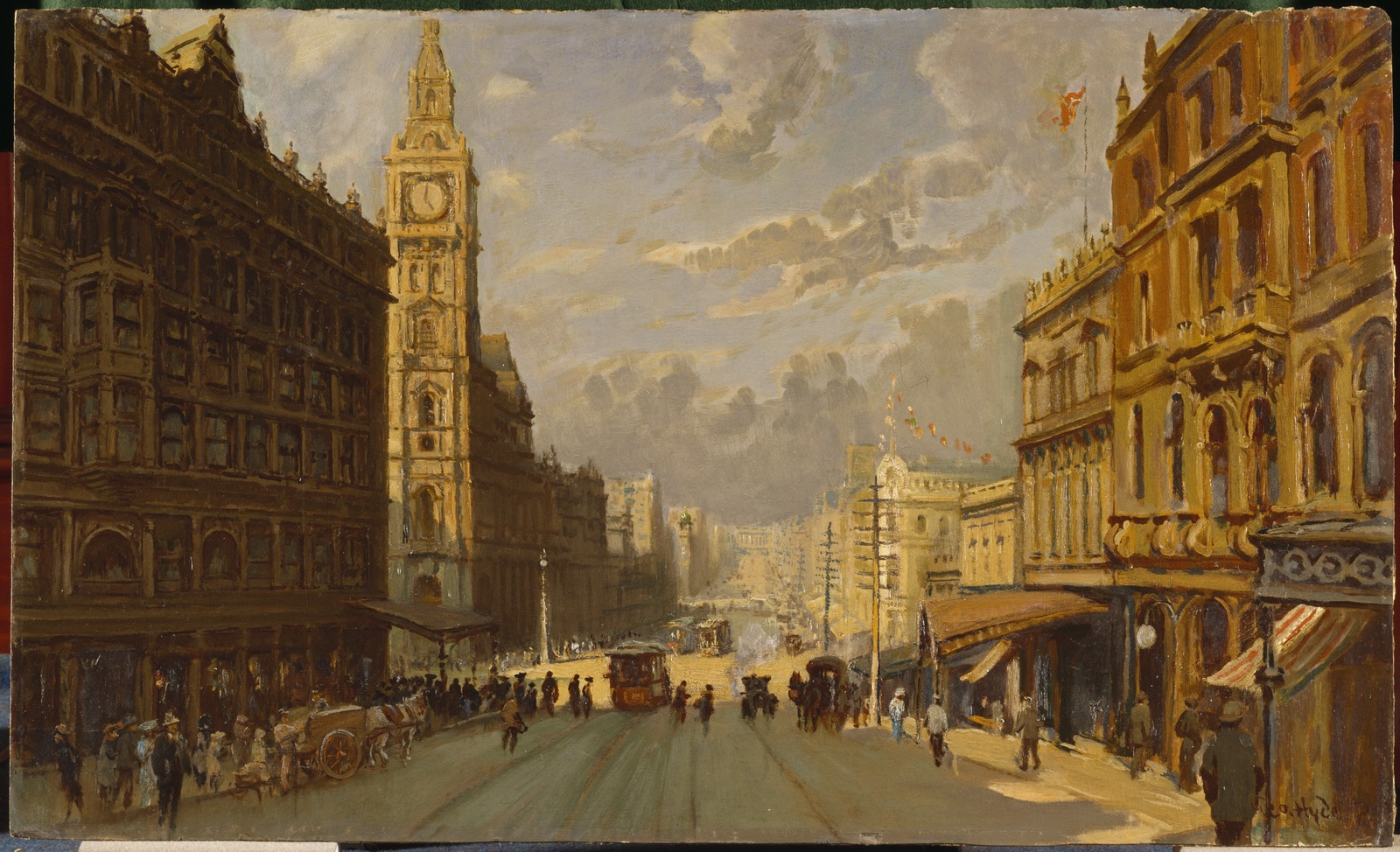
Painting by George Hyde Pownall showing trams running down Bourke St in central Melbourne in 1912

Due to demand for better public transport in Melbourne's inner suburbs of Prahran and Malvern the Prahran and Malvern Tramways Trust Act 1907 was enacted. Councillor Alex Cameron of Malvern, who led the push for a municipal tramway service, was elected chairman of the trust by both Malvern and Prahran councils. Construction began on its first tram line in 1909 with the first passenger service commencing on 30 May 1910. Using overhead wires to feed electricity to the trams, the network continued to expand greatly and profitably. In 1913, the region covered by the PMTT was extended and, thus, representatives of the Hawthorn and Kew councils were also included on the board. In 1916 Camberwell council representatives were also included.

Following the PMTT, the following municipal trusts were formed:

- Hawthorn Tramways Trust – 1914 (Municipalities of Melbourne, Richmond, Camberwell & Hawthorn)
- Melbourne, Brunswick & Coburg Tramways Trust – 1916 (Municipalities of Brunswick, Coburg & Melbourne)
- Fitzroy, Northcote & Preston Tramways Trust – in process of construction when taken over in 1920 (Municipalities of Fitzroy, Northcote & Preston)
- Footscray Tramway Trust – in process of construction when taken over in 1920 (Municipality of Footscray)

=== Melbourne & Metropolitan Tramways Board ===
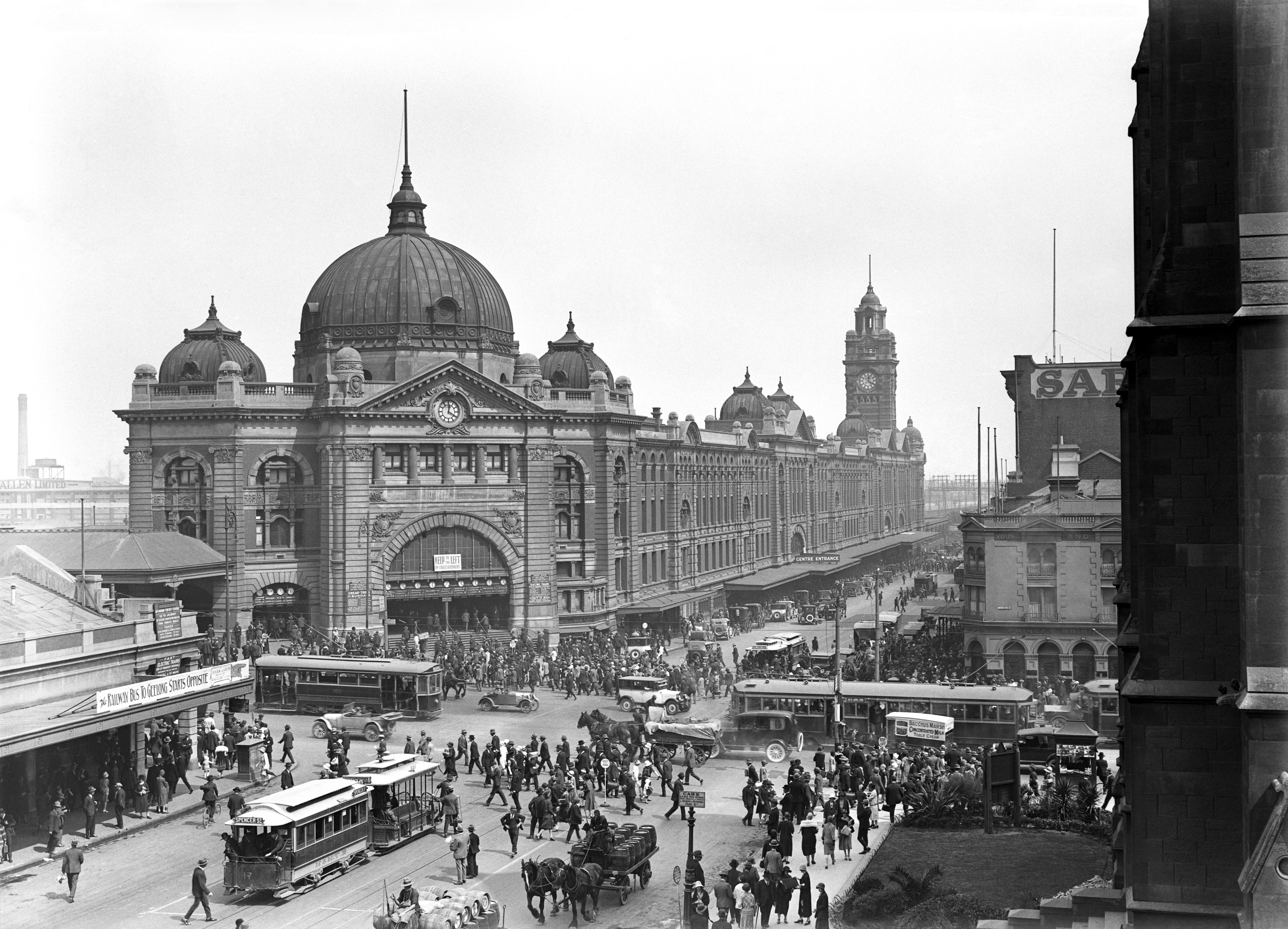
Intersection of Swanston and Flinders Streets showing electric and cable trams, 1927

The Melbourne & Metropolitan Tramways Board (MMTB) was formed in July 1919 to take control of Melbourne's cable tram network, six of the seven electric tramway companies, and the last horse tram. By 1940, all cable and horse tram lines had been abandoned or converted to either electric tram or bus operation.

Alex Cameron was its full-time chairman. The tramway network had both cable and electric traction and had been constructed by different bodies without any uniform system. Under Cameron, the MMTB brought these systems under its control, extending the electric lines, and converting the existing cable-system to electric traction. To solve operational and maintenance problem the MMTB introduced in 1923 the iconic W class tram and phased out the other models. The Preston Workshops were constructed about this time to manufacture and maintain the new tram fleet.

In March 1923 Alex Cameron went overseas to investigate traffic problems. He returned next year, confirmed in his long-held opinions that electric trams were superior to buses and that overhead wires were preferable to the underground conduit (cable) system. Alex Cameron remained chairman there until 1935. He died a few years later in 1940, the same year the last of the cable tram services in Melbourne ended.

The MMTB generated further patronage by developing the enormous Wattle Park in the 1920s and 1930s, it had inherited Wattle Park from the Hawthorn Tramways Trust with the HTTs takeover by the MMTB.

After World War II other Australian cities began to replace their trams with buses. However, in Melbourne, the Bourke Street buses were replaced by trams in 1955, and new lines opened to East Preston and Brunswick East.

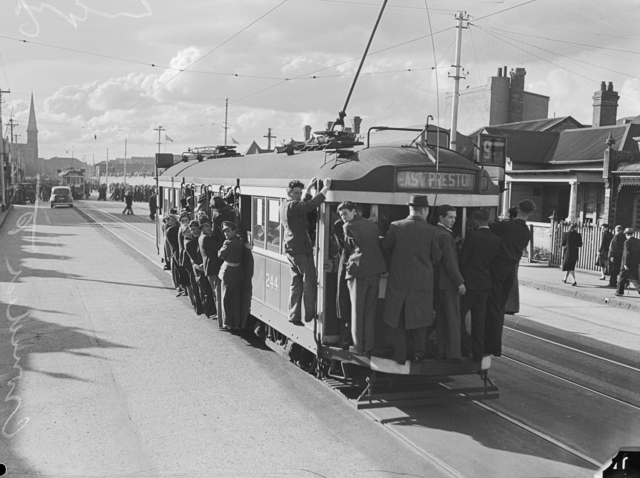
An overcrowded East Preston tram in Fitzroy North, 1944

Melbourne's tram usage peaked at 260 million trips in 1949, before dropping sharply to 200 million the following year in 1950. However usage defied the trend and bounced back in 1951, but began a gradual decline in usage which would continue until 1970. During the same period bus use also went into decline and buses have never proved as popular with passengers as trams at any time in Melbourne's history.

By the 1970s Melbourne was the only Australian city with a major tram network. Melbourne resisted the trend to shut down the network for three major reasons: partly because the city's wide streets and geometric street pattern made trams more practicable than in many other cities; partly because of resistance from the unions; and partly because the Chairman of the MMTB, Sir Robert Risson, successfully argued that the cost of ripping up the concrete-embedded tram tracks would be prohibitive. Also, the infrastructure and vehicles were relatively new, having replaced Cable Tram equipment in the 1920s–1940s. This destroyed the argument used by many other cities, which was that renewal of the tram system would cost more than replacing it with buses.

The colour film "Citizen Tram" was commissioned by Risson in the 1960s.

By the mid-1970s, as other cities became increasingly choked in traffic and air pollution, Melbourne was convinced that its decision to retain its trams was the correct one, even though patronage had been declining since the 1950s in the face of increasing use of cars and the shift to the outer suburbs, beyond the tram network's limits.

The first tram line extension in over twenty years took place in 1978, along Burwood Highway. The W class trams were gradually replaced by the new Z class trams in the 1970s, and by the A class trams and the larger, articulated B class trams in the 1980s.

In 1980, the controversial Lonie Report recommended the closure of seven tram lines. Public protests and union action resulted in the closures not being carried out.

=== Metropolitan Transit Authority and Public Transport Corporation ===
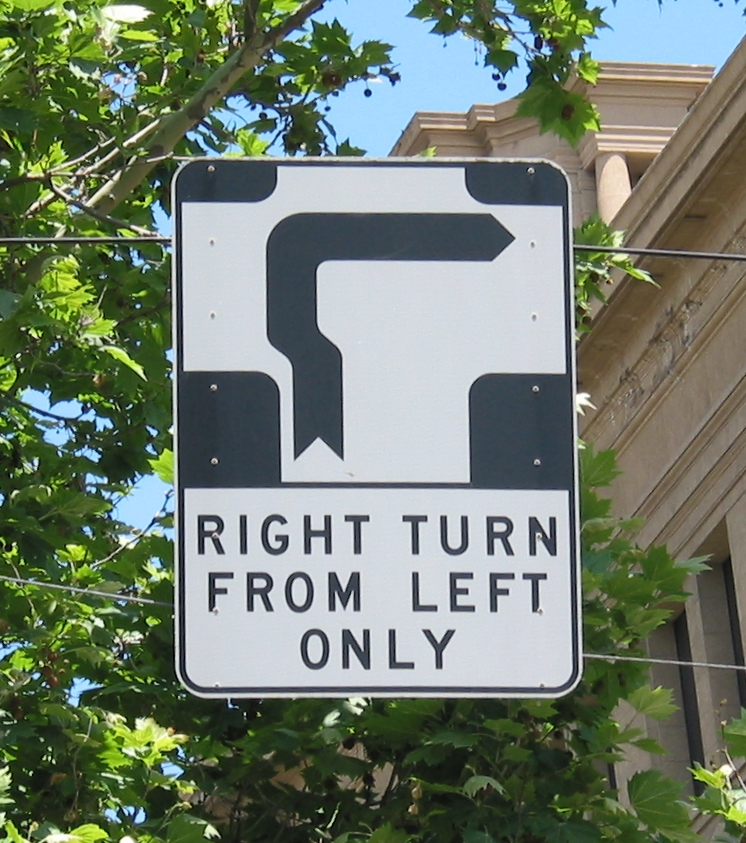
Hook turn sign

The MMTB, along with the metropolitan railway assets of VicRail, were absorbed into the newly formed Metropolitan Transit Authority (MTA) on 1 July 1983, while the regional assets of VicRail were absorbed by the State Transit Authority (STA). The MTA was formed to co-ordinate and operate the Melbourne public transport system, during 1986–87 an integration of rail, tram and bus divisions took place, with the operations, maintenance and administration of these departments fully integrated by 11 April 1988.

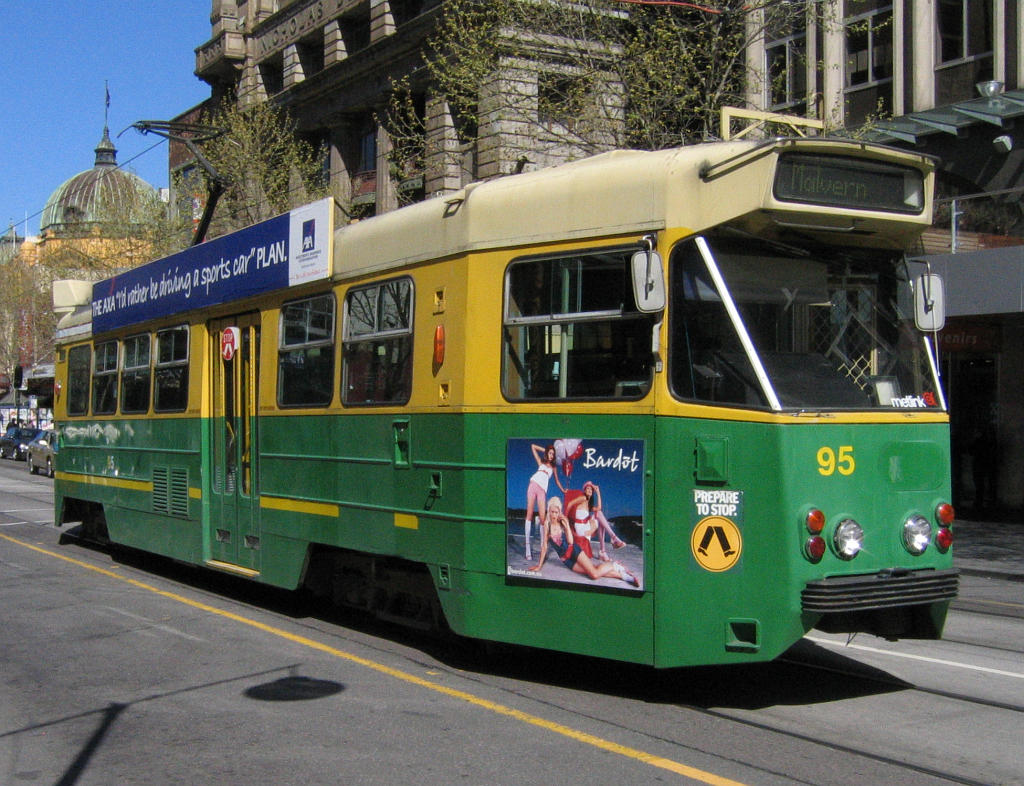
Z1.95 in The Met livery on Swanston Street

The MTA introduced a new green and yellow livery and uniform design, with a new logo, showing the integration of Melbourne's public transport system, replacing the MMTB logo, and introduced a new time-based integrated ticketing system, for all modes of Melbourne's public transport.

An Automatic Vehicle Monitoring system was introduced in 1985, improving communication with drivers and allowing tracking of trams throughout the network. This reduced tram bunching and improved reliability of tram services.

The St Kilda and Port Melbourne railway lines were converted to light rail lines in 1987, with the lines closed on 1 July 1987 and 11 October 1987 respectively. Trams first ran on the St Kilda line on 20 November 1987, with Port Melbourne following on 13 December 1987. The conversion consisted of the track being re-gauged from broad gauge 5 ft 3 in (1,600 mm) to standard gauge 4 ft 8 1/2 in (1,435 mm), the overhead wires being converted to tramway voltage and light rail platforms built adjacent to the former stations platforms.

As a result of the Transport (Amendment) Act 1989 the MTA and STA were merged into the Public Transport Corporation (PTC) on 1 July 1989, bringing all rail services in Victoria under one body.

By the late 1980s, the state government was under financial pressures brought on by an economic downturn. In January 1990, the Labor government of Premier John Cain tried to introduce economies into the running of the public transport system, including the removal of tram conductors. This provoked a long and crippling strike by the tramways union in January 1990, resulting in a back-down by the government and the retention of conductors.

In the 1992 state election, the Liberals came to power under Premier Jeff Kennett, who planned to cut the costs of Melbourne's public transport network and remove conductors. OneLink were contracted in 1995 to introduce an automatic ticketing system. The tramway union, which opposed this move, went on strike during the 1997 Grand Prix. One month later the government announced plans for privatisation of the PTC. The tram conductors were replaced with ticketing machines between 1996 and 1998—shortly before the system was privatised.

=== Privatisation ===
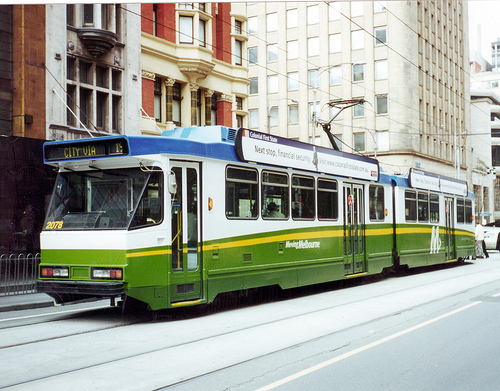
B2.2078 class tram in M>Tram livery in 2001

On 1 July 1997, in preparation for privatisation of the Public Transport Corporation, Melbourne's tram network was split into two businesses: Met Tram 1 (later renamed Swanston Trams) and Met Tram 2 (later renamed Yarra Trams). VicTrack, a new statutory authority within the Victorian Government, was created in 1997 to hold the ownership of land and assets relating to Victoria's tram and rail systems. In addition, a statutory office was established—the Director of Public Transport—to procure rail and tram services and to enter into and manage contracts with transport operators.

After a tendering process the businesses were awarded as 12-year franchises, with Swanston Trams won by National Express, and the Yarra Trams business by TransdevTSL. Following a transitional period, the right to operate the two tram businesses was officially transferred from the government to the private sector under franchise agreements on 29 August 1999.

National Express renamed Swanston Trams as M>Tram, similarly along with its M>Train suburban train business, on 1 October 2001. After several years of failing to make a profit, more than a year of negotiations over revised financing arrangements with the government, and grave concern over its future viability, National Express Group announced on 16 December 2002, its decision to walk away from all of their Victorian contracts and hand control back to the state government, with funding for its operations to stop on 23 December 2002. The government ran M>Tram until negotiations were completed with Yarra Trams for it to take-over responsibility of the whole tram network from 18 April 2004.

On 25 June 2009, it was announced that Keolis Downer, a joint venture between Keolis and Downer EDI, would be the operator of the Melbourne tram network from 30 November 2009. The contract was for eight years, with an option for a further seven years.

=== System upgrades ===
As a part of the privatisation process, franchise contracts between the state government and both private operators included obligations to extend and modernise the Melbourne tram network. This included acquiring new tram rolling stock, in addition the existing tram fleet was refurbished. Swanston Trams (M>Tram) introduced 59 new Siemens Combino (D class) low-floor built trams by Siemens, at a cost of A$175 million, and invested approximately A$8 million in refurbishing their fleet, while Yarra Trams introduced 36 Alstom Citadis (C1 class) low-floor trams, at a cost of A$100 million, and invested A$5.3 million refurbishing their fleet.

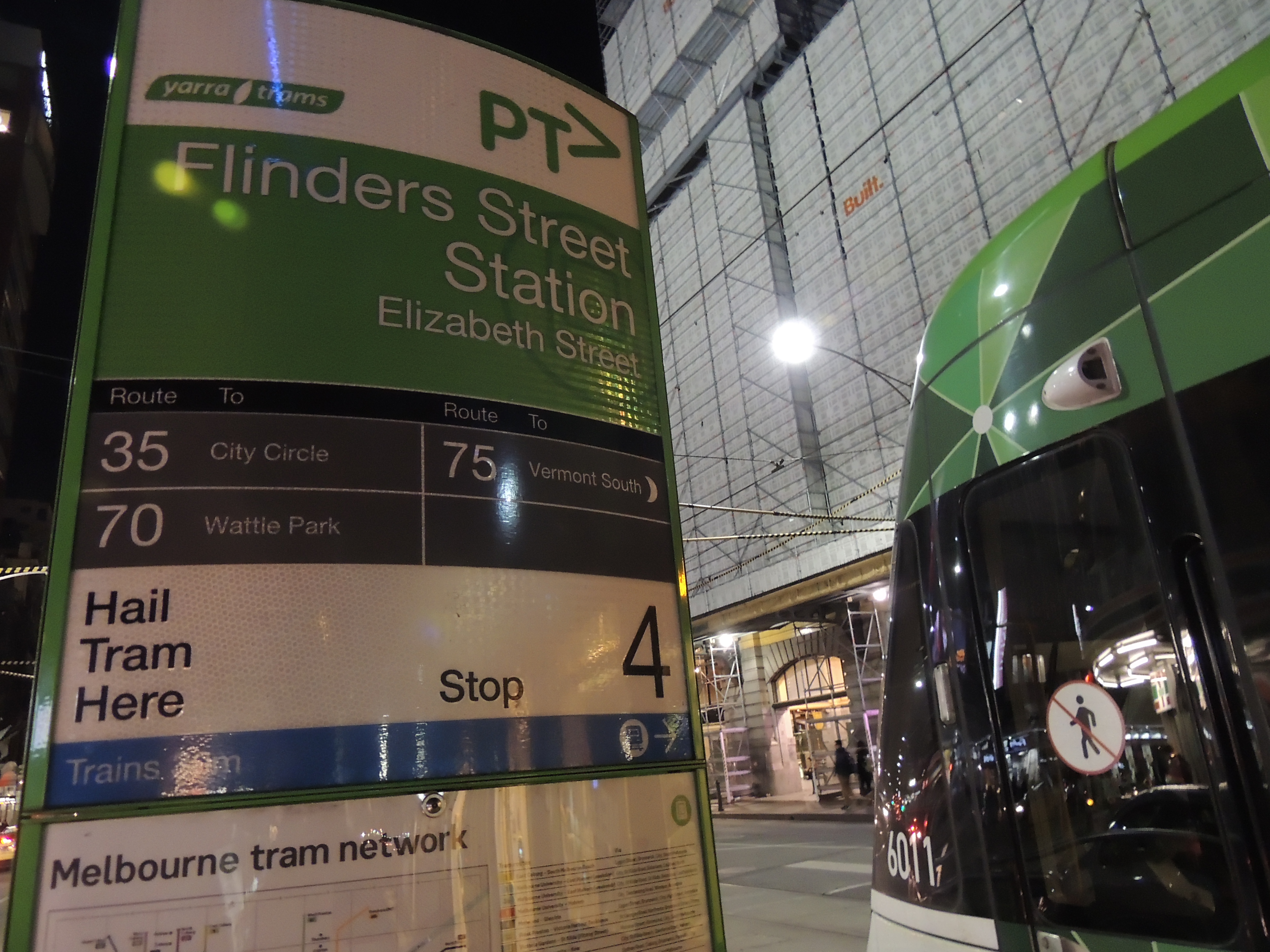
Tram stop sign outside Flinders Street station

In 2003 the marketing and umbrella brand Metlink was introduced to co-ordinate the promotion of Melbourne's public transport and the communications from the separate privatised companies. Metlink's role was to provide timetables, passenger information about connecting services provided by several operators, fares and ticketing information and introduce uniform signage across the Melbourne public transport system.

Since privatisation extensions have been made to the tram system, with the $28 million extension of the 109 to Box Hill opening on 2 May 2003, a $7.5 million extension along Docklands Drive in Docklands opened on 4 January 2005, and a $42.6 million extension of the 75 to Vermont South opening on 23 July 2005.

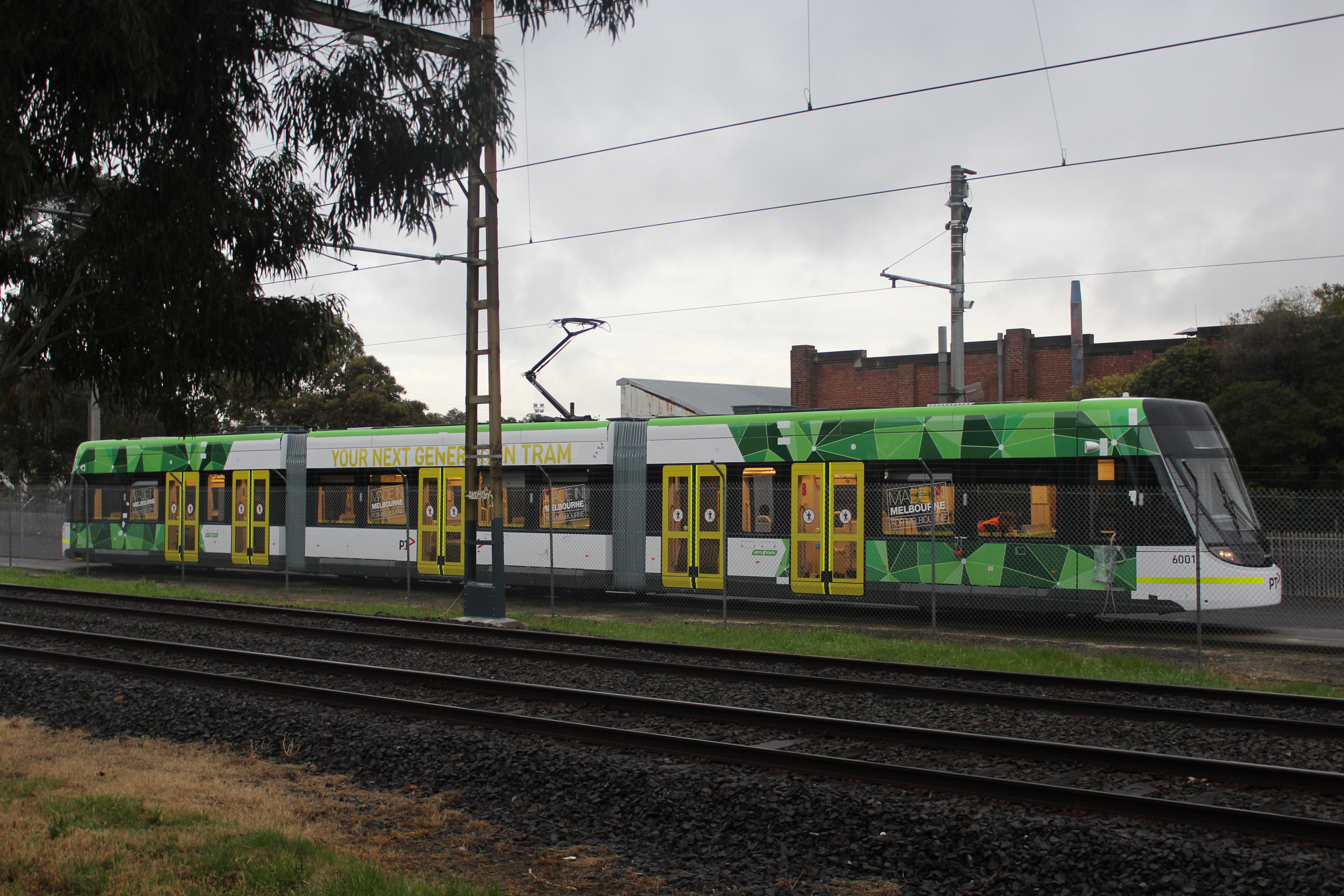
E 6001 in Public Transport Victoria livery at Preston Workshops on the test track before entering passenger service, September 2013

It was announced on 27 September 2010 that Bombardier Transportation had won a $303 million contract to supply and maintain 50 new E class trams, the contract includes an option for a further 100. They will be built at Bombardier's Dandenong factory, with the propulsion systems and bogies coming from Bombardier's factories in Mannheim and Siegen, Germany, respectively. The trams will be 33 metres long and have a capacity of 210 passengers and are due to be in service in 2013. The first E class tram arrived at Preston Workshops in late June 2013 for testing, with the first two E class entering revenue service in November 2013.

In April 2012, Public Transport Victoria (PTV), a new statutory authority was formed after amendments to the Transport Integration Act 2010 and the passing of the Transport Legislation Amendment (Public Transport Development Authority) Act 2011. PTV assumed responsibility from the Director of Public Transport for the provision and administration of Victoria's transport services. It also provides information on fares, transport services and initiatives, and is responsible for overseeing and improving Victoria's public transport services.

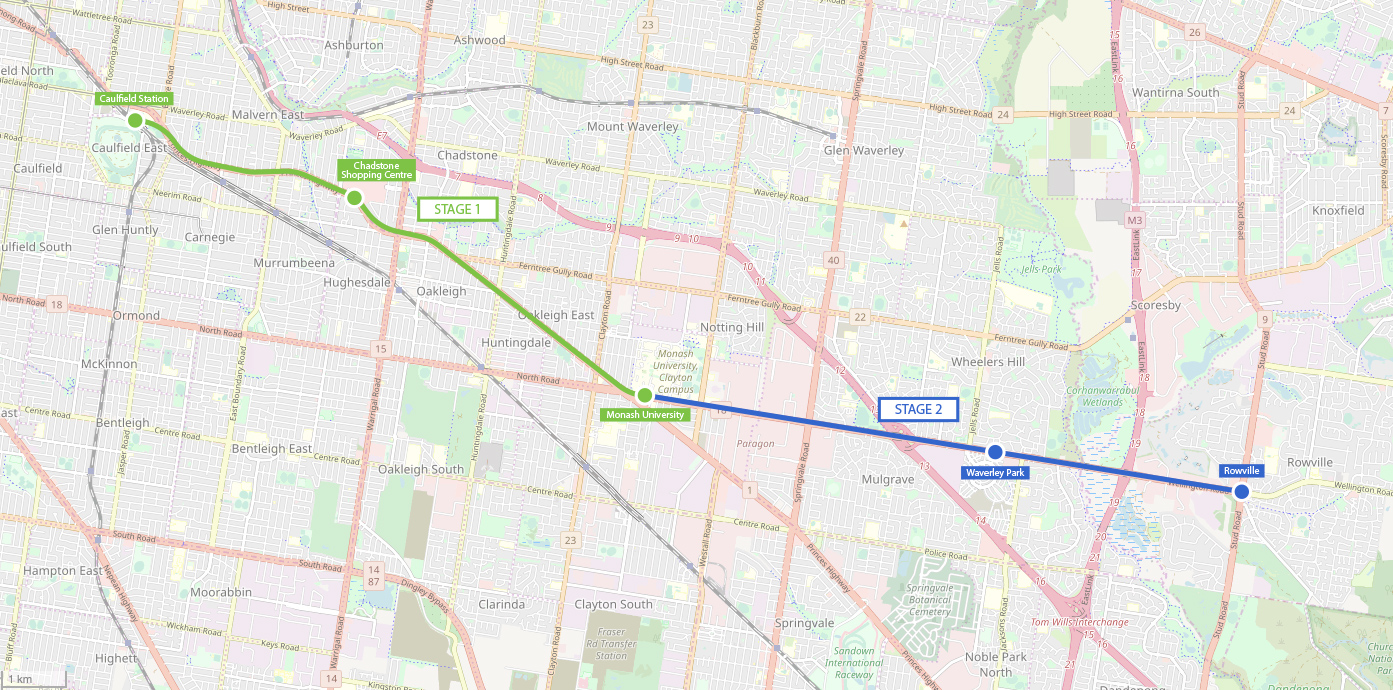
Map showing the 2018 State Government proposal for a new tram line from Caulfield railway station to Chadstone, Monash University, Waverley Park and Rowville

The era since privatisation has also brought large patronage increases, an increase in platform stops, and a new ticketing system. In 1999–2000 year—when the tram system was privatised—patronage was 127.3 million per annum, this has increased almost each year since, and in the 2012–2013 year was 182.7 million passenger trips, a 4.2% year-on-year patronage increase; trams are the second most utilised public transport method, between trains and buses. Yarra Trams, the Department of Transport, and later Public Transport Victoria, committed to introduce level boarding stops to improve accessibility and safety, and comply with the Disability Discrimination Act 1992; as of January 2014 360 accessible stops have been constructed, all since 1999.

The Metcard ticketing system which operated from 1996 was switched off on 29 December 2012, leaving Myki—which has been in operation on Melbourne trains since 29 December 2009, and valid on Melbourne trams and buses since 25 July 2010—as the sole ticketing system.

=== Recent ===
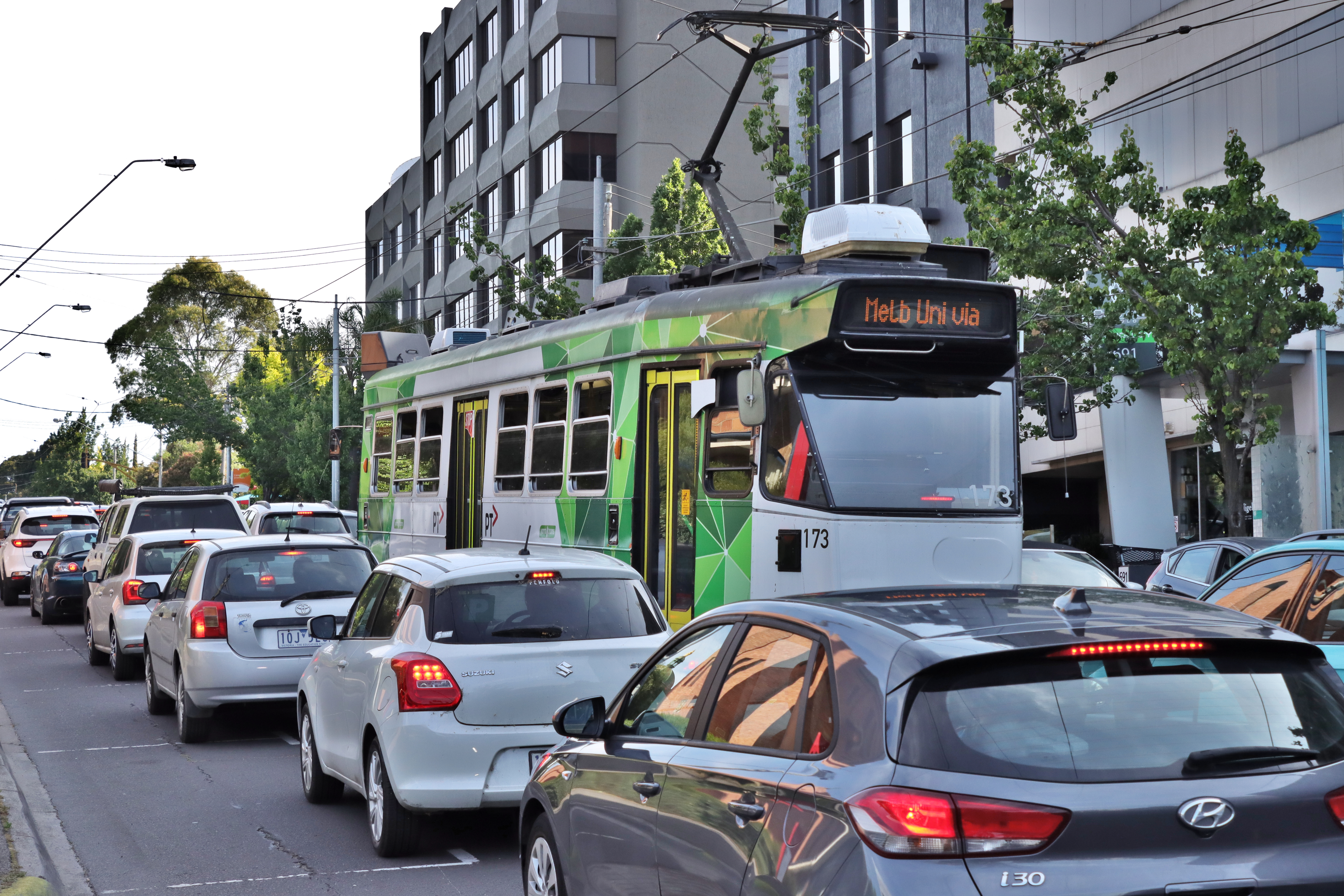
Trams in Melbourne are frequently delayed by vehicle traffic, making the network one of the slowest in the world.

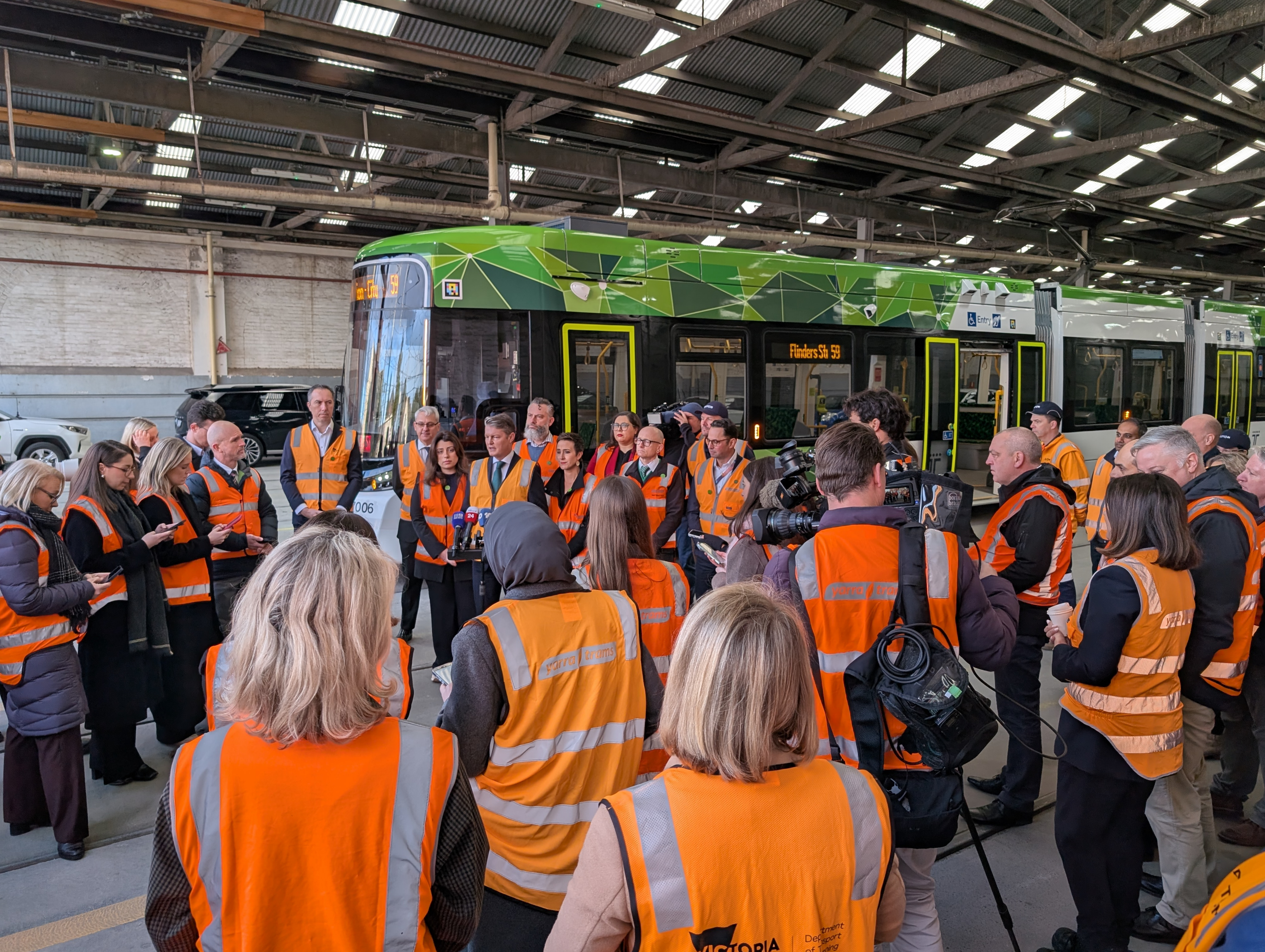
Premier of Victoria, Ben Carroll, at a press conference in Essendon Tram Depot in front of the first G class tram on its first day of passenger service.

At the start of 2015, the Free Tram Zone was introduced, which provided for free tram travel within the CBD, Docklands and the Queen Victoria Market, and ticketing was simplified to have just two payment zones. Primarily aimed at helping tourists move around the city centre, the Free Tram Zone was criticised by some as contributing to tram overcrowding. Between 2015 and 2019, 50 more E class trams were ordered by the Andrews state government, bringing the total order to 100 to be delivered by 2021.

In April 2018, the state government announced a new extension of the tram network from Caulfield. The 18 km (11.2 mi) extension would serve Chadstone, Monash University, Waverley Park and Rowville. The state government allocated $3 million to plan the route, which would be constructed in two stages, with the first running from Caulfield to Monash. In 2019 the government also allocated $4.5 million to plan for two new tram lines to the Fisherman's Bend urban renewal precinct, although it stopped short of committing to the project.

In 2020, six tram stops were rebuilt to be low-floor and accessible on Nicholson Street in Carlton as part of the Route 96 Project started in 2012 to make the entire line level-access and more separated from car traffic. Despite gradual stop upgrades, by 2021 73% of Melbourne's tram stops were still inaccessible for people in wheelchairs with initiatives like the Route 96 Project being criticised as too slow. As part of the project, Acland Street in St Kilda was closed to cars and a plaza built.

In the 2020–21 budget, the state government announced $1.48 billion for 100 next generation trams, G class trams, to replace older low-floor trams, to be delivered from 2025 following the completed order of 100 E class trams. In August 2021, the government announced that a new maintenance and storage depot would be built at Maidstone to accommodate these new trams. As of March 2024, the Maidstone tram depot is currently under construction and is scheduled to be completed in 2025.

== Routes ==
24 numbered routes operate with a regular schedule on Melbourne's tram network. Route numbers suffixed with the letter 'a' terminate before the usual destination, divert from the usual route, or both (due to major delays, disruptions or special events), while services suffixed with the letter 'd' terminate or divert to their depots (at end of service).

Route	Terminus A	via	Terminus B	Full length
1	East Coburg	Brunswick East – Carlton – City – South Melbourne	South Melbourne Beach, Albert Park	13.2 km (8.2 mi)
3	Melbourne University, Carlton	City – Balaclava – Caulfield North	Malvern East	14.9 km (9.3 mi)
5	Melbourne University, Carlton	City – Windsor – Armadale	Malvern	12.6 km (7.8 mi)
6	Moreland railway station, Brunswick	Brunswick East – Carlton – City – Prahran – Armadale – Malvern	Glen Iris	19.0 km (11.8 mi)
11	West Preston	Thornbury – Northcote – Fitzroy – City	Victoria Harbour, Docklands	13.3 km (8.3 mi)
12	Victoria Gardens Shopping Centre, Richmond	Richmond – East Melbourne – City – South Melbourne – Middle Park	Fitzroy & Park Streets, St Kilda	11.3 km (7.0 mi)
16	Melbourne University, Carlton	City – St Kilda – Balaclava – Caulfield North – Malvern – Hawthorn	Kew	20.2 km (12.6 mi)
19 (Note: Operates overnight on Saturday and Sunday mornings.)	Coburg North	Brunswick – Parkville	Flinders Street railway station, City	10.2 km (6.3 mi)
30	St Vincent's Plaza, East Melbourne	City	Central Pier, Docklands	2.9 km (1.8 mi)
35 (Note: City Circle services operates in a clockwise direction between 9:30 am and 5:00 pm, excluding Good Friday and Christmas Day.)	The District Docklands Shopping Centre (Note: Signed as Waterfront City Docklands.)	City	The District Docklands Shopping Centre	7.6 km (4.7 mi)
48	North Balwyn	Kew – Richmond – East Melbourne – City	Victoria Harbour, Docklands	13.5 km (8.4 mi)
57	West Maribyrnong	Ascot Vale – Flemington – North Melbourne	Flinders Street railway station, City	11.6 km (7.2 mi)
58	Pascoe Vale South (Note: Signed as West Coburg.)	Brunswick West – Parkville – City – Southbank – South Yarra	Toorak	18.2 km (11.3 mi)
59	Airport West	Essendon – Moonee Ponds – Travancore – Parkville	Flinders Street railway station, City	14.7 km (9.1 mi)
64	Melbourne University, Carlton	City – Windsor – Armadale – Caulfield	Brighton East	16.1 km (10.0 mi)
64a	Orrong & Dandenong Roads, Armadale (after 6:30 pm) (Note: Connects with route 5 services to and from Melbourne University.)	Caulfield	Brighton East	6.9 km (4.3 mi)
67	Melbourne University, Carlton	City – Balaclava – Elwood – Elsternwick – Caulfield – Glen Huntly	Carnegie	15.5 km (9.6 mi)
70	Wattle Park, Surrey Hills	Camberwell – Hawthorn – Richmond – City	The District Docklands Shopping Centre	16.5 km (10.3 mi)
72	Melbourne University, Carlton	City – Prahran – Toorak – Glen Iris – Camberwell	Deepdene (Note: Signed as Camberwell.)	16.8 km (10.4 mi)
75	Vermont South Shopping Centre	Burwood – Camberwell – Hawthorn – Richmond – City	Central Pier, Docklands	22.8 km (14.2 mi)
78	North Richmond	South Yarra – Prahran – Windsor	Balaclava	6.5 km (4.0 mi)
82	Footscray railway station	Maribyrnong – Ascot Vale	Moonee Ponds Junction	9.2 km (5.7 mi)
86	RMIT University Bundoora	Preston – Thornbury – Northcote – Collingwood – Fitzroy – City	The District Docklands Shopping Centre	22.2 km (13.8 mi)
96	Brunswick East	Carlton – City – South Melbourne – Albert Park – St Kilda	St Kilda Beach	13.9 km (8.6 mi)
109	Box Hill Central	Balwyn – Kew – Richmond – East Melbourne – City	Port Melbourne	19.2 km (11.9 mi)

== Fleet ==
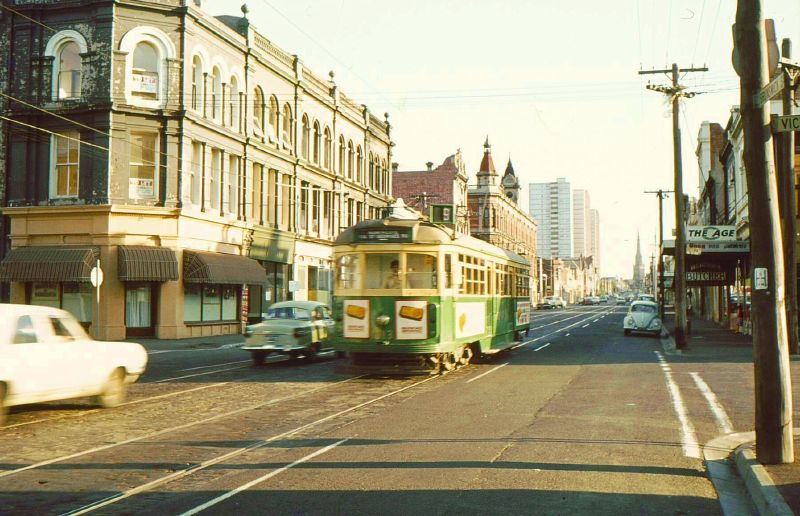
A tram travels down Brunswick Street, 1979.

The Melbourne tram fleet currently comprises 495 trams as of October 2026. Classification is based on the original system begun by the MMTB in 1921.

The rolling stock is part of leases to Yarra Trams, with the W-, Z, A and B class trams owned by the Victorian Government, and the C1 class and D classes are subject to lease purchase agreements, while the C2 class trams were leased from Mulhouse, France but are now state assets.

=== W class ===
W class trams were introduced to Melbourne in 1923 as a new standard design. They have two equal-wheeled bogies, with all four axles powered by a separate motor; carbodies feature a distinctive "drop centre" section, allowing the passenger steps at the central doorways to be closer to the ground. A total of 756 W class trams of 11 variants were built up until 1956, and they formed the mainstay of Melbourne's tramways system for 60 years.

It was not until the 1980s that the W class started to be replaced in large numbers, and by 1990 their status as an icon for the city was recognised, leading to a listing by the National Trust of Australia. Public outrage over their sale for tourist use overseas led to an embargo on further export out of the country in 1993, though recently some have been given or loaned to various Museums. Approximately 200 of the W class trams retired since then remain stored, and the future use of these trams is unknown.

W class trams have been sent overseas: five went to Seattle between 1978 and 1993, where they operated on Seattle's George Benson Waterfront Streetcar Line from 1982, but suspended in 2005. Another nine are now part of the downtown Memphis tourist service, while several other US cities have one or two. The Edmonton Radial Railway Society in Edmonton, Alberta received No. 930 in 1997, and currently operates it on the High Level Bridge Streetcar heritage line.

As of January 2015, there are approximately 230 W class trams: about 165 are in storage, 27 are stored operational in "ready reserve", 12 run on the City Circle (the oldest W class tram in service runs on the City Circle) and 26 are used in revenue service. In January 2010, it was announced by the new transport minister that the 26 W class trams running the two inner city routes, would be phased out by 2012, prompting a new campaign from the National Trust of Australia. In 2010, it was proposed to better utilise the unused W class trams by refurbishing and leasing them as "roving ambassadors" to other cities, generating revenue which could then be invested back into the public transport system. In 2011 the Victoria government committed $8 million over four years for the restoration of W class trams, with options for new routes to be considered.

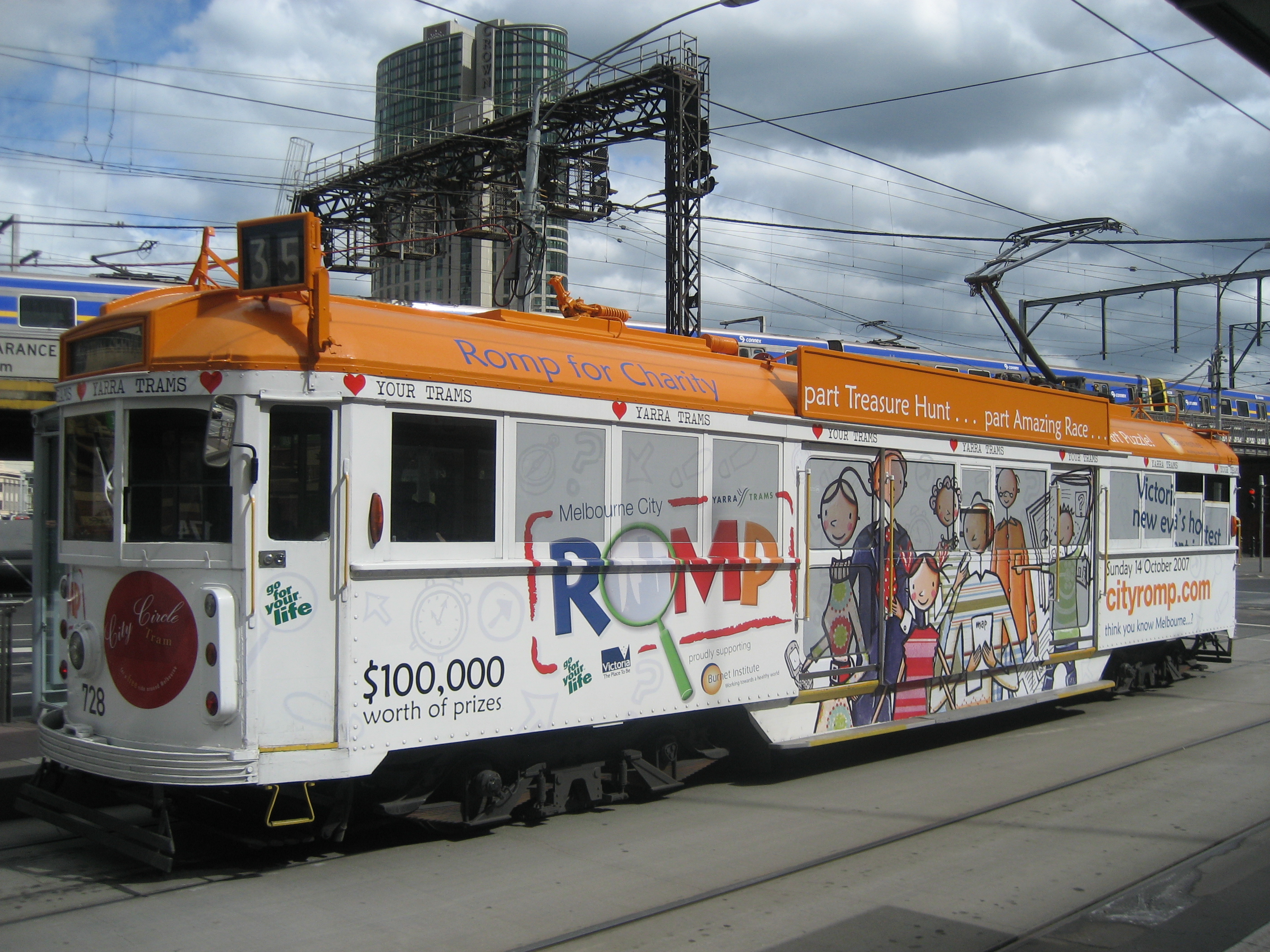
A SW5 class tram on Flinders Street

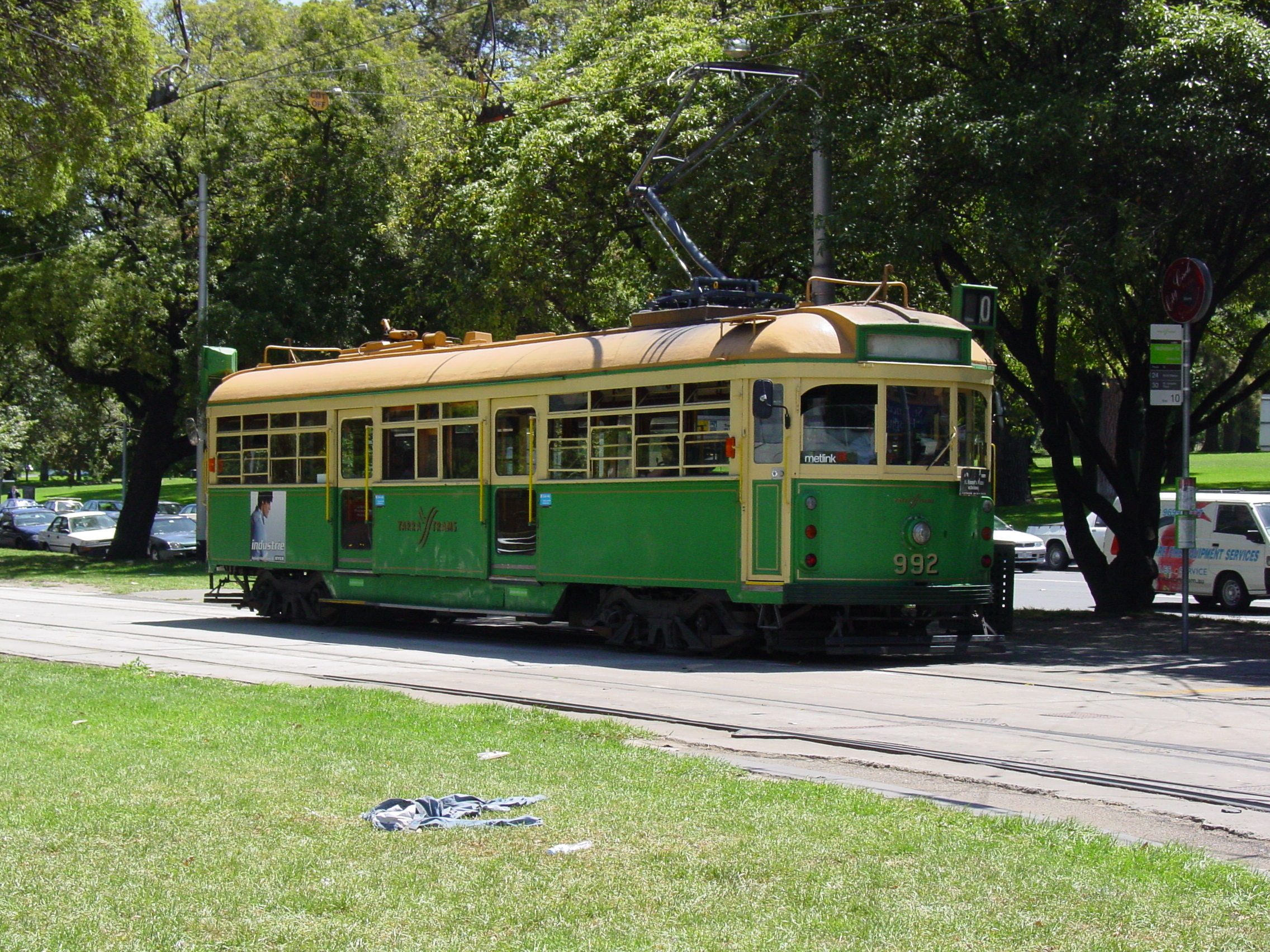
A W6 class tram on Victoria Street

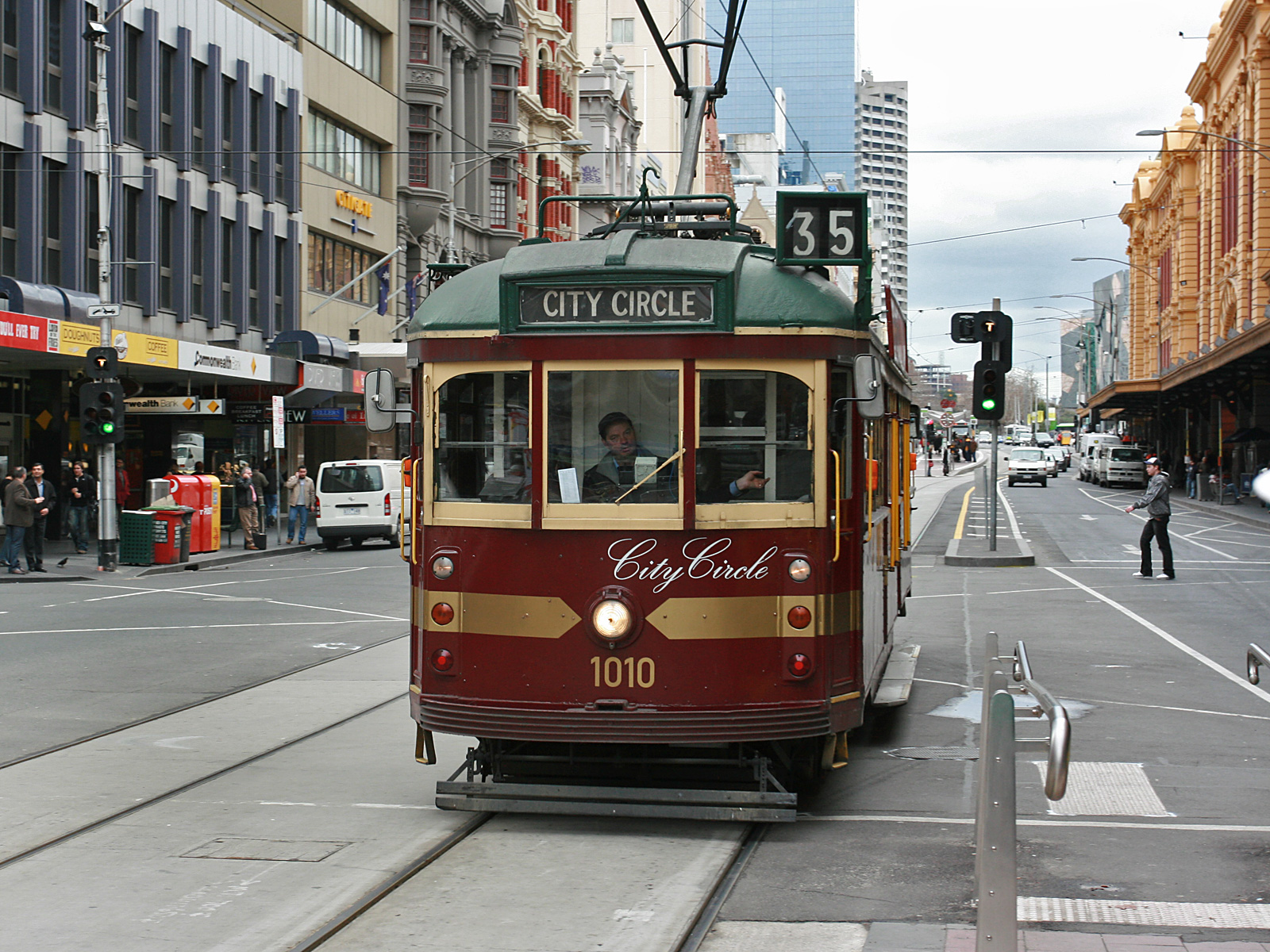
A W7 class tram on Flinders Street

=== Z class ===
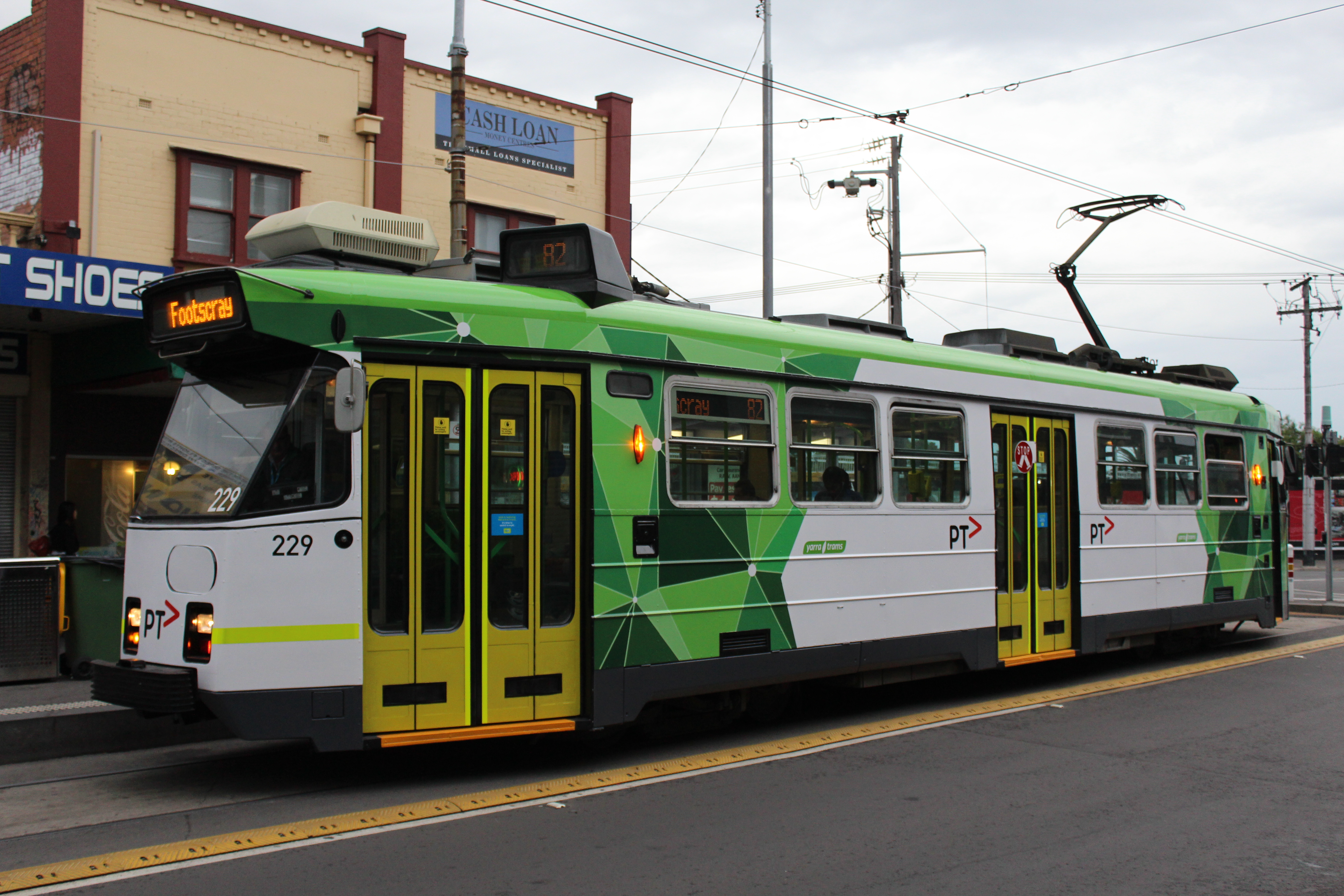
A Z3 class tram waiting at the terminus of the route 82 in Footscray.

The development of new rolling stock to replace the W class began in the early 1970s, employing a modern design, based on the M28 trams running in Gothenburg, Sweden.

The Z class trams, built by Comeng, were introduced in 1975. One hundred Z1 class trams were built between 1975 and 1979, the first 80 or so entering service as Z class before being modified. The design proved unpopular with passengers due to the limited number of doors and the seated conductor. Most of the Z1 class trams were withdrawn following the introduction of the C, D and E class trams, with the last Z1 class being withdrawn on 23 April 2016. Many were later sold at auctions, while others were donated to tram museums.

In 1978 and 1979, fifteen Z2 class trams were built, as a bridging order to maintain construction continuity between the Z1 and Z3 class trams. Some slight modifications were incorporated, the main visible ones being a larger anti-climber bumper and larger opening area for the driver's side-window, otherwise they resemble the Z1 class vehicles. The last Z2 class tram was withdrawn from service on 21 April 2016.

One hundred and fifteen Z3 class trams entered service between 1979 and 1984. They were designed with an additional door on each side of the tram, the rear door improving passenger flow. Different motors and control equipment were fitted, resulting in smoother acceleration and braking compared to the Z1 class. As with the preceding Z1 and Z2 class trams, the conductor's console was removed when one-person operation was introduced in the 1990s. 86 remain in service.

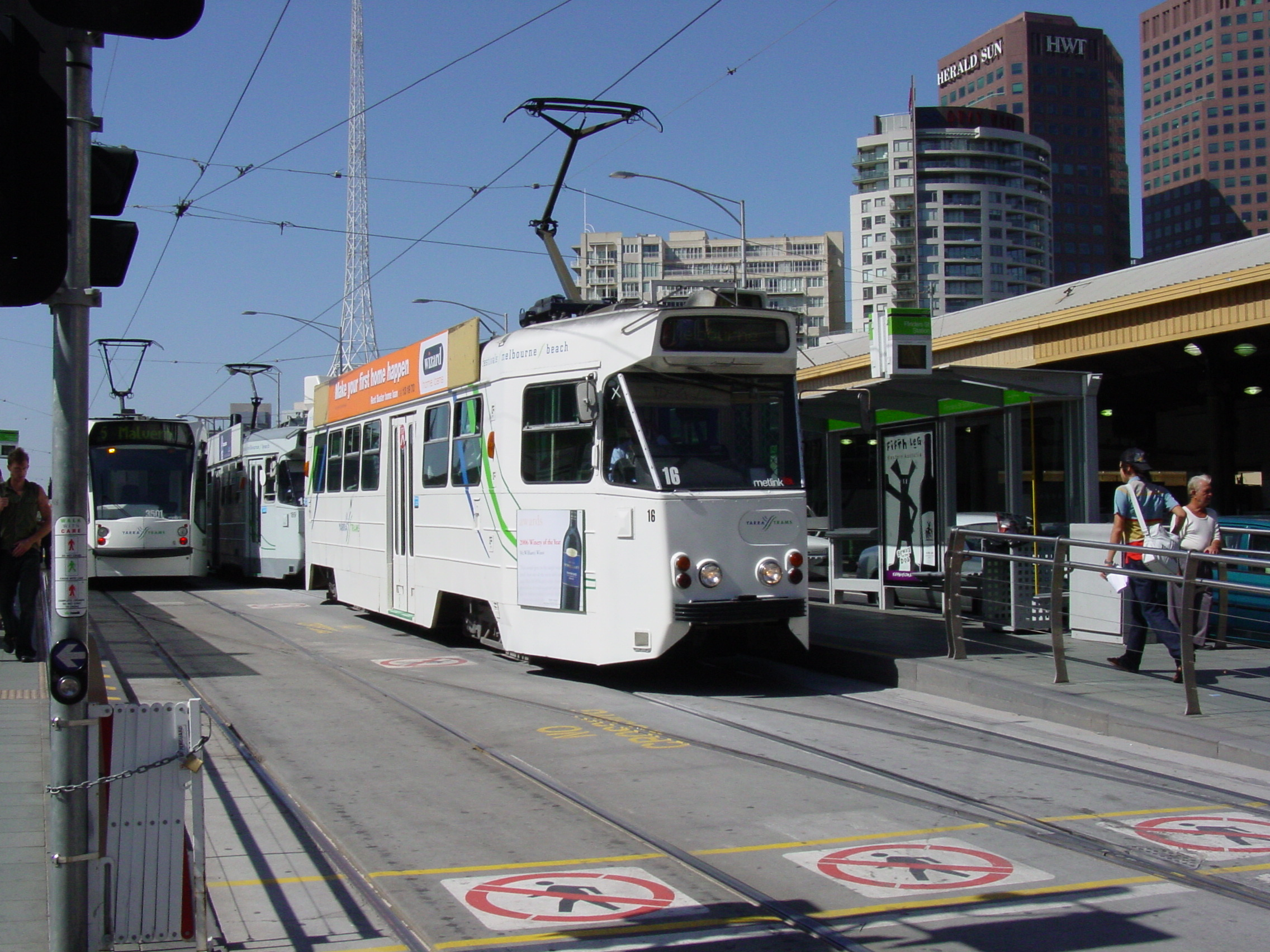
A Z1 class tram at Federation Square, Swanston Street

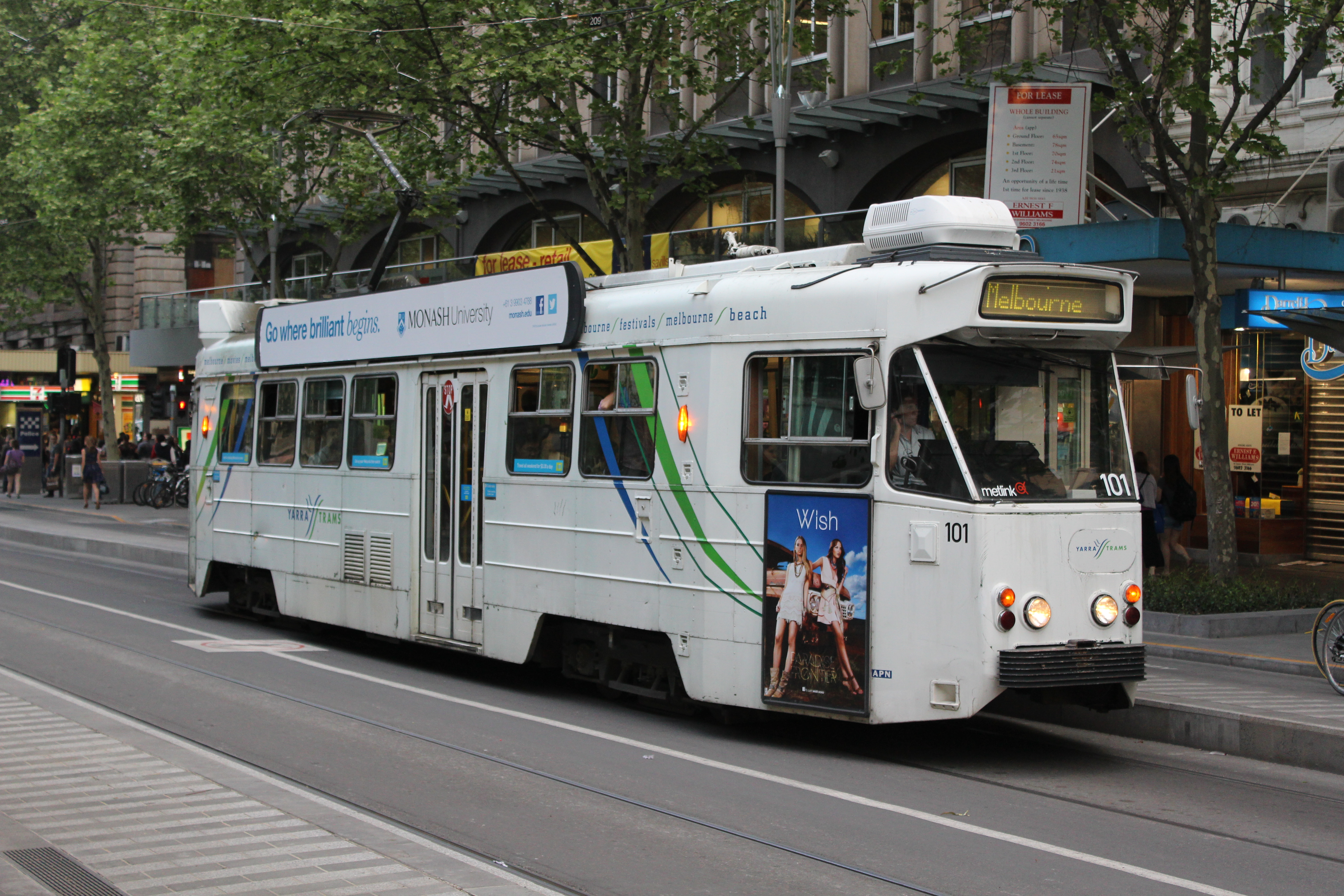
A Z2 class tram at City Square, Swanston Street

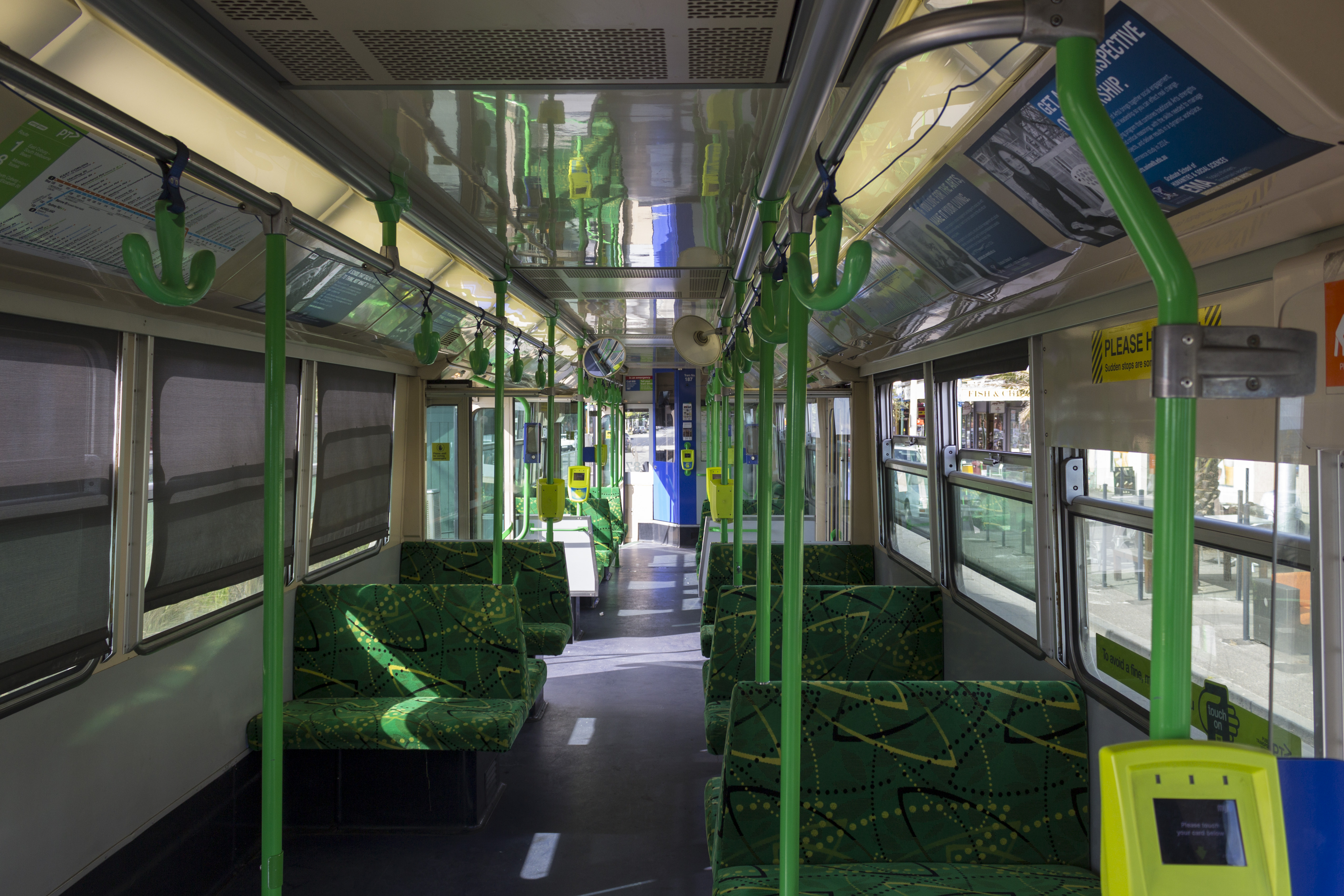
A Z3 class tram interior

=== A class ===
An A2 class tram

The A class trams were built between 1984 and 1987 by Comeng. They were built in two batches: 28 A1 class trams entered service between 1984 and 1985, and 42 A2 class trams between 1985 and 1986. They were similar – the major differences being the brakes, door operating mechanisms, and that the A1 class were built with trolley poles, while A2 class were the first trams for Melbourne that were equipped with pantographs only. All but one that were built remain in service at present.

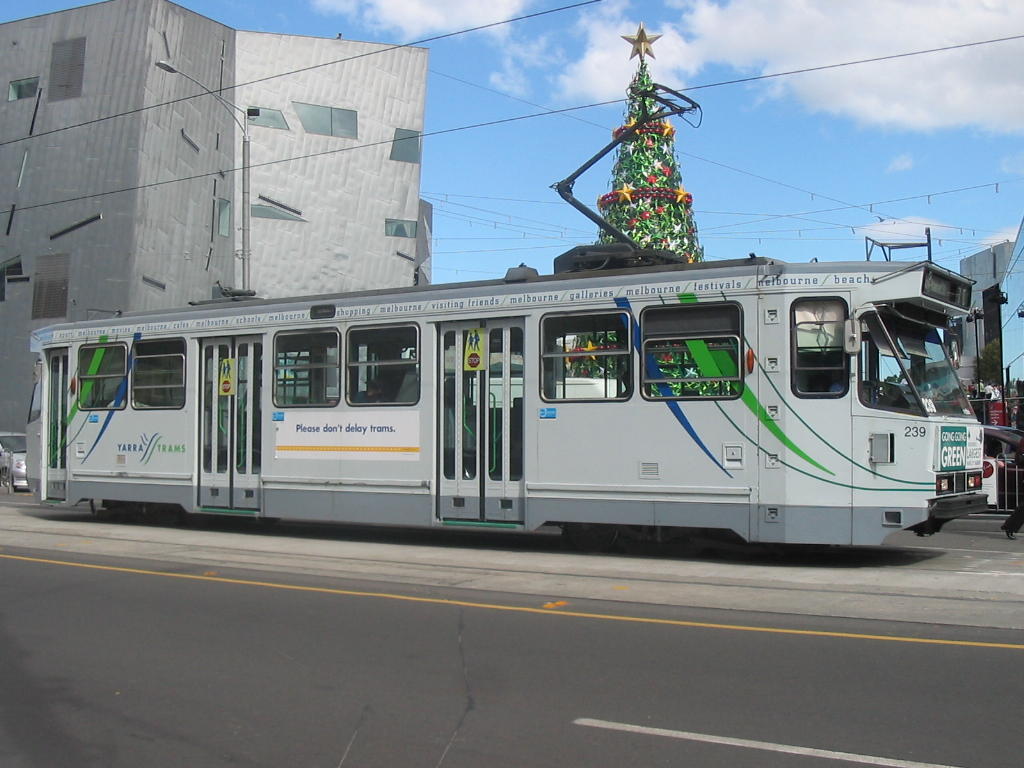
An A1 class tram at Federation Square, Flinders Street

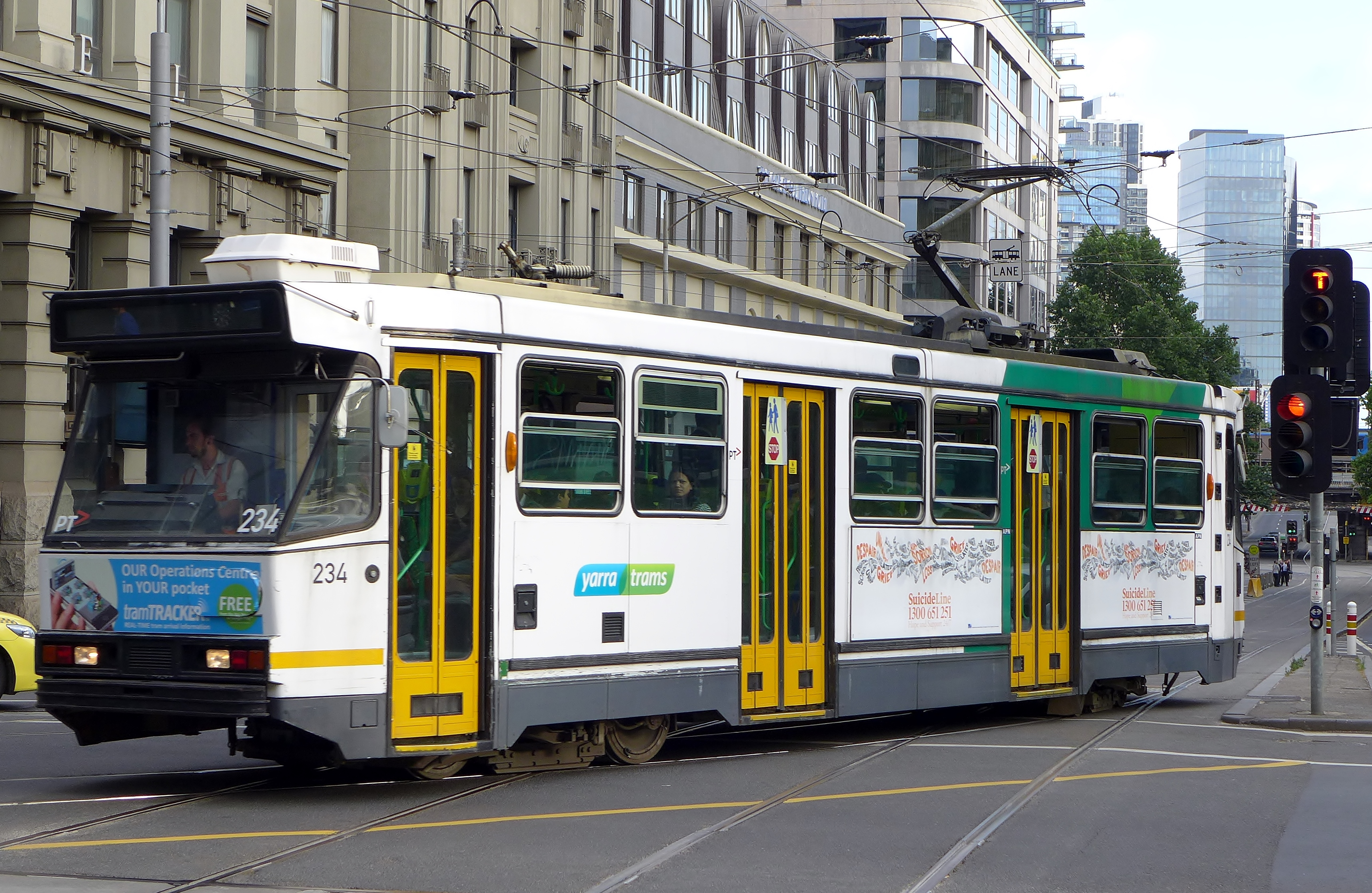
An A1 class tram

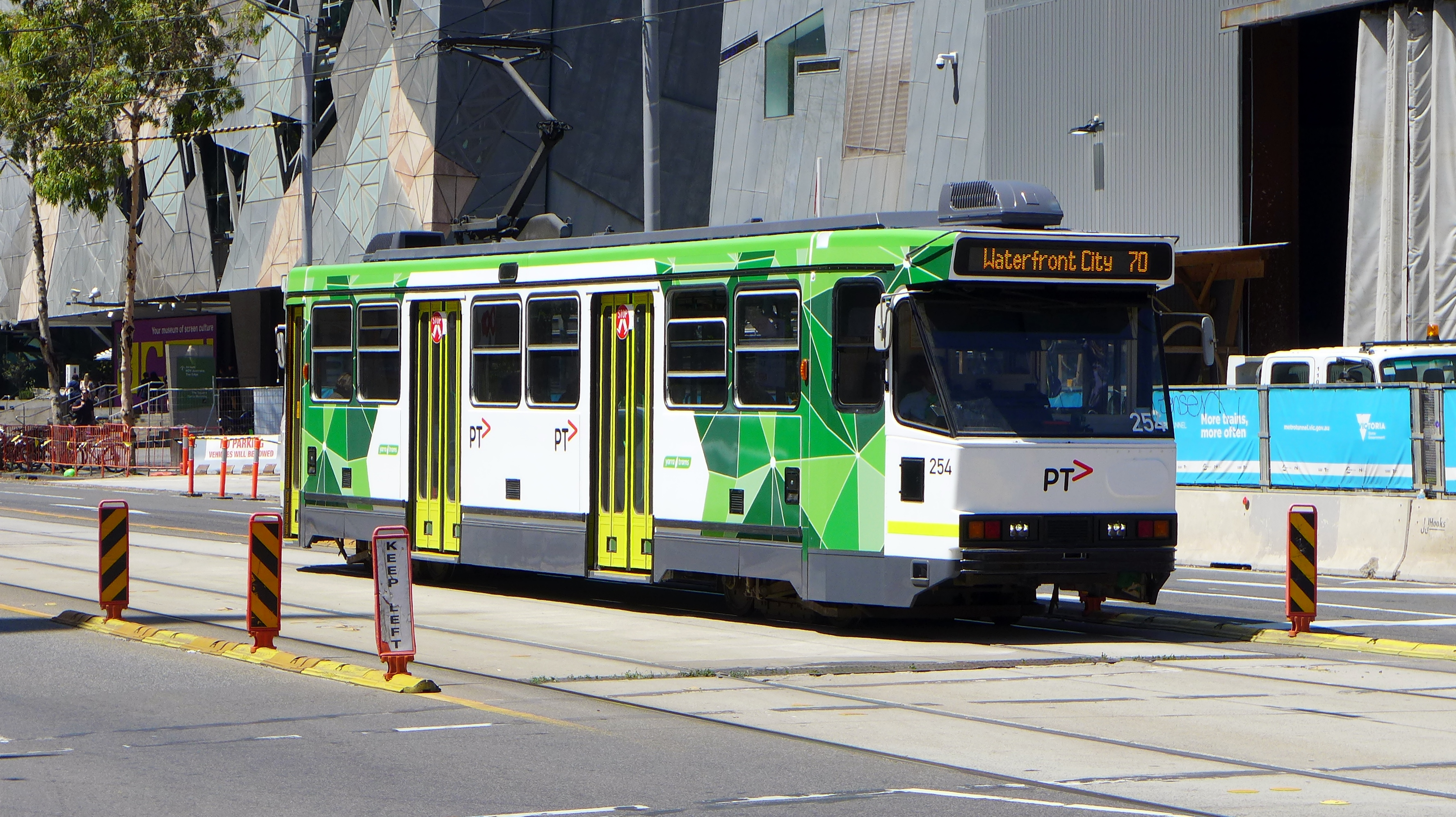
An A2 class tram on Flinders Street

=== B class ===
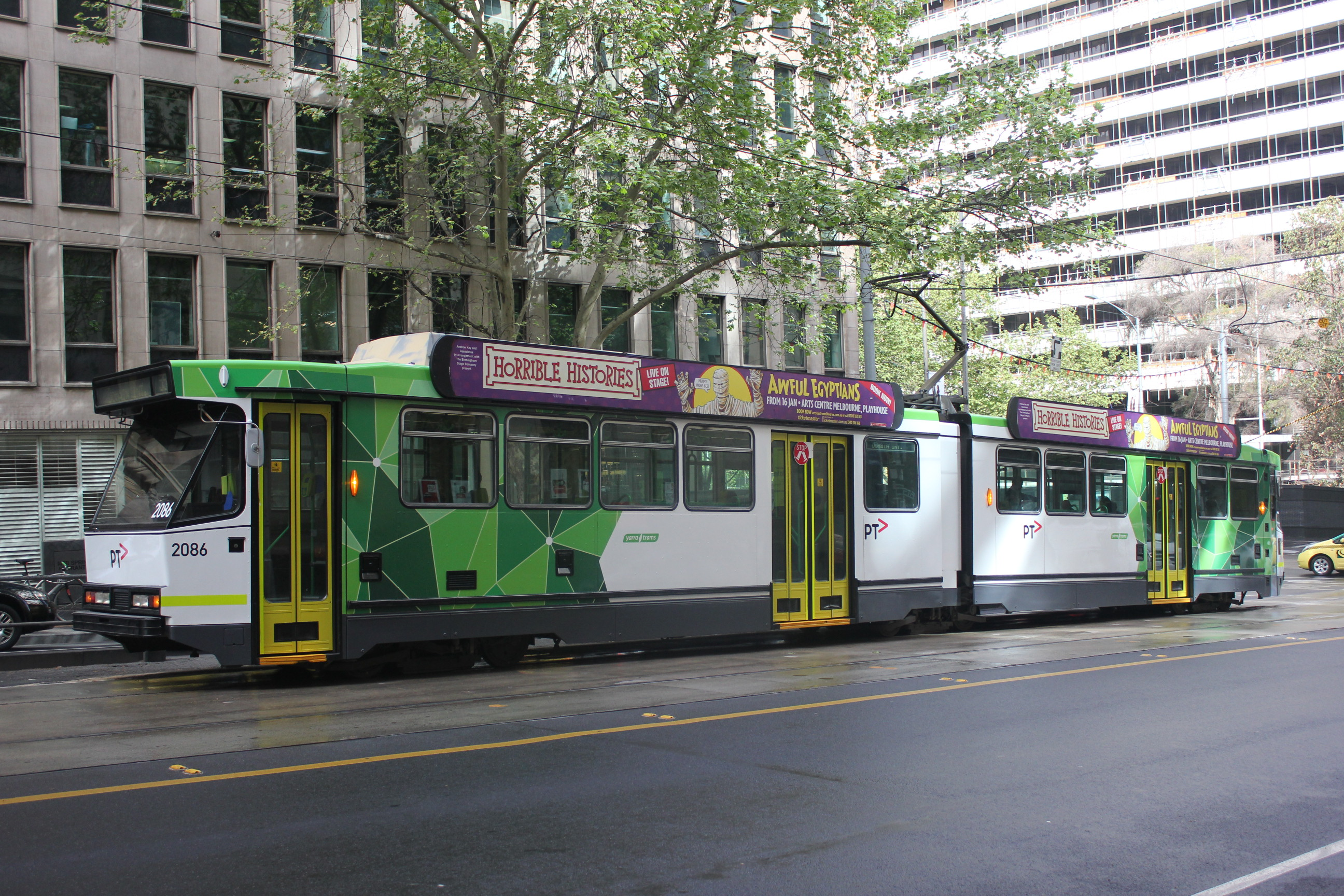
A B2 class tram

Two B1 class trams were built as part of the order for 28 A1 class trams in 1984 and 1985. The B class trams used the same traction equipment as the Z3 and A class trams, and were designed for operating on the light rail lines. They were originally built with both trolley poles and pantographs, as well as movable steps to allow railway platform and street level boarding, however this concept was later abandoned when low-floor platforms replaced railway-height ones at the converted light rail stations. Both B1 class trams were withdrawn in 2018.

B2 class trams entered service between 1988 and 1994, differing from the B1 class prototypes by not having trolley poles, having dot-matrix destination displays, and non-opening windows. 130 trams were built by Comeng, and later ABB; all of which remain in service today. The B2 class was the first Melbourne tram fitted with air conditioning.

B class trams were the first articulated trams to serve on the Melbourne network.

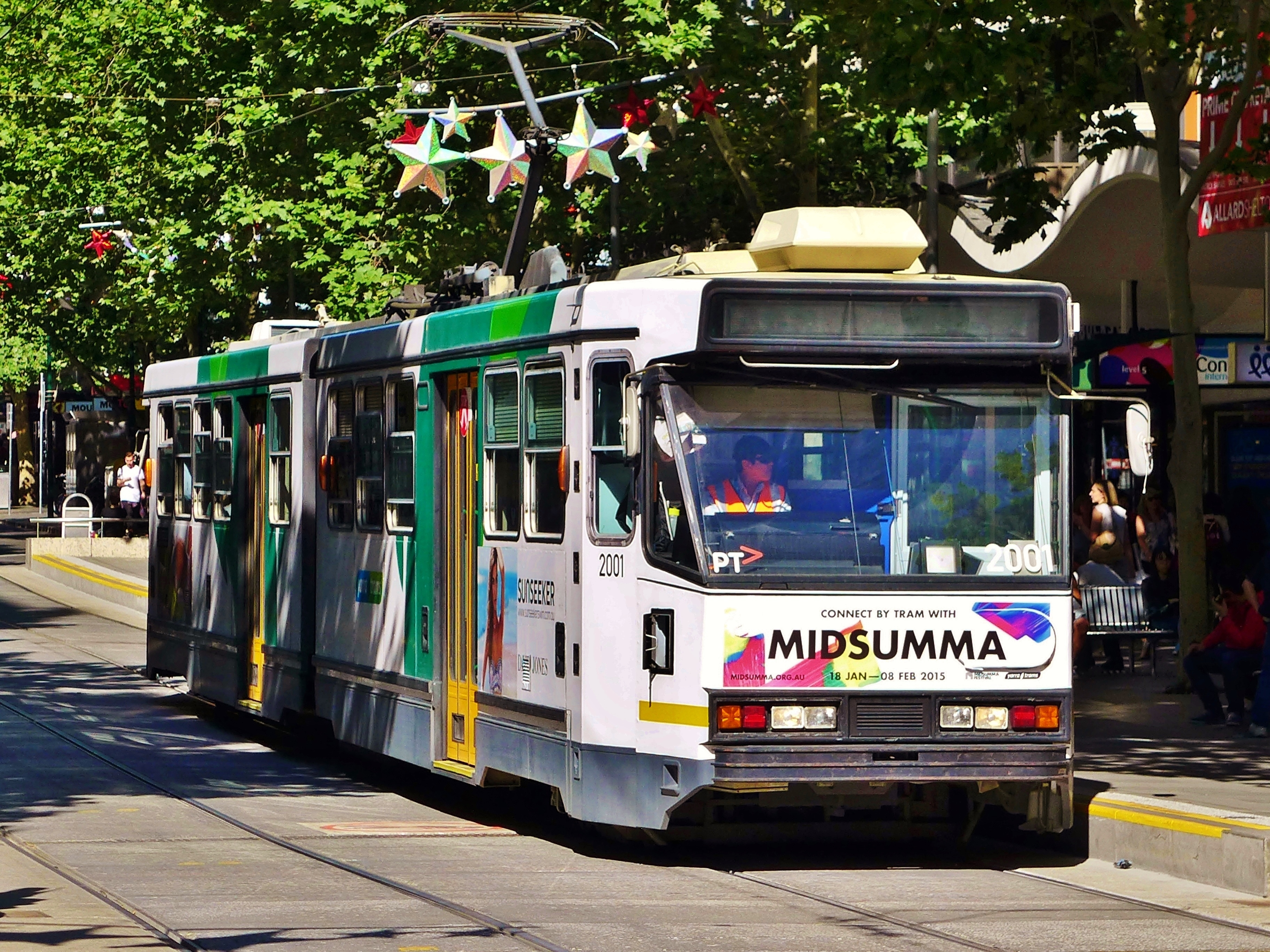
B1 class tram #2001

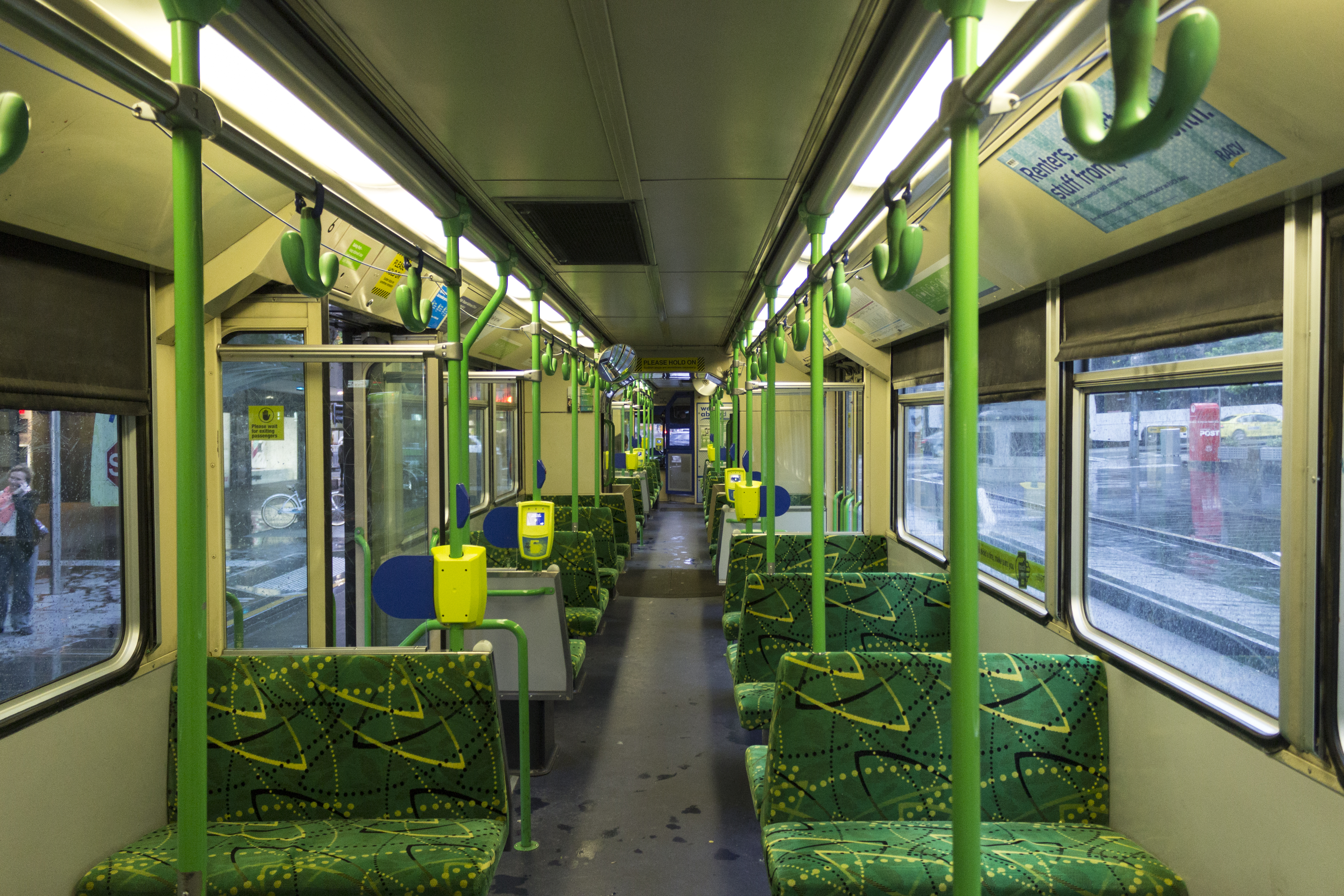
A B2 class tram interior

=== C class (Citadis) ===
Following the privatisation of Melbourne's tram system in 1999, the private operators acquired new trams to replace the older Z class trams. In 2001, Yarra Trams introduced the low-floor C1 class trams, a variant of the Citadis manufactured in France by Alstom. They are three-section articulated vehicles, with 36 in service.

Five C2 class trams, a five-section articulated variant of the Alstom Citadis, began running in Melbourne in 2008 after being leased from Mulhouse in France. They were dubbed 'Bumble Bees' due to the distinctive yellow colour scheme they carried when first introduced, and run exclusively on route 96. In November 2010 it was announced that the state government was in negotiations to purchase the five C2 class trams, with the purchase finalised in 2013. They can hold 54 seated passengers and 150 standing passengers.

The C1 class trams are owned by Allco entity and are subject to a lease purchase agreement, while the C2 class trams were initially leased from Société Générale entity, they were subsequently purchased by the Victorian Government in the 2012–2013 financial year.

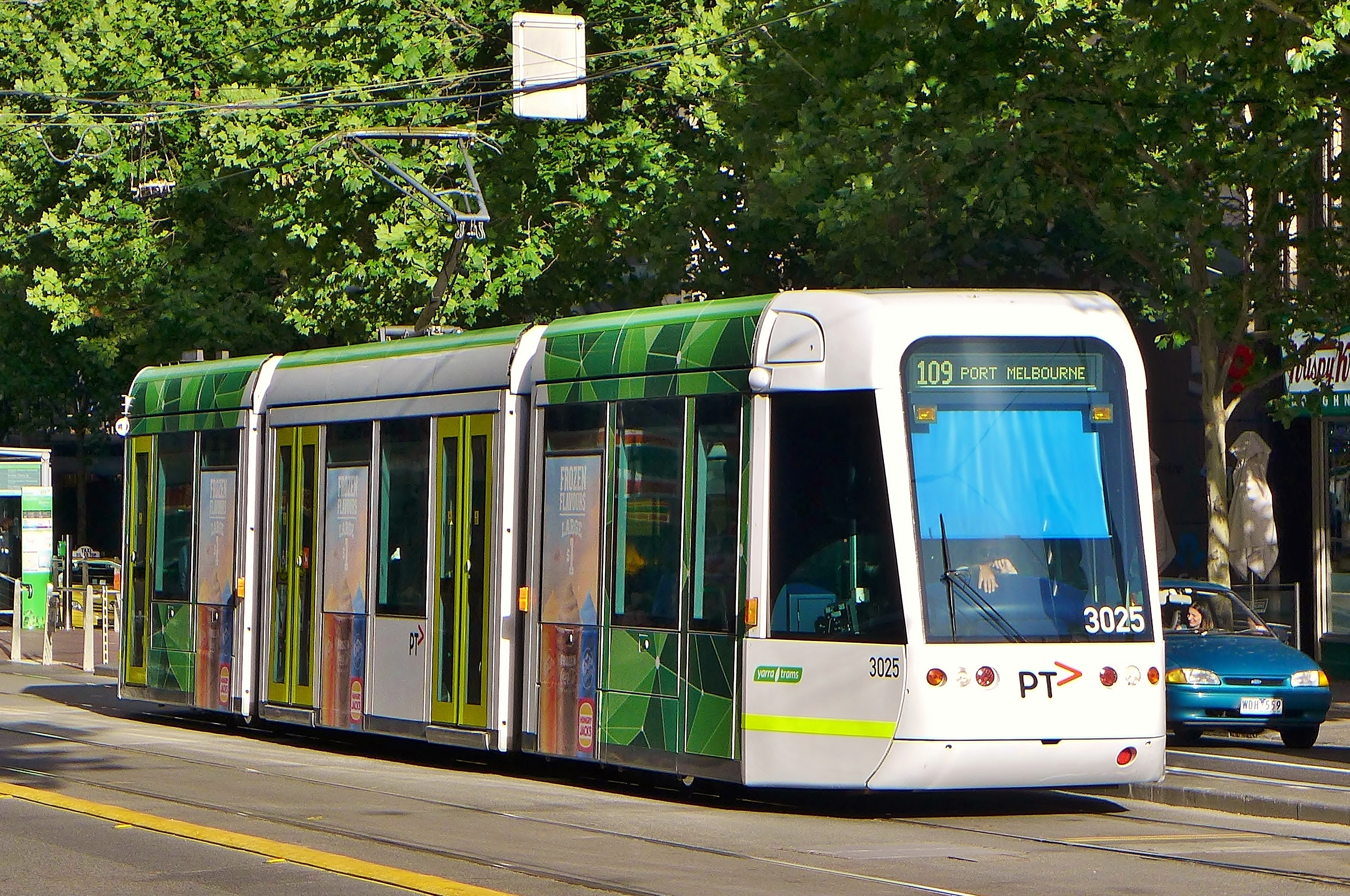
A C1 class tram

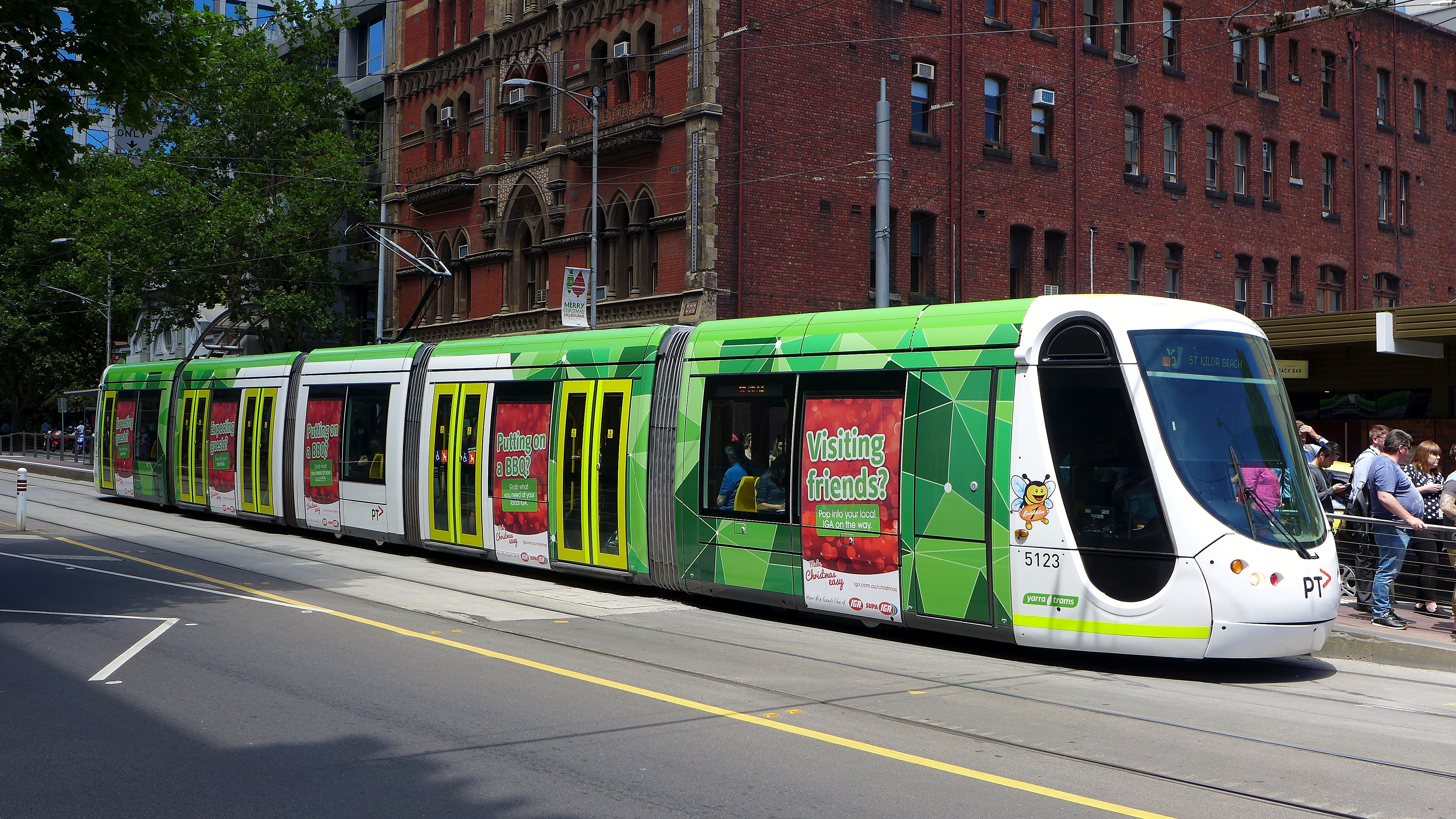
A C2 class tram

=== D class (Combino) ===
The German-made Siemens Combino trams were introduced by the now defunct M>Tram between 2002 and 2004. The Combino is a three-section (D1 class) or five-section (D2 class) low-floor articulated vehicle.

The D class trams are subject to a lease purchase agreement.

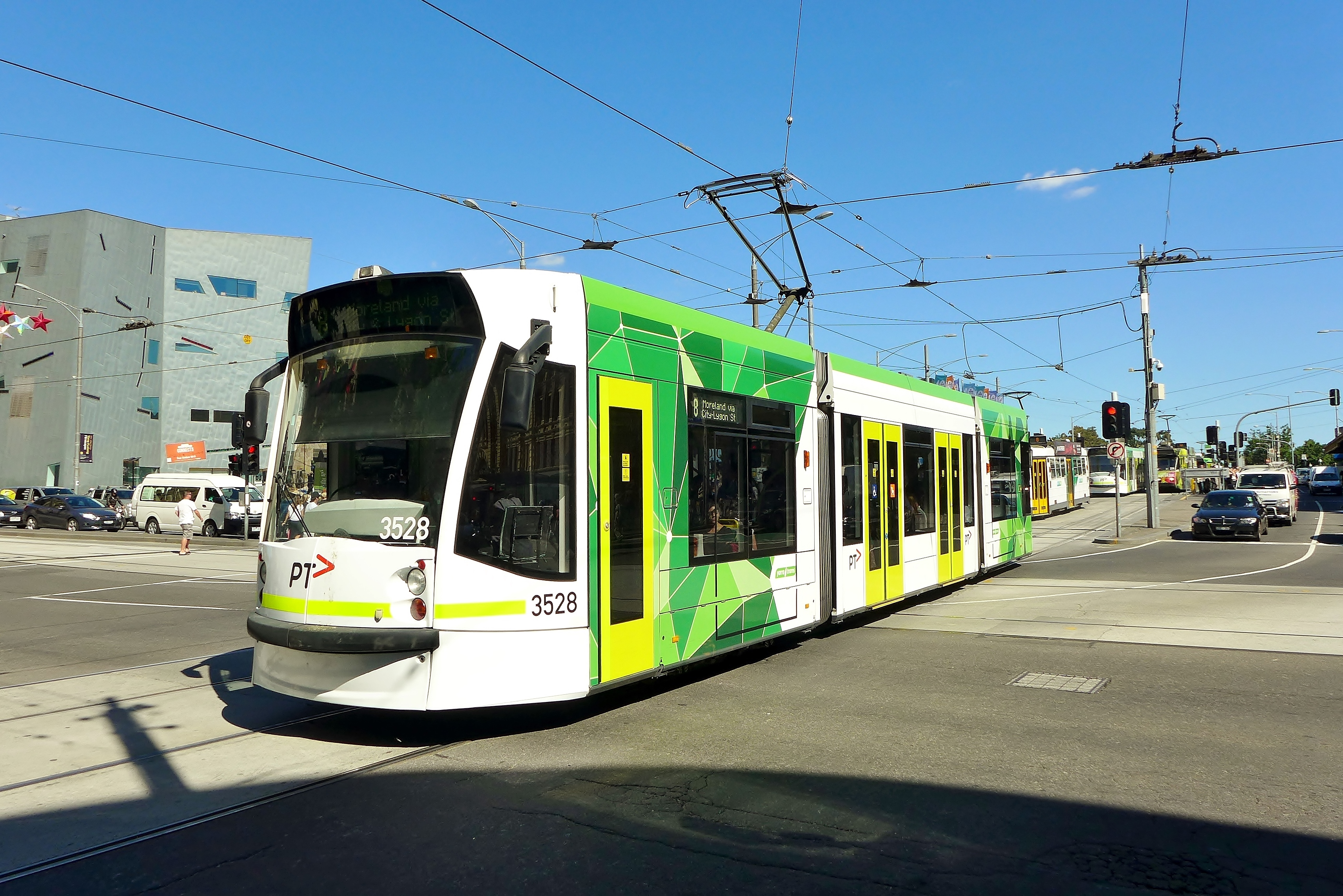
A D1 class tram

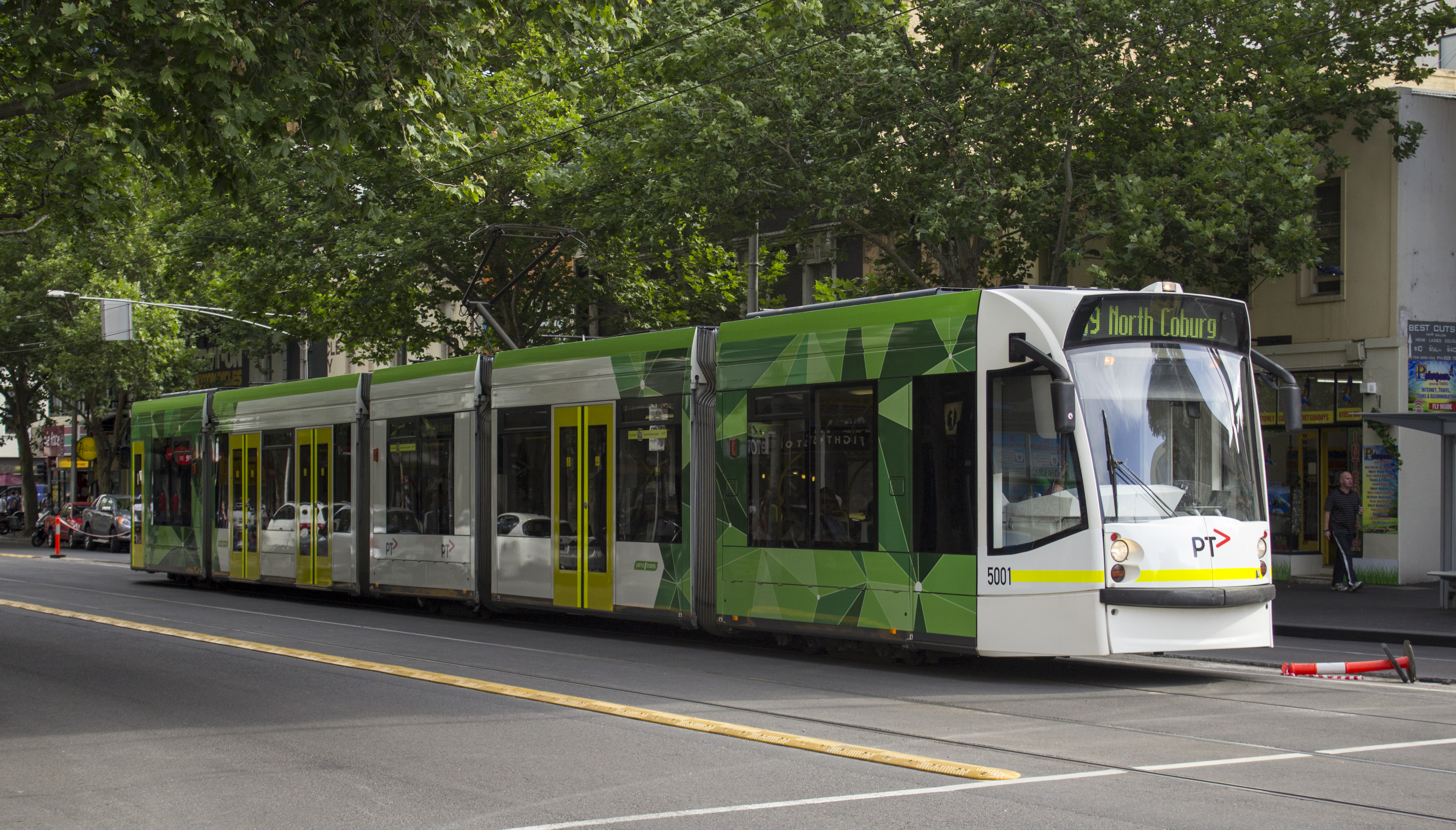
A D2 class tram

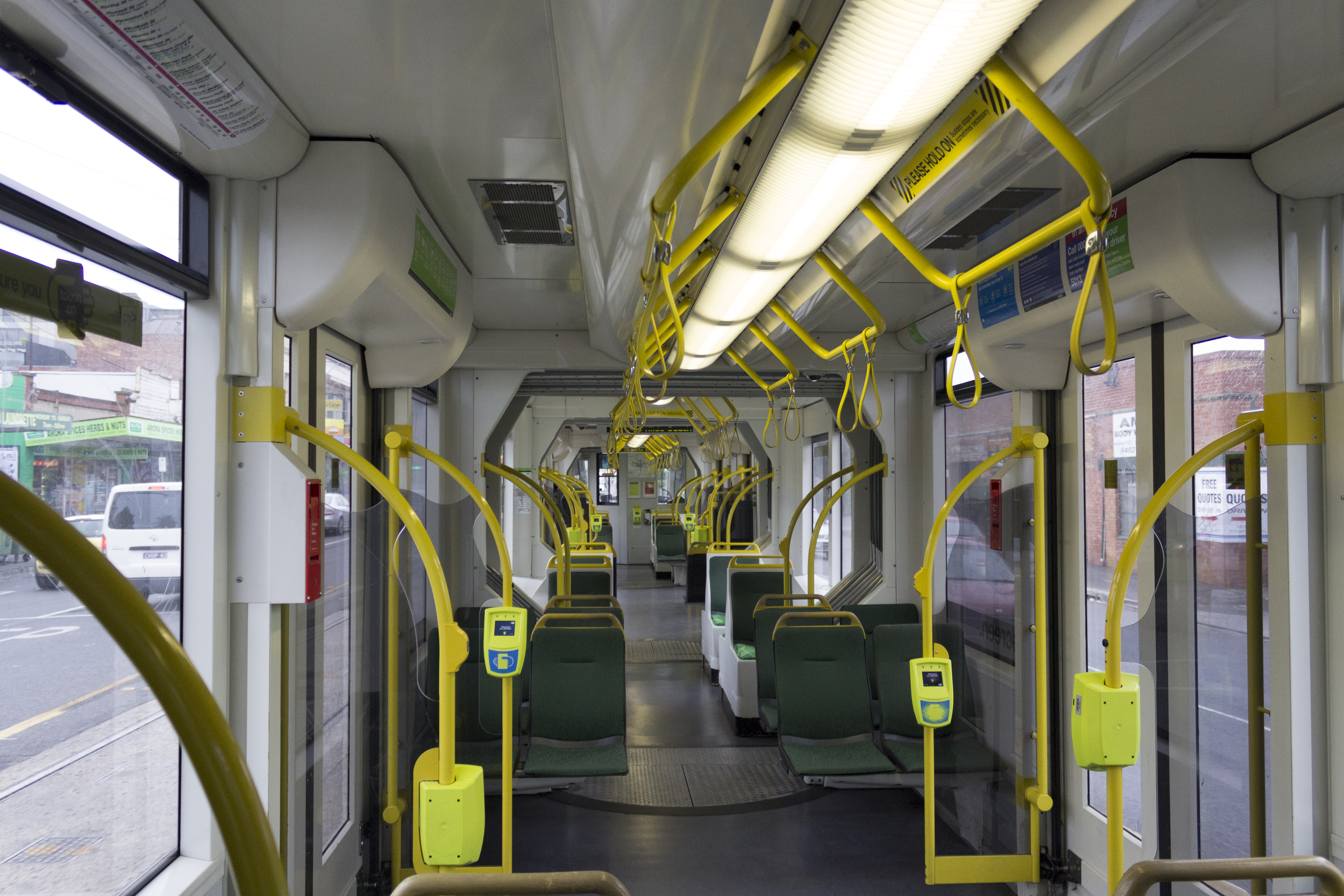
A D2 class tram interior

=== E class (Flexity) ===
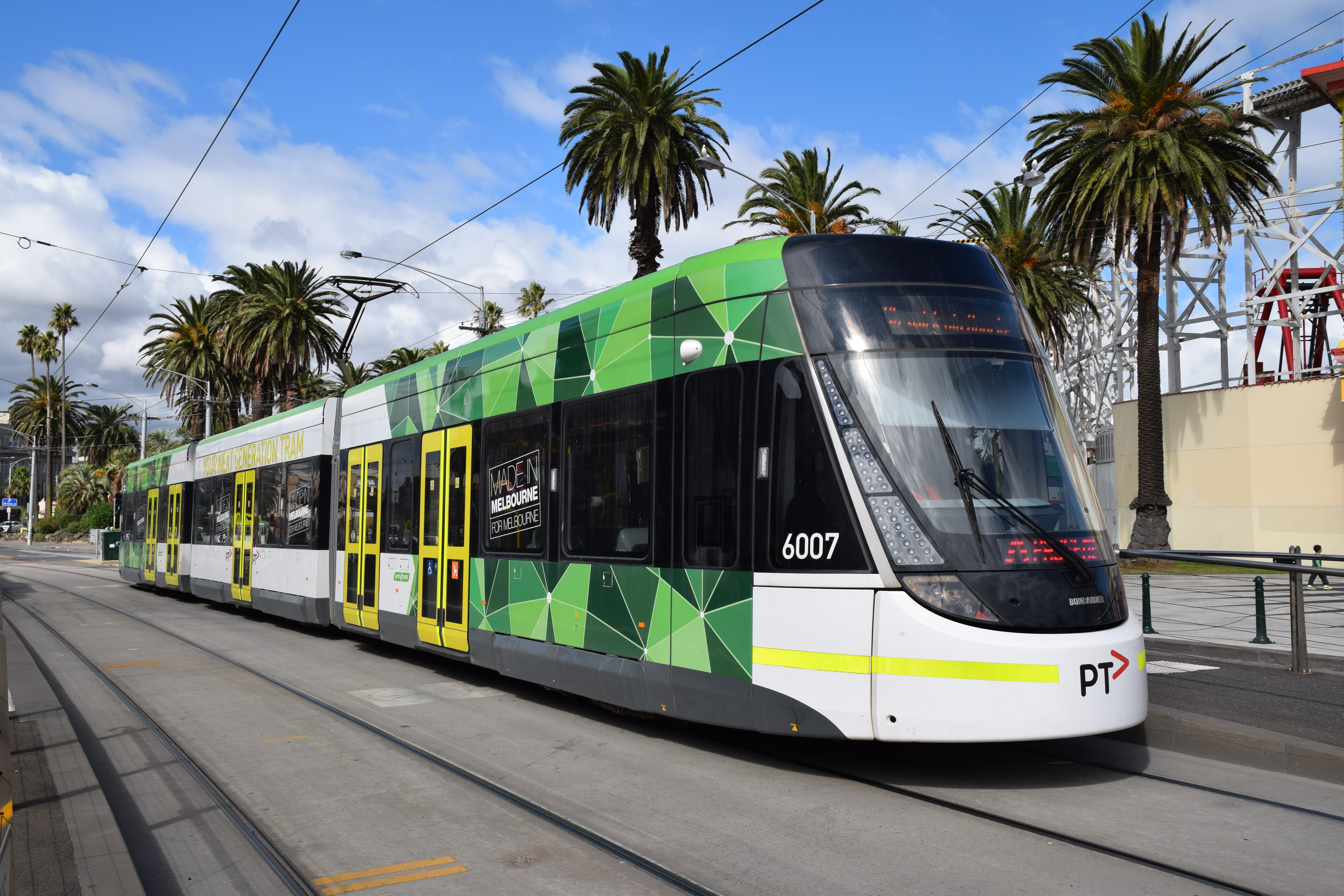
An E1 class tram in St Kilda

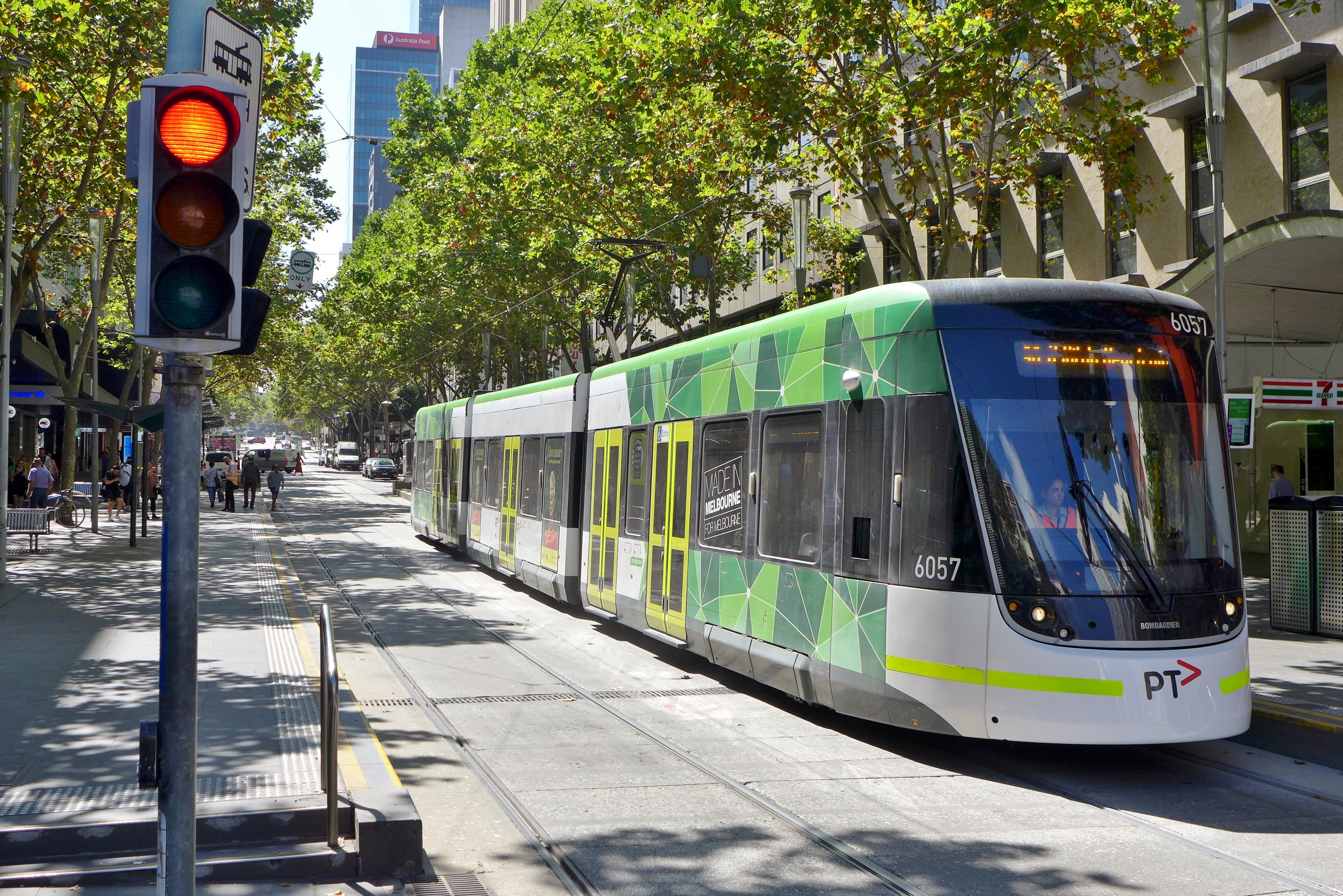
An E2 class tram in Bourke Street

The E class are three-section, four-bogie articulated trams, based on the Bombardier Flexity Swift design and built at Bombardier Transportation's Dandenong factory. The propulsion systems and bogies were imported from Bombardier's Mannheim and Siegen factories in Germany. Bombardier was selected on 27 September 2010 following a tendering process for 50 new low-floor trams, which was opened in 2009. The $303 million contract was for supply of 50 trams with maintenance to 2017, and included an option for a further 100 trams. The E class trams are the first locally built Melbourne trams since the B class in 1994.

E class trams are 33 metres long and 2.65 metres wide, have anti-slip flooring, are air-conditioned, have automatic audio-visual announcements and a passenger capacity of 210. A two-thirds mock up, produced for design input, was unveiled on 24 August 2011 and was displayed at the 2011 Royal Melbourne Show. Although originally anticipated to be delivered in 2012, design complexity slowed down construction, delaying delivery of the first tram.

The first two E1 class trams entered service on 4 November 2013, and the last of the fifty on 24 April 2017. In May 2015, the State Government announced it had partially taken up the option, ordering a further 20 to a slightly modified design; the first of these entered service on 13 June 2017. This updated design focused on improved safety, in response to a significant increase in passenger injuries, and implemented measures such as glare reduction to allow improved road visibility for drivers and extra handholds and grab rails for passengers. Further extensions to this order have since been made, and as of 1 October 2021 there are 50 E2 class trams in service. A total of 100 E class trams are currently in service.

=== G class (Next Generation Trams) ===
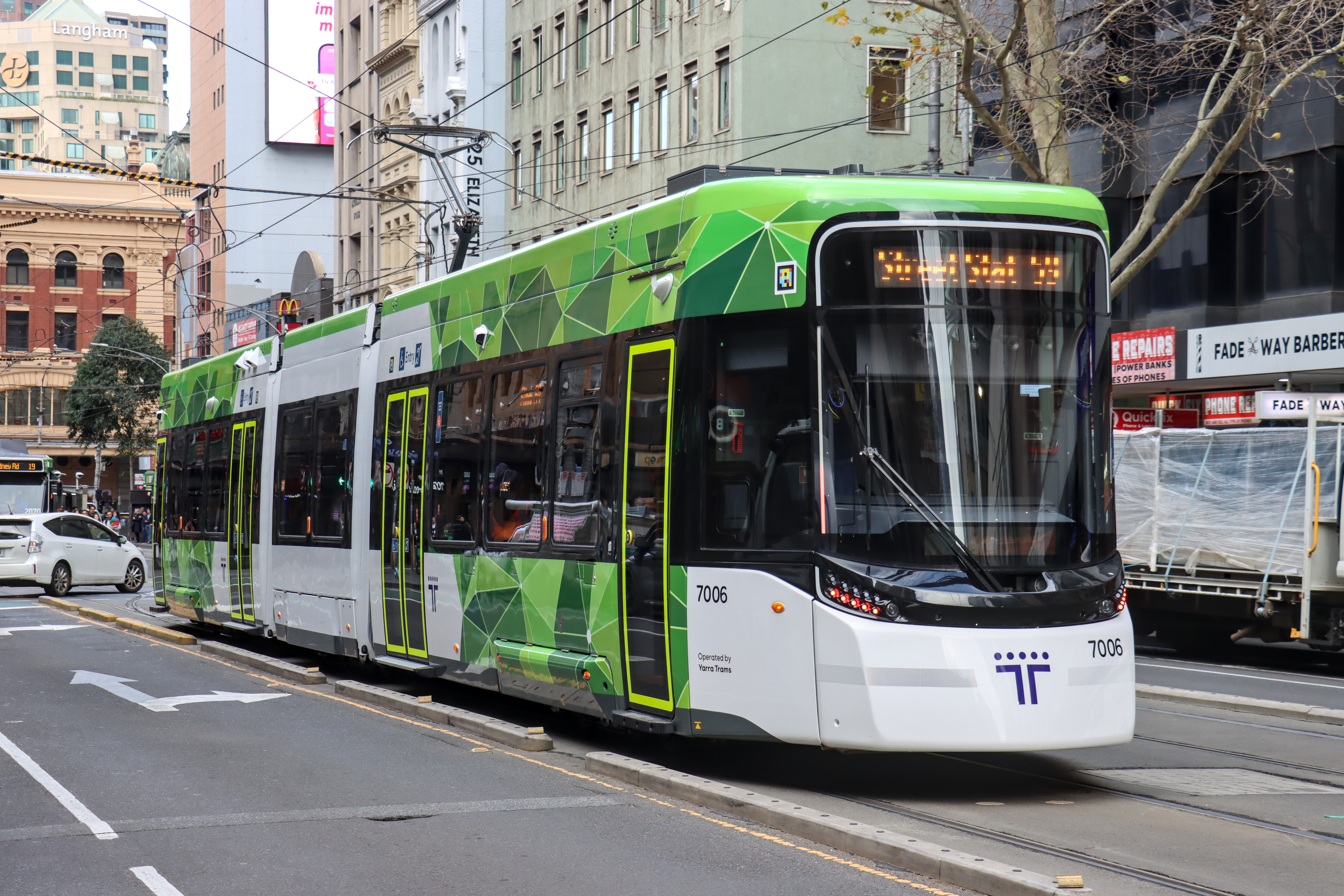
G class tram number 7006 operating a Route 59 service on Elizabeth Street at Flinders Lane on the first day of passenger service.

In November 2020, plans were announced for 100 Next Generation Trams in the 2020 Victorian Budget, at a cost of around $1.5 billion. Alstom and a joint venture comprising UGL Rail and CAF were shortlisted to design and build these new trams, with the first of the new models entering service in 2025. The new low floor trams will replace the older classes of trams, which are not accessible due to their high floor designs. They are shorter than the E class at 25 metres in length, with an option for a 35 metre long version. They have a capacity of 150 passengers with seating for 48 and include on-board batteries and regenerative braking technology, the first for a tram in Melbourne. This results in lower power consumption than the larger E class trams so as not to require new power or traction infrastructure.

In April 2022 the Victorian Government announced that Alstom would build 100 new trams and provide 15 years of maintenance. As part of the $1.85 billion project, a new stabling and maintenance facility will be constructed at Maidstone in Melbourne's west to house the new trams. The trams are based on the Bombardier Flexity 2 design, customised to Melbourne's network, and include 65% locally made content. The tram order is the largest in Australian history.

The first tram commenced regular passenger service on 30 July 2026 on route 59. The other two routes to initially operate the G class will be routes 57 and 82, followed by routes 12, 48 and 58.

== Patronage ==
The following table lists patronage figures for the network during the corresponding financial year. Australia's financial years start on 1 July and end on 30 June. Major events that affected the number of journeys made or how patronage is measured are included as notes.

Melbourne tram patronage by financial year
2000s	Year	2000–01	2001–02	2002–03	2003–04	2004–05	2005–06	2006–07	2007–08	2008–09	2009–10
2000s	Patronage (millions)	129.4	131.9	134.7	135.9	145.3 (Note: Patronage estimates use a different methodology from 2004–05, resulting in a "step-change" in patronage estimates from 2003–04 to 2004–05.)	149.6 (Note: Figures exclude additional patronage associated with the 2006 Commonwealth Games.)	154.9	158.3	178.1	175.5
2000s	Reference										
2010s	Year	2010–11	2011–12	2012–13	2013–14	2014–15	2015–16	2016–17	2017–18	2018-19	2019-20
2010s	Patronage (millions)	182.7	191.6	182.7	176.9	182.1	203.8	204.0	206.3	205.4	141.8 (Note: Patronage was severely impacted by the COVID-19 pandemic.)
2010s	Reference										
2020s	Year	2020–21	2021–22	2022-23	2023-24	2024-2025					
2020s	Patronage (millions)	60.2	82.9	147.6	154.8	160.2					
2020s	Reference										

View source data.

== Depots ==
Melbourne's trams run out of nine depots.

	Depot	Routes	Trams
A photo of Brunswick tram depot shed, with a handful of Z class trams inside	Brunswick	1; 6 (Shared with Malvern); 19	10 Z3 Class; 21 B2 Class; 21 D2 Class
A photo of Camberwell tram depot shed, with one tram, a B class tram inside	Camberwell	70; 75	4 A1 Class; 20 A2 Class; 40 B2 Class
Essendon tram depot, viewed from the southern gate, 2013	Essendon	57; 58 (Shared with Southbank); 59; 82	34 Z3 Class; 28 B2 Class
A photo of the main entrance for Glenhuntly tram depot. There is double track up the right hand side, leading to the sheds in the back.	Glenhuntly	3; 64; 67	9 Z3 Class; 41 B2 Class
A photo of Kew tram depot. There is one C class stabled and another C class is passing the depot on Barkers Road.	Kew	48; 78; 109	20 A2 Class; 36 C Class
A photo of Maidstone tram depot	Maidstone	59 (Shared with Essendon)	6 G Class
A photo of Malvern tram depot	Malvern	5; 6 (Shared with Brunswick); 16; 72	47 Z3 Class; 38 D1 Class
A photo of Preston Workshops	Preston	11; 86; 96 (Shared with Southbank)	48 E Class; 24 E2 Class
A photo of Southbank tram depot yard. C2, W, and A class trams are stabled inside	Southbank	12; 30; 35 (City Circle); 58 (Shared with Essendon); 96 (Shared with Preston)	3 SW6 Class; 12 W8 Class; 23 A1 Class; 2 A2 Class; 5 C2 Class; 2 E Class; 26 E2 Class
Source: Vicsig

== Power supply ==
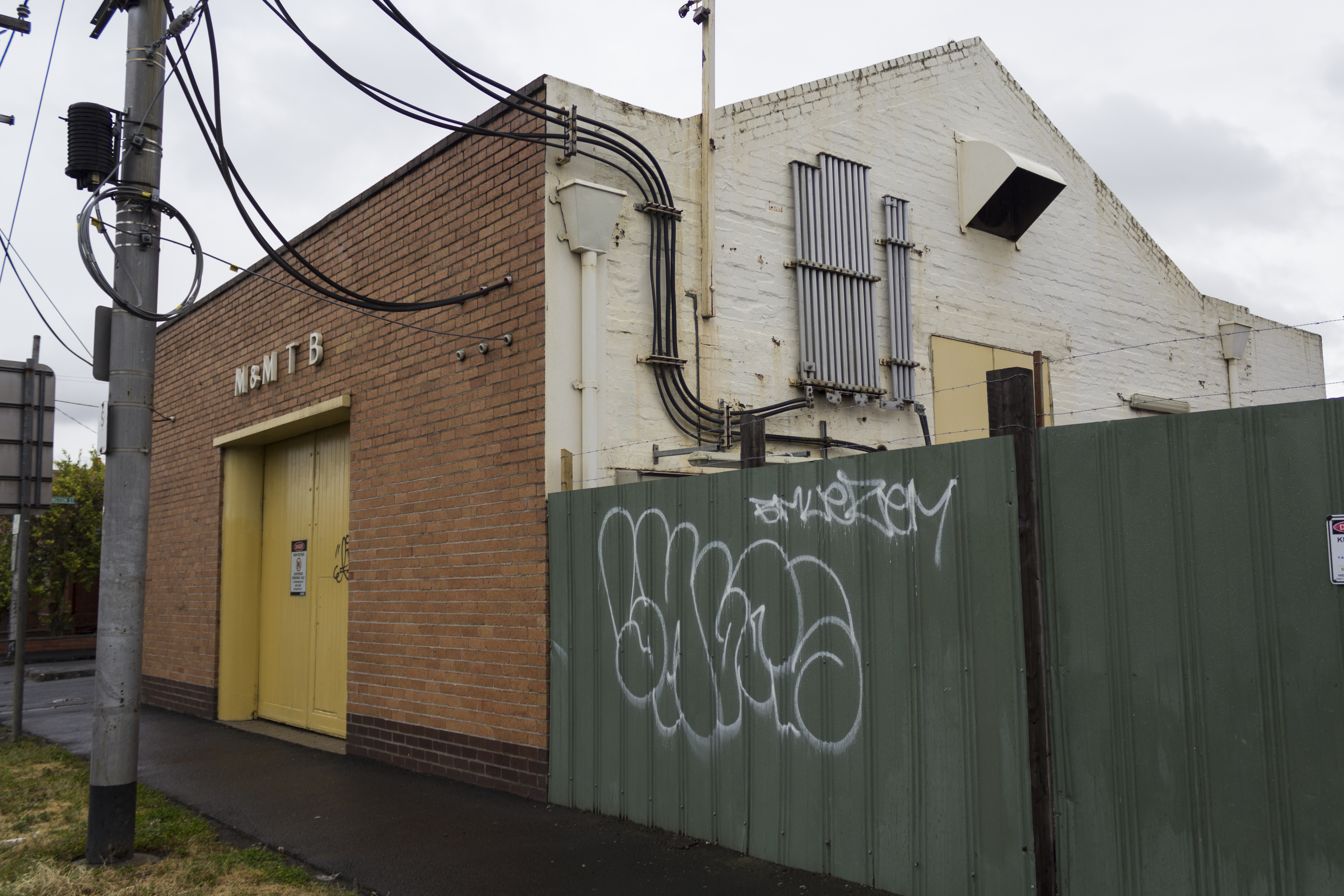
A tramway substation in Fitzroy North

Melbourne's tram system operates on 600 volt DC electricity, provided to the overhead lines by 60 (as of March 2021) substations spread across the network. Electricity is supplied to these substations in either 6.6, 11, or 22 kilovolt 50 hertz AC and is then stepped down, and rectified to 600 volt DC. The overhead system is further separated into 100 sections, this is done both to maintain voltage and current across the network, and to isolate disruptions when issues relating to the electrical transmission system occur. The most common disturbances to the supply system are over height vehicles, falling tree limbs, damaged poles, and fires nearby to overhead wires.

Since 2013 Yarra Trams have been provisioning for the upgrade of substations across the network. This is due to the increased amount of current required by newer trams such as the E class and other low-floor trams scheduled for wider deployment across the system. Additionally, they are concurrently planning for the further segmentation of the supply network; further isolating disruptions caused by disturbance to the supply system.

In January 2017, the state government announced tenders to power Melbourne's tram network with solar power, to be supplied at Mildura with a new 75 MW solar power plant by the end of 2018.

== Tram–train level crossings ==
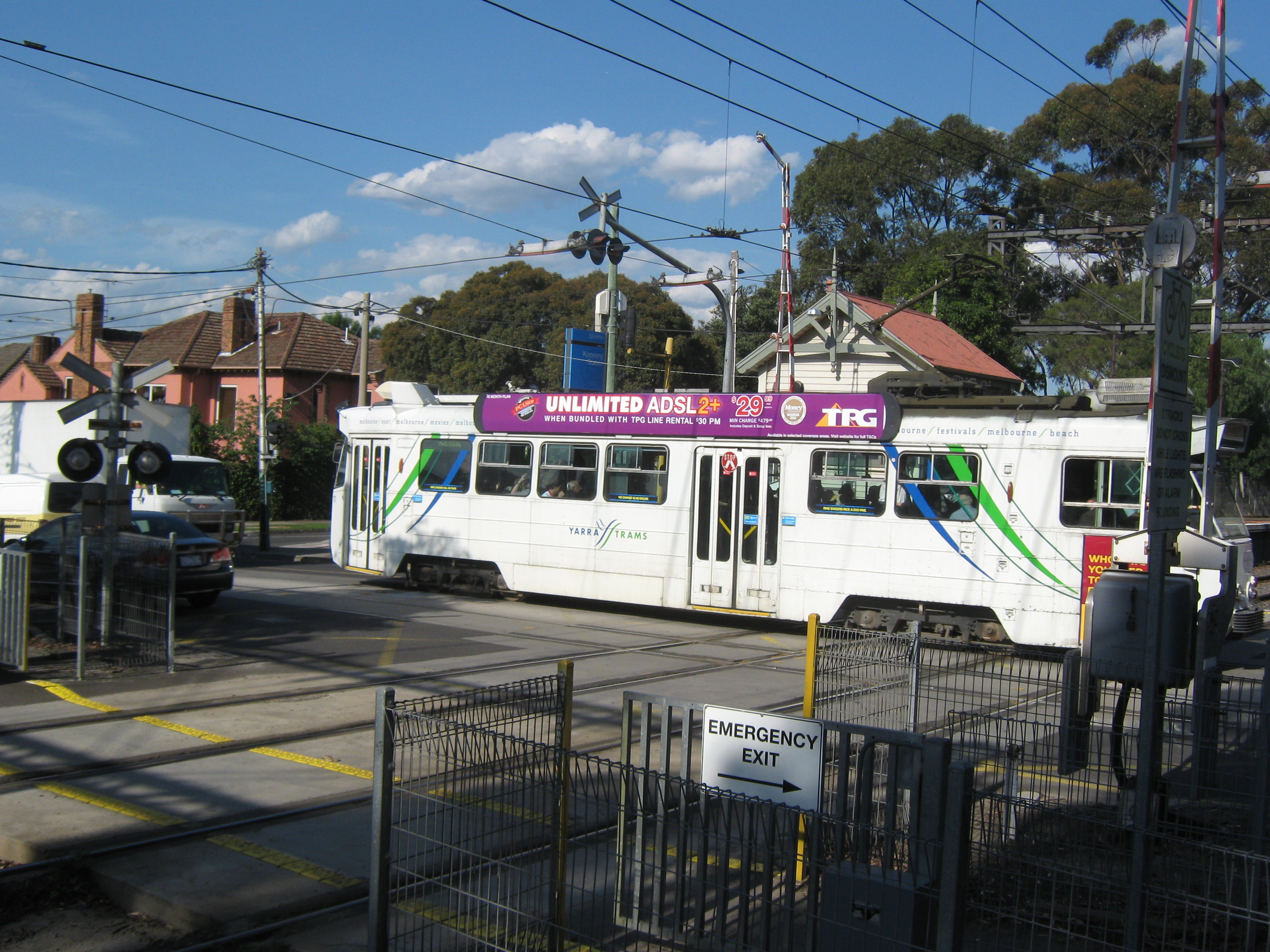
Z2 101 crossing Kooyong station level crossing

There are currently two level crossings where trams and trains cross each other: Glenferrie Road, Kooyong; and Riversdale Road, Camberwell. Two more recently existed, one at Burke Road, Glen Iris, operated until 2015, when it was removed along with Gardiner station as part of the Level Crossing Removal Project, and one at Glen Huntly Road, Glen Huntly, operated until 2023, when it was closed along with the Glen Huntly station under the same project.

To accommodate the differing voltages of the 600-volt tram and 1500-volt train systems each of these level crossings is fitted with an overhead square, which can isolate the section of overhead wiring above the crossing and apply the appropriate voltage. When the signal box adjacent to the crossing interlocks the gates for trains to pass through, 1500 volts is applied, while when the gates are up 600 volts is applied.

Historically many tram–train level crossings have operated in Melbourne, all but the aforementioned two have been grade-separated, or the tramway or railway has been abandoned. The first were built during the cable tram systems operation, with much reluctance on behalf of the Victorian Railways. Many more were built after the emergence of electric trams in 1906, often causing disputes between tramway operators and the Victorian Railways.

== In popular culture ==
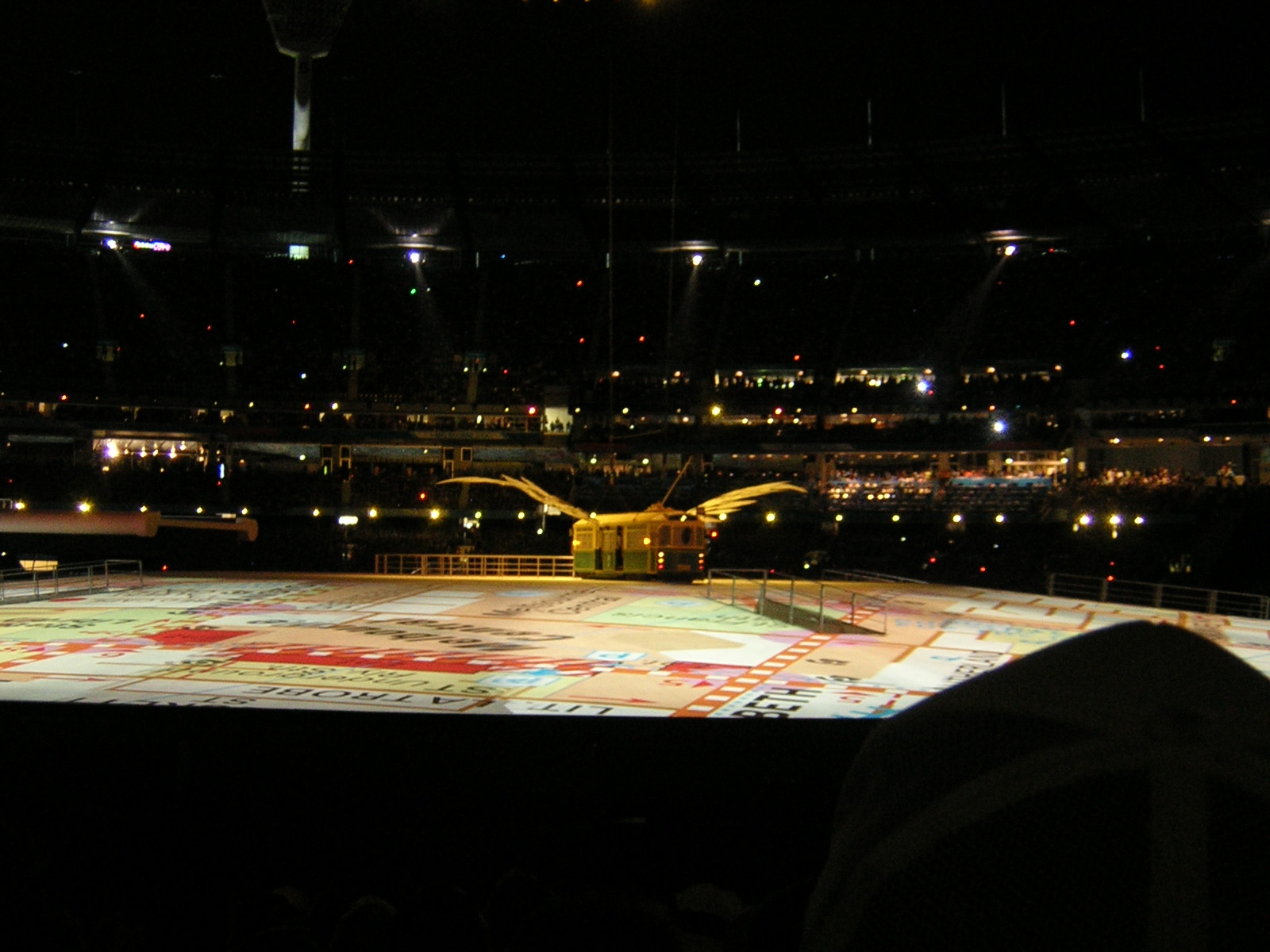
The "flying tram" featured in the 2006 Commonwealth Games opening ceremony, sitting on a Melbourne street map

=== Media and sporting events ===
Melbourne's trams—especially the W class—are an icon of Melbourne and an important part of its history and character. Trams have been featured across several media, and in tourism advertising since World War II.

The character of Nora in the novel Monkey Grip (1977) by Helen Garner occasionally uses trams to run errands and make daily trips around the city. Trams are heavily featured in the movie Malcolm, one scene of the controversial film Alvin Purple, and feature in the music video clips for the Beastie Boys' The Rat Cage and AC/DC's It's a Long Way to the Top. Among songs written about Melbourne's trams are Toorak Tram by Bernard Bolan, and Taking the tram to Carnegie by the band Oscar.

The Eastern Suburbs Professional Community Theatre Company, known as Theatre Works staged a performance on a route 42 (now route 109) tram entitled Storming Mont Albert by Tram, between 26 February and 14 March 1982 as part of the Melbourne Moomba Festival. It was written by Paul Davies and directed by Mark Shirrefs and was revived in 1992 and 1998.

For the Melbourne 2006 Commonwealth Games a Z1 class tram was decorated as a Karachi bus by a team of Pakistani decorators. Dubbed the Karachi tram, it operated on the City Circle tourist route during the Commonwealth Games. The tram was withdrawn from service in 2007 and is now preserved in the Melbourne Tram Museum at Hawthorn tram depot, being delivered on 19 June 2015. The centrepiece of the Opening Ceremony was a flying W class tram, specially built for the event, from original W class plans and photos.

=== Royal occasions ===
In 2006 a W class tram 965 was gifted from the City of Melbourne to Australian Mary Donaldson and her fiancé, Danish Crown Prince Frederik, on the occasion of their marriage. The tram now runs at the Danish tram museum of Sporvejsmuseet.

On 26 October 2011, a Z3 class tram, specially liveried as a Royal Tram was used to convey Elizabeth II and Prince Philip, Duke of Edinburgh, from Federation Square to Government House, along St Kilda Road during their visit to Melbourne. The Royal Tram was in regular service for a little over one year following the event.

=== Melbourne Art Trams ===
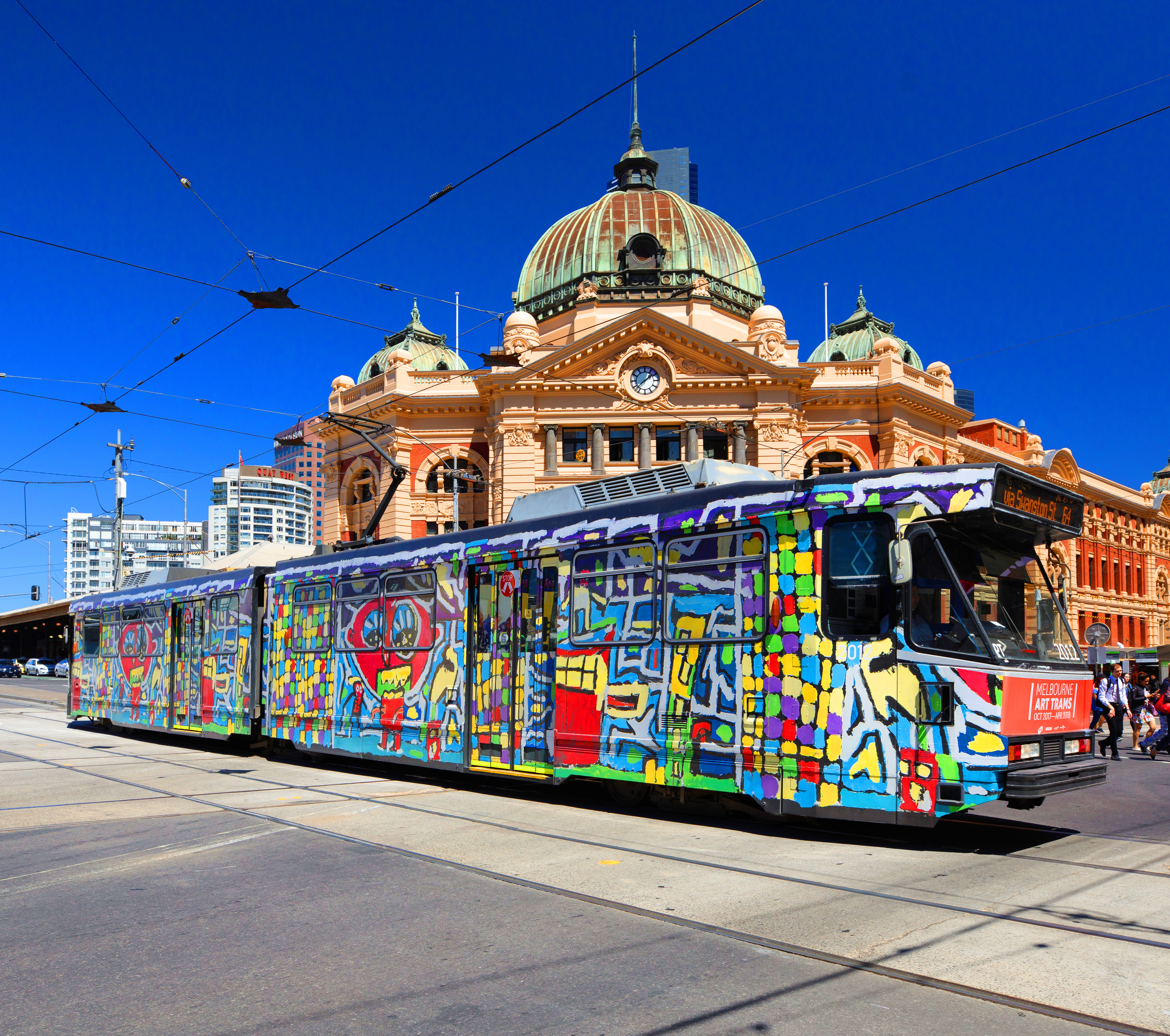
Matthew Clarke's 2017 Melbourne Art Tram

From 1978 to 1993 36 W class trams were painted with artwork as part of the Transporting Art project. The idea was conceived in early 1978 by Melbourne Lord Mayor Irvin Rockman and artist Clifton Pugh, with the idea backed by then Premier Rupert Hamer. Over the lifetime of the project many notable local artists participated, including Mirka Mora, Michael Leunig, Howard Arkley and Reg Mombassa.

The idea was reprised as part of a collaboration between Arts Victoria, Yarra Trams and the Melbourne International Arts Festival in 2013. A competition launched in May 2013 to select eight designs, with one art tram to operate out of each Melbourne tram depot. The first of the new Melbourne Art Trams, W class 925, was launched on 30 September 2013 by then Premier Denis Napthine and Yarra Trams CEO Clément Michel, with the remaining seven trams to be introduced in the following two weeks. The last was introduced into service on 11 October 2013.

Melbourne Art Trams have continued to be refreshed and introduced annually since 2013, with over 48 artists featured. In 2018 the program was extended for a further 3 years through to 2021, and featured the first interactive art tram (using augmented reality) designed by Dr Troy Innocent for Melbourne International Games Week. The trams can be found on the network throughout the year by entering the corresponding tram number in the myTRAM feature of the tramTRACKER app.

== Legislation and governance ==
=== Transport Integration Act 2010 ===
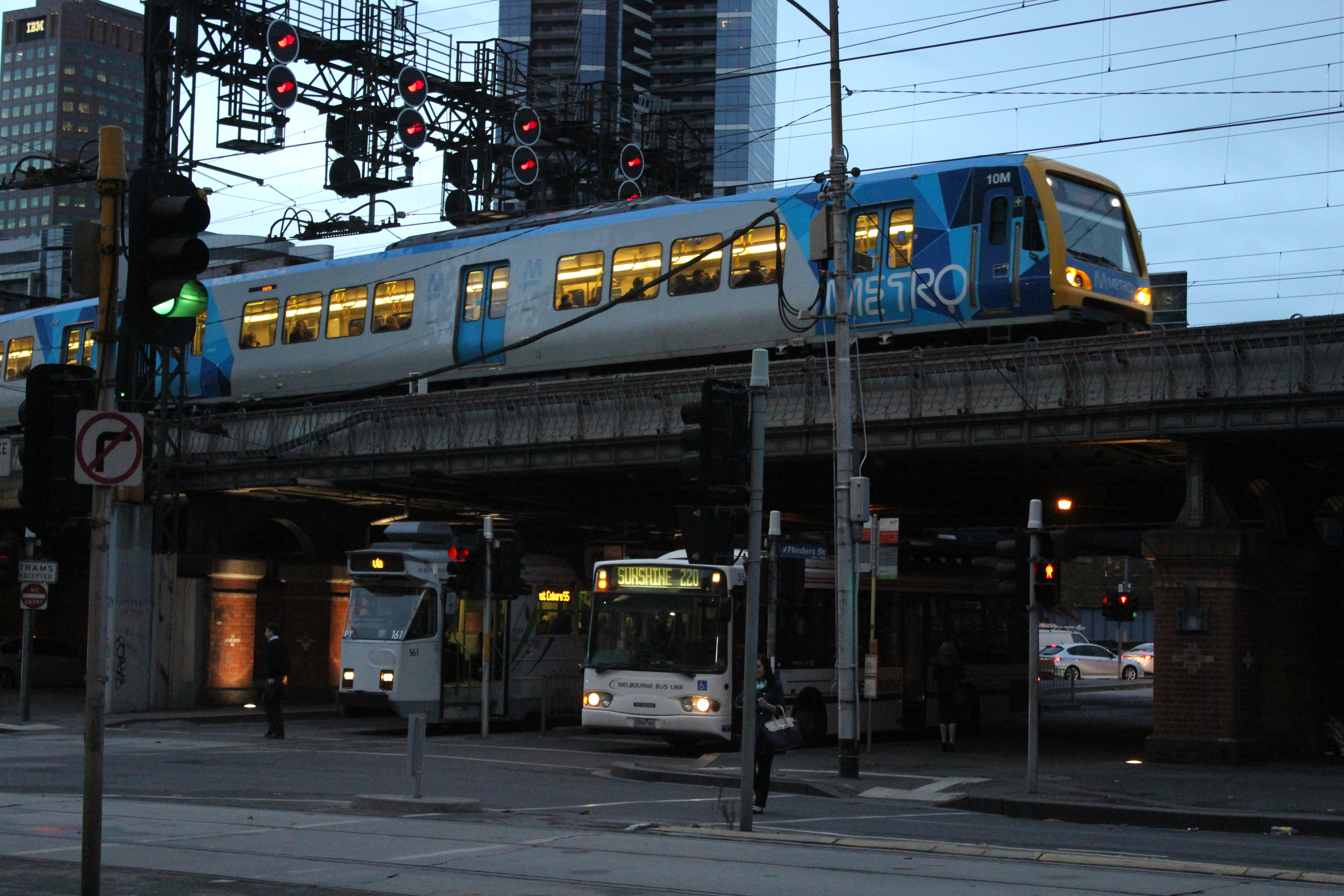
The Transport Integration Act 2010 aims to bring together multiple modes of transport through integrated planning.

The prime rail related statute in Victoria is the Transport Integration Act 2010, the act was enacted to provide an overarching legislation for Victoria's transport system. It requires state agencies charged with providing transport services to work together towards an integrated transport system, and requires state planning bodies to consult the act when making decisions that will affect the transport system.

The act establishes Transport Safety Victoria (TSV) as Victoria's safety regulator for bus, maritime and rail transport. The Act also establishes the independent office of the Director, Transport Safety, though who the regulatory function is carried out with the support of TSV.

Another important piece of legislation is the Rail Management Act 1996, whose purpose is to establish a management regime for Victoria's rail infrastructure.

=== Safety ===
The safety of tram operations in Melbourne is regulated by the Rail Safety Act 2006 which applies to all rail operations in Victoria.

The act establishes a framework containing safety duties for all rail industry participants and requires operators who manage infrastructure and rolling stock to obtain accreditation prior to commencing operations. Accredited operators are also required to have a safety management system to guide their operations. Sanctions applying to the safety scheme established under the Rail Safety Act 2006 are contained in the Part 7 of the Transport (Compliance and Miscellaneous) Act 1983.

The safety regulator for the rail system in Victoria including trams is the Director, Transport Safety, whose office is established under the Transport Integration Act 2010.

Rail operators in Victoria can also be the subject of no blame investigations conducted by the Chief Investigator, Transport Safety. The Chief Investigator is charged by the Transport Integration Act 2010 with conducting investigations into rail safety matters including incidents and trends.

=== Ticketing and conduct ===
Ticketing requirements for trams in Melbourne are mainly contained in the Transport (Ticketing) Regulations 2006 and the Victorian Fares and Ticketing Manual.

Rules about safe and fair conduct on trams in Melbourne are generally contained in the Transport (Compliance and Miscellaneous) Act 1983, and the Transport (Conduct) Regulations 2005.

== See also ==
- List of tram and light-rail transit systems
- Proposed Melbourne tram extensions
- Transport in Australia
