= Melbourne tram route 79 =

Route 79
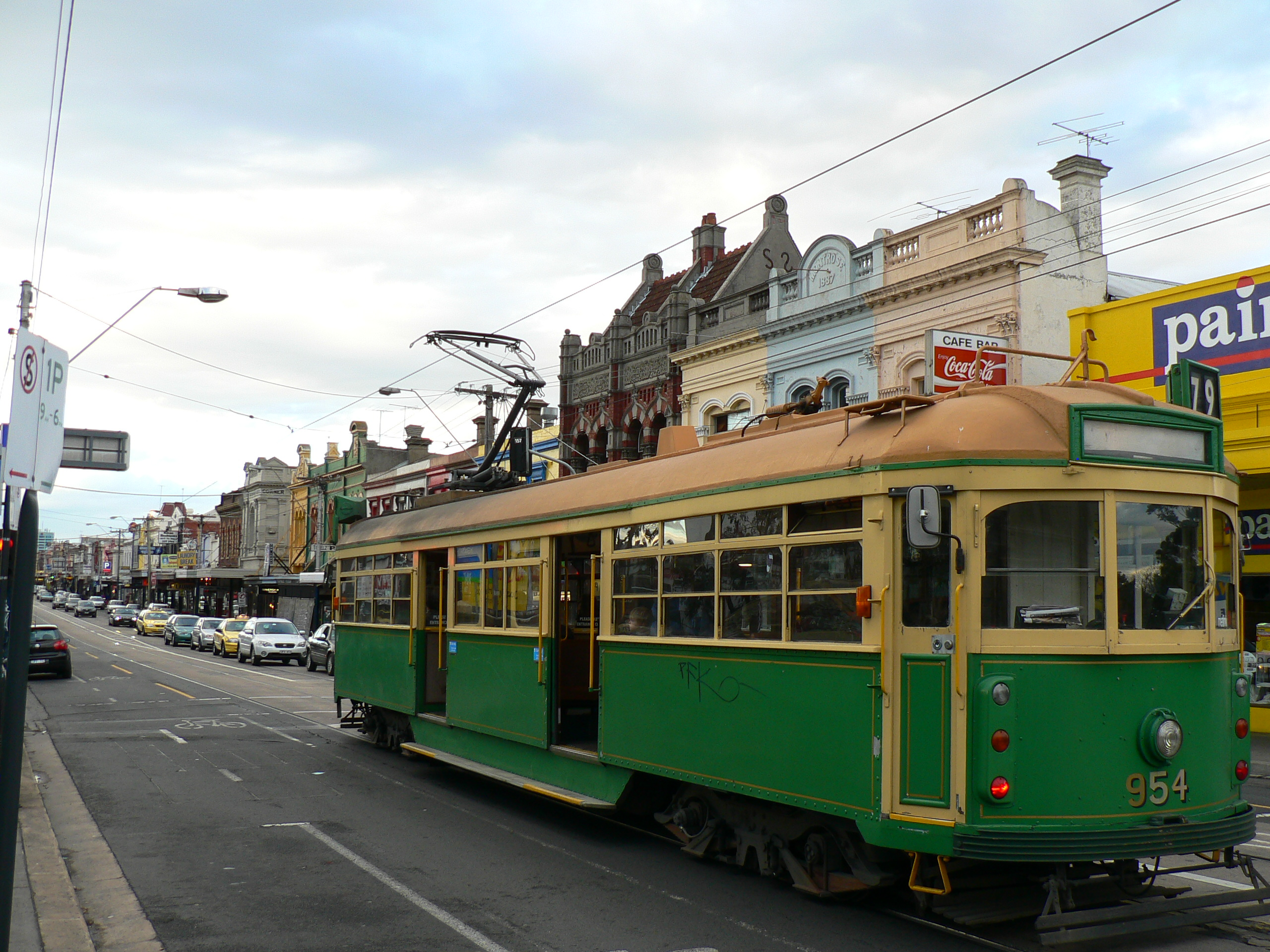
- W954 on Chapel Street at Windsor station in September 2006

Overview
- System: Melbourne tramway network
- Operator: Yarra Trams
- Depot: Glenhuntly
- Vehicle: Z class A class
- Ended service: 27 July 2014

Route
- Start: North Richmond
- Via: Richmond; South Yarra; Windsor; Prahran
- End: St Kilda Beach
- Length: 7.5 kilometres
- Timetable: Route 79 timetable
- Map: Route 79 map

Melbourne tram route 79 was operated by Yarra Trams on the Melbourne tram network from North Richmond to St Kilda Beach. The 7.5 kilometre route was operated out of Glenhuntly depot with Z and A class trams.

Operated after 19:00 as an extended version of route 78, it was one of the few Melbourne tram routes that did not pass through the CBD.

== History ==
On 14 February 1965, operation of route 79 was transferred from Hawthorn depot to Kew depot. From 30 April 1972, it was jointly operated by Glenhuntly and Kew depots. On 30 September 1991, Z class trams began operating on the route. From 2 April 1995, it was solely operated by Glenhuntly.

Before 20 July 2009, route 79 North Richmond to St Kilda Beach operated Monday to Friday from 18:15, Saturdays from 13:10, and all day Sundays and public holidays. It was then altered to operate after 19:00 each night. The route was discontinued on 27 July 2014 and replaced by a full-time route 78 service.
