= A class Melbourne tram =

Class of bogie tram operated in Melbourne, Australia

A class
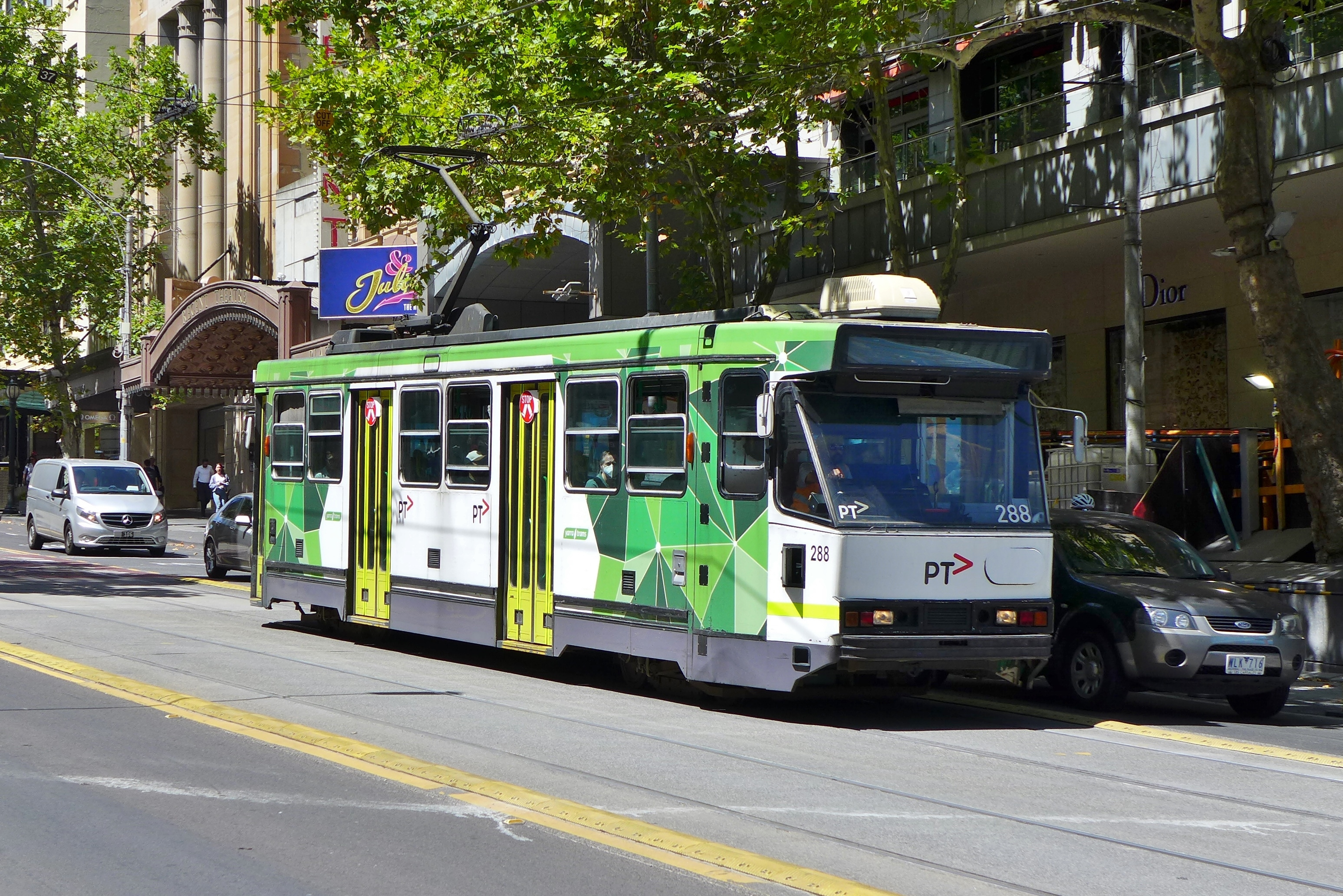
- A2 288 on Collins Street, February 2023

- Refurbished interior
- Manufacturer: Comeng
- Assembly: Dandenong
- Replaced: All remaining W2 and SW2 class trams
- Constructed: 1983–1987
- Number built: 70
- Number in service: 69
- Fleet numbers: A1 231–A1 258; A2 259–A2 300
- Capacity: 40/65 (seated/standing)
- Depots: Camberwell; East Preston; Kew; Southbank

Specifications
- Train length: 15.01 m (49 ft 3 in)
- Width: 2.67 m (8 ft 9 in)
- Height: 3.34 m (10 ft 11 in)
- Doors: 6
- Wheel diameter: 660 mm (26 in)
- Wheelbase: 1.8 m (5 ft 11 in)
- Weight: 22.2 t (21.8 long tons; 24.5 short tons)
- Traction system: AEG/Siemens chopper control
- Traction motors: 2 × AEG ABS 3322 195 kW (261 hp)
- Power output: 390 kW (520 hp)
- Acceleration: 1.5 m/s^{2} (3.36 mph/s) (A1); 1.35 m/s^{2} (3.02 mph/s) (A2)
- Deceleration: 1.6 m/s^{2} (3.58 mph/s) (Dynamic braking); 1.4 m/s^{2} (3.13 mph/s) (Mechanical braking); 3 m/s^{2} (6.71 mph/s) (Emergency)
- Electric systems: 600 V DC (nominal) from overhead catenary
- Current collection: Pantograph
- UIC classification: B′B′
- Bogies: Duewag tandem-drive
- Track gauge: 1,435 mm (4 ft 8 1/2 in) standard gauge

The A class Melbourne tram is a class of bogie trams that operate on the Melbourne tram network. Seventy were built by Comeng, Dandenong between 1984 and 1987 in two batches, 28 A1s and 42 A2s, with only minor differences. They are the smallest trams by capacity currently operating on the network.

== History ==
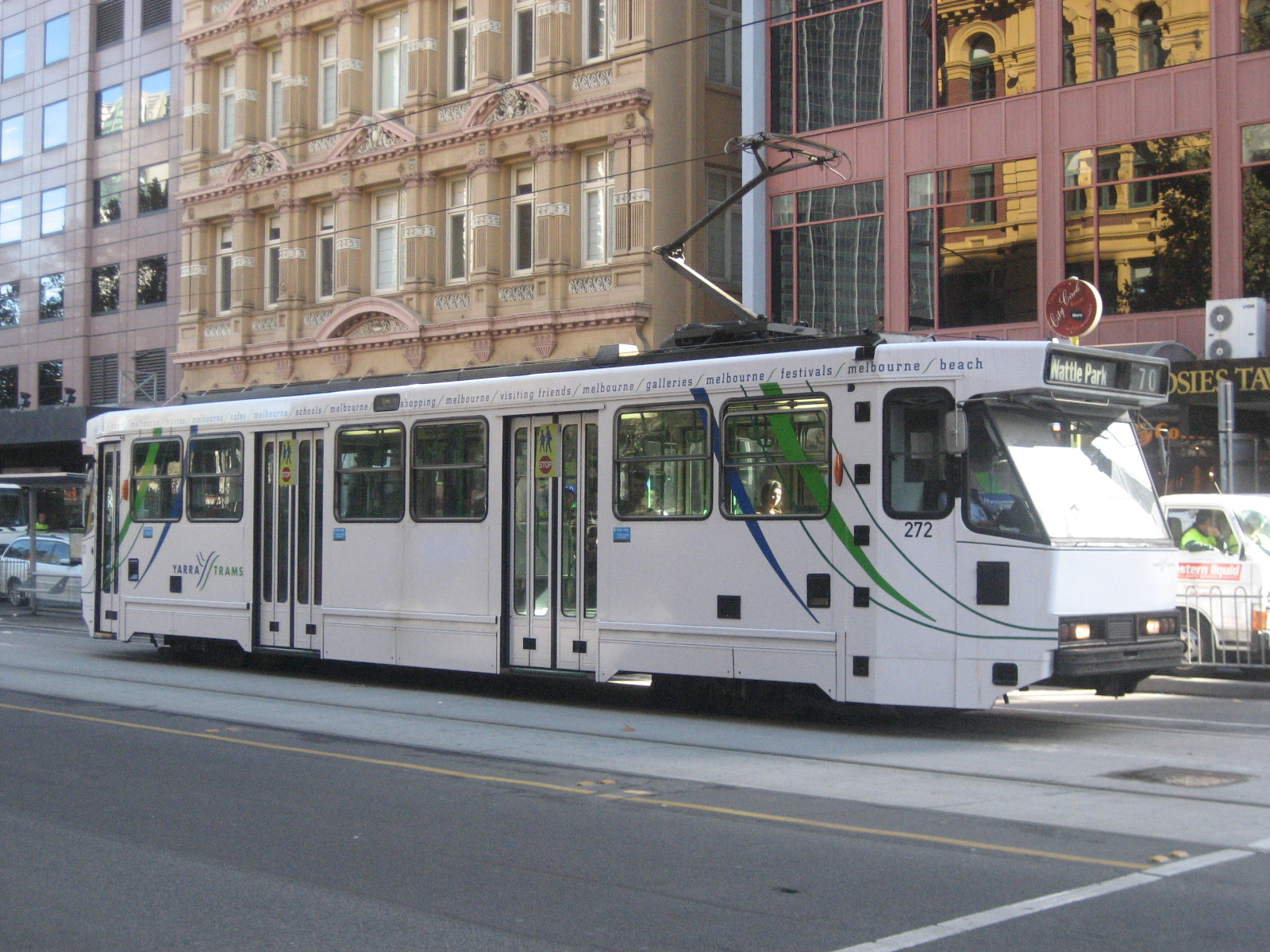
A2 272 on Flinders Street, May 2007

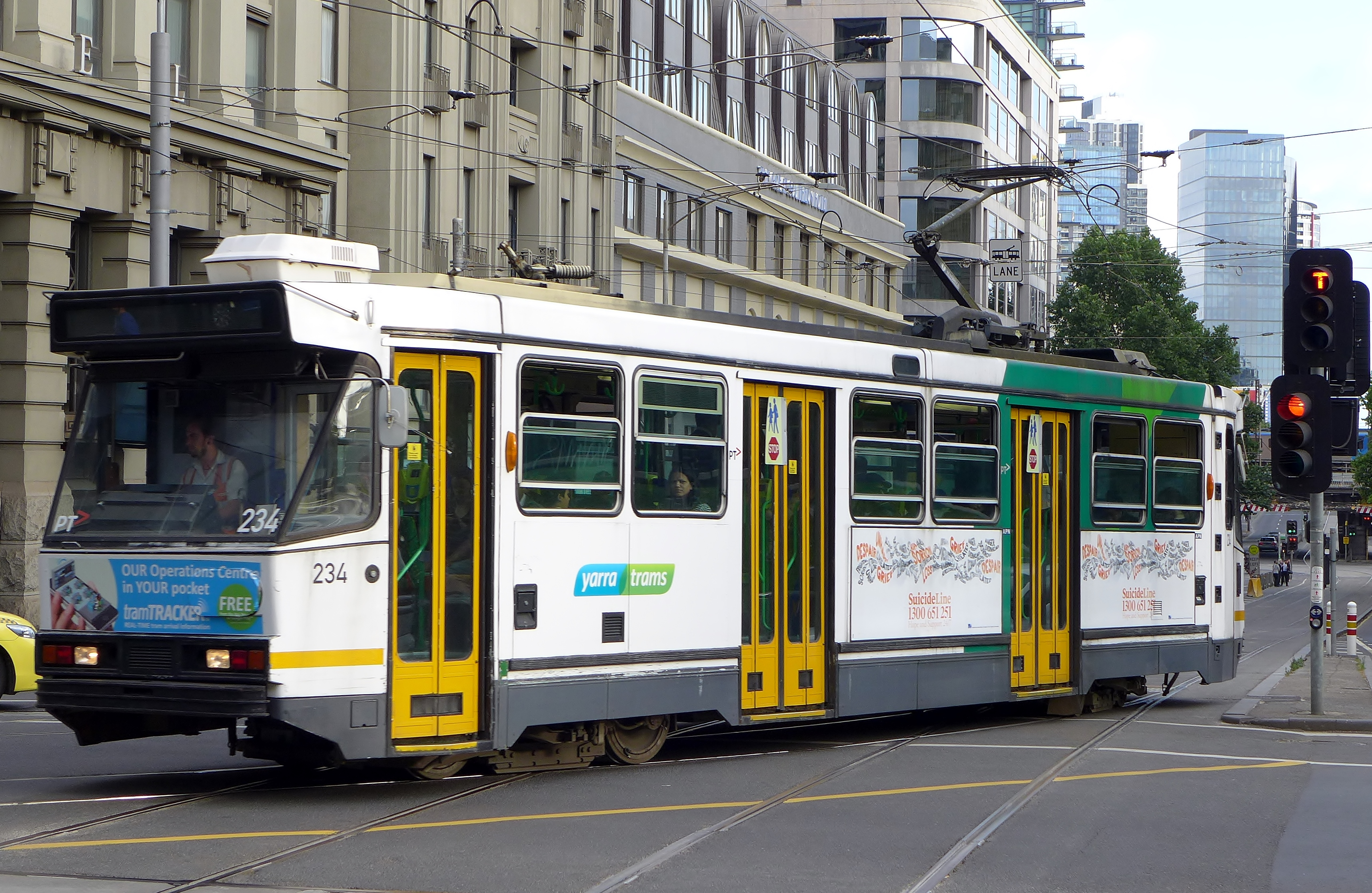
A1 234 in Yarra Trams livery, December 2014

Comeng had expected an extension to the Z class order, and in the early 1980s drew up plans for a Z4 class. Due to a change in state government in 1982, these plans were put on hold. The order eventuated however in late 1982, for 28 A1 class trams. At the same time, an order was placed for two B1 class articulated trams, making a total of 30 trams ordered. The design, which was shaped by input from passengers and tramway employees, had a series of alterations from the Z class design. They did not include the conductors console seen in the Z class and had a differing door arrangement. This posed a design challenge as there was less space to house equipment.

At the end of the 1982/83 financial year the Victorian Government arranged a sale-and-lease-back deal covering 50x Z1, 24x Z3 and 13x A1 class trams along with the automatic vehicle monitoring system used across the network. The sale was for A$507,000,000.

The A1 class order was extended in 1985 by 42, but these were designated A2 due to a number of design changes, including a different door-operating mechanism. All 70 A1 and A2 class trams were built by Comeng's Dandenong factory, with 69 remaining in service. When the Melbourne tram network was privatised in August 1999, all passed to Yarra Trams.

Some trams had their rollsigns replaced with dot matrix equipment in 2005/06, before all were fitted with LED equipment in 2007. All were fitted with air-conditioning in the driver's cab in 2007.

In 2017, an automated on-board passenger information system was installed.

== Subclasses ==
=== A1 class ===
In late 1982, the state government approved an extension to the Z class order, the result being 28 A1 class which were built between 1983 and 1985. They were substantially based upon the Z class design, with improved ventilation, and differing door positions. They had the same equipment as the Z3 class trams, AEG controls and Duewag bogies. However, placing all the Z3 class equipment under the frame posed a problem due to the differing door arrangement, as there were two step-wells where previously there was one, reducing the available space. Due to a desire to be less pointy and possess a flatter front, they were made shorter with less overhang, giving them a different appearance to the Z class trams. The first A1 class was delivered on 12 December 1983 and entered service on 13 June 1984.

All were built with trolley poles, most being replaced with pantographs in 1987/88; six pole-equipped cars (231 to 236) were retaining for Chapel Street services, not being fitted with pantographs until the late-1990s.

In conjunction with celebrations for the 75th Anniversary of Kew Depot (which at the time was allocated all 70 of the A1 and A2 class trams) number 231 was painted in a 'chocolate-and-cream' livery in 1995, and displayed the monograms of some former Melbourne tram operators. It remained in this livery for a number of years afterwards.

As of August 2020, 27 remain in service, one (A1 231) having been withdrawn after being damaged by fire in June 2013.

=== A2 class ===
Following an extension to the A1 class order, 42 A2 class were built between 1985 and 1987. Many initially carried promotional advertising which indicated that the Commonwealth Government contributed towards their construction through the BiCentennial program. They were very similar to the A1 class, however they differ in being fitted with superior Hanning & Kahl brakes, and a more reliable door mechanism. They were the first Melbourne trams to enter service fitted with pantographs and without trolley poles. For use on the light-rail lines, A2 296 was fitted with high-beam headlights (similar to the B2 class) whilst retaining its A1/B1/A2 fibreglass apron. It was the only non-articulated tram so treated, although a small number of A1 and/or A2 class trams received B2 class aprons following repairs (without the extra high-beam headlights).

== Early operation ==
Initially, these trams entered service at Kew Depot, however when the light-rail lines to St. Kilda and Port Melbourne opened in late 1987 a number of A2 class were allocated to South Melbourne and North Fitzroy Depots for these services. As the B2 class became available from late-1988, A2 class trams were returned one-by-one to Kew Depot where they remained throughout the 1990s. Both subclasses were used on routes 42 [Mont Albert - City], 48 [North Balwyn - Spencer St], and their respective peak-hour services to LaTrobe Street (routes 23 and 24), as well as other regular short-workings (e.g. Collins St or LaTrobe St shuttles, etc.).

For the Chapel Street services on routes 78 and 79 (North Richmond - Prahran, and North Richmond - St. Kilda Beach, both shared with Glenhuntly Depot) and Glenferrie Road school runs, only pole-equipped A1 class could be used until the late 1990s. Subsequent to the extension of the Mont Albert service to Port Melbourne as route 109, the A1 class were fitted with pantographs at the number '2' end (retaining the trolley pole at the other end): unusually, these conversions were done in (reverse) sequence from 300 to 237. A1 class 231 to 236 and a few SW6 class trams were kept at Kew Depot for use on the Chapel Street lines (although not exclusively, and could be seen on other routes); these were supplemented by a Z3 class tram in the late 1990s.

When route 78/79 overhead was converted to allow pantograph operation, these last six A1 class cars were also converted. As the C1 class entered service at Kew Depot in 2001 and 2002, displaced A1 and A2 class trams were re-allocated to Camberwell, Glenhuntly, Preston and Southbank Depots. Although trolley poles on the converted A1 class proved useful when pantographs became damaged in service, they were later removed by Yarra Trams.

== Current operation ==
A class trams operate on the following routes:

- 12: St Kilda Fitzroy St to Victoria Gardens
- 30: St Vincent's Plaza to Central Pier Docklands
- 48: North Balwyn to Victoria Harbour Docklands
- 70: Wattle Park to Waterfront City Docklands
- 75: Vermont South to Central Pier Docklands
- 78: North Richmond to Balaclava
- 109: Box Hill to Port Melbourne

A class trams operated on the following routes prior to their abolition:

- 24: City to North Balwyn
- 31: Hoddle Street to Victoria Harbour Docklands
- 79: North Richmond to St Kilda Beach
- 95: Melbourne Museum to City
- 112: West Preston to St Kilda Fitzroy St
