= Melbourne tram route 78 =

Tram route in metropolitan Melbourne, Victoria, Australia

Route 78

- A class tram on Church Street, Richmond, 2018

Overview
- System: Melbourne
- Operator: Yarra Trams
- Depot: Kew
- Vehicle: A class

Route
- Start: North Richmond
- Via: Richmond; South Yarra; Prahran; Windsor
- End: Balaclava
- Length: 6.5 kilometres
- Timetable: Route 78 timetable
- Map: Route 78 map

Melbourne tram route 78 is operated by Yarra Trams on the Melbourne tram network from North Richmond to Balaclava. The 6.5 kilometre route is operated out of Kew depot with A class trams.

== History ==
A section of Chapel Street was first served by a cable tram line opened in 1888, which ran from Brighton Road to Toorak Road, then turned towards St Kilda Road and into the CBD. Between 1924 and 1926 the cable tram line was converted to electric traction by the Melbourne & Metropolitan Tramways Board, and was extended along Church Street, forming the route as it operates today. It ran with two variations: route 79, turning from Chapel Street along Carlisle Street to St Kilda Beach, and route 77, which turned from the southern part of the route at Swan Street and continued into the city. The latter route was discontinued in November 1986.

On 14 February 1965 operation of route 78 was transferred from Hawthorn depot to Kew depot. From 30 April 1972 it was jointly operated by Glenhuntly and Kew depots. From 2 April 1995, it was solely operated by Glenhuntly. In the late 20th century, the line ran predominantly as route 79. Like nearly all tram lines in Melbourne, it was served by W class trams. In the 1990s with the gradual withdrawal of the W-class, the route was operated by Z and A class trams. W class trams were re-introduced in July 2004, after they received brake upgrades. It was one of only three routes running the old trams, the others being route 30 and the City Circle tram. In 2014 the Ws were withdrawn and replaced by Z and A class trams. On 27 July 2014, the route 79 variation was discontinued.

The route was transferred back to Kew Depot on 30 April 2017. This was so there was more room for the larger B-class trams that were to be transferred to Glenhuntly.

Melbourne tram route 78 evolution
| Dates | Route | Notes |
|---|---|---|
| 9 December 1934 - present | North Richmond to Prahran | Prahran later renamed Balaclava terminus; Until 2009, only ran on Mon-Fri until 18:00 & 13:00 on Saturdays. Between 2009-2014, services ran until 18:00 7 days a week |

== Route ==
Interactive map of Melbourne tram route 78.

The route starts at the Victoria Street terminus then runs along Church Street, Richmond, crossing Bridge Road and Swan Street. It continues over the Yarra River into the suburb of South Yarra along Chapel Street, crossing Toorak Road. Continuing down Chapel Street, it terminates at Brighton Road, Balaclava. It is one of only two tram routes which does not travel through the Melbourne CBD, the other being route 82.
