= Melbourne tram route 24 =

Route 24
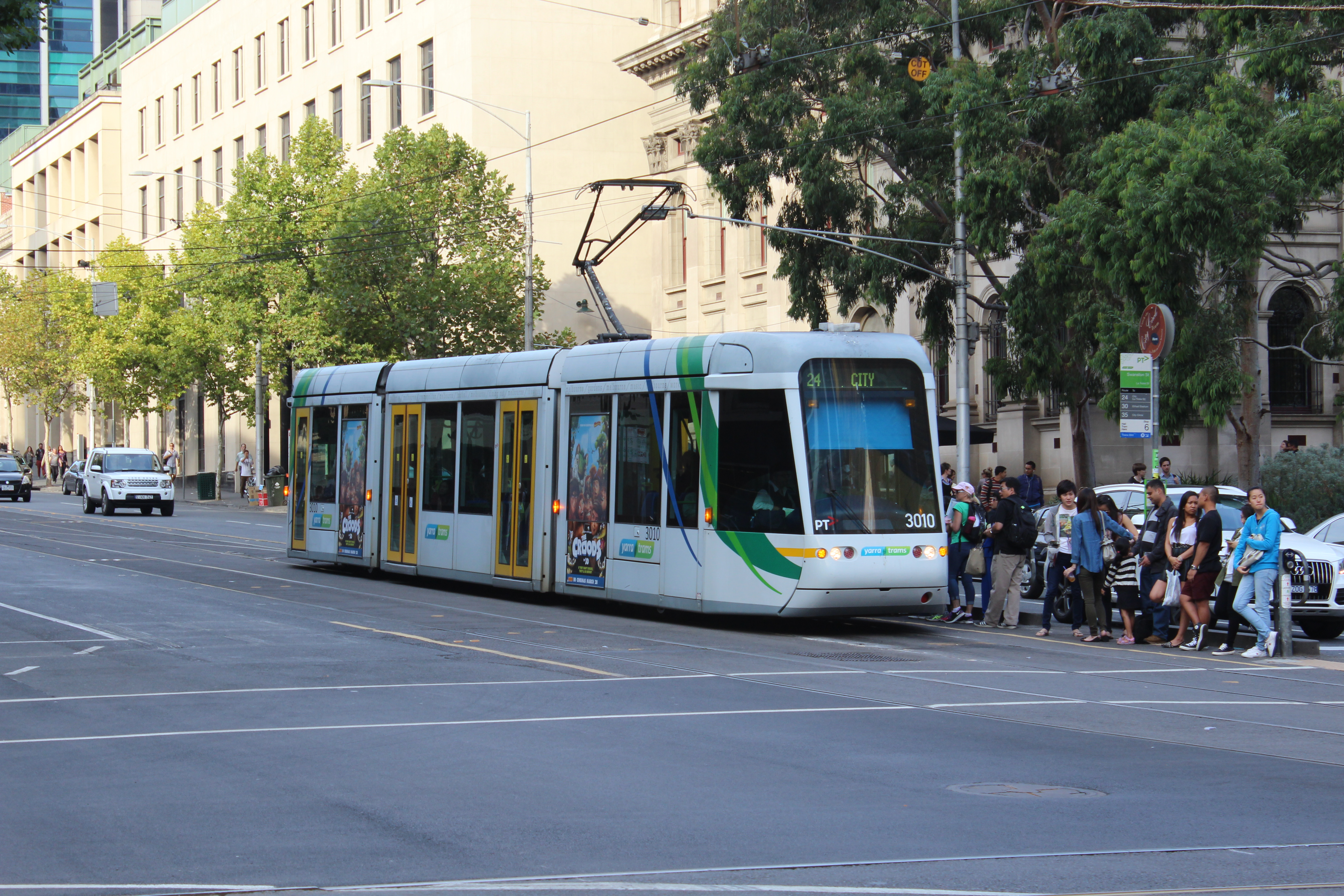
- C.3010 tram on La Trobe Street in 2013

Overview
- System: Melbourne tramway network
- Operator: Yarra Trams
- Depot: Kew
- Vehicle: A class C class
- Began service: 25 September 1972
- Ended service: 26 July 2014
- Predecessors: Route 48

Route
- Locale: Melbourne, Australia
- Start: Balwyn North
- Via: Kew East; Kew; Hawthorn; Richmond; East Melbourne; Melbourne CBD (La Trobe St)
- End: La Trobe Street West End
- Length: 12.6 km (7.8 mi)

Service
- Journey time: 50 minutes
- Operates: Peak hour only
- Zone: Myki Zone 1
- Timetable: Route 24 timetable
- Map: Route 24 map

Melbourne tram route 24 was operated by Yarra Trams on the Melbourne tram network. It operated from Balwyn North to La Trobe Street West End in the Melbourne CBD. The 12.6 kilometre route was operated by A and C class trams from Kew depot.

Route 24 began operating on 25 September 1972 as a peak hour derivative of route 48. Between 23 May and 18 November 2005 it was extended via Docklands to Flinders Street West while the King Street Overpass was demolished.

The route was discontinued on 26 July 2014 as part of a wider timetable change to the Yarra Trams network. It only operated in peak hours.
