= CBD loop =

CBD loop may refer to:

- City Circle - in Sydney, Australia
- City Circle tram - in Melbourne, Australia
- City Loop - in Melbourne, Australia
- Perth Central Area Transit - in Perth, Australia
