= Karachi to Melbourne Tram =

Tram service

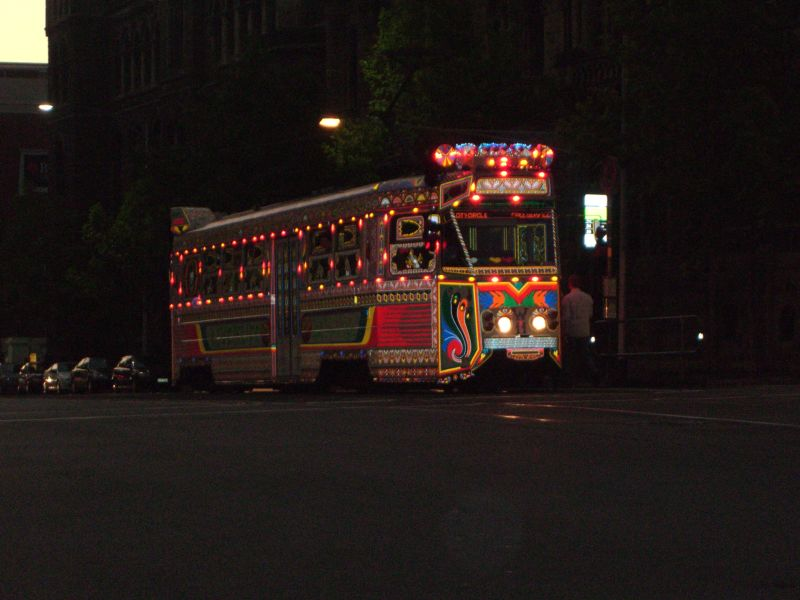
The Karachi Tram by night

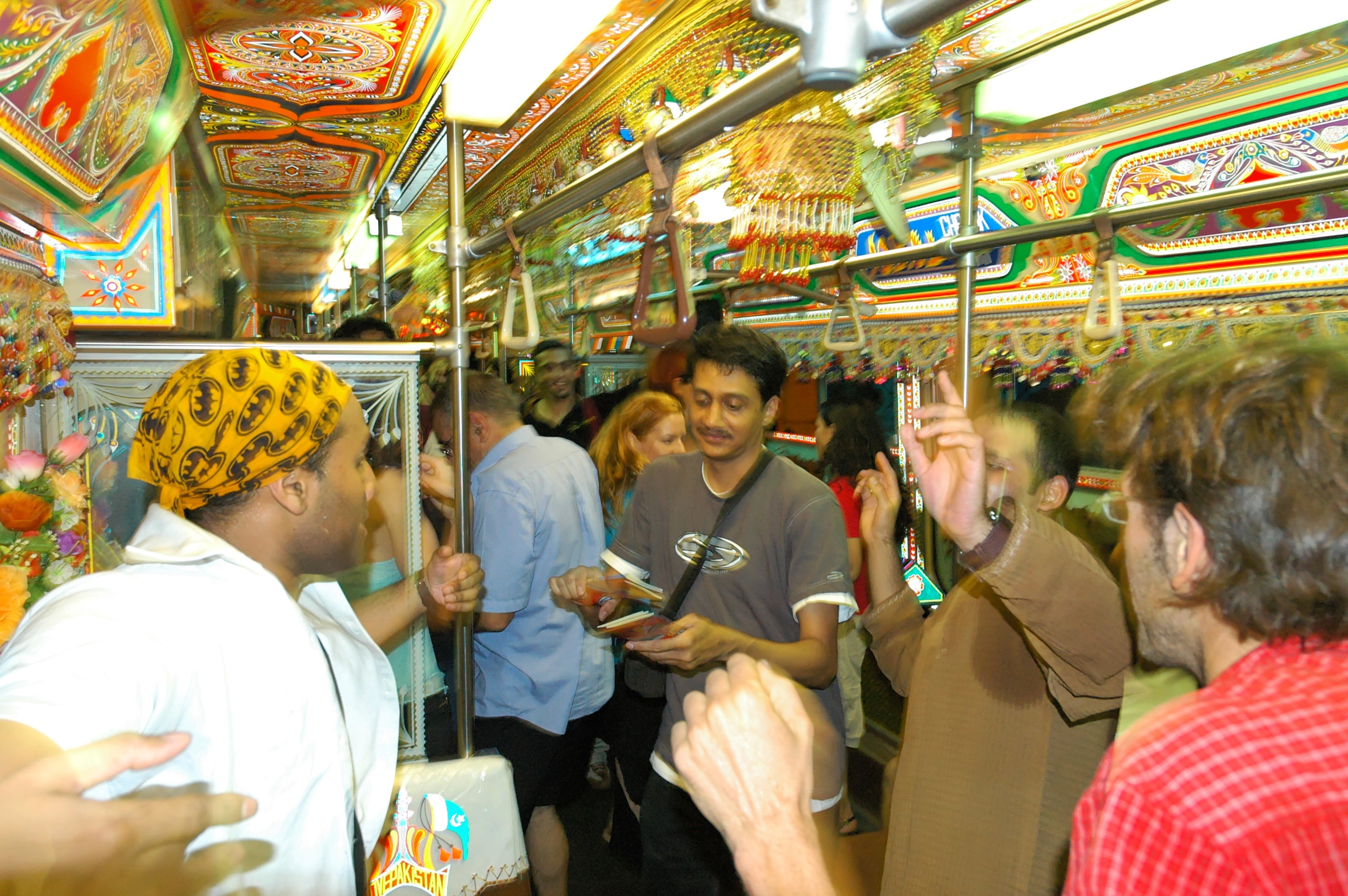
Inside the tram

The Karachi to Melbourne tram or the W-11 tram is a retired Z class tram Z1 81 decorated by a team of professional Pakistani vehicle decorators, commissioned by the City of Melbourne for the 2006 Commonwealth Games.

== Origin of the name ==
The name is based on the W-11 buses originally found in Karachi, Pakistan, which are a model of minibus famous for their entertainment value: decorated with lush designs and playing popular Pakistani or Indian music. Competition between buses has made these buses famous for their extravagant designs and entertainment.

== The tram ==
As a showcase of Pakistani culture, Z class tram Z1 81 was commissioned for the Commonwealth Games, and a team of W-11 decorators were invited to decorate the tram at Preston Workshops. For the duration of the games it operated on the City Circle, playing Bhangra and Pakistani music. It returned to service in the summer of 2006/07 operating Friday night City Circle services.

It is currently on permanent display at the Melbourne Tram Museum at Hawthorn depot since June 2015.
