= Melbourne tram route 64 =

Tram route in metropolitan Melbourne, Victoria, Australia

Route 64

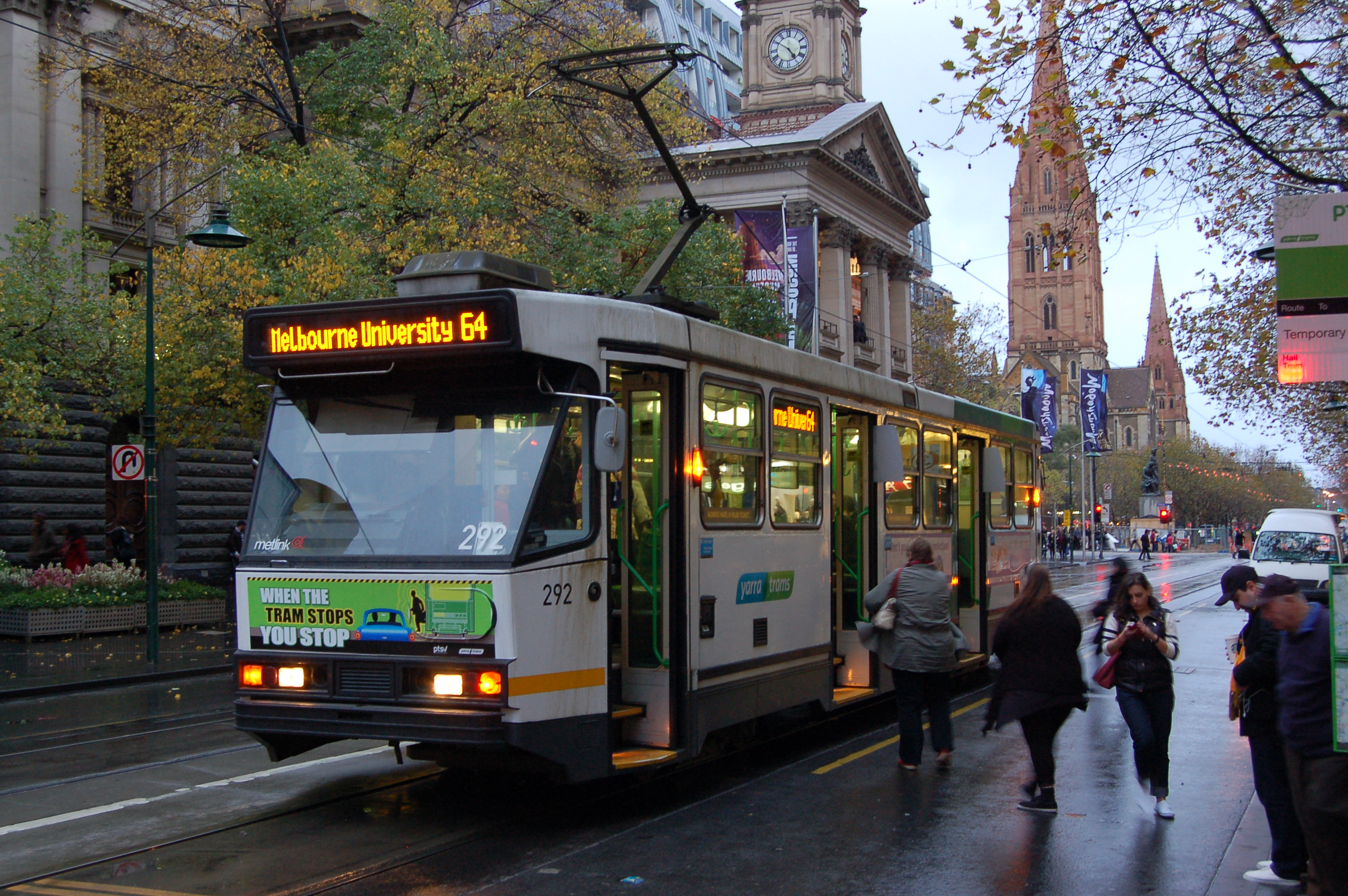
- A Class tram on Swanston Street, May 2012

Overview
- System: Melbourne
- Operator: Yarra Trams
- Depot: Glenhuntly
- Vehicle: Z class B class
- Began service: 16 October 1938

Route
- Start: Melbourne University
- Via: Swanston Street; St Kilda Road; Dandenong Road; Hawthorn Road
- End: East Brighton
- Length: 16.1 kilometres
- Timetable: Route 64 timetable
- Map: Route 64 map

Melbourne tram route 64 is operated by Yarra Trams on the Melbourne tram network from Melbourne University to East Brighton. The 18.1 kilometre route is operated out of Glenhuntly depot with Z and B class trams.

Until 29 October 2023, after 7:00pm, passengers for route 5 to Malvern were required to board route 64 (marked 64/5) and transfer to route 5 shuttles on Dandenong Road. Since 30 October 2023, after 6:30pm, route 64 runs as a shuttle between Dandenong Road and East Brighton, and passengers for route 64 to East Brighton are required to board route 5 and transfer to route 64.

Tram 64's terminus at Nepean Highway in East Brighton is recognised by the Guinness Book of World Records as the world's southernmost tram stop.

== History ==
Route 64 was allocated to the line between East Brighton and City (Swanston Street) on 16 October 1938. Prior to that, Route 64 was allocated to the line between Brighton East and St Kilda Beach via St Kilda Junction. Between 1938 and 9 July 1955, Route 64 ran via Balaclava Road rather than Dandenong Road. Trams traditionally terminated at the Victoria Street terminus, but following an accident in 1991, trams instead terminated at the Queensberry Street crossover. Due to congestion during peak hours at the crossover, some trams continued north to Melbourne University. Finally on 17 January 1996, a permanent shunt was built at Melbourne University. From then on, Route 64 trams were altered run full-time to Melbourne University.

The origins of route 5 lie in separate tram lines. The section of track between Queensberry Street (Stop 4) and St Kilda Road (Stop 30) is the oldest section of this route, dating back to the Brighton Road cable tram which opened on 11 October 1888 by the Melbourne Tramway & Omnibus Company. This cable tram line was electrified in stages by the Melbourne & Metropolitan Tramways Board (MMTB). The section between Domain Interchange (Stop 20) and St Kilda Junction (Stop 30) was electrified on 27 December 1925. The section between Queensberry Street and City Road (near Stop 14) was electrified on the same day. The line between City Road and Domain Interchange was electrified on 24 January 1926. The section between St Kilda Junction and Chapel Street (Stop 32) also dates back to the cable era, as the Windsor to St Kilda Esplanade cable tramway which opened on 17 October 1891. This section was one of the first cable trams to be converted to electric traction on 27 December 1925.

The Prahran & Malvern Tramways Trust built the section between the Sandringham railway line (near Stop 33) and Hawthorn Road (Stop 48), opening on 16 December 1911. This line was extended to Chapel Street (Stop 32) on 31 March 1912. The line between Hawthorn Road and Balaclava Road (Stop 51) opened on 12 April 1913. This was later extended to Glenhuntly Road (Stop 57) on 13 November 1913. Further extensions of the Hawthorn Road line were built by the MMTB to North Road (on 1 March 1925), and to Point Nepean Road on 5 December 1937.

As part of the St Kilda Junction separation works, the Wellington Street section was abandoned for a new section of track along the newly created Queens Way on 4 November 1968.

Since 30 October 2023, after 6:30pm, route 64 runs as a shuttle between Dandenong Road / Wattletree Road and East Brighton. Passengers will need to take route 5 and change at Dandenong Road / Wattletree Road for route 64.

Melbourne tram route 64 evolution
Dates	Route	Notes
24 June 1934 - 4 December 1937	Brighton Cemetery to St Kilda Beach	via Dandenong Road
5 December 1937 - 15 October 1938	East Brighton to St Kilda Beach	via Dandenong Road
16 October 1938 - 9 July 1955	East Brighton to City (Victoria / Swanston Streets)	via Balaclava Road
10 July 1955 - 14 April 1991	East Brighton to City (Victoria Street)	via Dandenong Road, rerouted to Queens Way 11 April 1968
15 April 1991 - 16 January 1996	East Brighton to City (Queensberry / Swanston Streets)	via Dandenong Road
17 January 1996 - present	East Brighton to Melbourne University	via Dandenong Road

Mid-block stops 39 and 41 on Dandenong Road have been permanently removed due to safety concerns for pedestrians crossing the busy arterial road.

== Operation ==
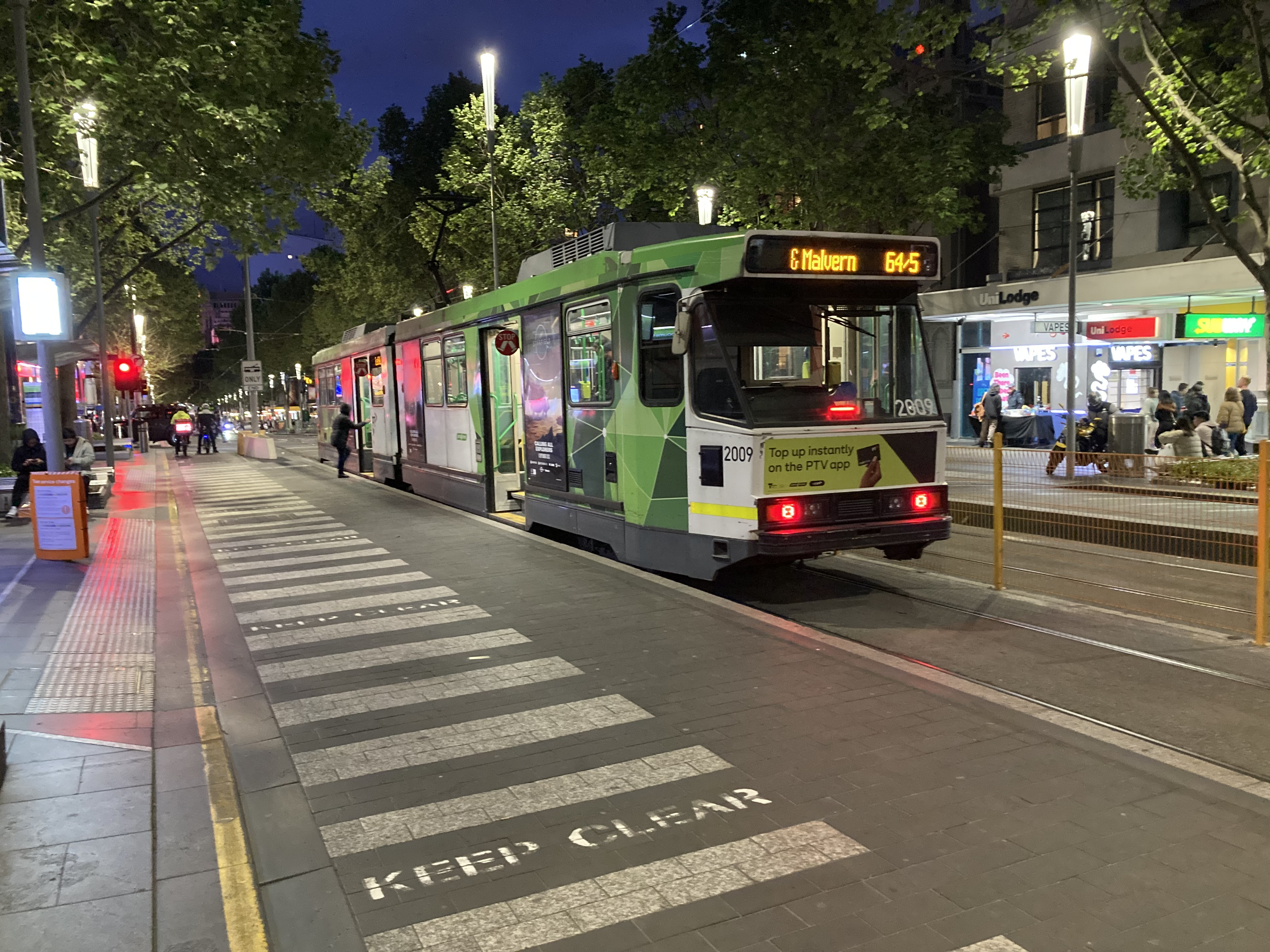
B-class tram on route 64 displaying the 64/5 route number at evening, October 2023

Route 64 is operated out of Glenhuntly depot with Z and B class trams.

Until 29 October 2023, the service displayed the route number 64/5 after 07:00pm, to show that passengers would take the service and connect with route 5 services at Dandenong Road / Wattletree Road.

Since 30 October 2023, from 6:30pm, the service only operates between Dandenong Road / Wattletree Road and East Brighton, with services timetabled to connect with route 5 services.

== Route map ==
Interactive map of Melbourne tram route 64.
