= Melbourne tram route 67 =

Tram route in metropolitan Melbourne, Victoria, Australia

Route 67

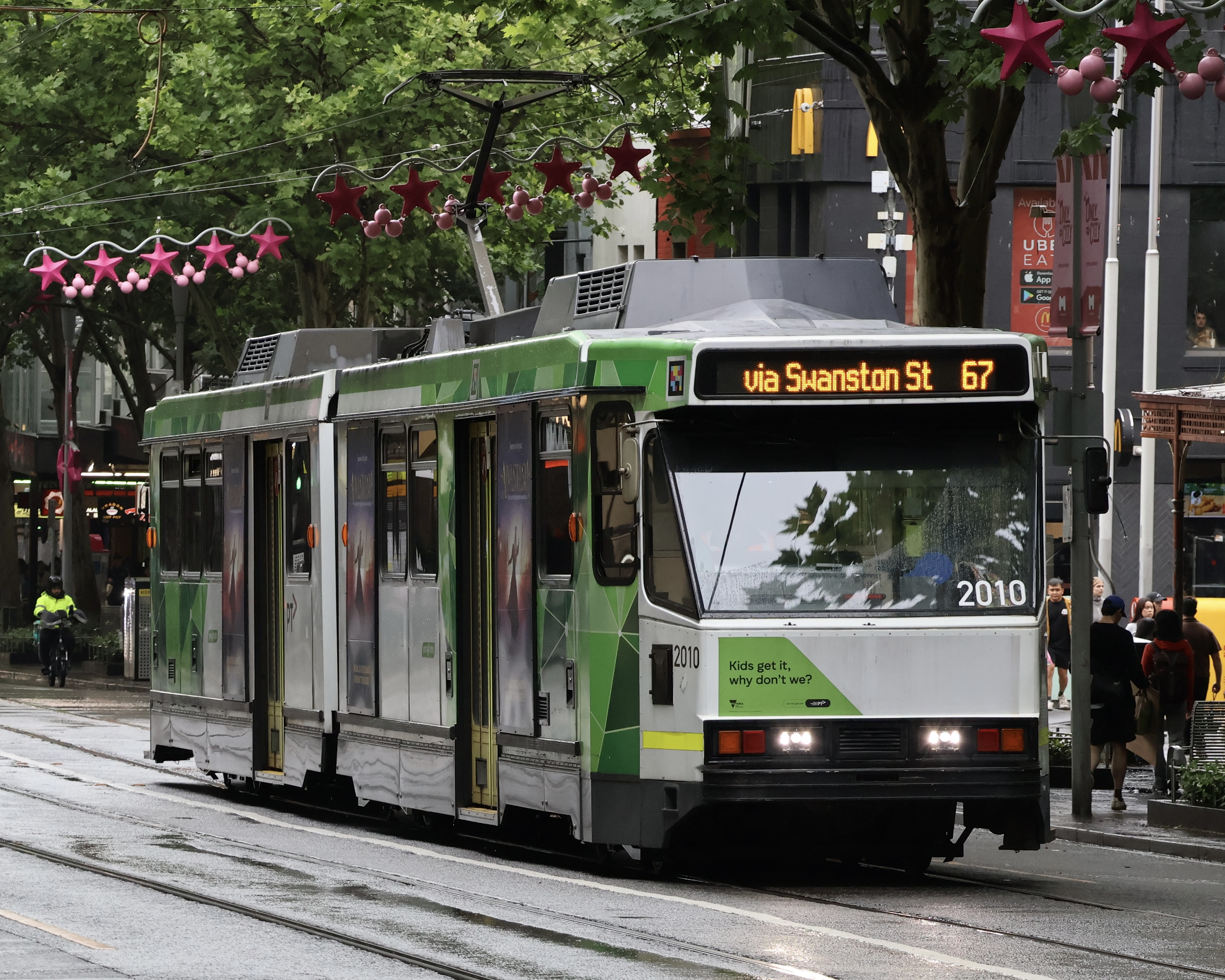
- B class tram on Swanston Street, December 2025

Overview
- System: Melbourne
- Operator: Yarra Trams
- Depot: Glenhuntly
- Vehicle: Z class B class
- Began service: 1 November 1970
- Night-time: Friday & Saturday

Route
- Start: Melbourne University
- Via: Swanston Street; St Kilda Road; Brighton Road; Glen Huntly Road
- End: Carnegie
- Length: 15.5 kilometres
- Timetable: Route 67 timetable
- Map: Route 67 map

Melbourne tram route 67 is operated by Yarra Trams on the Melbourne tram network from Melbourne University to Carnegie. The 15.5-kilometre (9.6 mi) route is operated out of Glenhuntly depot with Z and B class trams.

== History ==
Route 67 was first allocated to the line between Carnegie and the City (Swanston Street) on 1 November 1970, as part of a network-wide renumbering scheme. Prior to that, the line to Carnegie was serviced by route 4. When route numbers were first introduced to Melbourne's tram network, route 67 was allocated to the route between Point Ormond and Elsternwick. A number revision in 1938 led to route 67 being allocated between Balaclava Junction and St Kilda Beach via Dandenong Road and St Kilda Junction. Further changes on 1 August 1955 led to Route 67 becoming a shortworking for West Coburg services terminating in the city (William Street) rather than Domain Road. Trams traditionally terminated at the Victoria Street terminus, but following an accident in 1991, trams instead terminated at the Queensberry Street crossover. Due to congestion during peak hours at the crossover, some trams continued north to Melbourne University. Finally on 17 January 1996, a permanent shunt was built at Melbourne University. From then on, Route 67 trams were altered run full-time to Melbourne University.

The origins of route 67 lie in separate tram lines. The section of track between Queensberry Street (Stop 4) and Brunning Street (Stop 38) is the oldest section of this route, dating back to the Brighton Road cable tram which opened on 11 October 1888 by the Melbourne Tramway & Omnibus Company. This cable tram line was electrified in stages by the Melbourne & Metropolitan Tramways Board (MMTB). The section between Domain Interchange (Stop 20) and St Kilda Junction (Stop 30) was electrified on 27 December 1925. The section between Queensberry Street and City Road (near Stop 14) was electrified on the same day. The line between City Road and Domain Interchange was electrified on 24 January 1926. The Prahran & Malvern Tramways Trust opened the Glen Huntly Road line between Elsternwick (Stop 44) and Grange Road (Stop 62) on 13 November 1913. The MMTB extended this line to Carnegie on 19 December 1926. The section of track between Brunning Street and Glen Huntly Road (Stop 43) opened on 29 August 1926.

In December 1988 work began on duplicating the Truganini Road section of the line at Carnegie, the last single track section on the network. The work was completed in May 1989.

In January 2016, route 67 began operating through the night on Fridays and Saturdays as part of the Night Network.

Melbourne tram route 67 evolution
Dates	Route	Notes
24 June 1934 - 15 October 1938	Point Ormond to Elsternwick	
16 October 1938 - 31 July 1955	Balaclava Junction to St Kilda Beach	via Dandenong Road
1 August 1955 - 31 October 1970	City (William Street) to West Coburg	
1 November 1970 - 14 April 1991	City (Victoria Street) to Carnegie	
15 April 1991 - 16 January 1996	City (Queensberry / Swanston Streets) to Carnegie	Some services terminated at Melbourne University
17 January 1996 – present	Melbourne University to Carnegie	

== Operation ==
Route 67 is operated out of Glenhuntly depot with Z and B class trams.

== Route map ==
Interactive map of Melbourne tram route 67.
