= Glen Huntly tram depot =

Depot in Melbourne, Australia

Coordinates: 37.8862°S 145.0269°E

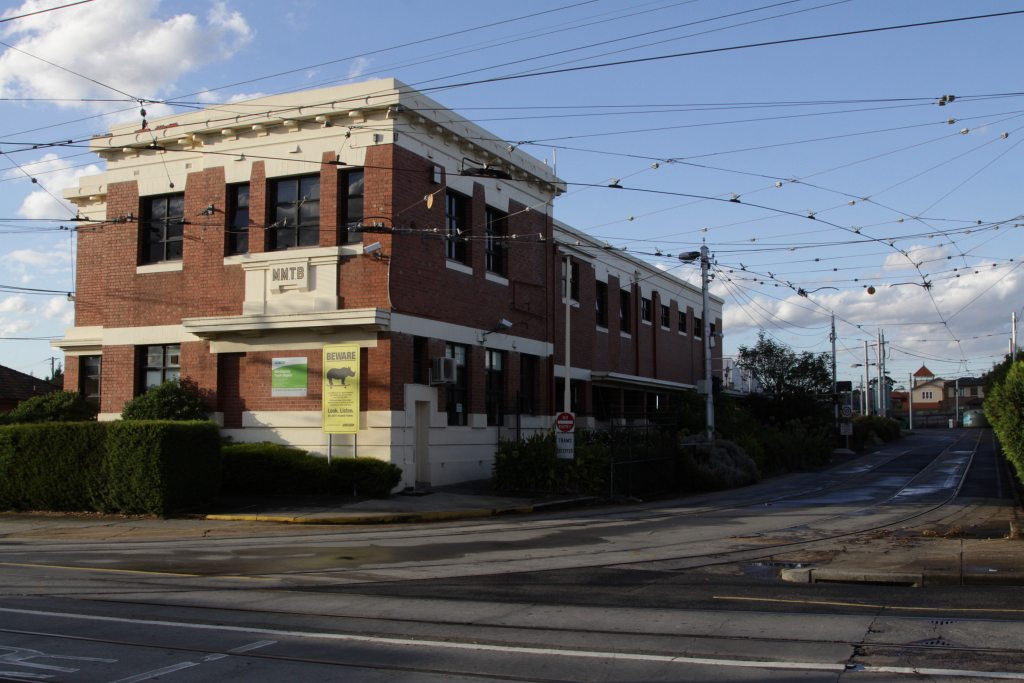
- Main entrance to the depot from Glen Huntly Road, February 2012
- Interactive map of Glen Huntly tram depot

Location
- Location: Caulfield

Characteristics
- Owner: VicTrack
- Operator: Yarra Trams
- Depot code: G
- Roads: 12 (6 in sheds, 6 outside)
- Rolling stock: 41 B2 Class; 9 Z3 Class
- Routes served: 3, 64, 67

History
- Opened: 1923
- Former depot code: GH

Glenhuntly tram depot is located on Glen Huntly Road, Caulfield a suburb in Melbourne, Victoria, Australia. Operated by Yarra Trams, it is one of eight tram depots on the Melbourne tram network.

== History ==
Glenhuntly tram depot opened in 1923 and is one of eight depots on the Yarra Trams network.

When the Public Transport Corporation was privatised in August 1999, Glenhuntly depot passed to M>Tram. It passed to Yarra Trams when it took control of the entire tram network in April 2004.

== Layout ==
The main yard has 12 roads, six of these inside a maintenance shed. A single, double-track entrance exists, one for trams entering the depot and the other for trams leaving the depot.

== Rolling stock ==
As of May 2024, the depot has an allocation of 50 trams: 41 B2 Class and 9 Z3 Class.

== Routes ==
The following routes are operated from Glenhuntly depot:

- : Melbourne University to East Malvern
- : Melbourne University to East Brighton
- : Melbourne University to Carnegie
- Until 30 April 2017, Route 78 was operated out of Glenhuntly depot when it was transferred back to Kew depot to allow more B2 class trams to be operated from here.

== Spelling ==
The name "Glenhuntly tram depot" is commonly used, although the correct spelling of the suburb is "Glen Huntly" (with a space). Yarra Trams has addressed this issue, with stop 53 served by Route 67 being renamed to "Glen Huntly Tram Depot", and publishing a Facebook post in 2024 confirming the renaming of the depot to the correct spelling.

Additionally, the Victorian Heritage Council has the depot labelled "Glen Huntly Tram Depot".
