= Dandenong rolling stock factory =

Train and tram manufacturer in Melbourne

- Built: 1954
- Location: Dandenong South, Melbourne, Victoria, Australia
- Coordinates: 38°00′08″S 145°13′16″E
- Products: Trams, Trains
- Owner: Alstom

The Dandenong rolling stock factory in the Melbourne suburb of Dandenong South was opened in 1954 by Commonwealth Engineering. It has since been operated in succession by ABB, Adtranz, Bombardier and Alstom.

== History ==
The Dandenong rolling stock factory was built by Commonwealth Engineering opening in 1954. In 1990, the plant was sold to ABB. It was included in the 1996 merger of ABB and the Daimler-Benz rail division, as Adtranz, the 2000 takeover of Adtranz by Bombardier, and the 2021 takeover of Bombardier by Alstom.

== Output ==
The lists below are each in order of when each train type was first produced.

=== Trains ===
- 180 Melbourne Comeng EMU sets
- 20 Adelaide 3000 class railcars
- 4 New South Wales XPT power cars and 13 trailers
- 21 New South Wales Xplorer railcars
- 30 New South Wales Endeavour railcars
- 33 Indian Railway WAP-5 electric locomotives
- 222 Market–Frankford Line M-4 subway cars
- 141 V/Line VLocity sets
- 31 Adelaide Metro 4000 class sets

=== Trams ===
- 230 Z class Melbourne trams
- 70 A-class Melbourne trams
- 132 B-class Melbourne trams
- 70 Phase 1 LRV trams for the Hong Kong Light Rail
- 7 Variotrams for the Sydney Light Rail
- 100 E-class Melbourne trams
- 100 G-class Melbourne trams, (number ordered); class currently in production
