= City Circle tram =

Tram route in metropolitan Melbourne, Victoria, Australia

Route 35 (City Circle)

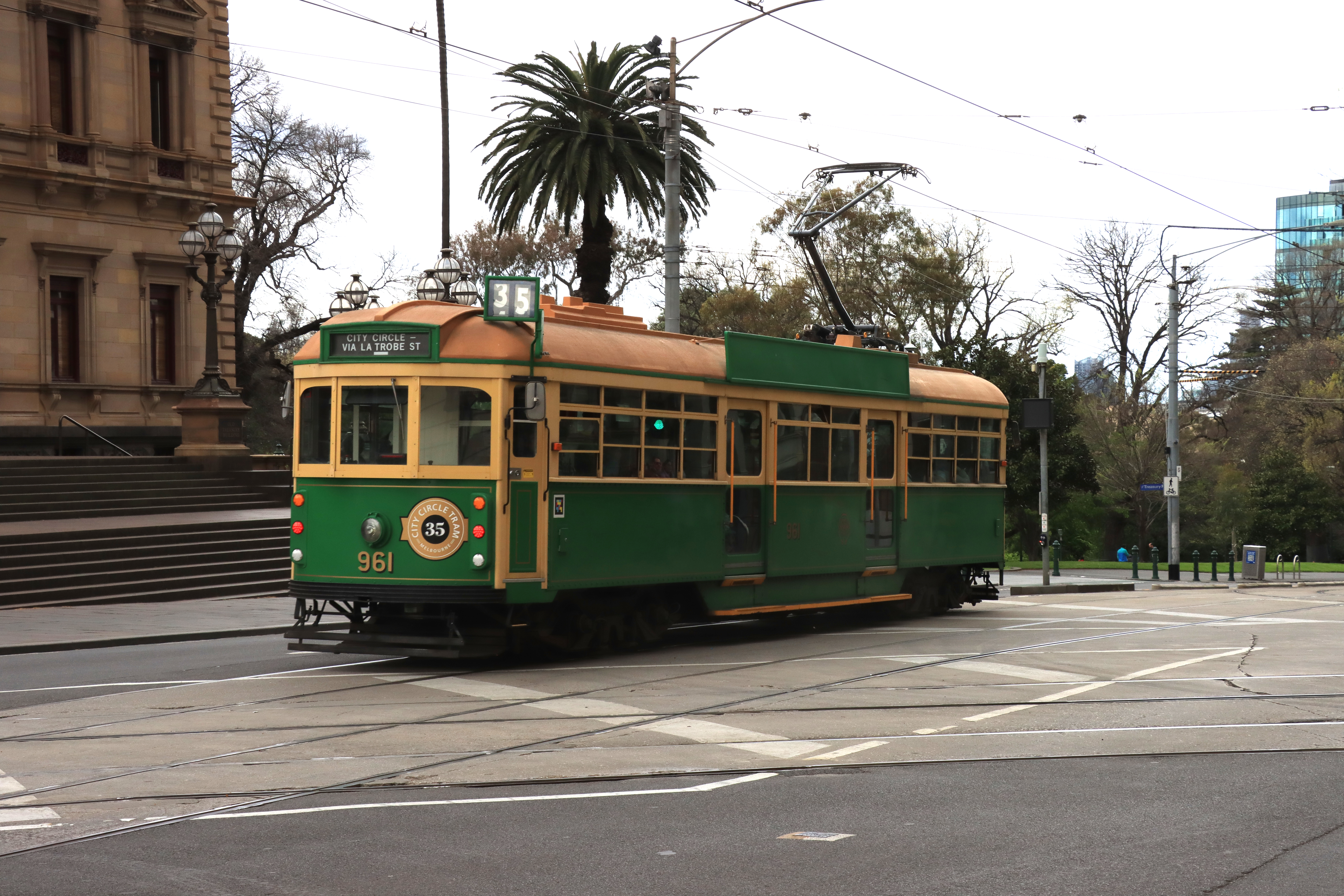
- W class tram W8.961 crosses the Spring Street, Collins Street and MacArthur Street intersection, September 2024

Overview
- System: Melbourne tramway network
- Operator: Yarra Trams
- Depot: Southbank
- Vehicle: W class
- Began service: 29 April 1994

Route
- Start: Waterfront City
- Via: Harbour Esplanade; La Trobe Street; Nicholson Street; Spring Street; Flinders Street; Harbour Esplanade
- End: Waterfront City
- Zone: Free Tram Zone
- Timetable: City Circle timetable
- Map: City Circle map
Route map
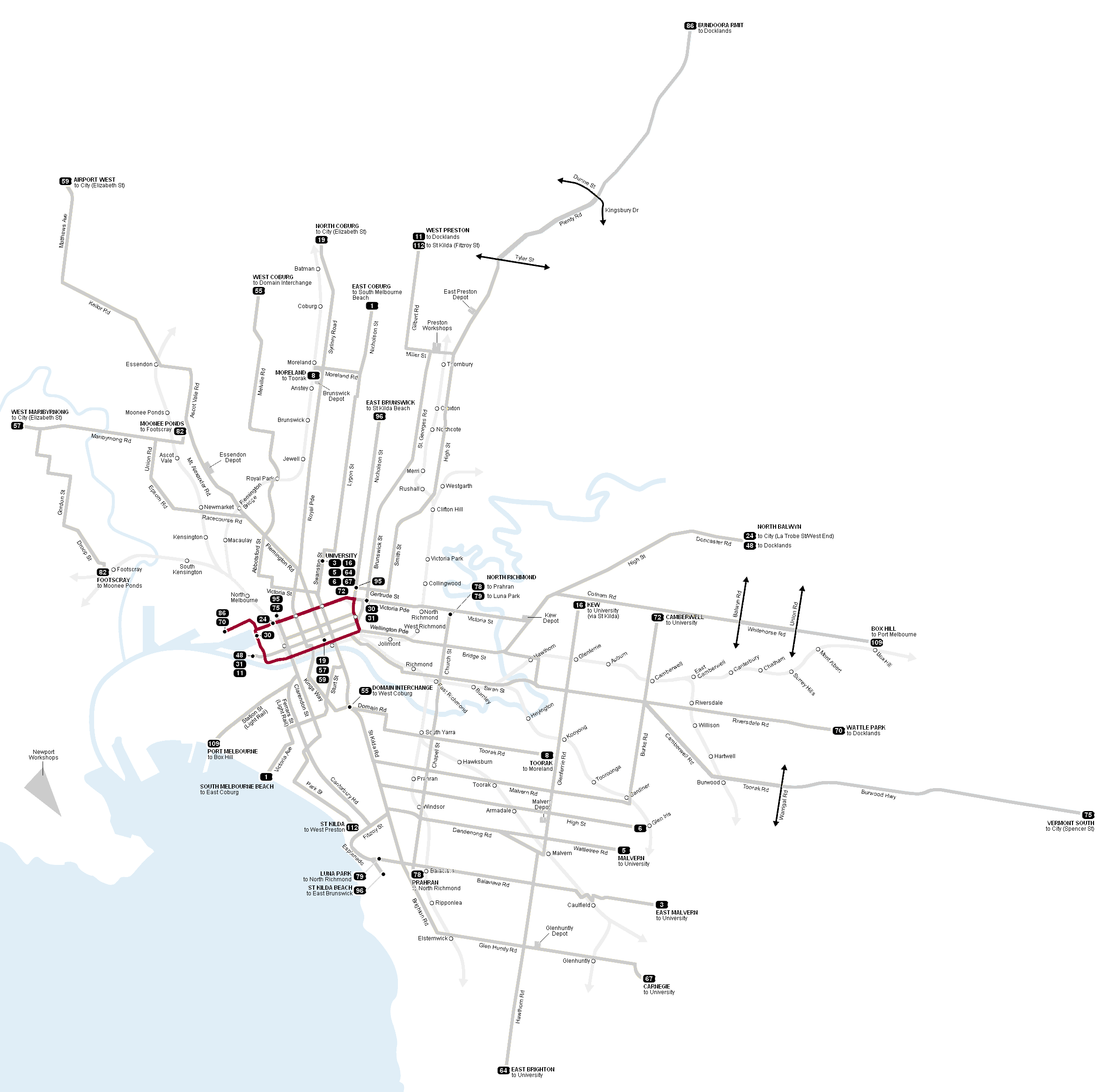


The City Circle (Melbourne tram route 35) is a zero-fare tram running around the Melbourne central business district in Australia. Running along the city centre's outermost thoroughfares the route passes many Melbourne attractions including Parliament House, the Old Treasury Building and the developing Docklands waterfront precinct. Since October 2023, it operates in a clockwise direction only.

== History ==
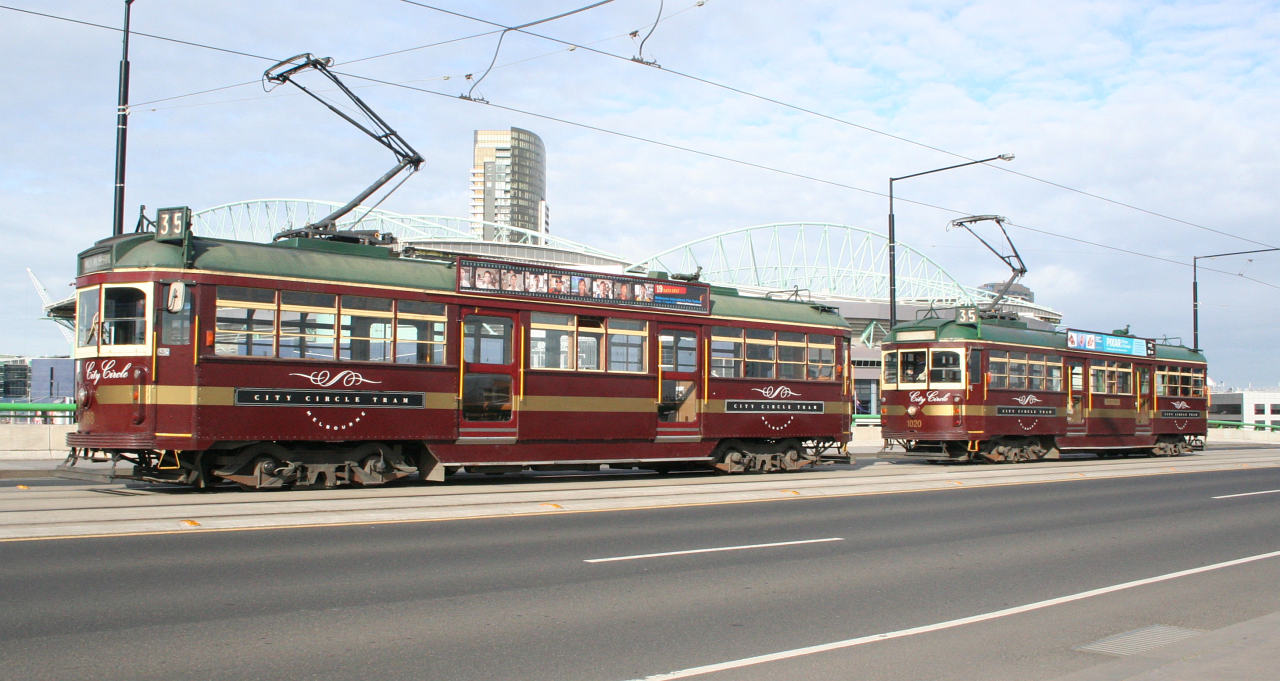
City Circle trams on La Trobe Street in August 2007

The tram route was introduced on 29 April 1994, requiring a small track extension along Spring Street, between Collins and Flinders Streets, to enable a complete CBD loop to be formed. The Federal Government's Building Better Cities program funded the $6.4 million capital cost of the track expansion, while the State Government funded the running costs.

Until January 2003, the western leg of the original route of the tram was down Spencer Street, but the route was then extended west to run through Harbour Esplanade, Docklands. The travel time around the circle before this change was 40 minutes.

Between May and November 2005, the route temporarily ran between Flinders Street / Spencer Street and Victoria Parade / Nicholson Street due to the closure and removal of the Flinders Street Overpass over King Street.

During early 2006, new Passenger Information Displays were installed along with Digital Voice Announcements.

In April 2008, the service adopted the daylight saving timetable on a permanent basis, operating from 10:00 to 21:00 every Thursday, Friday and Saturday. The end of service at other times is 18:00.

On 30 May 2009, the route was altered for a second time, being extended from Harbour Esplanade to the NewQuay and Waterfront City precincts via Docklands Drive. This made the route an elongated 'q'.

Services after 18:00 between Thursday and Sunday were removed in November 2020.

Due to driver shortages, the route's operator, Yarra Trams, has found it hard to run all City Circle tram services. Due to this, since 30 October 2023, the route only runs in a clockwise direction between 9:30 and 17:30 daily.

== Route ==
Interactive map of Melbourne tram route 35.

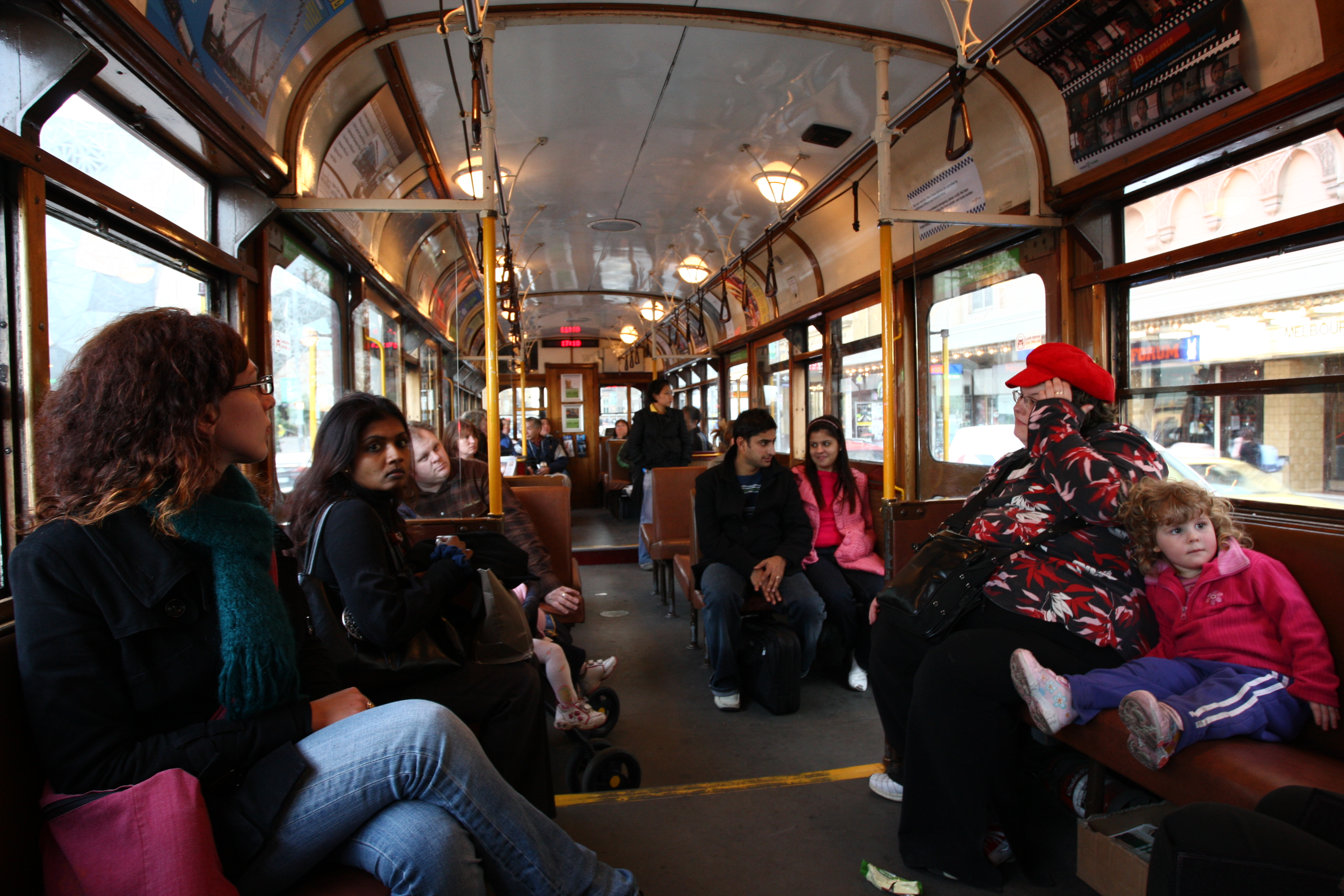
Interior of a W class tram in City Circle service

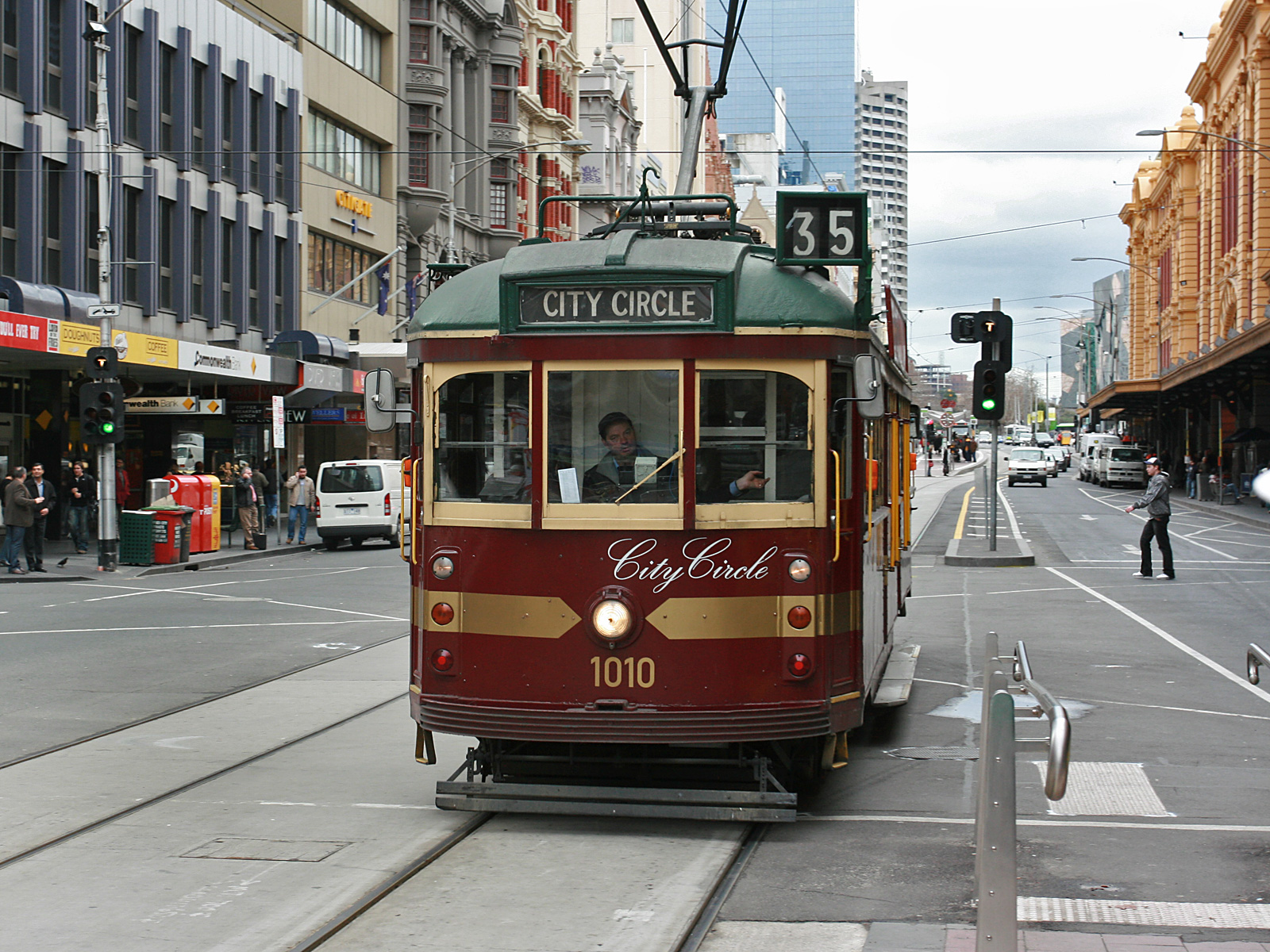
W class tram on Flinders Street in August 2008

The route of the City Circle trams roughly follows the outer edges of the Hoddle Grid, with three diversions. It takes in all of La Trobe Street, Harbour Esplanade and Flinders Street. It follows Spring Street between Flinders and Bourke Streets, but travels along Nicholson Street and Victoria Street before turning into La Trobe Street. At the junction of Harbour Esplanade and Latrobe Street trams turn off the loop to run to and from a terminus towards the end of Docklands Drive, Waterfront City.

== Operation ==
The City Circle route is operated with heritage W class trams, restored to original condition as part of the W8 upgrade. As of 2020, these are the only W-class trams on the system, and there are no plans to retire them. The City Circle trams originally sported a unique maroon livery promoting the service, however as part of the W8 upgrade the trams were restored back to their original green and cream livery. Until 2014, the City Circle was one of several routes to run W-class trams (30, 78 and 79) but the remaining routes controversially had their W-class trams removed, mostly replaced by A class. Trams display the route number 35. The City Circle operates at a headway of 12 minutes in the clockwise direction, with the service taking approximately 60 minutes to complete a loop. An average of three million passengers use the service every year, with each tram circling the city 9 times a day, or 12 times when the tram operates to 21:00.
