= Z class Melbourne tram =

Australian single-unit bogie tram

Z class
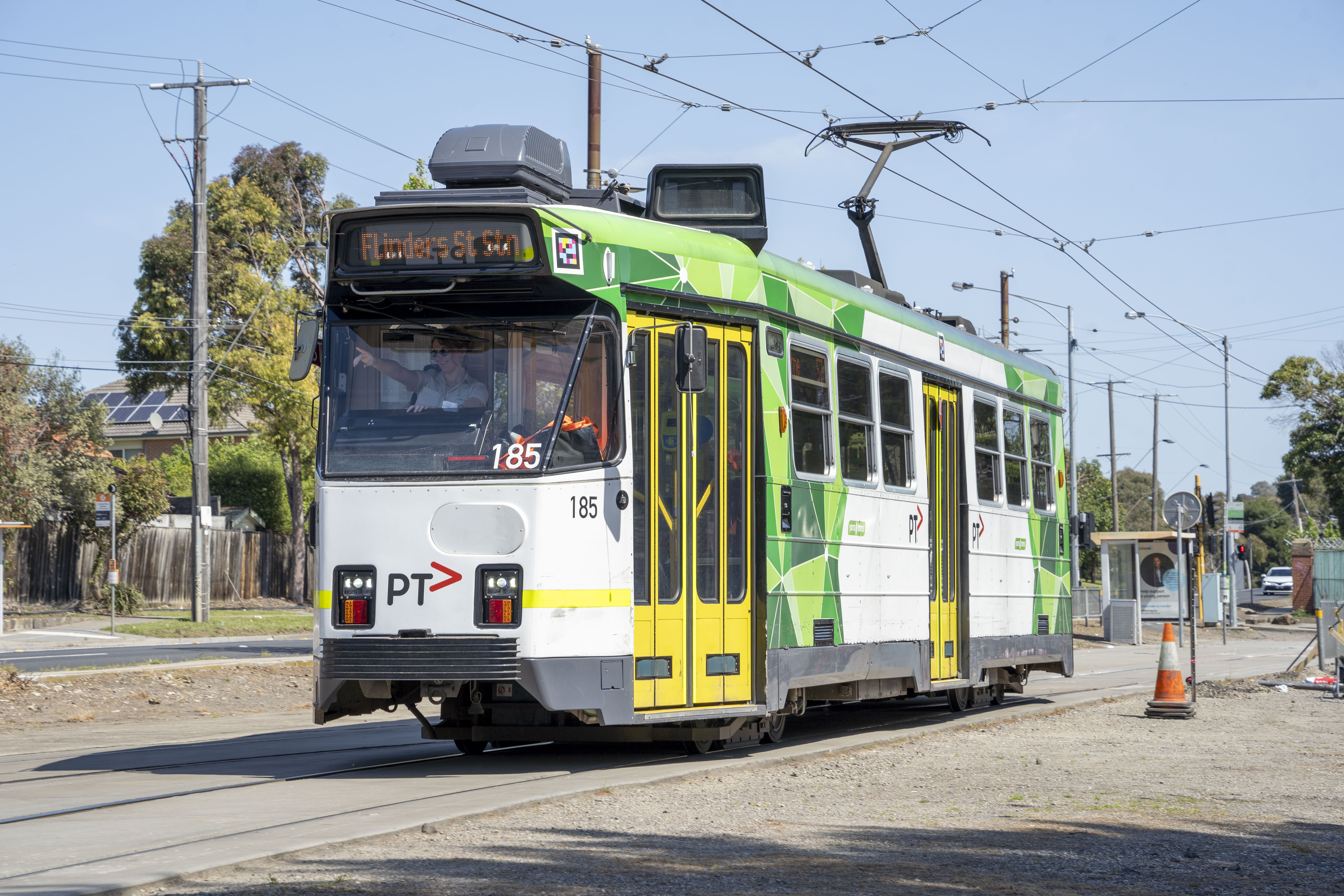
- Z3.185 on a Route 57 service departing Maribyrnong terminus, October 2024

- Refurbished Z3 class interior
- Manufacturer: Comeng
- Assembly: Dandenong
- Replaced: Many W2 and SW2 class trams
- Constructed: 1975–1983
- Entered service: 1975
- Number built: 230
- Number in service: 86
- Number preserved: 6
- Number scrapped: 34
- Successor: Z1/Z2: C1, D, and E classes; Z3: G class
- Fleet numbers: Z1 1–Z1 100; Z2 101–Z2 115; Z3 116–Z3 230
- Capacity: Z1/Z2: 48/70; Z3: 42/70; (seated/standing)
- Depots: Brunswick; Essendon; Glenhuntly; Malvern

Specifications
- Train length: Z1/Z2: 16 m (52 ft 6 in); Z3: 16.64 m (54 ft 7 in)
- Width: 2.67 m (8 ft 9 in)
- Height: Z1/Z2: 3.55 m (11 ft 8 in); Z3: 3.41 m (11 ft 2 in)
- Doors: 4 double, 2 single (Z3 only)
- Wheel diameter: Z1/Z2: 680 mm (27 in); Z3: 660 mm (26 in)
- Wheelbase: 1.8 m (5 ft 11 in)
- Maximum speed: 70–72 km/h (43–45 mph) (design); 60 km/h (37 mph) (service)
- Weight: Z1/Z2: 19 t (19 long tons; 21 short tons); Z3: 21.8 t (21.5 long tons; 24.0 short tons)
- Traction system: Z1/Z2: ASEA Tramiac resistance control; Z3: AEG/Siemens chopper control
- Traction motors: Z1/Z2: 4 × ASEA LJB 23/2 57 kW (76 hp); Z3: 2 × AEG ABS 3322 195 kW (261 hp)
- Power output: Z1/Z2: 228 kW (306 hp); Z3: 390 kW (523 hp)
- Acceleration: 1.5 m/s^{2} (3.4 mph/s)
- Deceleration: 1.6 m/s^{2} (3.6 mph/s) (Dynamic braking); 1.4 m/s^{2} (3.1 mph/s) (Mechanical braking); 3 m/s^{2} (6.7 mph/s) (Emergency)
- Electric systems: 600 V DC (nominal) from overhead catenary
- Current collection: Pantograph
- UIC classification: Bo′Bo′ (Z1/Z2); B′B′ (Z3)
- Bogies: Z1/Z2: ASEA; Z3: Duewag tandem-drive
- Track gauge: 1,435 mm (4 ft 8 1/2 in) standard gauge

The Z class are single-unit bogie trams that operate on the Melbourne tram network. Between 1975 and 1983, 230 trams spanning three sub-classes were built by Comeng, in Dandenong. The design was based on two similar Gothenburg tram models, and a prototype built by the Melbourne & Metropolitan Tramways Board. While the Z1 and Z2 class trams were very similar, the Z3 class had significant design changes.

Since introduction they have had a variety of liveries, and modifications. The Z1 and Z2 class trams have been retired, with 86 Z3 class trams remaining in service.

== History ==
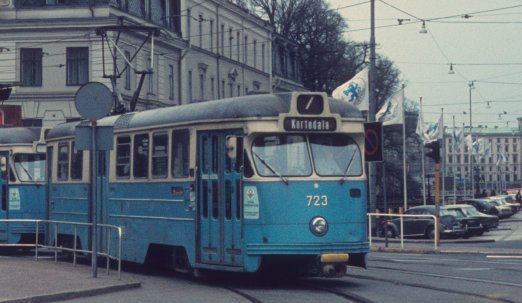
Gothenburg M28 tram, the inspiration for the prototype PCC 1041 and Z class trams

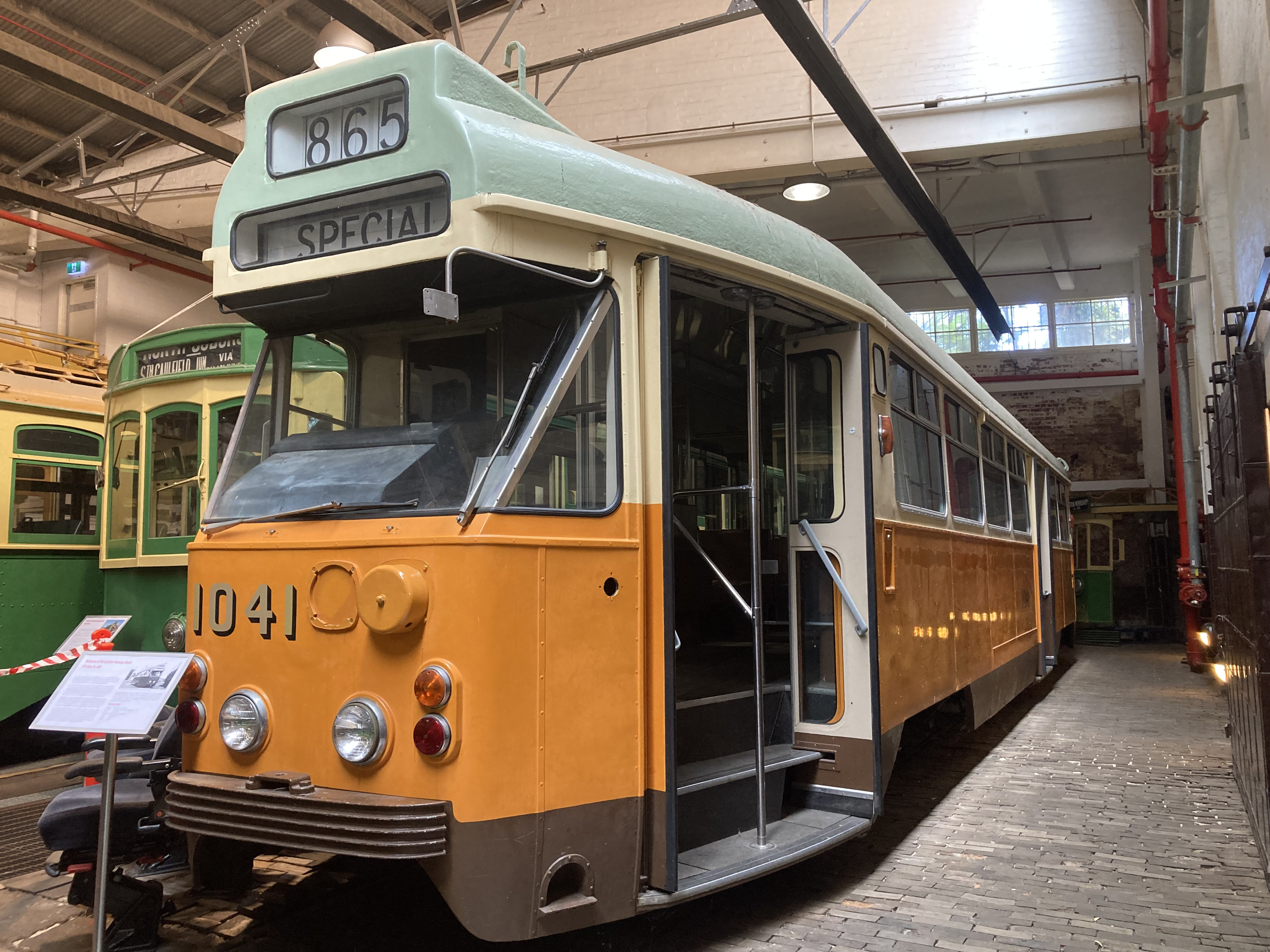
Preserved prototype PCC 1041, in Melbourne & Metropolitan Tramways Board's marigold livery, at the Hawthorn Tram Museum in October 2023

When Melbourne & Metropolitan Tramways Board (MMTB) staff were sent to Europe in 1965 to investigate other tramway operations, they took interest in Swedish trams, and upon return in 1966 drew up specifications, and had a timber mockup built. This mockup was to be the basis for a new tram design for Melbourne. The MMTB approved of the design, and in 1972 requested a prototype be constructed, the result was PCC 1041 being built at Preston Workshops. It was 'European in appearance' and utilised some components bought new, and many recycled from an earlier prototype tram, PCC 980. Prototype PCC 1041 became the basis of the Z class trams, influenced by the M28 design running in Gothenburg, Sweden. PCC 1041 was to be launched by Premier Rupert Hamer on 26 August 1973, but the tram failed at the launch in front of the media. Due to constant electrical failures, PCC 1041 was infrequently used and was out of service between April 1975 and October 1976. PCC 1041 was finally withdrawn in 1984.

Despite the failure of PCC 1041, 100 Z1 class trams were ordered. Between 1974 and 1983, a total of 230 Z1 to Z3 class trams were built by Comeng at Dandenong.

At the end of the 1982/83 financial year the Victorian Government arranged a sale-and-lease-back deal covering 50x Z1, 24x Z3 and 13x A1 class trams along with the automatic vehicle monitoring system used across the network. The sale was for A$507,000,000.

Between 1995 and 1999, the remaining 106 Z1s and Z2s were refurbished by Goninan. The bodies were overhauled in an area of Preston Workshops allocated to Goninan, and the bogies were sent to Goninan's Auburn, New South Wales facility. On all except four, the flap type destination displays and route number indicators were replaced by dot-matrix displays.

When the Melbourne tram network was privatised in August 1998, M>Tram was allocated 94 Z1s, 12 Z2s and 84 Z3s, and Yarra Trams received 31 Z3s. Yarra Trams later transferred its Z3s to M>Tram in 2002 as the C class trams arrived to replace them. Yarra Trams’ former units were either refurbished and repainted in M>Tram livery or left in the former Met Green & Yellow livery after their transfer to M>Tram.

It was envisaged that the delivery of the C and D class trams would allow for the Z1 and Z2s to be retired after the 2006 Commonwealth Games, but rising patronage levels necessitated the retention of 30 Z1 and three Z2s until the E class trams entered service from 2014. Half of those remained in service in December 2015, and the last were withdrawn in April 2016.

In late 2007, the Z3s with analogue signage were fitted with digital signage, replacing the original rolling route destination displays.

== Liveries ==
The Z1 and Z2s were delivered in a livery of marigold (orange) with oriental gold roof; the first four or so were numbered with W2 gold-and-black transfers, but were later changed to the same off-white-and-black as carried by rest of the Z-type in Marigold or Deep Yellow livery. The Z3s were delivered in a livery of deep yellow (pale orange) with a burmese gold roof. For both liveries, the window-level panels were painted off-white (officially "string"), and skirt panels below floor-level were chocolate brown to match the bogies and wheels. From Z3 223 onwards, all were delivered in the Metropolitan Transit Authority's olympic green and wattle yellow livery.

== Subclasses ==
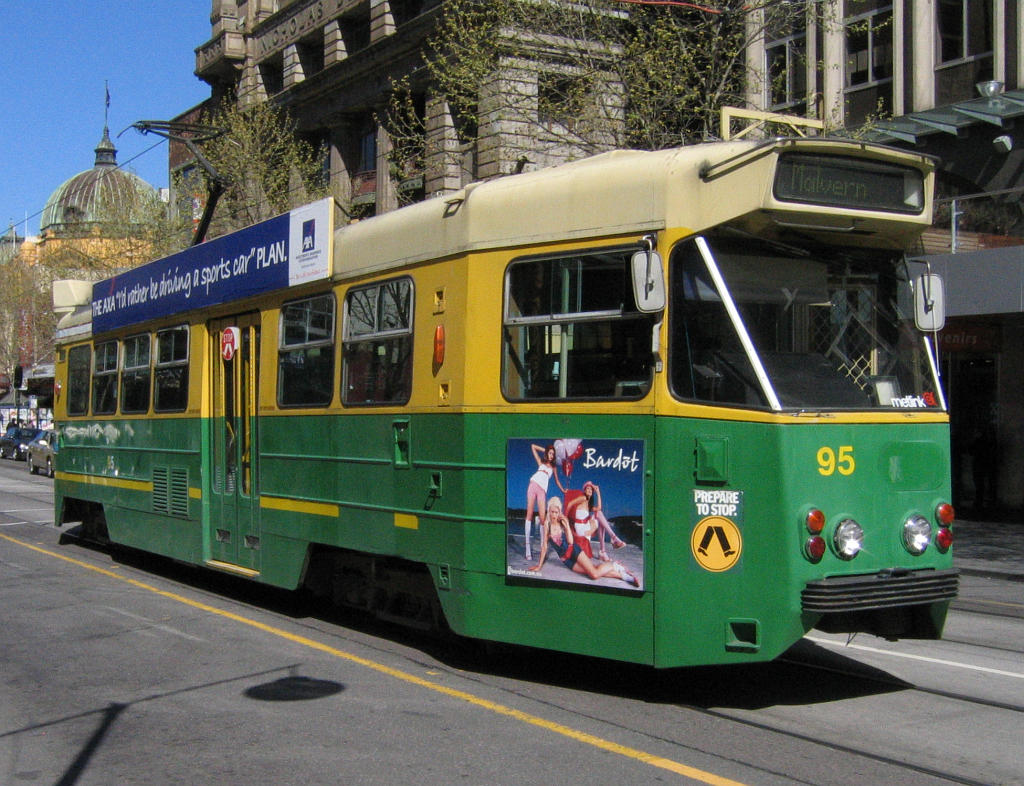
Z1 95 in Metropolitan Transit Authority livery on Swanston Street in September 2006

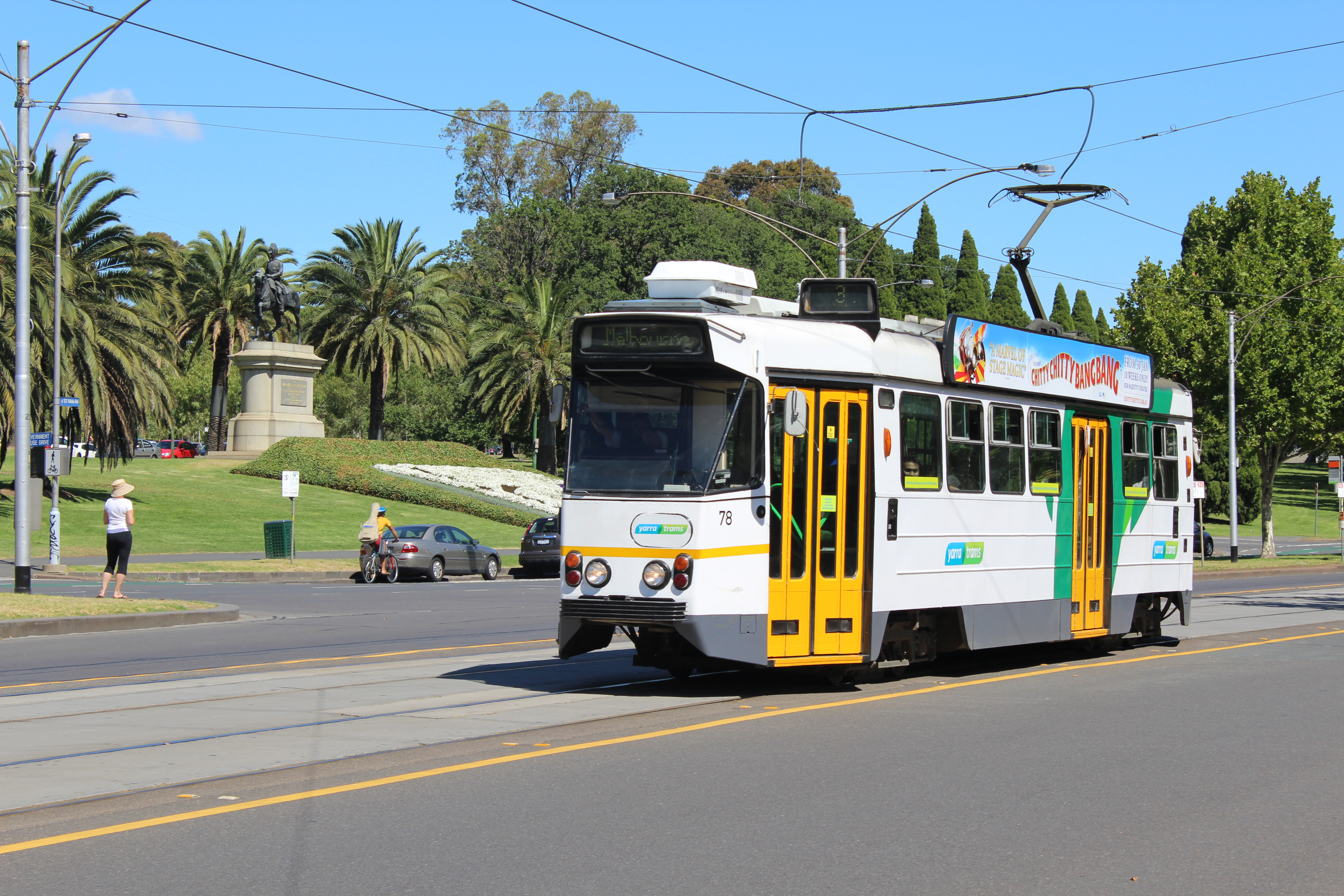
Z1 78 on St Kilda Road in February 2013

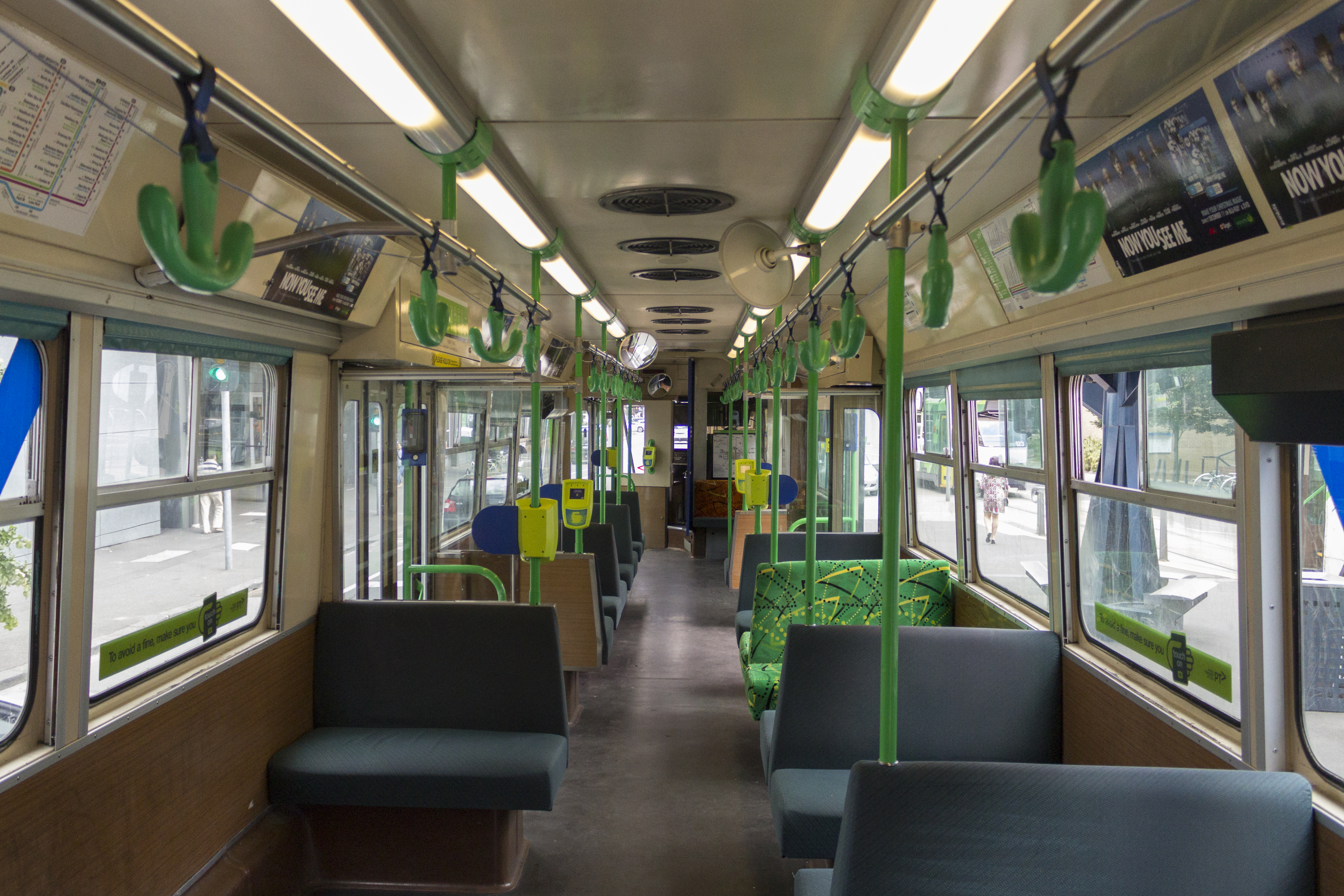
Interior of a Z1 class in December 2013

The initial 80 were classified as the 'Z class. After modifications were made to the suspension, the next 20 entered service as the Z1 class. As the first 80 received these modifications, they were reclassified as Z1s. The next two batches were delivered as the Z2 and Z3s'.

=== Z1 class ===
In 1972 Rupert Hamer became Premier of Victoria, promising new trams, which had been highlighted as needed in the 1969 Melbourne Transportation Plan. Comeng, in anticipation of a tender, dispatched workers to Europe who, knowing of the fondness within the MMTB of the Swedish tram design, acquired the plans for the Gothenburg M29 tram from Hägglund & Söner. It was understood that ASEA would supply the electrical equipment, as they had been involved in the supply of equipment for the Gothenburg M28 which was almost identical to the Gothenburg M29 trams, and had recently acquired the rolling stock division of Hägglund & Söner.

Tenders for 100 trams based on prototype PCC 1041's design were called for in 1972 with Comeng awarded a contract in 1973. The plans purchased by Comeng proved to be less useful than anticipated, due to them being metric, single ended (with doors only on one side), and to some extent 'over-designed'. Comeng essentially started anew, but retained elements of the structural design and ASEA as the electrical equipment supplier, who would supply equipment from the Gothenburg M28 design.

There were a number of design changes made which differentiated the Z class from PCC 1041, including the destination display arrangement. Internally they, like PCC 1041, had conductors consoles that passengers would have to queue for, and only two doors per side, these two features hampered loading and proved unpopular. Fitting the ASEA M28 equipment into the Z class body, which was heavily based on the M29, posed a problem due to the extra doors, tapered ends, and second cab Comeng had added to make them able to operate in Melbourne, this necessitated lengthening the design to accommodate the equipment.

Construction started at Comeng Dandenong in 1974, with Dandenong's workforce tripling to cope with the order. The first Z1 class tram was delivered in December 1974, and the last in May 1978. Major construction was carried out at Dandenong, with bogie frames fabricated at Granville, and final fit out and commissioning occurring at the MMTB's Preston Workshops.

After being unveiled to the press on 30 April 1975, the first entered service on route 64 on 5 May 1975 and the second on route 72 two days later. As more were delivered, the first 15 were concentrated at North Fitzroy depot to operate route 96 from 30 June 1975.

Soon after commissioning it became apparent that the Z class had ride problems due to stiff suspension, and track differences between Gothenburg and Melbourne. The issues were rectified by the time the 80th tram was constructed, and the fix, rubber secondary suspension, was retrofitted to all trams. The braking systems also had issues, and were seen as insufficient by the MMTB.

In anticipation of the Z3 class contract, Z1 No. 5 was fitted with chopper control in November 1977 for evaluation purposes and reclassified ZC class No. 5. Although it was converted back later, the test successfully demonstrated chopper control trams could operate on the Melbourne tram system without causing interference, and all Z3 class trams were fitted with chopper controls.

In March 2006, Z1 class' 81 was returned to service as the Karachi to Melbourne Tram for the 2006 Commonwealth Games. Renumbered W-11 in recognition of buses operated in Karachi, Pakistan famous for their entertainment value, it was decorated with lush designs and played Bhangra and Pakistani music. For the duration of the games it operated on the City Circle. It returned to service in the summer of 2006/07 operating Friday night City Circle services.

Most of the Z class were withdrawn following the introduction of the C and D class trams in 2001/02. Most were sold at auction, with some being donated to tram museums. The last remaining Z1 class trams were withdrawn on 24 April 2016. Four have been preserved. Their internal refurbishment had less refurbished features than Z3 class, only seat pads and grab rails/anchors were replaced.

=== Z2 class ===
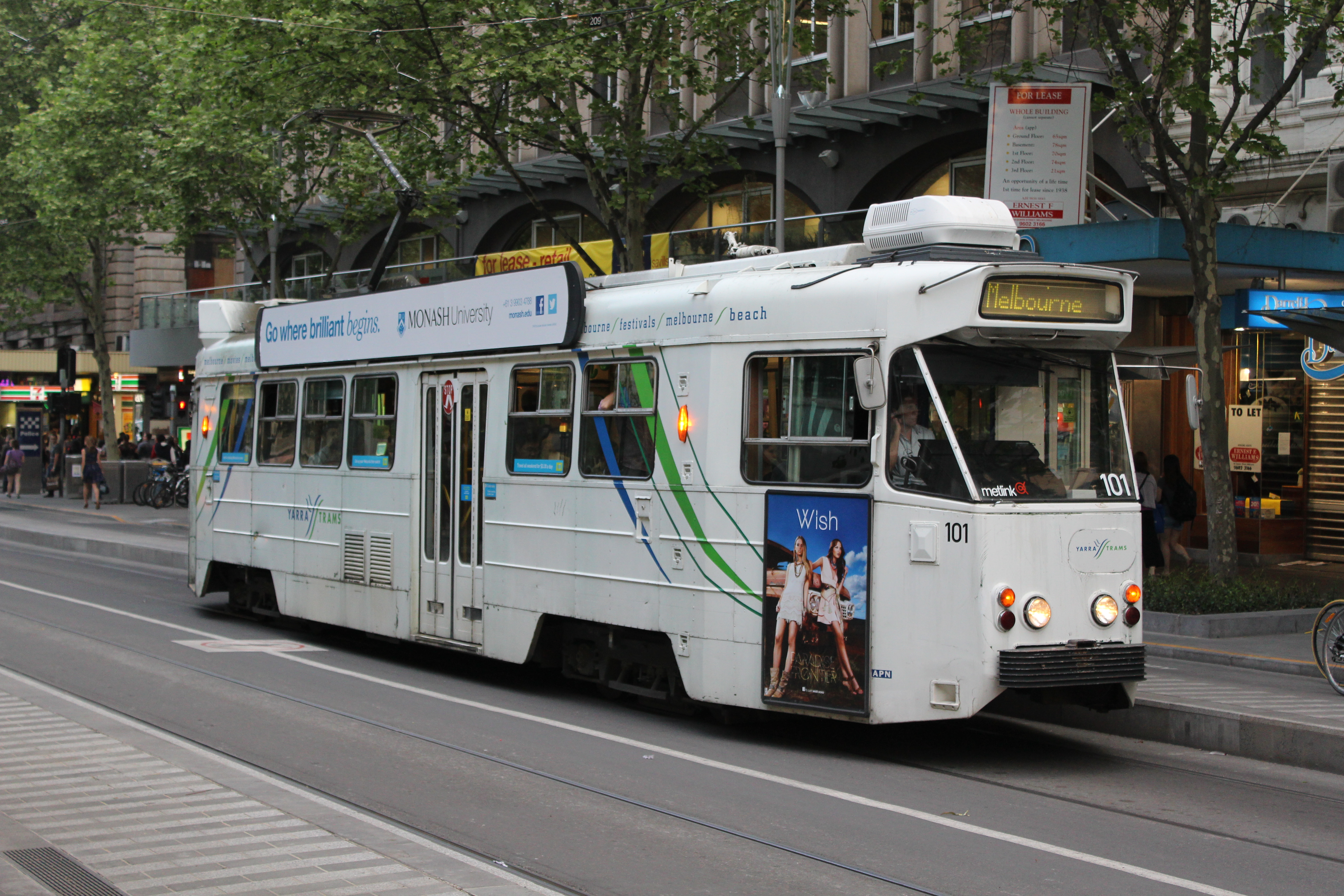
Z2 101 on Swanston Street in October 2012

Between June 1978 and February 1979, 15 more trams were built as Z2 class, as an extension of the Z1 class order. These varied very little from the Z1 class, the main visual differences being the deeper bumper (6-channel like the Z3 class; Z1 class having 4-channel bumpers), and the slide-opening portion of the drivers side-window also being deeper (although at least one Z2 later had a Z1-type drivers side-window fitted). The final Z2 class tram was withdrawn in April 2016, also being replaced with the C and D trams.

=== Z3 class ===
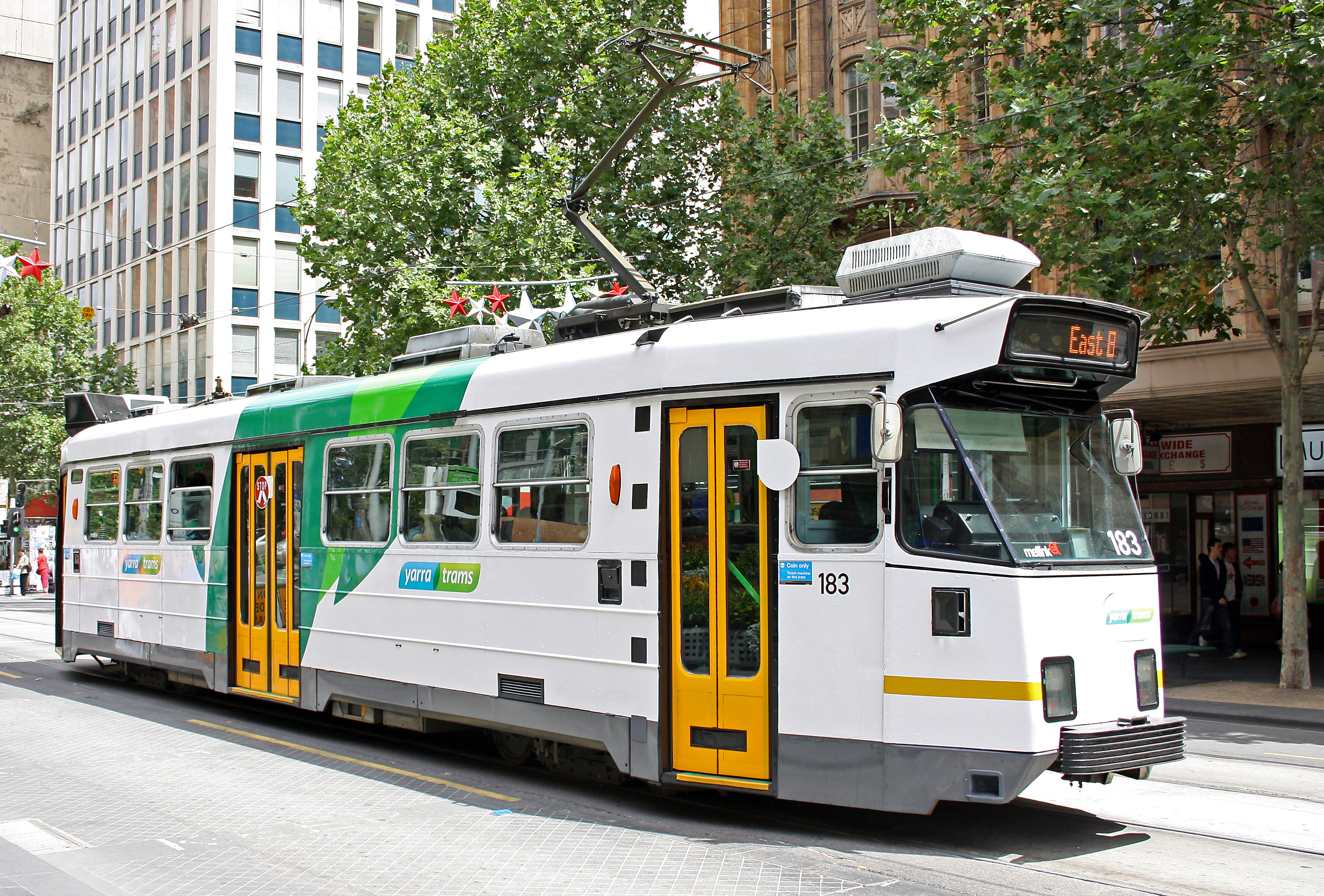
Refurbished Z3 183 in December 2009

A tender for 100 new trams was called by the MMTB in early 1977, Ansair, Comeng and Siemens tendered. Although Comeng originally planning on using ASEA control equipment, as in the Z1 and Z2 class, they opted to give the MMTB a variety of options, leading to 28 different possible configurations of control equipment, bogies, and suspension types. Comeng were ultimately selected, and between 1979 and 1983, 115 Z3 class trams were built.

Although superficially similar to the preceding Z1 and Z2 class trams' externally, they had significant design differences – and were a significant improvement on the Z1 and Z2 class trams. They are fitted with AEG control equipment and Duewag bogies, have an additional door each side (for a total of three rather than two for the Z1 and Z2), drop down (as opposed to top sliding) Beclawat windows and improved headlights. The unreliable flap type destination displays and route number indicators were replaced by rolling plastic film destination displays. They also had much smoother acceleration and braking performance, and improved suspension. Even though the rear door is only half-width (2-leaf, as opposed to the others being 4-leaf), this in combination with the centre doors being directly opposite contributed to better passenger-flow. The Z3 class build process went smoothly, with few problems, bar a slow delivery of equipment from AEG, and a few minor faults that required remedying after construction. One (Z3 149) was scrapped after being destroyed in a fire in 1999.

On 31 July 2000, Z3 214 was used to convey the Olympic flame along Dandenong Road from the intersection with Hawthorn Road to Chapel Street as part of the 2000 Summer Olympics torch relay. On 26 October 2011, Z3 158, specially liveried as a Royal Tram was used to convey Queen Elizabeth II and Prince Philip along St Kilda Road from Federation Square to Government House during their visit to Melbourne. The Royal Tram remained in regular service until February 2013.

In 2013, a program commenced to refurbish all remaining 114 Z3 class trams at Preston Workshops. They received new seats, painted interior walls, glass replacement with scratch proof film applied, and the Public Transport Victoria livery at Preston Workshops.

As of March 2022, 101 Z3 class trams remain in service.

Between 2022 and 2023, 97 Z3 class trams remain in service as 17 Z3 class trams withdrawn including 5 Z3 class trams scrapped.

In 2025, Z3 116 was donated by Yarra Trams to the Ballarat Tramway Museum and transferred to their offsite storage facility on 7 May 2025.

== Use ==
The Z3 class operate on the following routes:

- 1: East Coburg to South Melbourne Beach
- 3: East Malvern to Melbourne University
- 5: Malvern to Melbourne University
- 6: Glen Iris to Moreland
- 16: Kew to Melbourne University
- 57: West Maribyrnong to Flinders Street Station
- 58: West Coburg to Toorak
- 59: Airport West to Flinders Street Station (peak hour only)
- 64: East Brighton to Melbourne University
- 67: Carnegie to Melbourne University
- 72: Camberwell to Melbourne University
- 82: Footscray station to Moonee Ponds Junction

== Preservation ==
Several have been preserved:

- Z1 2 is located at a property in Queensland.
- Z1 3 is privately owned in Yuroke, Victoria.
- Z1 5 by the Tramway Museum Society of Victoria.
- Z1 24 is privately owned.
- Z1 26 is located at Membrey's Transport & Crane Hire, Dandenong.
- Z1 28 is privately owned.
- Z1 43 is located at a property in New South Wales.
- Z1 49 is located at a property near Nowa Nowa.
- Z1 56 is located at The Melbourne Steam Traction Club, Scoresby.
- Z1 58 is located at the CFA training centre, in Craigieburn.
- Z1 75 is privately owned.
- Z1 79 is located at a property in Orange, New South Wales.
- Z1 80 by the Darling Downs Historical Rail Society, Toowoomba
- Z1 81 by VicTrack, on display at Hawthorn depot as the Karachi to Melbourne Tram
- Z1 85 is privately owned.
- Z2 111 by the Sydney Tramway Museum
- Z3 116 is stored at the Ballarat Tramway Museum's offsite facility pending restoration.
