= Kew tram depot =

Coordinates: 37.8127°S 145.0228°E

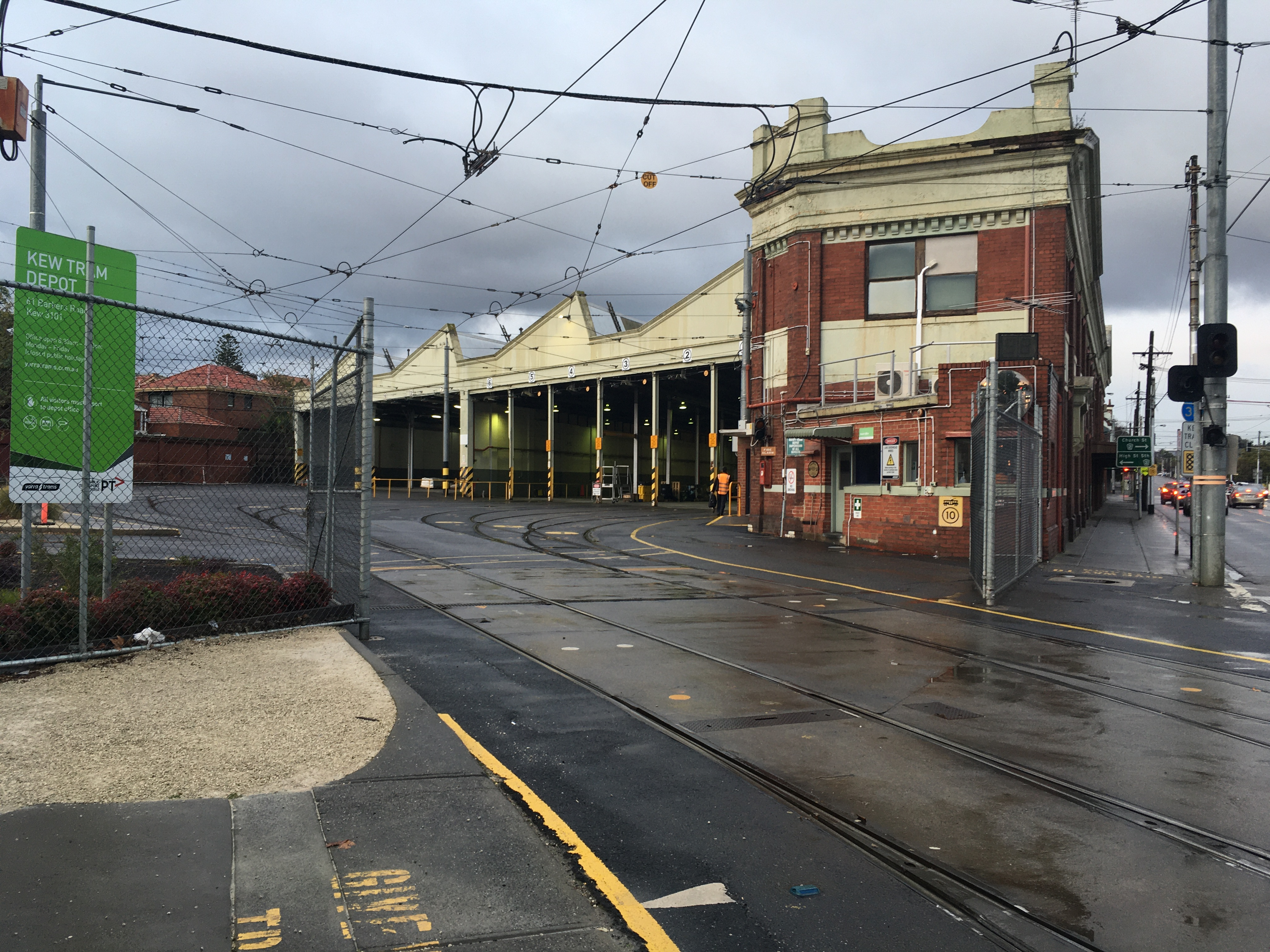
- Entrance to Kew tram depot from Barkers Road in July 2020
- Interactive map of Kew tram depot

Location
- Location: Cnr Barkers Road & High Street, Kew

Characteristics
- Owner: VicTrack
- Operator: Yarra Trams
- Depot code: K
- Roads: 12 (all in sheds)
- Rolling stock: 22 A2 Class; 36 C Class
- Routes served: 48, 78, 109

History
- Opened: 8 May 1915

Kew tram depot is a tram depot in Melbourne. It is located on the corner of Barkers Road and High Street, Kew, a suburb of Melbourne, Australia. Operated by Yarra Trams, it is one of eight tram depots on the Melbourne tram network.

== History ==
Kew tram depot opened on 8 May 1915. When the Public Transport Corporation was privatised in August 1999, Kew depot's operations were passed to Yarra Trams.

== Layout ==
The main yard has 12 covered roads. There are two tracks for trams leaving or entering via Barkers Road, and a single track connecting to High Street. The depot has a tram shed, an inspector's cabin and an administration building, the latter designed by architect Leonard Flannagan.

== Rolling stock ==
As at June 2025, the depot had an allocation of 58 trams: 22 A2 Class and 36 C Class.

== Routes ==
The following routes are operated from Kew depot:

- : Victoria Harbour Docklands to North Balwyn
- : North Richmond to Balaclava
- : Box Hill to Port Melbourne
