= C class Melbourne tram =

2001 Melbourne tram class

C class
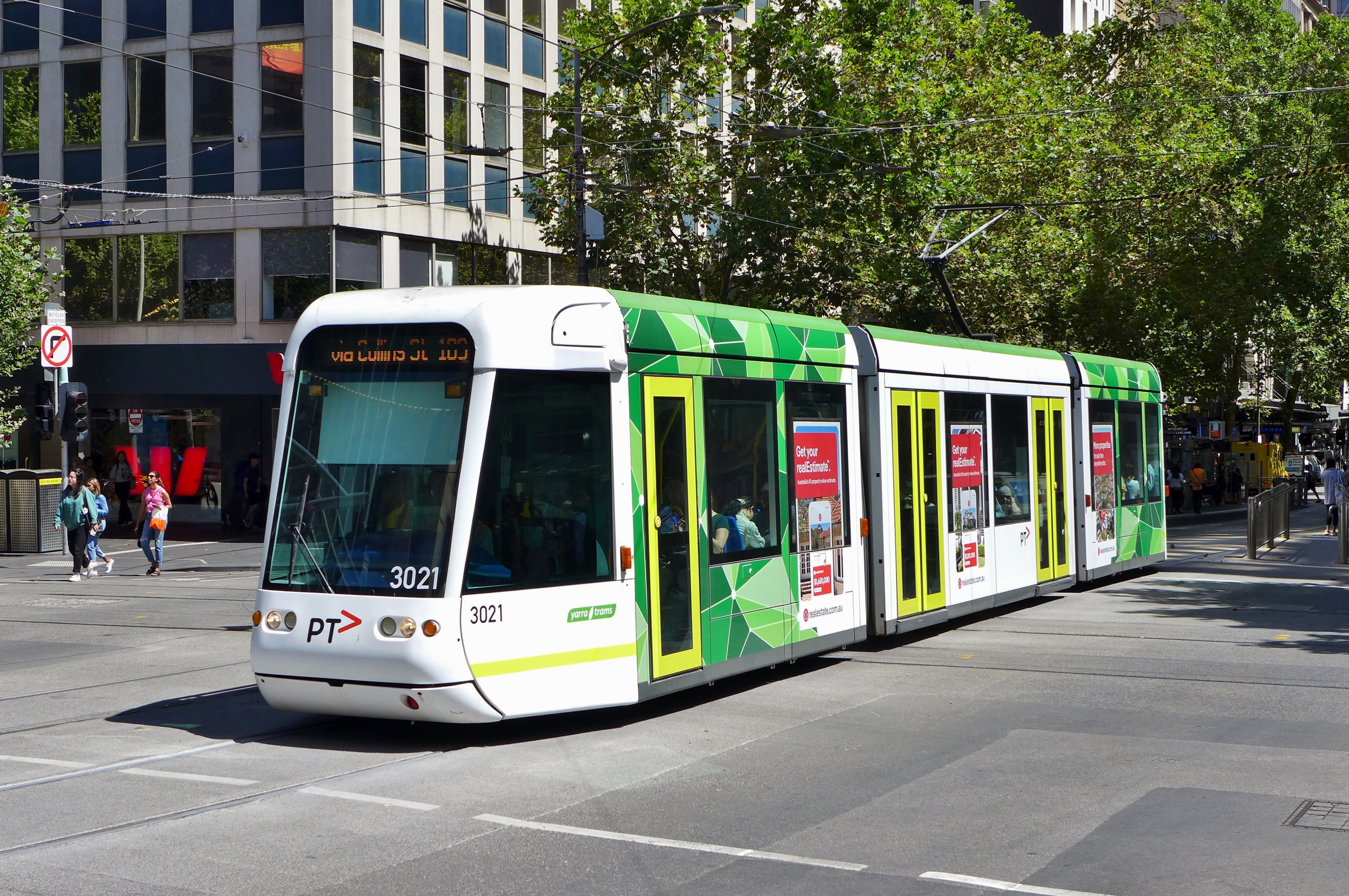
- C1 3021 on Collins Street, February 2023
- Manufacturer: Alstom
- Built at: La Rochelle, France
- Family name: Citadis 202
- Replaced: Most remaining SW5, W6, SW6 and W7 trams (excluding City Circle trams), many Z1 and Z2 trams.
- Constructed: 2001–2002
- Number in service: 36
- Fleet numbers: C1 3001–C1 3036
- Capacity: 40/110 (seated/standing)
- Depot: Kew

Specifications
- Train length: 22.98 m (75 ft 5 in)
- Width: 2.65 m (8 ft 8 in)
- Height: 3.36 m (11 ft 0 in)
- Doors: 6 (3 per side)
- Articulated sections: 3 (two articulations)
- Wheel diameter: 610–530 mm (24–21 in) (new–worn)
- Wheelbase: 1.85 m (6 ft 1 in)
- Weight: 28.6 t (28.1 long tons; 31.5 short tons)
- Traction motors: 4 × Alstom 4-LMA-1245-N 105 kW (141 hp)
- Power output: 420 kW (560 hp)
- Acceleration: 1.57 m/s^{2} (3.5 mph/s)
- Deceleration: 1.2 m/s^{2} (2.7 mph/s) (service); 3 m/s^{2} (6.7 mph/s) (emergency)
- Electric systems: 600 V DC (nominal) from overhead catenary
- Current collection: Pantograph
- UIC classification: Bo′+0′+Bo′
- Bogies: Alstom Solfège
- Track gauge: 1,435 mm (4 ft 8 1/2 in) standard gauge

The C class Melbourne tram is a fleet of three-section Alstom Citadis 202 trams built in La Rochelle, France that operate on the Melbourne tram network. They were the first low-floor trams in Melbourne, being delivered in 2001–2002.

== History ==
To meet a franchise commitment to introduce new trams to replace Z1 and Z2-class trams, 36 three-section Alstom Citadis 202 low-floor trams were purchased by Yarra Trams. They were the first low-floor trams in Melbourne, and the first tram imported for the Melbourne tram system since the 1920s.

The design was adapted by Alstom for local conditions, with the first four trams arriving at Webb Dock on 10 August 2001. Following fit-out and testing at Preston Workshops, they entered service on 12 October 2001. The last arrived on 25 June 2002 and entered service on 30 August 2002. All C1-class trams initially operated solely on route 109.

== Criticisms ==
The Citadis trams have been criticised by the Australian Rail Tram & Bus Industry Union (RTBU), who claim they have operational problems, including injuries to the drivers relating to design. There were concerns raised in 2011 regarding the rear-vision cameras fitted to the trams. Despite Yarra Trams replacing the cameras a number of times, there were visibility problems at night and in high glare situations. These had been solved by July 2012.

The trams have also been described by the RTBU as "cheap as chips", following allegations that swaying and lateral forces at "speeds above 25 km/h" were causing driver injuries. Yarra Trams responded by stating that they were offering drivers lumbar support, and that track renewal had improved ride quality, reducing sway, while the driver's controls had been changed to avoid wrist injuries.

Tram number 3011 has derailed four times, most recently on Sunday 7 May 2023. Each derailment occurred after a collision with a car. The RTBU has again said the model should be removed from service.

== Operation ==
C class trams operate on the following routes:

- 48: North Balwyn to Victoria Harbour Docklands
- 109: Box Hill to Port Melbourne
