= Balaclava, Victoria =

Balaclava
- Suburb
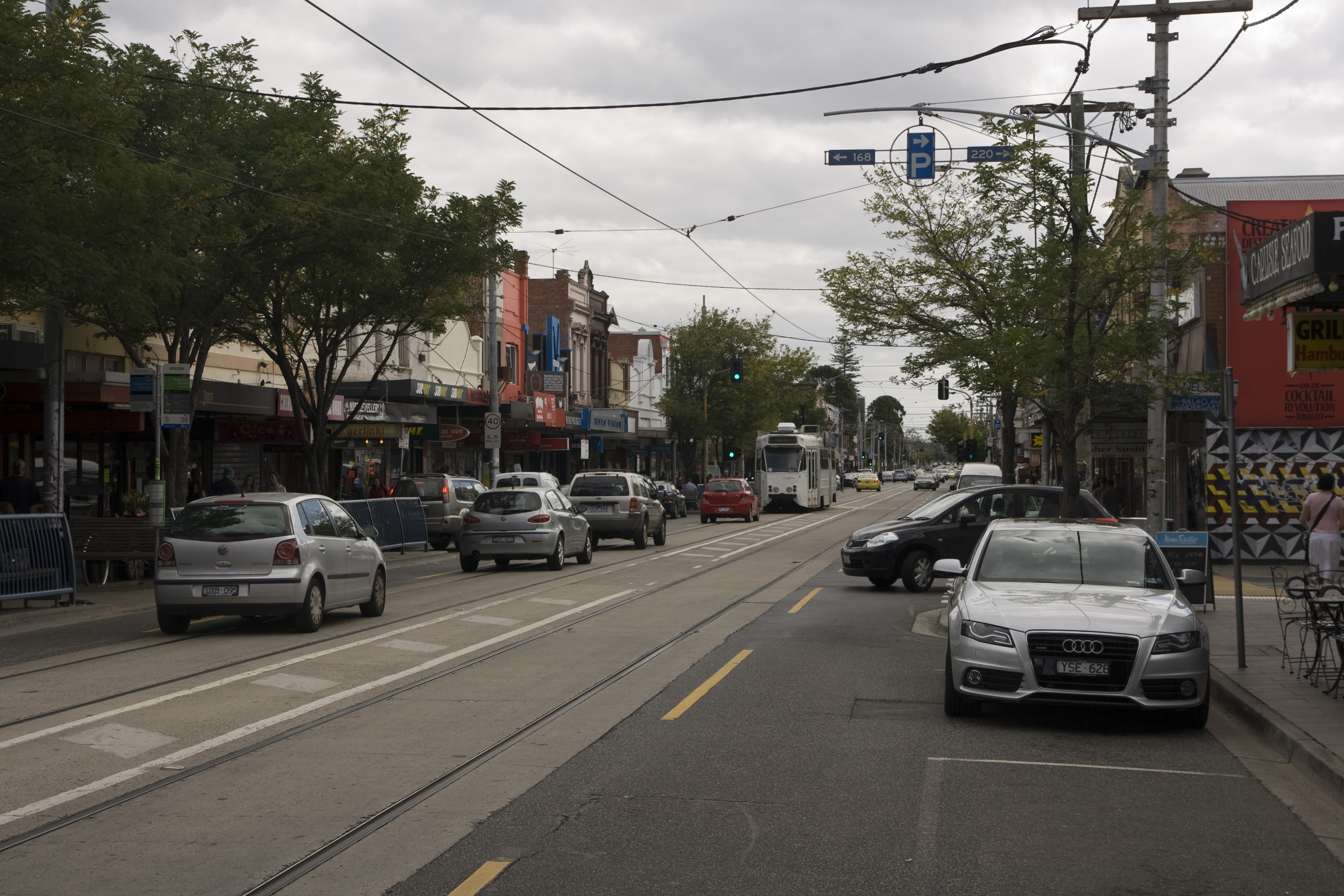
- Carlisle Street

- Interactive map of Balaclava
- Coordinates: 37.873°S 144.993°E
- Country: Australia
- State: Victoria
- City: Melbourne
- LGA: City of Port Phillip
- Location: 7 km (4.3 mi) from Melbourne

Government
  - State electorate: Caulfield
  - Federal division: Macnamara

Area
  - Total: 0.8 km^{2} (0.31 sq mi)
- Elevation: 12 m (39 ft)

Population
  - Total: 5,392 (2021 census)
  - Density: 6,700/km^{2} (17,500/sq mi)
- Postcode: 3183
Suburbs around Balaclava
St Kilda	St Kilda East	St Kilda East
Elwood	Balaclava	St Kilda East
Elwood	Ripponlea	Elsternwick

Balaclava is an inner suburb in Melbourne, Victoria, Australia, 7 km south-east of Melbourne's Central Business District, located within the City of Port Phillip local government area. Balaclava recorded a population of 5,392 at the 2021 census.

Balaclava is located in the south-east of the city, in the St Kilda East area and is bounded by Inkerman Street to the north, Chapel Street to the west, Hotham Street to the east and Oak Grove and Los Angeles Court to the south. In terms of its cadastral division, Balaclava is in the parish of Prahran, within the County of Bourke

The suburb was named after the Battle of Balaclava that took place on 25 October 1854, during the Crimean War.

Well-known comedian Graham Kennedy spent part of his childhood in Balaclava. After his death, the local council placed a commemorative plaque on the house where he lived.

Balaclava is home to a large population of Melbourne's Orthodox Jewish Community, consisting of both Hasidic and non-Hasidic (Misnagdim or Yeshivish) Jews. Within its confines are a number of kosher restaurants and shops that cater to the local and broader Melbourne Haredi communities, as well as specialist Jewish Schools.

Balaclava is also home to several popular restaurants and eaterys, including Melbourne's oldest fish and chip shop, Carlisle Seafood.

== Streets ==
Many streets in Balaclava and its vicinity are named after Crimean War battles; e.g., the Battle of Balaclava (Balaclava Road), the Battle of Inkerman (Inkerman Road), the Siege of Sevastopol (Sebastopol Street), the Battle of the Alma River (Alma Road), the Battle of the Great Redan (Redan Street) and the Battle of Malakoff (Malakoff Street).

One street, Crimea Street, is named after the war itself.

Other streets in the district are named after people connected with the Crimean War; e.g., Lord Raglan (Raglan Street), Lord Cardigan (Cardigan Street), Florence Nightingale (Nightingale Street), François Certain Canrobert (Canrobert Street) and Lord Lucan (Lucan Street).

== Local landmarks ==
- Caulfield Campus of Caulfield Grammar School – the suburb's largest school.
- St Kilda Primary School – a public primary school originally opened in 1875.
- St Colman's School Hall, Carlisle Street (1938–39) – designed to complement the church next door (previously CBC St Kilda's Balaclava Campus, King David School's Carlisle Campus and St Kevin's College's Waterford Campus).
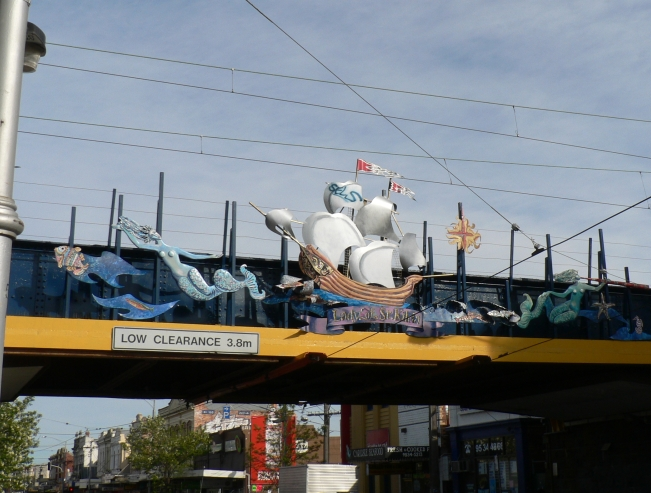
Lady of St Kilda mural, Carlisle Street

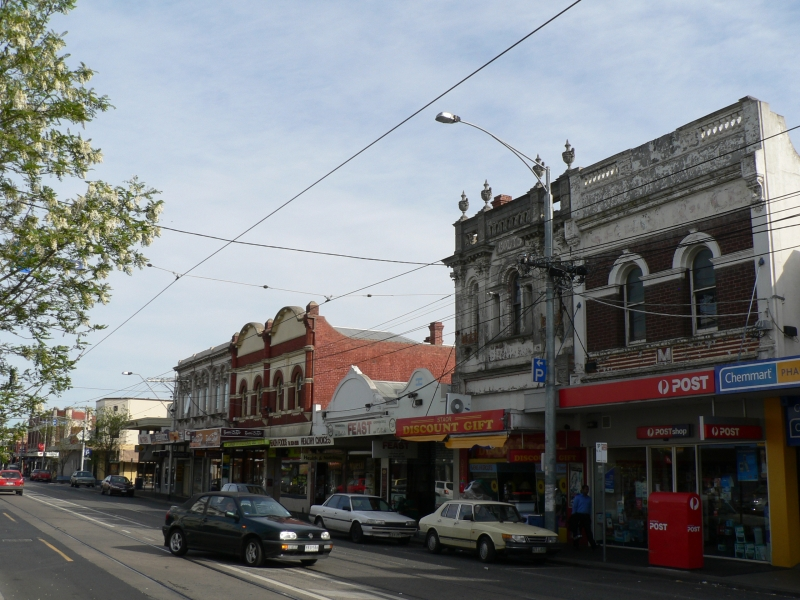
Main shopping strip, Carlisle Street

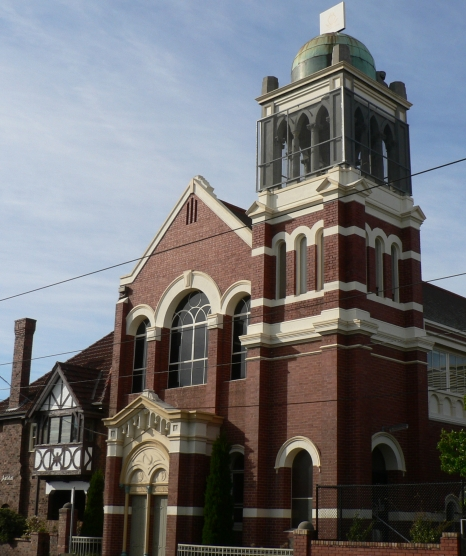
St Colman's School Hall, Carlisle Street

=== Residential architecture ===
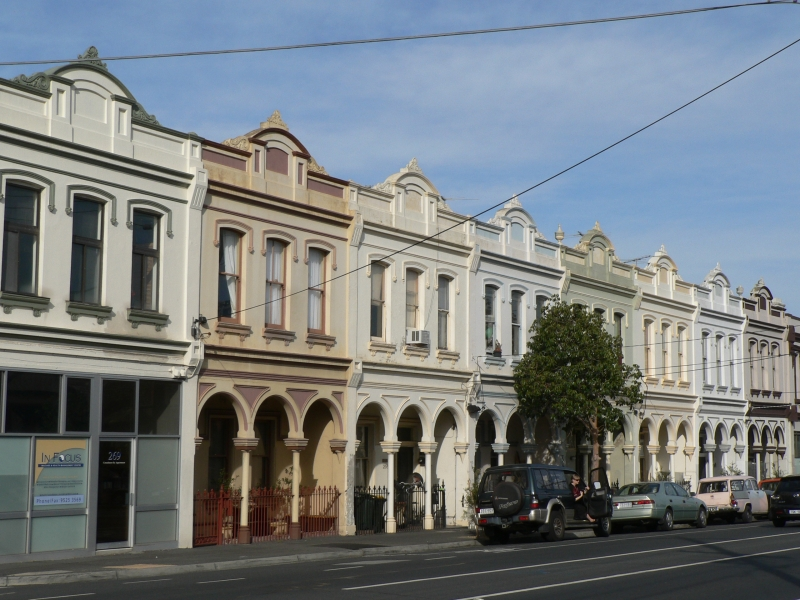
Late 1870s terrace housing in Inkerman Street

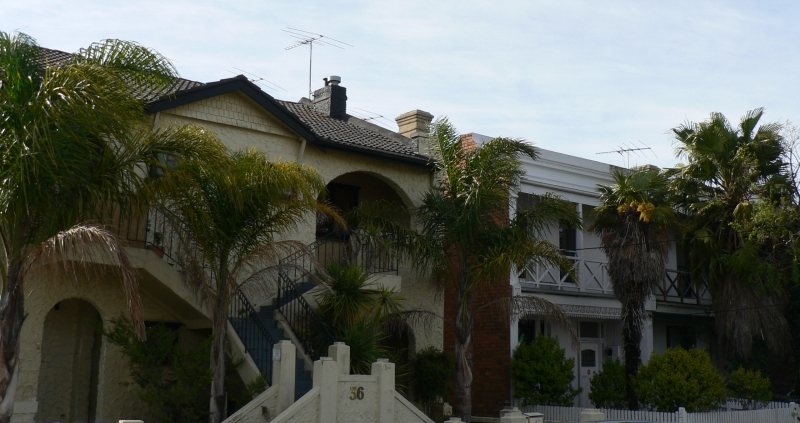
Combinations of Victorian terraces and late Edwardian duplexes, and a variety of subtropical palms

=== Places of worship ===
There are many churches in Balaclava, with many of the modern places of worship serving the Jewish faith, but many of the older buildings have at some point served various Christian religions.

Many of the church buildings in Balaclava are historic and heritage registered and form various religious precincts. Significant church buildings include:

- St Colman's Catholic Church, Carlisle Street (1913, designed by Watts' Sons).
- St George's Presbyterian Church, Chapel Street. Built in 1877–80 to the design of Albert Purchas. Listed on the Victorian Heritage Register.
- Holy Trinity Anglican Church, Chapel Street. Designed by Joseph Reed and built in 1878, the building is Victorian Heritage listed.
- Former Balaclava Corps Hall.
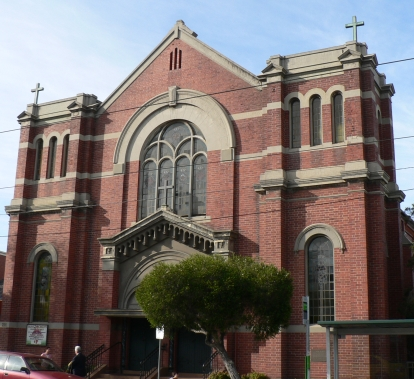
St Colman's Catholic Church, Carlisle Street. Twin decorative towers were removed in the 1960s.

== Transport ==
Balaclava is served by several forms of public transport.

The main railway station, Balaclava, is on the Sandringham railway line.

Tram routes 3 and 16 operate along Carlisle Street and route 78 operates along Chapel Street.

Bus routes 216 and 219 operate along Hotham Street. The importance of these routes has declined in recent years and is subject to change in 2017.

A taxi rank operates on Carlisle Street, outside the Coles Supermarket.

== Notable residents ==
- Graham Kennedy
- Judith Lucy
- Brian Nankervis
- John Safran
- Amy Taylor

== See also ==
- City of St Kilda – Balaclava was previously within this former local government area.
