= North Richmond, Victoria =

Coordinates: 37°48′41″S 144°59′34″E

North Richmond is an official unbounded neighbourhood located in inner Melbourne in the vicinity of North Richmond railway station. It is in the local government area of the City of Yarra.

Victoria Street, Richmond Post Office opened on 3 November 1906 and was renamed Richmond North in 1924. An earlier Richmond North office was open from 1873 until 1880.

In 2018, the labor govenrment placed a Supervised injection site in Melbourne's North Richmond neighbourhood in 2018 on a trial basis. In 2020 the trial was extended for a further three years, and the site remains open as of 2026.

During the 2018 Victorian state election The Liberal-National Coalition opposition ran on shuting down the Supervised injection site. During the 2022 Victorian state election The Liberal opposition ran on moving the inkection site.

In 2025, the Yarra City Council reversed its long-standing support for the location of the North Richmond safe injecting room, voting to formally advocate for the state government to move the facility.
