= Melbourne tram route 112 =

Former tram route in metropolitan Melbourne, Victoria, Australia

Route 112
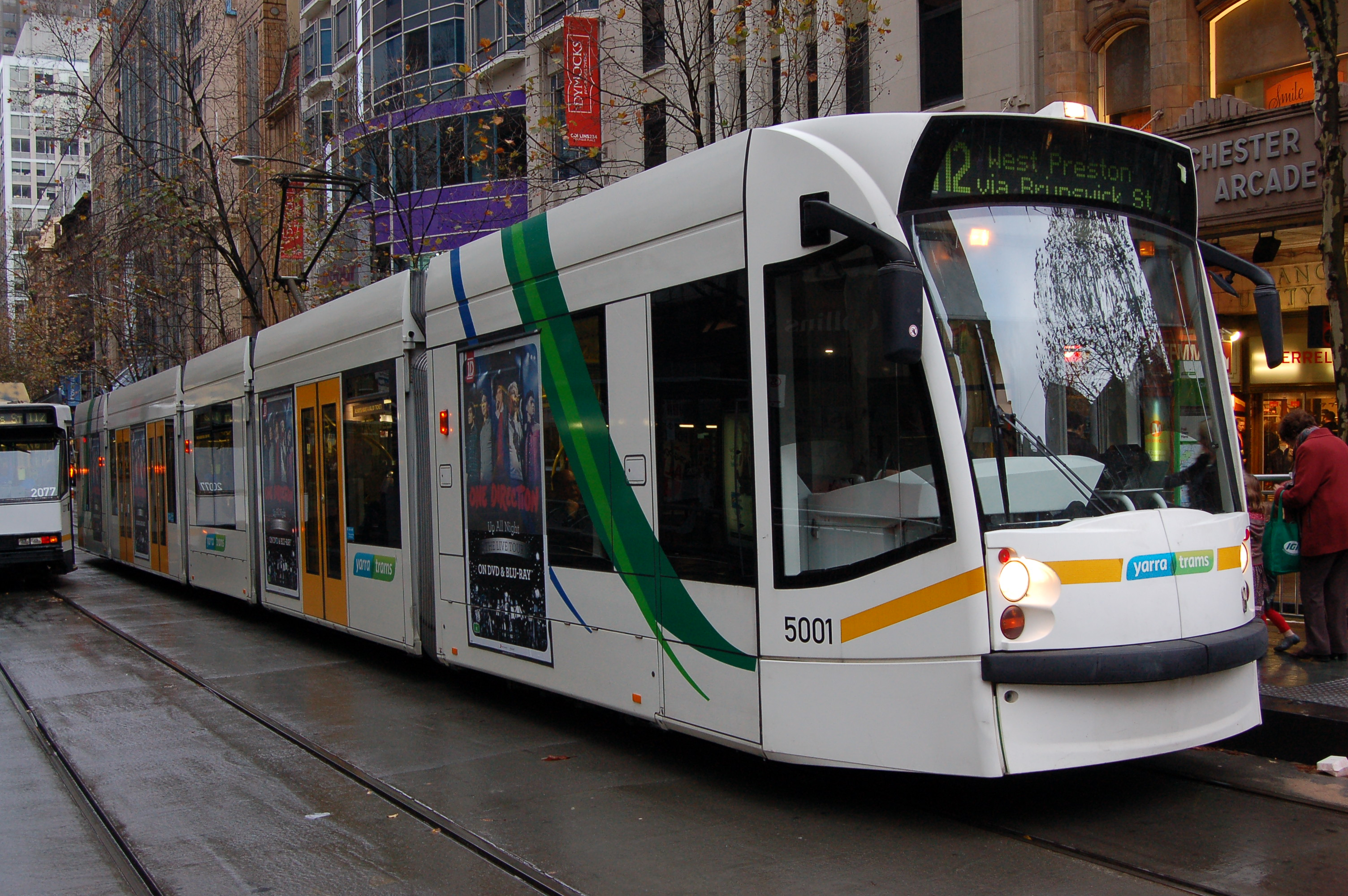
- D2 class tram on Collins Street, May 2012

Overview
- System: Melbourne tramway network
- Operator: Yarra Trams
- Depot: East Preston
- Vehicle: A class B class D2 class
- Began service: 7 August 2000
- Ended service: 26 July 2014

Route
- Start: West Preston
- Via: Thornbury; Northcote; Fitzroy North; Fitzroy; East Melbourne; Collins Street; South Melbourne; Albert Park; Middle Park
- End: St Kilda
- Length: 18.0 kilometres
- Timetable: Route 112 timetable
- Map: Route 112 map

Melbourne tram route 112 was operated by Yarra Trams on the Melbourne tram network from West Preston to St Kilda. The 18 kilometre route was operated out of East Preston depot with A, B and D2 class trams.

The route number was introduced in 2000, and was discontinued on 27 July 2014 as part of a wider timetable change to the Yarra Trams network. This saw route 112 replaced by routes 11 and 12.

== History ==
The origins of route 112 lie in separate tram lines, a cable tram from Spencer Street to Fitzroy North, an electric line from Fitzroy North to West Preston and an electric line from the CBD to Fitzroy Street, St Kilda (partially built utilising a former cable line).

A cable line was opened from Spencer Street to Barkly Street, Fitzroy North along Collins Street, MacArthur Street, Gisborne Street, Victoria Parade, Brunswick Street and St Georges Road on 2 October 1886, by the Melbourne Tramway & Omnibus Company.

After World War I, the municipal Fitzroy, Northcote & Preston Tramways Trust constructed a stand-alone electric tram system, running from the cable tram terminus at Barkly Street, Fitzroy North, over the Merri Creek bridge, and up St Georges Road. Two branches split off at Miller Street, one to East Preston, the other to West Preston, up Gilbert Street to Regent Street, the terminus of the current route 11. The lines were taken over by the newly formed Melbourne & Metropolitan Tramways Board (MMTB) before the first services ran, opening on 1 April 1920. This network was connected to the rest of the electric system and the CBD on 24 March 1925, when an east–west line from Lygon Street, Brunswick along Holden Street (with a dogleg up Pilkington Street and Barkly Street) was built.

On 31 October 1925, a new route to St Kilda via South Melbourne was opened by the MMTB, travelling from St Kilda Road along Sturt Street, Eastern Road, Heather Street, Park Street, Clarendon Street, Albert Road, Canterbury Road, Mills Street, Danks Street, Patterson Street, Park Street, Mary Street and Beaconsfield Parade.

In 1929, the MMTB started converting the Collins Street cable lines to electric traction, with the last cable tram running down Collins Street on 14 September 1929, and the first electric tram on 8 December 1929. The remaining section of cable tram track along Brunswick Street and St Georges Road was converted to electric traction by the MMTB on 26 October 1930, connecting the West Preston electric line to Collins Street.

The South Melbourne cable line was converted to electric traction by the MMTB on 25 July 1937, with the section of track between Clarendon Street and Hanna Street (now Kings Way) along City Road abandoned in favour of a new section of track along Clarendon Street, between City Road and Flinders Street. This allowed trams to travel from St Kilda to Collins Street, along Clarendon Street and Spencer Street.

On 8 November 1959, the track along Mary Street and Beaconsfield Parade, St Kilda West was abandoned in favour of a short extension along Park Street to Fitzroy Street, St Kilda, route 112's final terminus.

From the 1950s until 1992, this line ran mainly as two separate routes which overlapped along Collins Street. Route 12, ran from the Fitzroy Street, St Kilda terminus to St Vincent's Plaza, with the destinations being 'South Melbourne - St Kilda Beach' and 'City - Brunswick Street' respectively. Route 11 was similar to the current route, running from West Preston to the city, terminating at Spencer Street, where trams would reverse. The destinations were simply 'West Preston' and 'City'. A route 10 also operated out of peak hours, which traversed the whole line from West Preston to St Kilda Beach.

Route 10 was discontinued after 29 April 1995, with only routes 11 and 12 operating. In mid-2000, W-class trams were temporarily removed from service due to brake issues. As a result, on 7 August 2000, route 112 was introduced to replace routes 11 and 12 during weekdays, and was essentially a new number for the old route 10. It later (believed to be 9 September 2001) became a full-day service with route 11 becoming peak-hour only and route 12 withdrawn.

In 2005, route 112 was part of the Think>Tram project, with measures aimed at improving tram services introduced to Clarendon Street, South Melbourne.

On 27 July 2014, route 112 was withdrawn and replaced by routes 11 and 12. This was part of the program by Yarra Trams to simplify the network and increase passenger capacity.

Melbourne tram route 112 evolution
Dates	Route	Notes
18 December 1987 - August 2000	Port Melbourne to City	Infrequently used
7 August 2000 - 26 July 2014	West Preston to St Kilda	

== Route ==
=== Description ===
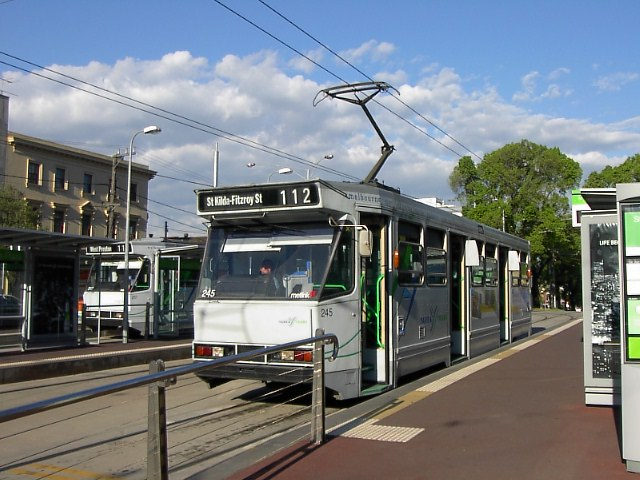
A class tram on route 112 at St Vincent's Plaza, October 2004.

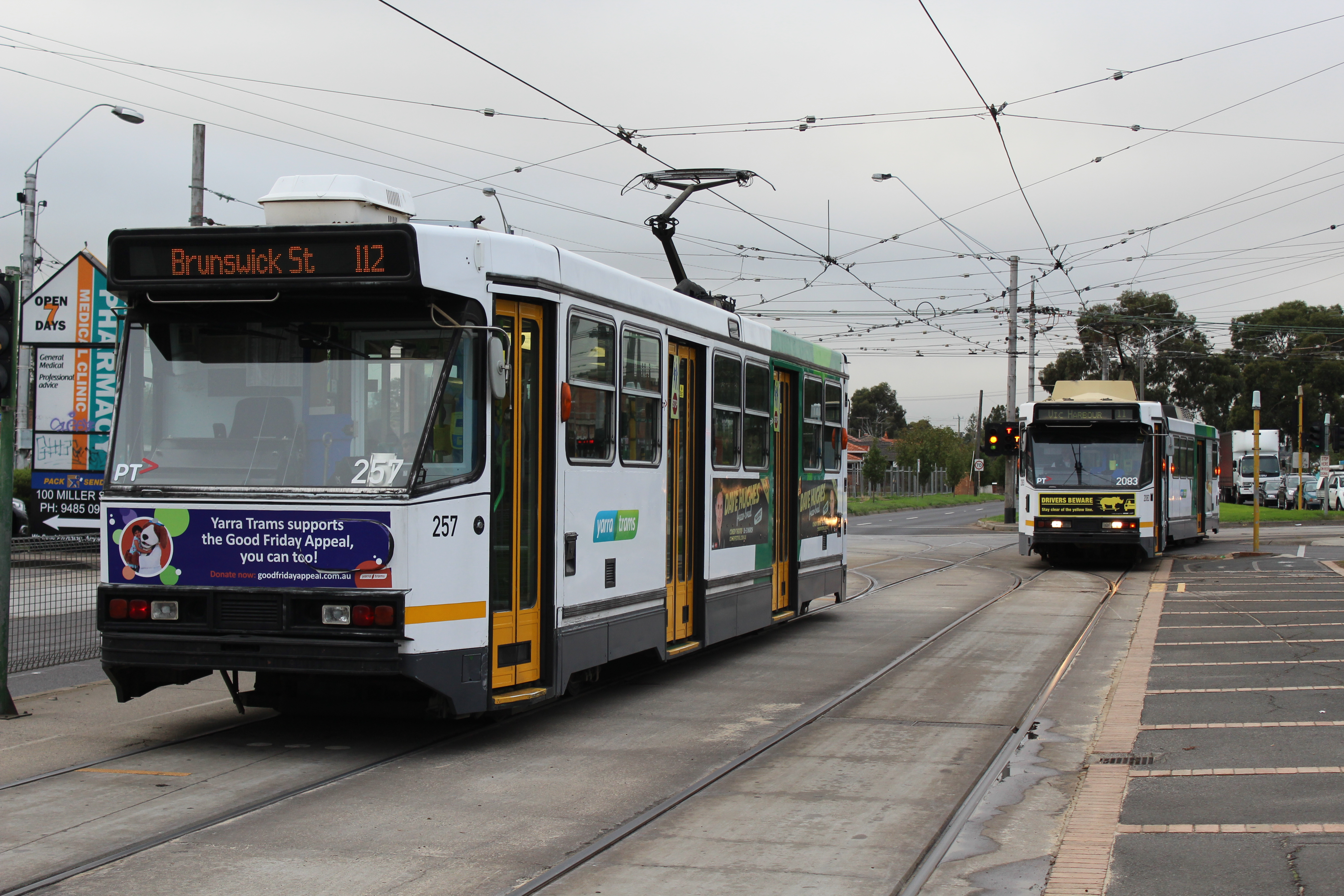
A1 257 on route 112 passing B2 2083 on route 11 on St Georges Road, April 2013.

Route 112 ran from West Preston south on Gilbert Road, turning east at Miller Street and south onto St Georges Road. It then traversed the suburbs of Thornbury, Northcote and Fitzroy North. At Edinburgh Gardens it turned into Brunswick Street and continued south into Fitzroy. It turn west into Victoria Parade, passing through St Vincent's Plaza, East Melbourne, St Vincent's Hospital, the Eye & Ear Hospital and then turned south onto Gisborne Street. It then continue south west along MacArthur Street and turned west into Collins Street, entering the CBD, passing Melbourne Town Hall and City Square.

It turned south from Collins Street into Spencer Street, passing Southern Cross station. It then crossed the Yarra River and entered Southbank on Clarendon Street where it traversed through South Melbourne. It turned south west at Albert Road, passing the Melbourne Sports & Aquatic Centre, it turned south-east briefly onto Canterbury Road, Albert Park and turned south-west into Mills Street, and finally south-east into Danks Street, Middle Park, Patterson Street and Park Street, where it continued and arrives at its terminus at Fitzroy Street, St Kilda.

== Operation ==
Route 112 was operated out of East Preston depot with A1, B1 class, B2 class and D2 class trams.
