= Melbourne tram route 31 =

Route 31
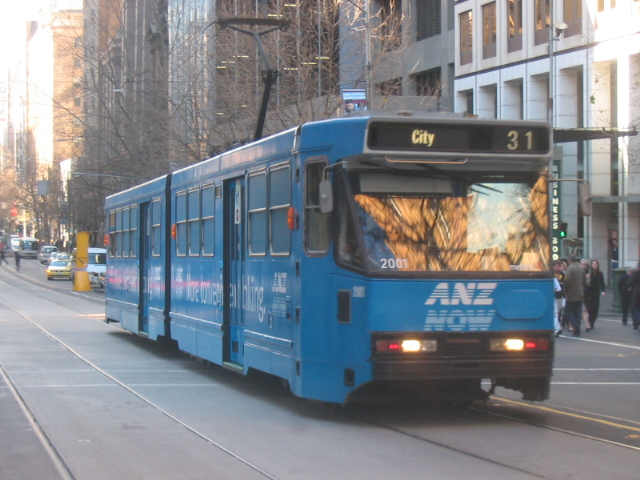

Overview
- System: Melbourne tramway network
- Operator: Yarra Trams
- Depot: Kew
- Began service: 25 October 2010
- Ended service: 25 July 2014

Route
- Start: Hoddle Street, Collingwood
- Via: East Melbourne; Melbourne CBD (Collins Street)
- End: Victoria Harbour

Service
- Operates: Weekdays
- Timetable: Route 31 timetable
- Map: Route 31 map

Melbourne tram route 31 was operated by Yarra Trams on the Melbourne tram network from Hoddle Street to Victoria Harbour. The route was designed as a supplementary service along Collins Street, with services running between peak hours with reduced services on weekends.

== History ==
The first version of route 31 ran from St Vincent's Plaza to the end of Collins Street at Spencer Street. On 18 November 2002, the route, along with peak-hour routes of 11 and 42, was extended via a new extension of Collins Street past Spencer Street station and terminated at Collins Street West End. From 28 June 2004 until 21 November 2005, the line was truncated back to Spencer Street while Spencer Street station (now Southern Cross station) was redeveloped.

With the rerouting of route 48 onto Collins Street in September 2009, route 31 ceased to run.

On 25 October 2010 an amended route 31 was reinstated, running from Hoddle Street, Collingwood to St Vincent's Plaza via Victoria Parade, then via Collins Street and continuing to Victoria Harbour (Merchant Street). The service ran on weekdays between the peak hours.

On 26 January 2014, the route was extended westwards by one more stop to terminate at the intersection of Collins Street and Bourke Street, which became the new Victoria Harbour terminus.

The route was discontinued on 25 July 2014 as part of a wider timetable change to the Yarra Trams network, replaced by a full-time routes 11, 12, 48 and 109 along Victoria Parade and Collins Street.
