= Melbourne tram route 12 =

Tram route in metropolitan Melbourne, Victoria, Australia

Route 12

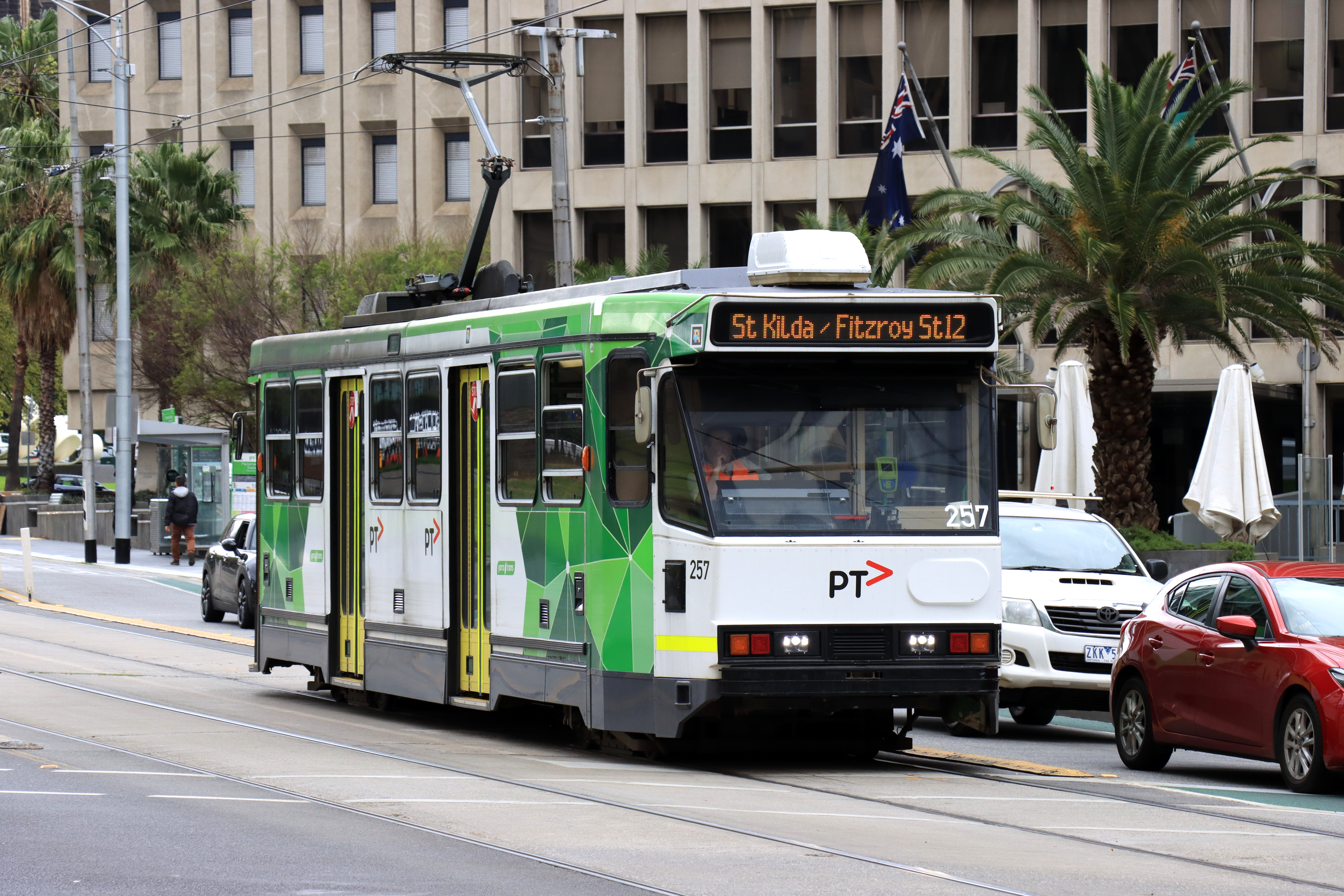
- A class tram A1.257 on MacArthur Street, September 2024

Overview
- System: Melbourne
- Operator: Yarra Trams
- Depot: Southbank
- Vehicle: A class
- Began service: 27 July 2014

Route
- Start: Victoria Gardens Shopping Centre
- Via: Victoria Street; Collins Street; South Melbourne
- End: St Kilda
- Length: 16.2 kilometres
- Timetable: Route 12 timetable
- Map: Route 12 map

Melbourne tram route 12 is operated by Yarra Trams on the Melbourne tram network from Victoria Gardens Shopping Centre to St Kilda. The 16.2-kilometre (10.1 mi) route is operated out of Southbank depot with A class trams and in the future G class trams.

== History ==
The origins of route 12 lie in several separate tram lines, including electrified 19th century cable tram lines and new track through South Melbourne constructed in the 1930.

The oldest section of track along Spencer Street between Collins Street and Flinders Street was part of Richmond cable tram line (Melbourne's first ever cable tram line), which opened on 11 November 1885 (and was electrified on 14 July 1927). The following year, Melbourne Tramway & Omnibus Company opened the North Fitzroy Line along Collins Street between Spencer Street (Stop 1) and St Vincent's Plaza (Stop 12) on 2 October 1886. It was electrified on 8 December 1929. The line east of St Vincent's Plaza along Victoria Street opened later that year as the Victoria Bridge line on 22 November 1886. This section was electrified on 15 September 1929.

Meanwhile, the southern section was created in many stages. It began with the South Melbourne cable tram line to South Melbourne Beach that came from Queensbridge Street and City Road, then ran along the Clarendon Street section of today's route 12 between City Road (Stop 126) and Park Street (South Melbourne, Stop 129), and then followed today's route 1 to South Melbourne beach, which was first opened on 17 June 1890. Next, an electric line between Park Street (South Melbourne) and St Kilda Beach (Fitzroy Street) was constructed by the Melbourne & Metropolitan Tramways Board, opening on 31 October 1925, with services running from Swanston Street to St Kilda Beach (Fitzroy Street) as routes 1 and 2. When the South Melbourne cable tram line was electrified on 25 July 1937, the section along Clarendon Street was electrified, and a new section extending along Clarendon Street up to Spencer Street was built, connecting Collins Street services which could now run through to South Melbourne or St Kilda. Route 12 was allocated to the line between South Melbourne Beach and a crossover on Collins Street at Gisborne Street, East Melbourne. Trams heading southwards from the city from Collins Street along Clarendon Street initially turned right at Park Street to terminate at South Melbourne Beach, while trams from Swanston St turned left and terminated at St Kilda Beach. On 13 September 1953, this was amended so that both tram services ran through the intersection of Park and Clarendon Street instead of both turning, resulting in St Kilda Beach becoming the terminus of route 12.

The original terminus of the St Kilda Beach service along Park Street diverted at Mary Street (Stop 142) and turned left at Beaconsfield Parade to meet the tracks at Fitzroy Street one block south of the current terminus. The junction was double-tracked so that some services would run further towards Luna Park. However, this rarely eventuated. The Mary Street tracks were replaced by the current day terminus at Park Street on 13 November 1959.

The first ever use of the route number 12 was for a about a year for the West Preston to St Kilda Beach service from 21 November 1929. At the time the North Fitzroy cable tram was yet to be electrified, and so all Preston services ran west via Holden Street and then via Lygon Street to Swanston Street, rather than Collins Street, and then to the southern suburbs. Then, when the cable line from St Georges Road to Collins Street was electrified on 27 October 1930, and services used Collins Street, route 12 was left unallocated for several years. For a long time, some route 12 services would continue northwards towards West Preston via Brunswick Street under Route 10. Eventually, the elimination of shared depot routes on 30 April 1995 led to route 10 becoming discontinued.

On 3 July 1973, a siding was constructed at Brunswick Street (later St Vincent's Plaza), which enabled route 12 to terminate there instead of the busy crossover at Gisborne Street.

In mid-2000, W-class trams were temporarily removed from service due to brake issues. As a result, on 7 August 2000, route 112 was introduced to replace routes 11 and 12 during weekdays, and route 12 became a weekend only service. It later became a peak hour only service. However, the peak-hour service was deemed unnecessary for the low-density and affluent suburbs in which it ran and on 18 November 2002, route 12 was discontinued.

The route number was then allocated as a short working for route 16 trams terminating at Malvern depot from 2004. On 27 July 2014, Yarra Tram's desire to discontinue all peak-hour services led to routes 24 and 112 being discontinued, and route 12 taking their place between Victoria Gardens and St Kilda.

During special events such as the Australian Open or the Australian Grand Prix, route 12 temporarily diverts via La Trobe Street and replaces route 30 which do not run during the events. The temporary diversion was also in place between 13 July and 7 November 2020, as part of a COVID-19 response plan to increase overall capacity in the city which introduced shuttle services of route 11.

Melbourne tram route 12 evolution
Dates	Route	Notes
During PMTT operation	Camberwell to St Kilda Road	via Burke and Malvern Roads
21 November 1929 - 26 October 1930	West Preston to St Kilda Beach	via Holden Street and South Melbourne
27 October 1930 - 24 July 1937	Unallocated	
25 July 1937 - 11 September 1953	South Melbourne Beach to City (Gisborne Street)	
12 September 1953 - 2 July 1973	St Kilda Beach to City (Gisborne Street)	
3 July 1973 - 17 November 2002	St Kilda Beach to City (Brunswick Street)	Became weekend-only following establishment of route 112 in August 2000
18 November 2002 - 17 October 2004	Unallocated	
18 October 2004 - 26 July 2014	Kew (Cotham Road) to Malvern depot	Rarely used short working of route 16
27 July 2014 - onwards	Victoria Gardens Shopping Centre to St Kilda (Fitzroy Street)	Became full-time route following cessation of route 112; Diverts via La Trobe Street during special events

== Operation ==
Route 12 is operated out of Southbank depot with A class trams, and will be operated with G class trams in the future as announced as part of the $76 million 2026/27 State Budget.

== Route map ==
Interactive map of Melbourne tram route 12.
