= St Vincent's Plaza tram stop =

Tram stop in Victoria, Australia

St Vincent's Plaza
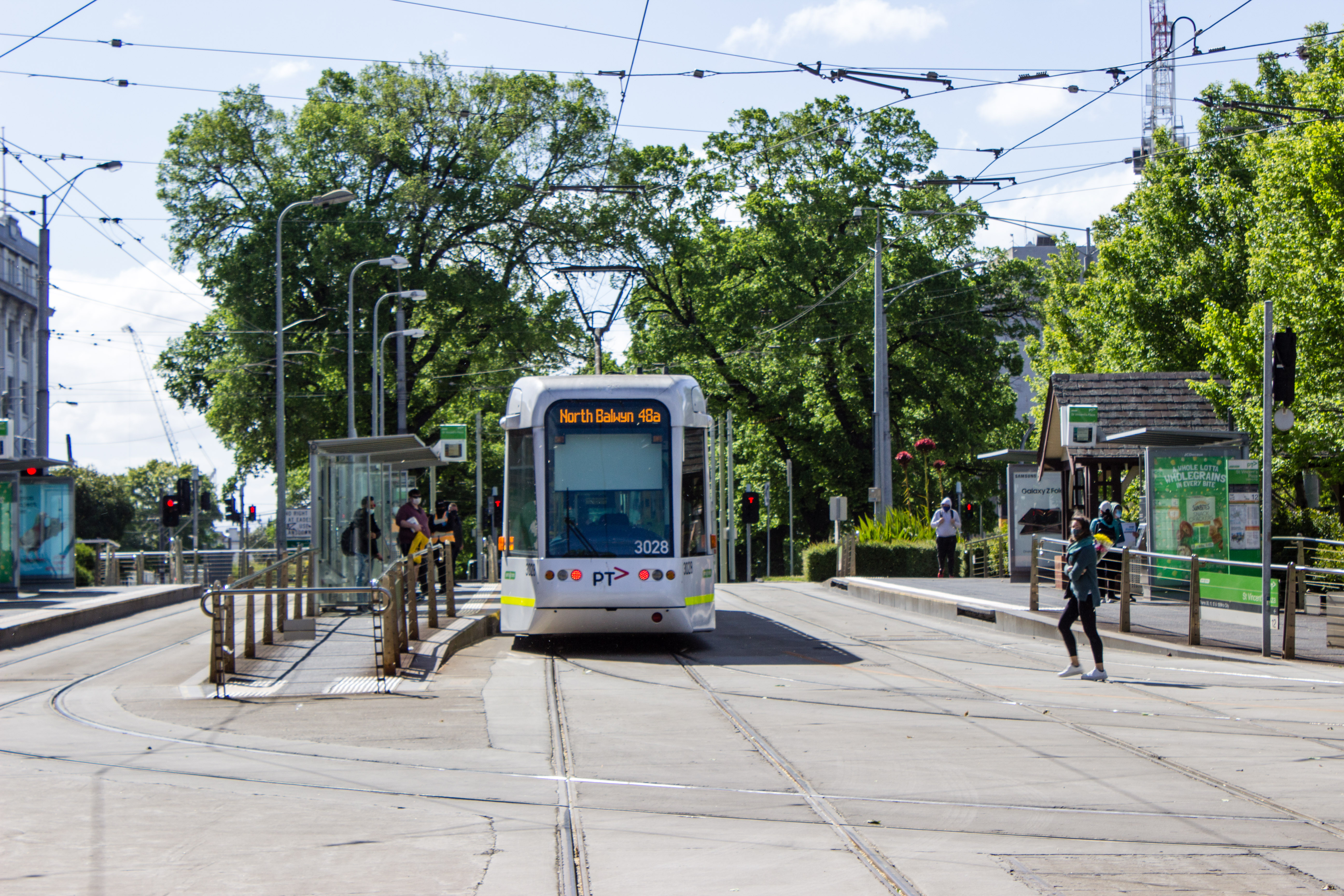
- St Vincent's Plaza tram stop in October 2020

General information
- Location: Victoria Parade, East Melbourne; Australia
- Coordinates: 37°48′29.80″S 144°58′34.08″E
- System: PTV tram stop
- Owner: VicTrack
- Operator: Yarra Trams
- Platforms: 3 side platforms
- Tram routes: Melbourne tram route 11 Melbourne tram route 12 Melbourne tram route 30 Melbourne tram route 109
- Connections: Bus

Construction
- Structure type: At grade
- Accessible: Yes

Other information
- Status: Operational
- Station code: 12
- Fare zone: Myki zone 1
- Website: Public Transport Victoria

History
- Opened: 24 July 2002
Services
Preceding station	Yarra Trams	Following station
Gertrude Street towards West Preston	Route 11	Albert Street towards Victoria Harbour Docklands
Lansdowne Street towards Victoria Gardens	Route 12	Albert Street towards St Kilda
Terminus	Route 30	Nicholson Street towards Central Pier, Docklands
Lansdowne Street towards Box Hill	Route 109	Albert Street towards Port Melbourne
Location

St Vincent's Plaza is a major interchange of the Melbourne tram network, serviced by Yarra Trams routes 11, 12, 30 and 109. It is located in the wide centre median of Victoria Parade, wedged between the intersections of Gisborne Street and Brunswick Street.

The interchange was one of Melbourne's first level access superstops to be constructed, opening on 24 July 2002 as part of the 'Tram 109' project. It is named after the adjacent St Vincent's Hospital. The previous tram stop at this location before the upgrade was known as the Brunswick Street Interchange or the City – Brunswick Street terminus for route 30, which continues to terminate at St Vincent's Plaza as of 2023.

== Routes ==
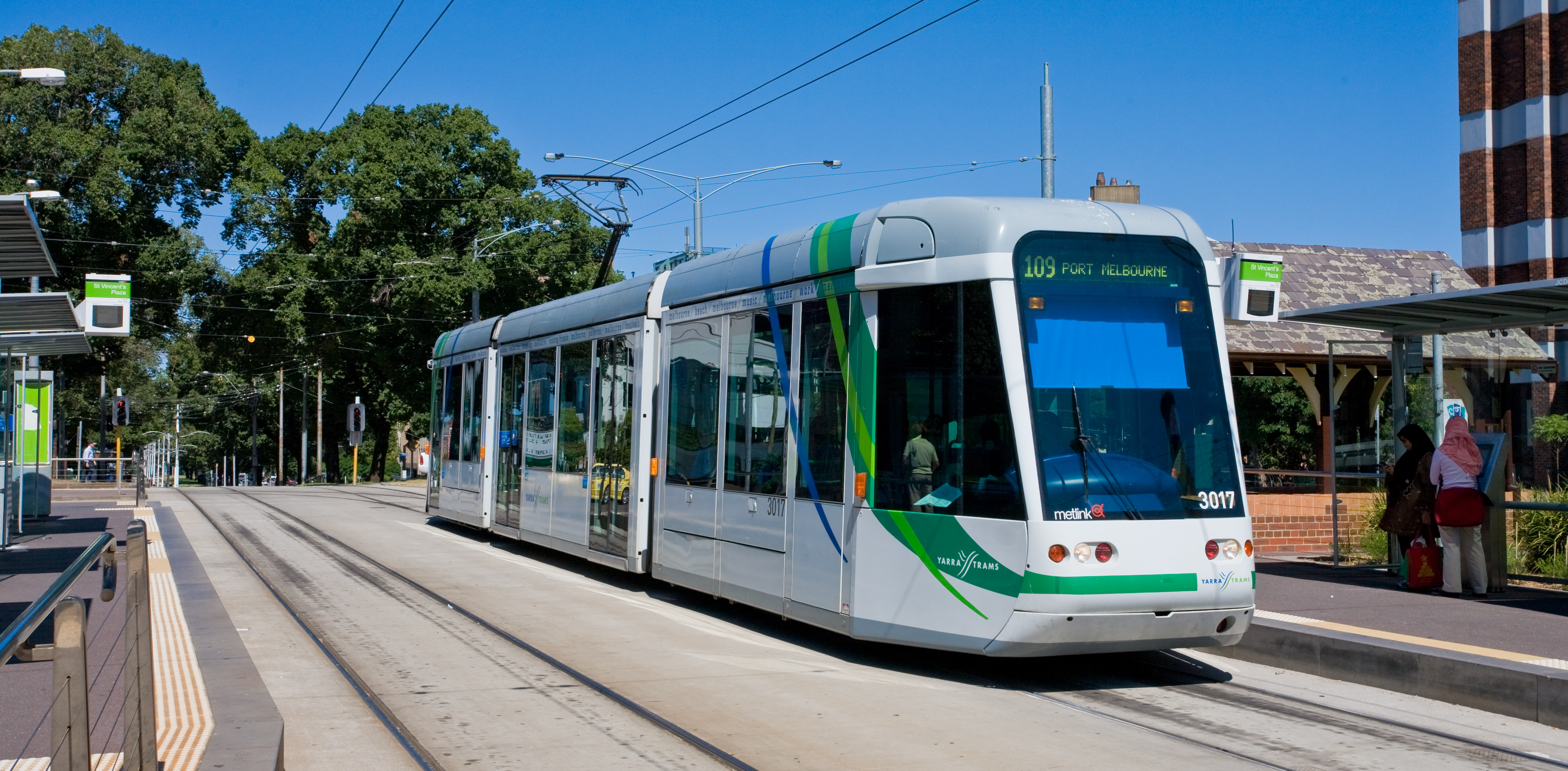
C-class tram on a route 109 service in January 2008

St Vincent's Plaza is utilised by four of Melbourne's tram routes:

- : West Preston to Victoria Harbour Docklands
- : Victoria Gardens to St Kilda
- : St Vincent's Plaza to Central Pier
- : Box Hill to Port Melbourne

It was previously serviced by discontinued routes 24, 31 and 112.

== Transport Links ==
Numerous bus services operate around St Vincent's Plaza.

Kinetic Melbourne operates eleven bus routes along Victoria Parade, under contract to Transport Victoria:

- 302 : City (Lonsdale Street) – Box Hill station
- 303 : City (Queen Street) – Ringwood North (peak hours only)
- 304 : City (Lonsdale Street) – Westfield Doncaster
- 305 : City (Lonsdale Street) – The Pines Shopping Centre (peak hours only)
- 309 : City (Queen Street) – The Pines Shopping Centre (peak hours only)
- 318 : City (Lonsdale Street) – Deep Creek, Doncaster East (peak hours only)
- 350 : City (Queen Street) – La Trobe University (Bundoora)
- SmartBus 905 : City (Lonsdale Street) – The Pines Shopping Centre
- SmartBus 906 : City (Lonsdale Street) – Warrandyte
- SmartBus 907 : City (Lonsdale Street) – Mitcham station
- SmartBus 908 : City (Lonsdale Street) – The Pines Shopping Centre (peak hours only)

Transit Systems Victoria operates one bus route along Victoria Parade, under contract to Transport Victoria:

- 402 : to Footscray station
