= Melbourne tram route 30 =

Tram route in metropolitan Melbourne, Victoria, Australia

Route 30

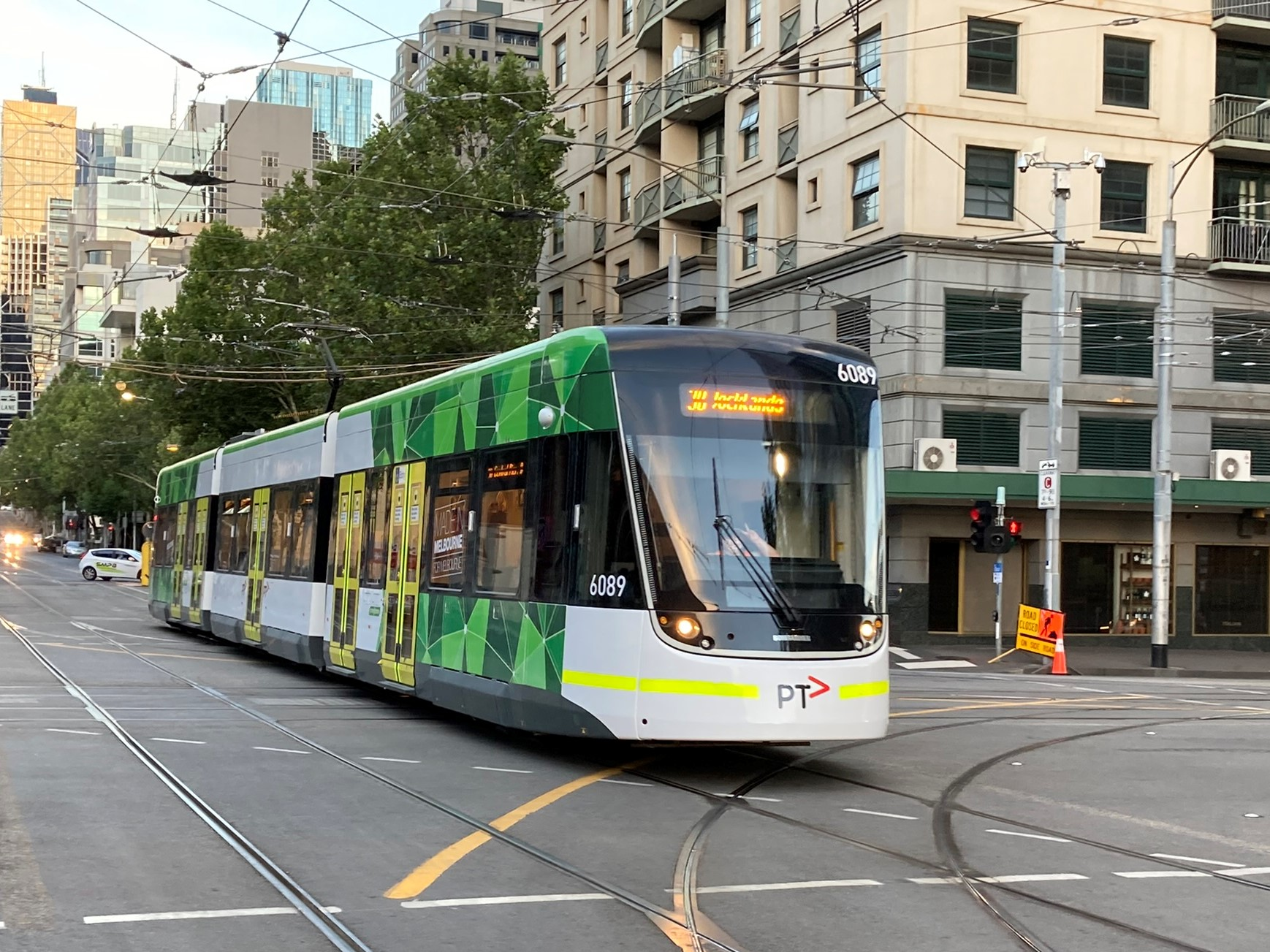
- E class tram on La Trobe Street, January 2022

Overview
- System: Melbourne tramway network
- Operator: Yarra Trams
- Depot: Southbank
- Vehicle: A class E class
- Began service: 25 September 1972

Route
- Start: St Vincent's Plaza
- Via: Victoria Street; La Trobe Street
- End: Central Pier
- Length: 2.9 kilometres
- Timetable: Route 30 timetable
- Map: Route 30 map

Melbourne tram route 30 is a tram route on the Melbourne tramway network serving the city of Melbourne in Victoria, Australia. Operated by Yarra Trams, the route is coloured violet and extends from St Vincent's Plaza to Central Pier over 2.9-kilometre (1.8 mi) of double track via Victoria Street and La Trobe Street. It is serviced out of Southbank depot utilising A and E class trams.

== History ==
The line along La Trobe Street between Spencer Street (Stop 1) and Brunswick Street (now St Vincent's Plaza) (Stop 12) was opened by the Melbourne & Metropolitan Tramways Board on 15 January 1951. Until 1972, trams running the La Trobe Street shuttle usually ran without numbers. Route 30 was first allocated to the line between City Spencer Street to via La Trobe Street on 25 September 1972. On 19 June 1973, a siding was installed just east of St Vincent's Plaza in order to allow route 12 and route 30 trams to shunt out of the way of through-running trams.

Most of the trams routes that ran via Brunswick Street or Victoria Parade also had peak-hour variants that would terminate at the La Trobe Street (for example route 23 and 24). For most of its operation, route 30 had never had a weekend or an evening service (services ending at 18:00).

In 1995, route 34 commenced operation between City (La Trobe Street) and East Melbourne, and operated during off-peak hours (10:00 to 15:30). Route 30 became peak-only following this point. Route 34 was discontinued from regular service on 19 September 2003, and replaced by new off-peak services of route 30 which began on 21 September 2003.

As part of the Docklands redevelopment project, tram tracks along La Trobe Street were extended west over the Spencer Street railyards in 2000. On 30 November 2003, the off-peak services of route 30 were extended via the La Trobe Street extension, Harbour Esplanade and Flinders Street before terminating at the Market Street intersection.

On 4 January 2005, off-peak services of route 30 were altered to terminate at Waterfront City along Harbour Esplanade and Docklands Drive, with the opening of the Docklands Drive tram extension. Peak hour services continued to terminate at Spencer Street.

Between May and November 2005, all route 30 peak hour services were temporarily extended and terminated at Waterfront City, to replace a truncated section of route 48 between Central Pier and Waterfront City. During this time, the latter temporarily terminated at Market Street due to the closure and removal of the Flinders Street Overpass over King Street. The temporary arrangement ceased with the completion of works in November 2005.

On 28 July 2008, route 30 swapped termini with route 86, with all peak and off-peak services terminating in Harbour Esplanade at Central Pier, while route 86 was extended to Waterfront City.

On 1 January 2019, the operation of route 30 was extended to evenings and weekends for the first time.

During special events such as the Australian Open or the Australian Grand Prix, route 30 does not operate. Instead, route 12 temporarily diverts via La Trobe Street and replaces route 30. The temporary cessation of route 30 and diversion of route 12 was also in place between 13 July and 7 November 2020, as part of a COVID-19 response plan to increase overall capacity in the city which introduced shuttle services of route 11. When route 30 recommenced operations on 8 November 2020, E class trams commenced operation on the route.

Melbourne tram route 30 evolution
| Dates | Route | Notes |
|---|---|---|
| 25 September 1972 – 29 November 2003 | City (La Trobe Street) to City (Brunswick Street) | Route operated without number prior to 1972, never an evening service Off-peak services commenced 21 September 2003 |
| 30 November 2003 – 3 January 2005 | City (Flinders and Market Streets) to St Vincent's Plaza | Via Docklands; No evening or weekend services. Peak hour services operate between La Trobe Street and St Vincent's Plaza |
| 4 January 2005 – 27 July 2008 | Waterfront City to St Vincent's Plaza | No evening or weekend services. Peak hour services operate between La Trobe Street and St Vincent's Plaza (except between 22 May and 20 November 2005) |
| 28 July 2008 – onwards | Central Pier to St Vincent's Plaza | No evening or weekend services until 2019; Does not run during special events, replaced by a diverted route 12 |

== Route ==
Interactive map of Melbourne tram route 30.

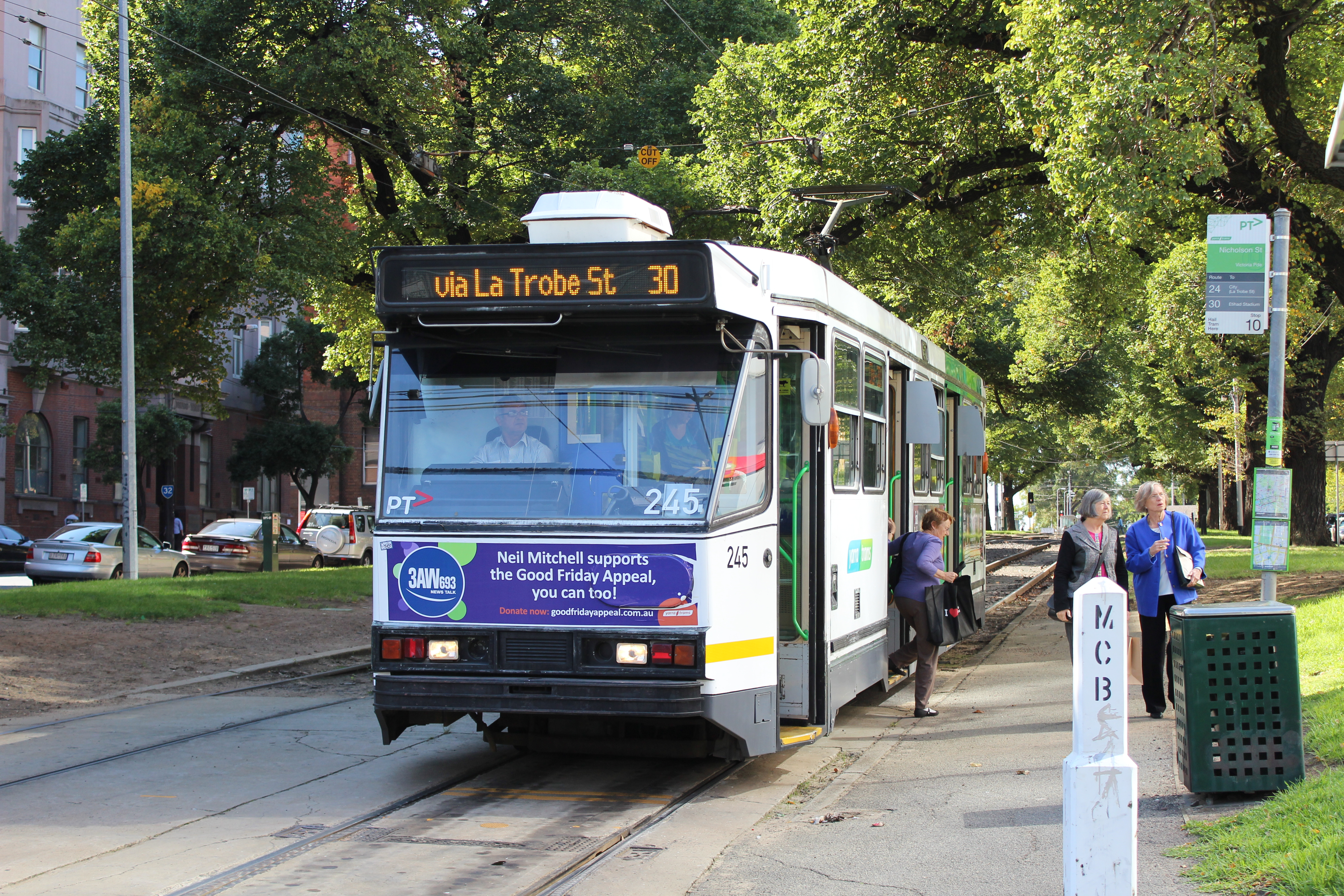
A class tram on Victoria Parade on route 30 in April 2013

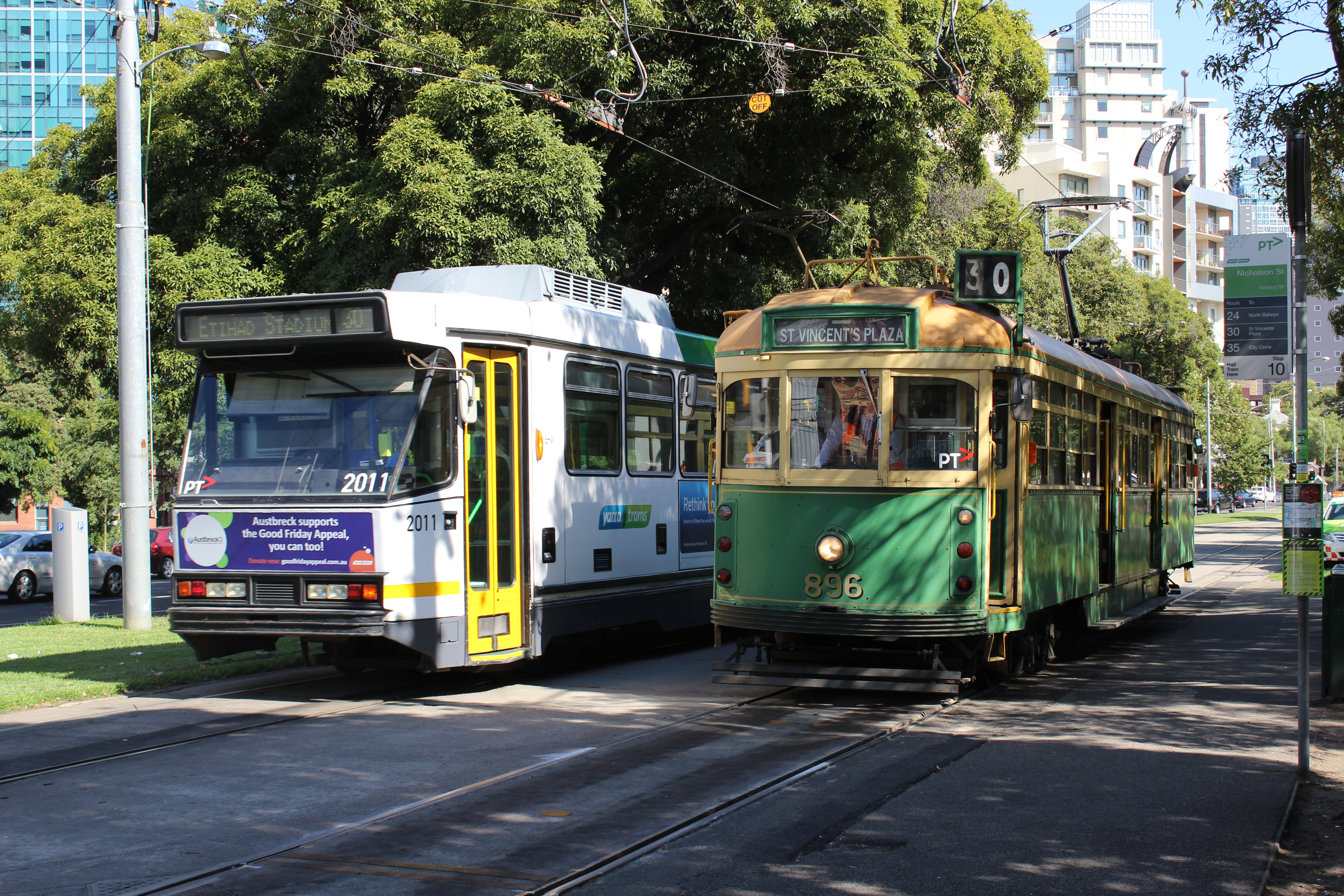
B class and W class trams on route 30 in April 2013

Route 30 runs from the St Vincent's Plaza, East Melbourne west on Victoria Parade then via La Trobe Street to Central Pier.

== Operation ==
Route 30 is operated out of Southbank depot with E class trams. In September 2003 operation of the route was transferred from Kew depot to Southbank. It was operated by W class trams until 23 December 2014. Until January 2019, Route 30 was the only tram route on the network that neither operated at night nor on weekends. The A class tram very occasionally runs on the route 30.
