= Think Tram =

Melbourne tram network program

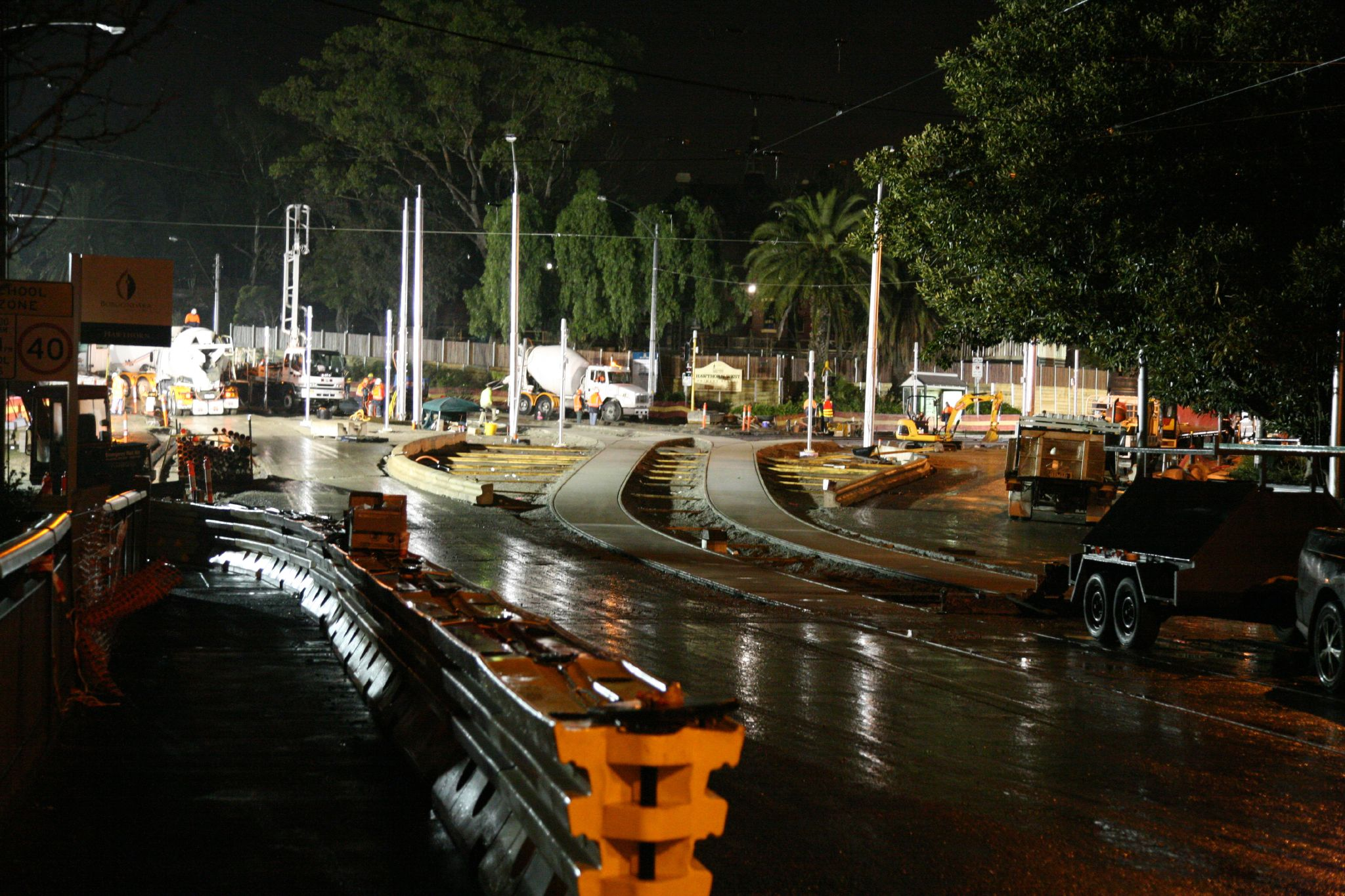
- A superstop being built in Hawthorn, 2006

Overview
- Locale: Melbourne, Victoria, Australia

History
- Work began: 2003; 23 years ago

Think Tram was a Victorian Government program aimed at improving the Melbourne tram network in the 2000s. It was introduced with the intention of reducing tavel time, improving service reliability and improving accessibility. The program was run by VicRoads, in partnership with Yarra Trams and Public Transport Victoria (PTV).

== Types of treatment ==
=== Superstops ===
Superstops are wheelchair-accessible platform stops, with rain shelters, seating, and real time arrival displays. Superstops, when served by low-floor trams, comply with the Disability Discrimination Act 1992. In general, introduction of superstops along a route has been accompanied by a reduction in the total number of stops and relocation of existing stops.

=== Traffic light priority ===
Traffic lights are switched in favour of approaching trams before (or as soon as possible after) a tram stops at an intersection. Right turning traffic may also be given priority to clear the path of the tram.

=== Separation kerbing and right turn bans ===
Yellow separation strips and/or signage are introduced to prevent turning cars from blocking the progress of trams. Right-turn bans and hook turns have been introduced at certain intersections.

== Targeted routes ==
- Swanston Street / St Kilda Road
- Route 19 (Royal Parade / Sydney Road)
- Bridge Road (Routes 48 and 75)
- Route 55 (Queensbridge Street, William Street, Peel Street, Flemington Road)
- Route 59 (Peel Street, Flemington Road)
- Route 86 (Bourke Street, Gertrude Street, Smith Street, High Street, Plenty Road)
- Route 109 (Collins Street, Spencer Street, Victoria Parade)
- Route 112 (Clarendon Street, Brunswick Street, St Georges Road)

== Criticism ==
While many tram users have welcomed the new Superstops, there has also been complaints at the reduction in the number of stops and the introduction of new mid-block stops. A "funeral", coordinated by the Public Transport Users Association, was held for the tram stops being closed, featuring a procession with coffin from the former tram stops to the Transport Minister's office. Despite these protests, the program continued.

During a trial of a number of Think Tram treatments in Clarendon Street, South Melbourne, traders complained about the reduction in parking availability. They successfully lobbied to have the departure-side stops returned to their old arrival-side configuration, although the introduced hook turns were kept.
