= Melbourne tram route 11 =

Tram route in metropolitan Melbourne, Victoria, Australia

Route 11

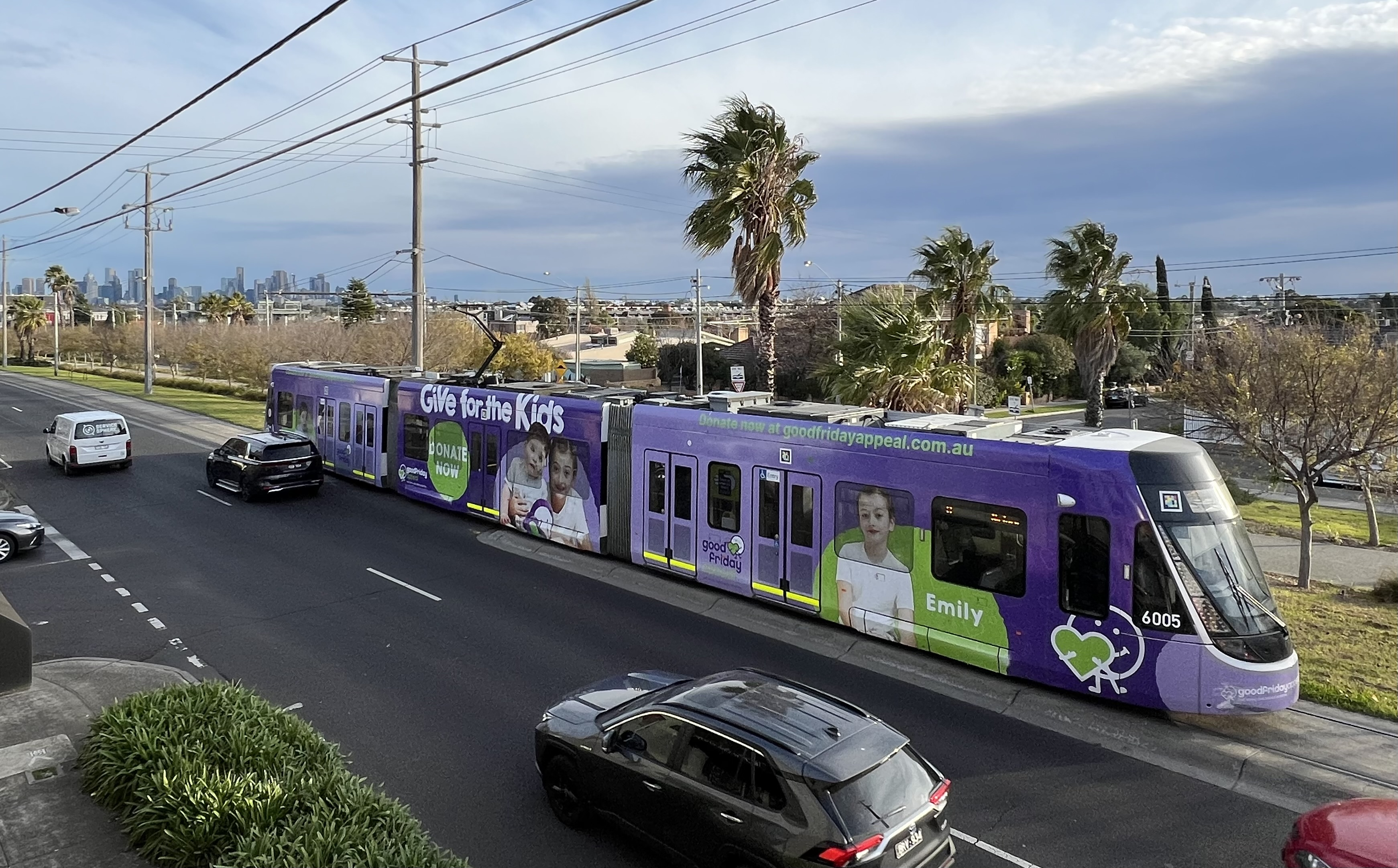
- E class tram with Good Friday Appeal livery, southbound on St Georges Road, June 2024

Overview
- System: Melbourne
- Operator: Yarra Trams
- Depot: Preston
- Vehicle: E class

Route
- Start: West Preston
- Via: St Georges Road; Fitzroy; Collins Street
- End: Victoria Harbour
- Length: 13.4 kilometres
- Timetable: Route 11 timetable
- Map: Route 11 map

Melbourne tram route 11 is a tram route on the Melbourne tramway network serving the city of Melbourne in Victoria, Australia. Operated by Yarra Trams, the route is coloured turquoise green and extends from West Preston to Victoria Harbour over 13.4-kilometre (8.3 mi) of double track via St Georges Road, Fitzroy and Collins Street. It is serviced out of Preston depot utilising E class trams.

== History ==
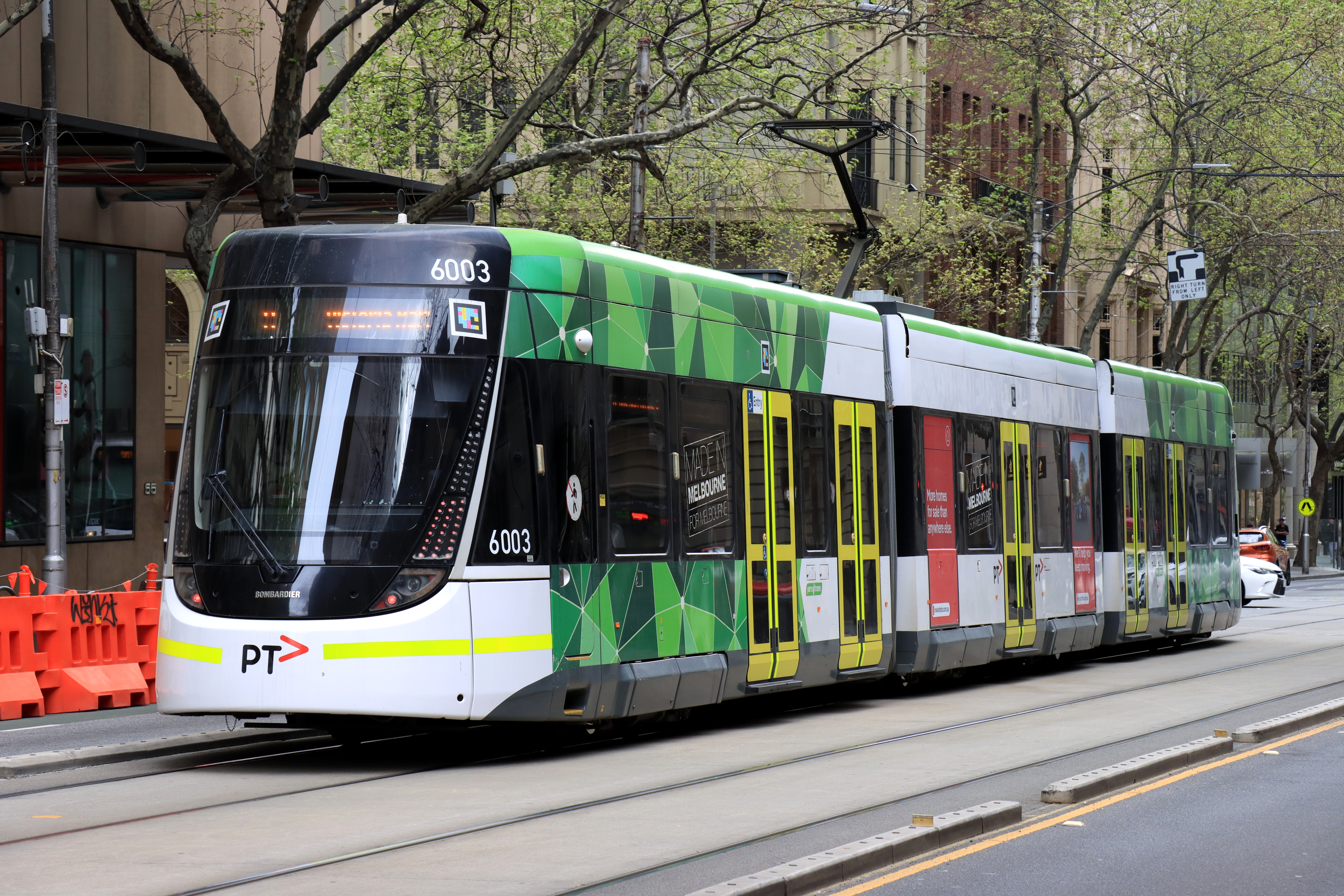
E class tram #6003 in PTV livery running a Route 11 service to Victoria Harbour Docklands on Collins Street at Exhibition Street, Melbourne

Route 11 was first allocated to the line between West Preston and the City (Collins Street) on 25 July 1937. Prior to this, it was first allocated to East Preston and St Kilda Beach via Holden Street and Swanston Street on 21 November 1929. Then, it was allocated to the Holden Street Shuttle following the electrification of the Brunswick Street cable line. However, since single-truck trams without number boxes were used on this line, the route number was never displayed. The electrification of the South Melbourne cable tram line on 25 July 1937 enabled through-running on Collins Street. Route 11 ran from West Preston to the city, but some services would continue as route 10 south to South Melbourne Beach (later St Kilda - Fitzroy Street).

Following the elimination of shared-depot routes, route 10 was discontinued on 30 April 1995. However, in August 2000, the West Preston to St Kilda - Fitzroy Street recommenced and was allocated route 112, which operated on weekdays. Following this, Route 11 became a weekend only service, and later became a peak-hour only service. On 27 July 2014, route 11 became a full-time service following the cessation of route 112, and the establishment of route 12.

The origin of route 11 mainly consists of the North Fitzroy cable tram line and the West Preston line built by the Fitzroy, Northcote & Preston Tramways Trust (FNPTT). The North Fitzroy cable line was opened on 2 October 1886 by the Melbourne Tramway & Omnibus Company. The section between Spencer Street (Stop 1) and St Vincent's Plaza (Stop 12) was first electrified on 15 September 1929. The rest of the North Fitzroy cable line was electrified on 26 October 1930. Meanwhile, the FNPTT constructed the line between Holden Street (Stop 24) and Regent Street (Stop 47). Due to delays with available FNPTT rollingstock among other issues, the line couldn't open until the Melbourne & Metropolitan Tramways Board took over. The line eventually opened on 1 April 1920. On 3 July 1953, the West Preston terminus was extended to the north side of the intersection to clear the intersection.

Initially, the line to West Preston was single track north of the Miller Street/St Georges Road intersection (near Stop 34). It was duplicated in stages. On 28 June 1927, the line from Gilbert Road (near Stop 37) and Preston Workshops was duplicated. A few months later on 22 August 1927, this was further extended to Bell Street (Stop 40). It was further duplicated to Jacka Street (Stop 45) on 28 March 1928. The last remaining section of single track to the Regent Street terminus was duplicated on 19 November 1952.

On 18 November 2002, a tram line was constructed to Collins Street West along the Collins Street extension, and routes 11, 31 and 42 were extended to the end of the extension. From 28 June 2004 until 21 November 2005, the line was truncated back to Spencer Street while Spencer Street station (now Southern Cross station) was redeveloped. It was extended further along the Collins Street extension to Victoria Harbour (Merchant Street) on 21 September 2009. It was extended a further 450 metres west to the corner of Collins and Bourke Streets on 26 January 2014, which is today's Victoria Harbour terminus.

Melbourne tram route 11 evolution
Dates	Route	Notes
During PMTT operation	Grange Road to Elsternwick	
21 November 1929 - 26 October 1930	East Preston (Tyler Street) to St Kilda Beach	via Holden Street and South Melbourne
27 October 1930 - c. 1937	Lygon Street to St Georges Road (via Holden Street)	Operated without number after 11 was reallocated
25 July 1937 - 17 November 2002	West Preston to City (Collins Street)	Became weekend only following establishment of route 112 in August 2000, and later peak-hour only
18 November 2002 - 18 September 2009	West Preston to City (Collins Street West)	Peak-hour only
21 September 2009 - 25 January 2014	West Preston to Victoria Harbour (Collins / Merchant Streets)	Peak-hour only
26 January 2014 - onwards	West Preston to Victoria Harbour (Collins / Bourke Streets)	Initially peak-hour only. Became full-time route following cessation of route 112 from 27 July 2014

== Operation ==
In 2015, E class trams operated out of Preston depot began to replace A class and B class trams that were operated out of East Preston depot.

== Route map ==
Interactive map of Melbourne tram route 11.
