= Spencer Street Bridge =

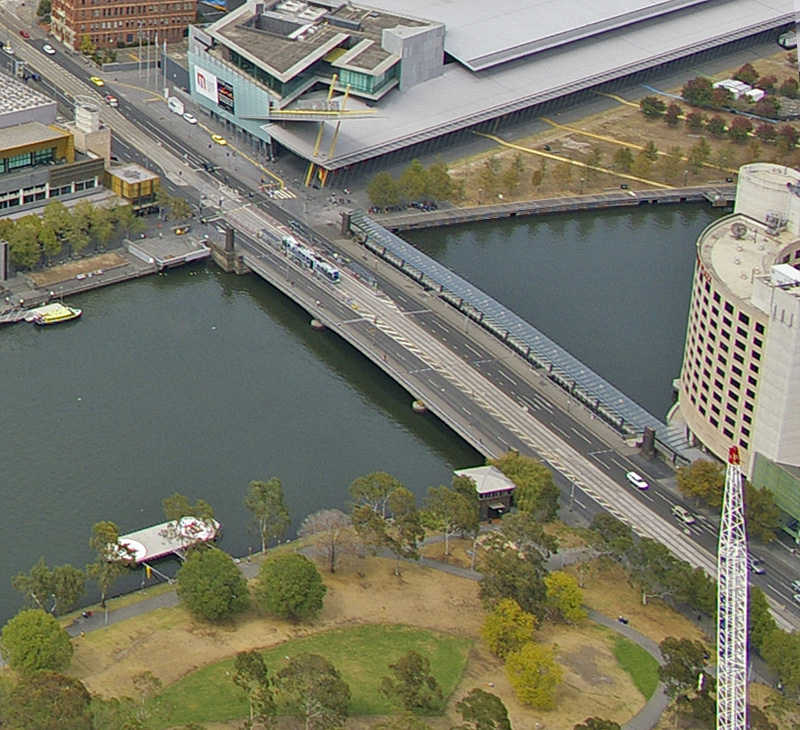
- Coordinates: 37.822942°S 144.955893°E
- Carries: Road, trams, pedestrians
- Crosses: Yarra River
- Locale: Melbourne, Australia

Characteristics
- Material: All steel superstructure
- Total length: 405 ft (123 m)
- Width: 80.6 ft (24.6 m) Roadway; 12 ft (3.7 m) footways
- Height: 28.5 ft (8.7 m)
- Longest span: 130 ft (40 m)
- No. of spans: 3
- Piers in water: Concrete on cylindrical caissons faced with bluestone down to rock

History
- Architect: Royal Victorian Institute of Architects; Mr Oakley; Mr Kermode; Mr Perrin
- Engineering design by: Mr W. D. Chapman
- Constructed by: Railways Construction Branch
- Construction start: 28 October 1927
- Construction end: 1930
- Construction cost: £168,700

The Spencer Street Bridge is a road and tram bridge over the Yarra River in Melbourne, Australia. It connects Spencer Street on the north bank with Clarendon Street on the south. The idea of a bridge at that point was first proposed in the mid-19th century.

The design of the bridge was the result of a public competition, announced in November 1925. It was won by Messrs. Edward Saunders and Alan Wilson, engineers, in conjunction with Messrs. Alfred R. La Gerche and W. E. Gower, architects. The first pile was driven in October 1927.

During construction engineers knew deep foundations would be required to find bedrock but, at 20 metres below sea level, they struck a red gum stump that took three weeks work to remove. It was dated at about 8,000 years old and appeared to have lived for well over 400 years. The cantilever girder type, with steel girder suspended span bridge was completed in 1930, with an adjacent glass and steel covered footbridge built alongside in 1998, as part of the Melbourne Convention & Exhibition Centre.

== Gallery ==
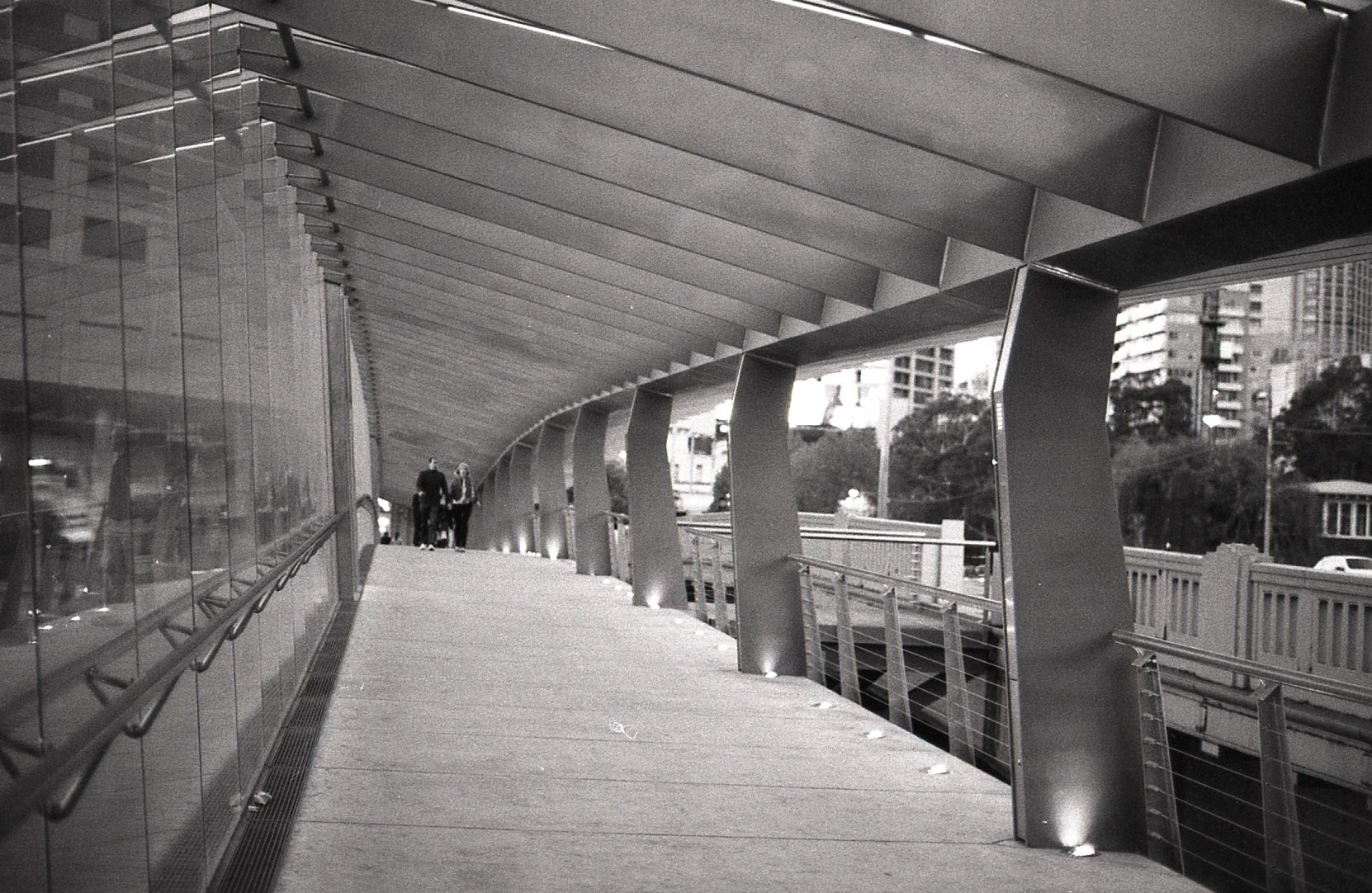
The parallel glass and steel footbridge

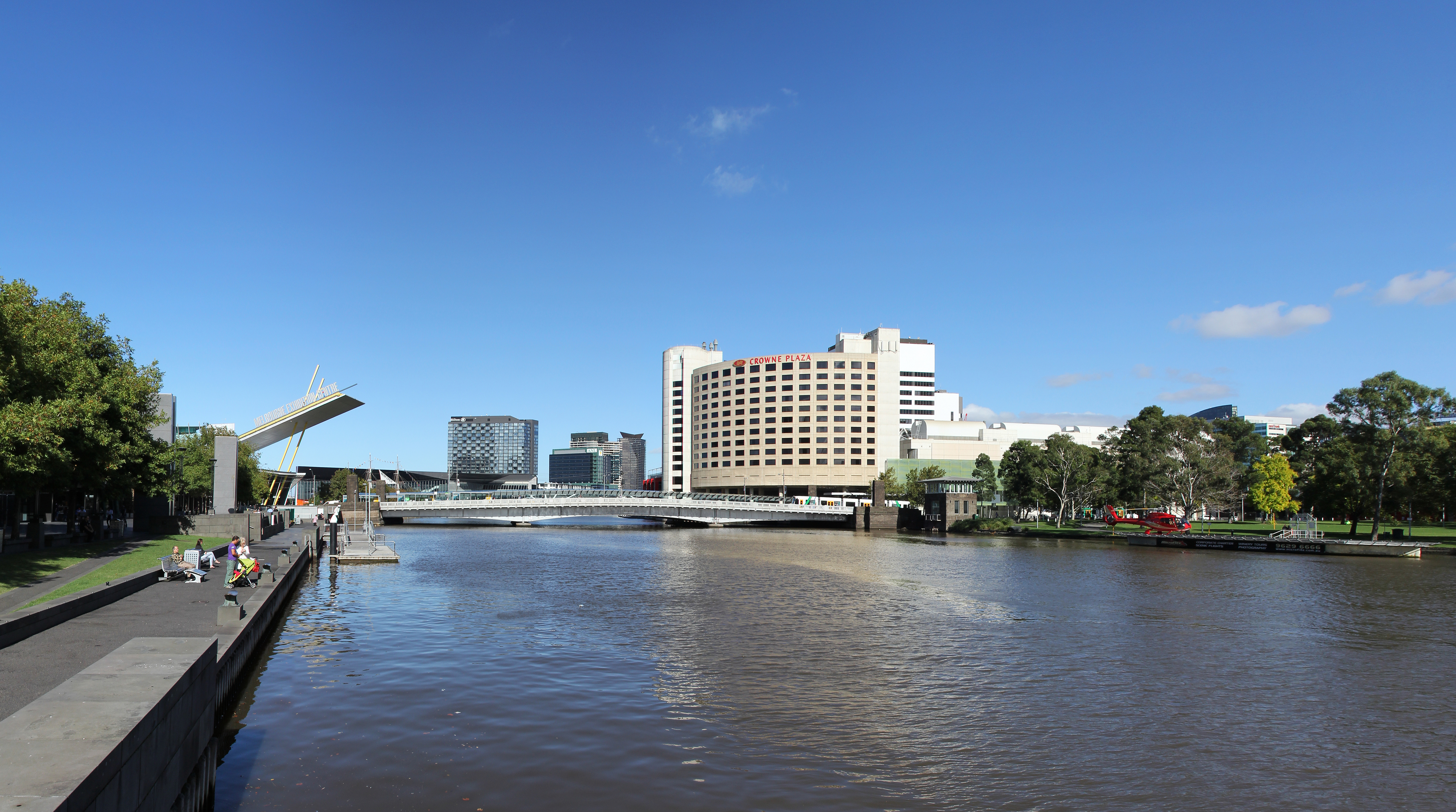
Yarra River & Spencer Street Bridge

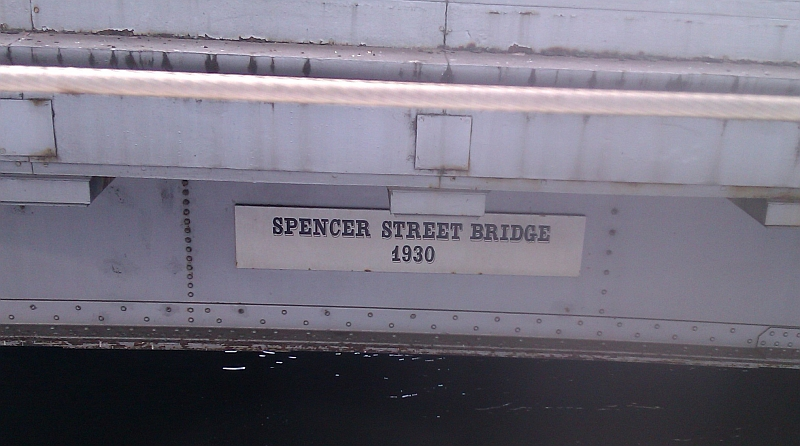
Spencer Street Bridge 1930 Plaque
