= Victoria Street, Melbourne =

Road in Melbourne, Victoria

Victoria Street Victoria Parade Victoria
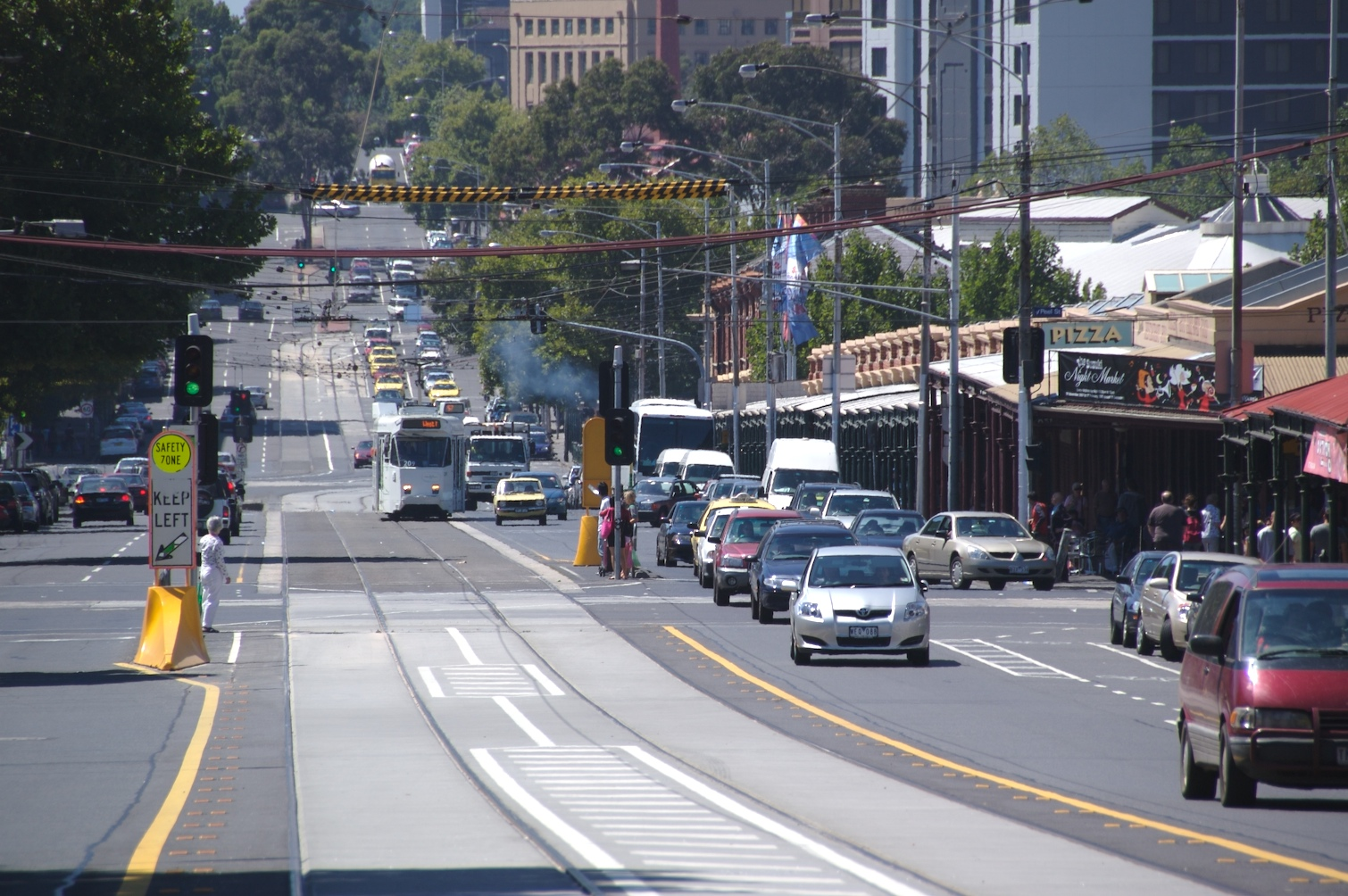
- Looking east along Victoria Street, past the Queen Victoria Market, from the Capel Street intersection, North Melbourne, February 2008
- Coordinates: 37.804370°S 144.942080°E (West end); 37.812141°S 145.015390°E (East end)

General information
- Type: Road
- Length: 6.5 km (4.0 mi)
- Opened: 1900s
- Route number(s): Metro Route 32 (1965–present) (North Melbourne–Kew)

Major junctions
- West end: Hawke Street; West Melbourne
- Munster Terrace; Anderson Street; Peel Street; Elizabeth Street; Swanston Street; Lygon Street; Russell Street; Rathdowne Street; Exhibition Street; La Trobe Street; Nicholson Street; Brunswick Street; Lansdowne Street; Smith Street; Hoddle Street; Church Street; Burnley Street
- East end: Barkers Road; Kew, Melbourne

Location(s)
- LGA(s): City of Melbourne; City of Yarra
- Major suburbs: West Melbourne, North Melbourne, Carlton, Fitzroy, East Melbourne, Collingwood, Richmond, Abbotsford

Victoria Street is one of the major thoroughfares of inner Melbourne, running east–west for over six kilometres between Munster Terrace in North Melbourne and the Yarra River. The road is known as Victoria Parade for over one-and-a-half kilometres of its length (between the prominent intersections of Spring Street and Hoddle Street), distinguishable with a wide reservation and tramway down the middle.

Victoria Street touches the north-east corner of the Hoddle Grid at the intersection of La Trobe Street and Spring Street, opposite the Carlton Gardens. After crossing the Yarra river over Victoria Bridge the street continues as Barkers Road.

The road is well known for being an arterial road for cross-city traffic and for featuring the Queen Victoria Market, Victoria Parade hospital precinct and Melbourne's Little Saigon.

== Surroundings ==
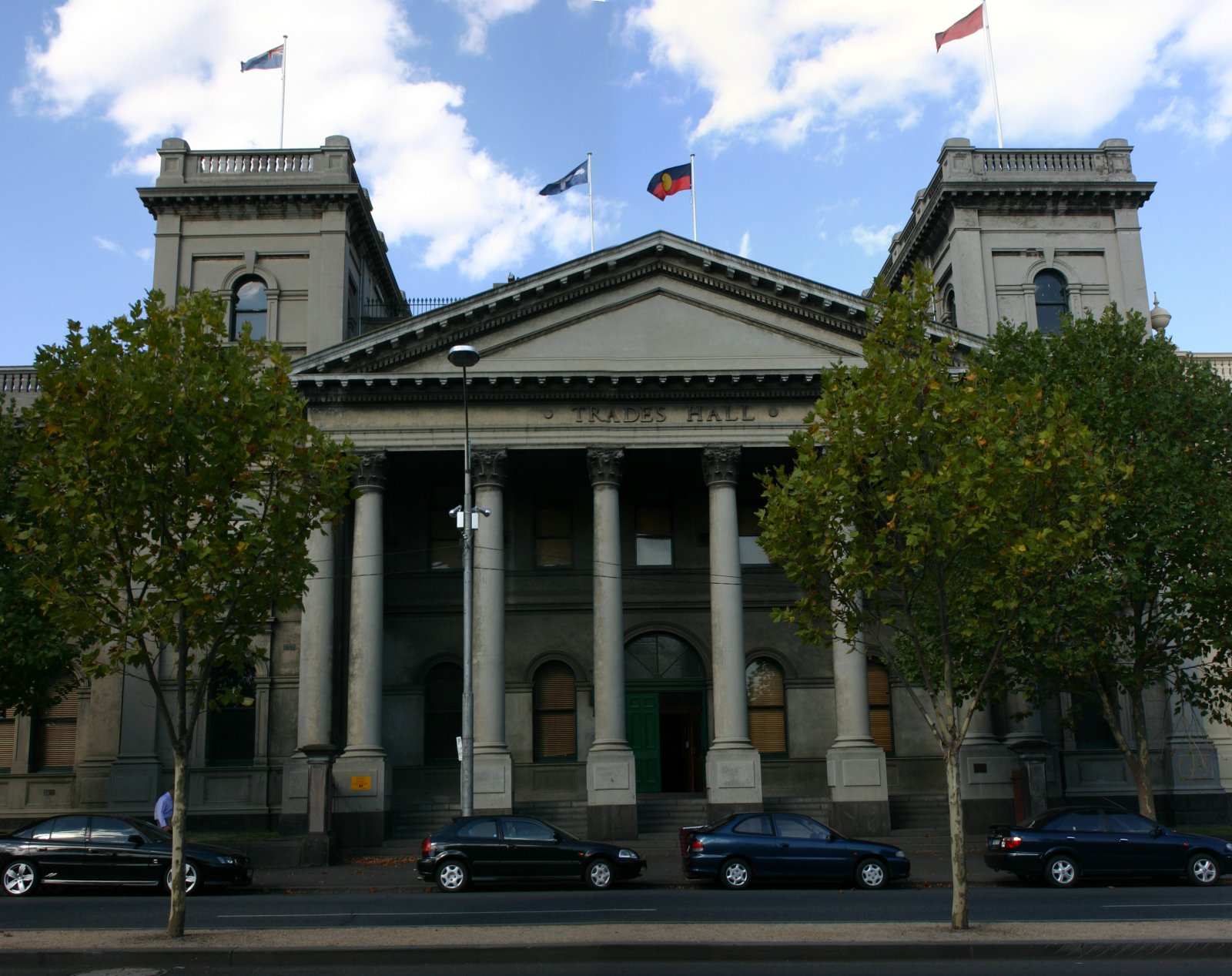
The Victorian Trades Hall is located on Victoria Street

Victoria Street forms a part of the borders of several inner Melbourne suburbs, including West Melbourne, North Melbourne, Melbourne, Carlton, East Melbourne, Fitzroy, Collingwood, Richmond and Abbotsford.

In addition to the Carlton Gardens, several other Melbourne landmarks are located on Victoria Street, including RMIT University, the Royal Exhibition Building, St Vincent's Hospital, Queen Victoria Market, the Eastern Hill Fire Station, the Victorian Trades Hall and Victoria Gardens Shopping Centre.

The Richmond and Abbotsford stretch of Victoria Street is amongst Melbourne's most well known restaurant strips, hosting many Vietnamese eateries and grocery stores. Before its relocation to Westgarth, the Valhalla Cinema was also located in Victoria Street, Richmond.

== History ==
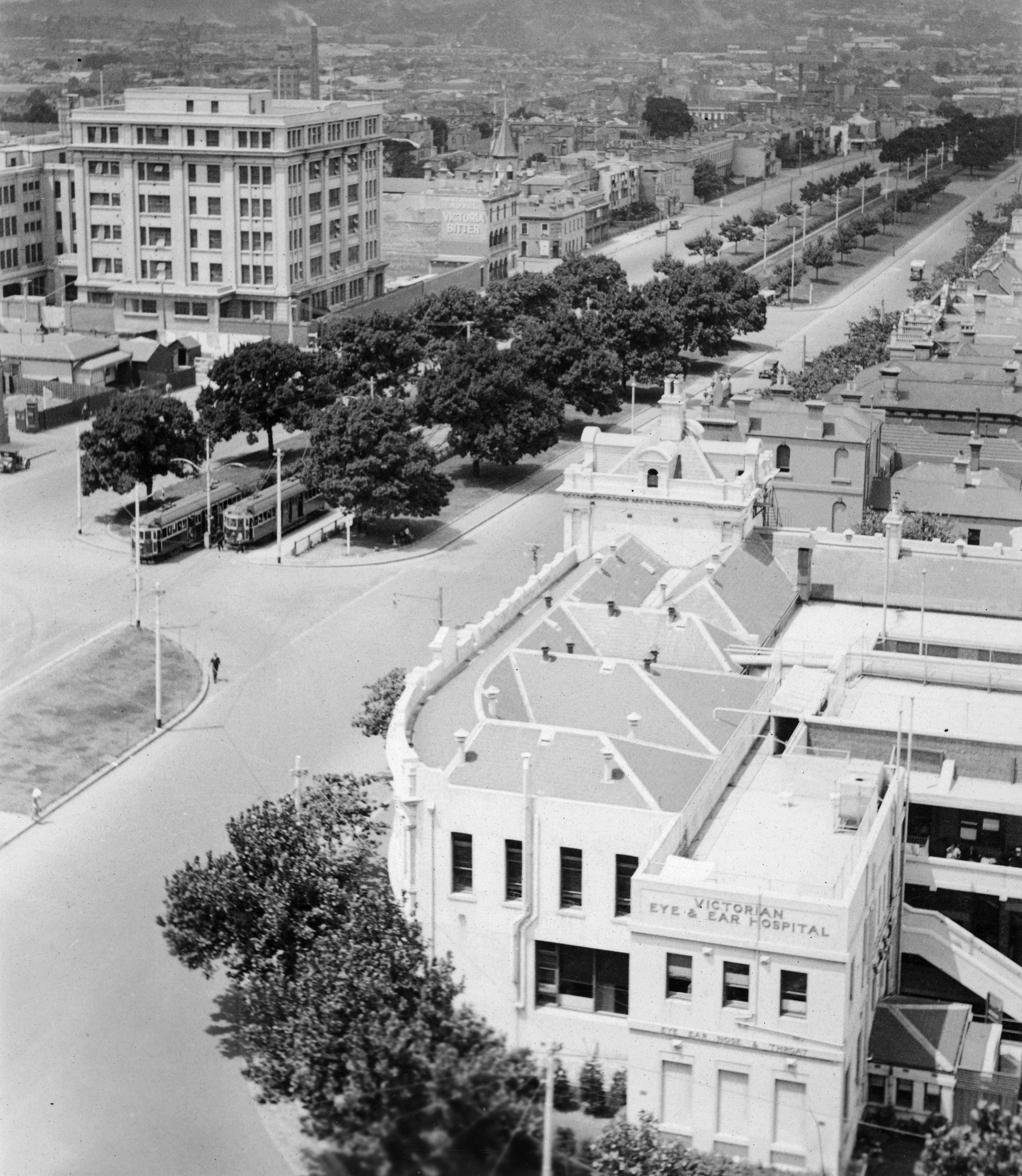
Victoria Parade, Fitzroy in 1935

=== Founding and naming ===
Victoria Street was reserved as a government road in 1839. The road was originally called Simpson's Road after a magistrate who constructed a small footpath and road in 1843. The street was renamed Victoria Street in the 1850s in honour of Queen Victoria's popularity and her namesake colony. Though not part of the original Hoddle Grid, it was included as a thoroughfare in Hoddle's Mile extension.

The street originally formed the boundary between the former cities (now suburbs) of Collingwood and Richmond, and as such did not feature many grand or civic buildings, though it does now feature numerous properties on the Victorian Heritage Register. The western end of the street became a shopping centre for present-day Abbotsford and North Richmond in the 19th century, lined by predominantly double-storey terrace shops. The eastern end of the street was an industrial area comprising engineering factories and wool scouring industry.

=== Growth and Subdivision ===
During the economic boom in the 1880s many of the buildings along Victoria Street were reconstructed and in 1884, the bridge over the Yarra River was built. This stimulated the subdivision of land at the end of Victoria Street and made it more easily accessible than by using the former ferry service between the river banks. In 1886 a cable car tram line was installed at the eastern end of the street. This was subsequently converted into an electric tramway in 1929.

During the middle of the 20th century the importance of the street declined, however the area has been revitalised in more recent years as the shopping and community focus for some of Melbourne's South-East Asian migrants.

=== Little Saigon ===
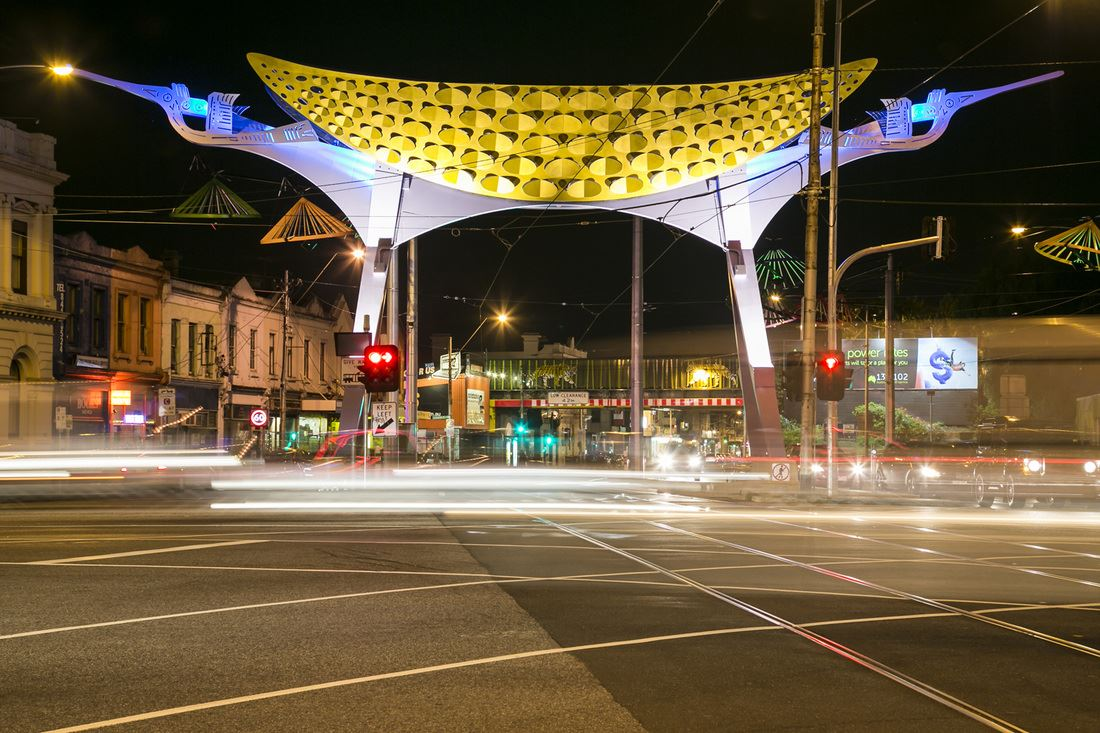
The Victoria Street Gateway erected to recognise the cultural contribution of Vietnamese refugees

The eastern stretch of Victoria Street (between Hoddle and Burnley Streets) is known colloquially as 'Little Saigon' or 'Little Vietnam'. This is due to the influx of migrants to the surrounding area following the Vietnam War, and the subsequent development of Vietnamese businesses during the 1980s. This stretch of Victoria Street has become famous as an Asian grocery and restaurant precinct with Japanese, Korean and Thai options alongside the longer-standing Vietnamese establishments.

On 16 January 2014, a culturally-themed gateway was installed at the intersection of Victoria Street and Hoddle Street to recognise "the cultural contributions that have established Victoria Street's reputation as a bustling and diverse retail and dining strip."

A Lunar Festival celebrating Tết, the Vietnamese New Year festival of the Lunar calendar, has been held in the Little Saigon stretch of Victoria Street since 1994. The street is closed to traffic and many food and culture stalls, live performances and events line the section of road between Hoddle Street and Church Street.

=== Road classification ===
Victoria Street (and Victoria Parade) was signed as Metropolitan Route 32 between Carlton and Kew in 1965, diverging from Victoria Parade to run through the city along Latrobe, Adderley and Dudley Streets to Docklands. It was re-routed to run further west along Victoria Street, turning south and west along Peel and Dudley Streets to Docklands instead in 1989.

The passing of the Road Management Act 2004 granted the responsibility of overall management and development of Victoria's major arterial roads to VicRoads: in 2004, VicRoads re-declared the road as Victoria Street (Arterial #5082), between Dryburgh and King Streets in North Melbourne and between Peel Street in North Melbourne and Nicholson Street in Carlton, as Victoria Parade (Arterial #5083) between Nicholson Street in Carlton and Hoddle Street at Abbotsford, and as Victoria Street (Arterial #5948), beginning at Hoddle Street at Abbotsford and ending at Barkers Road in Richmond.

== Transport ==
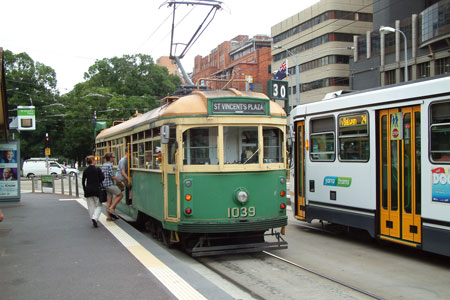
Route 30 tram at St Vincent's Plaza on Victoria Parade

Victoria Street is serviced extensively by public transport, with St Vincent's Plaza acting as an interchange stop for most tram and bus routes that run along the street. Several tram routes run along portions of Victoria Street and Victoria Parade's length, including the 11, 12, 30, 57 and 109.

Kinetic Melbourne bus routes connecting the Melbourne central business district to its Eastern suburbs also run along Victoria Parade for parts of their journeys, primarily between Spring Street and Hoddle Street. Transit Systems Victoria bus route 402 to Footscray also terminates on Victoria Street at the Carlton Gardens.

North Richmond railway station lies on Victoria Street in the Eastern Suburb of Richmond at the corner of Regent Street. It is close by the Hoddle Street intersection, Little Saigon and a connected tram stop. Though no other railway stations are located on Victoria Street itself, North Melbourne railway station is near its western end.
