= Victoria Gardens Shopping Centre =

Coordinates: 37°48′46″S 145°0′40″E

Victoria Gardens
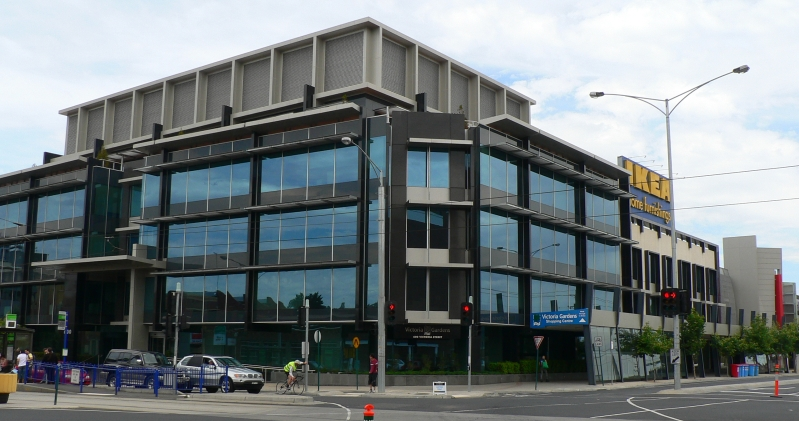
- Location: Richmond, Victoria, Australia
- Opened: 3 April 2003; 23 years ago
- Developer: Vicinity Centres
- Manager: Vicinity Centres
- Owner: Centro Wholesale (50%), Salta (50%)
- Num. of stores: 75
- Num. of anchor tenants: 11
- Floor area: 37,699 m^{2} (405,790 sq ft)
- Floors: 2 of stores and 5 of car parking
- Parking: 2,173
- Website: www.vicgardenssc.com.au

Victoria Gardens is a shopping centre located in Richmond, Victoria, Australia approximately 4 kilometres (2.5 mi) east of Melbourne's central business district. It is located on the corner of Victoria and Burnley Streets, Richmond at the eastern end of the Richmond commercial, retail and residential precinct. The shopping centre has a Gross Lettable Area of 37,699 m^{2} (405,790 sq ft), 2,173 parking spaces and approximately 80 specialty retailers.

== History ==
Victoria Gardens was officially opened on 3 April 2003. It occupies the site of the former Vickers Ruwolt engineering works which manufactured large industrial components and was the location of some iconic photography by Wolfgang Sievers. The site was an undeveloped "bomb site" for nearly 20 years prior to the construction of the centre. Victoria Gardens shopping centre is part of the greater Victoria Gardens Precinct Development a joint venture by Salta Properties and Vicinity Centres.

== Anchors ==
There are several major stores anchored in the centre, most notably an IKEA furniture store. Other major anchors include Coles and Kmart, while mini majors include Freedom, Rebel Sport, JB Hi-Fi and Chemist Warehouse. The centre also comprises a large food court to go along with a Hoyts cinema complex and a fresh food market located near Coles.

== Transport ==
Victoria Gardens is accessible by tram route 12 (which terminates there) and route 109.
