= La Trobe Street =

Street in Melbourne, Victoria

Coordinates: 37.8114°S 144.9577°E

La Trobe Street Latrobe Street Victoria
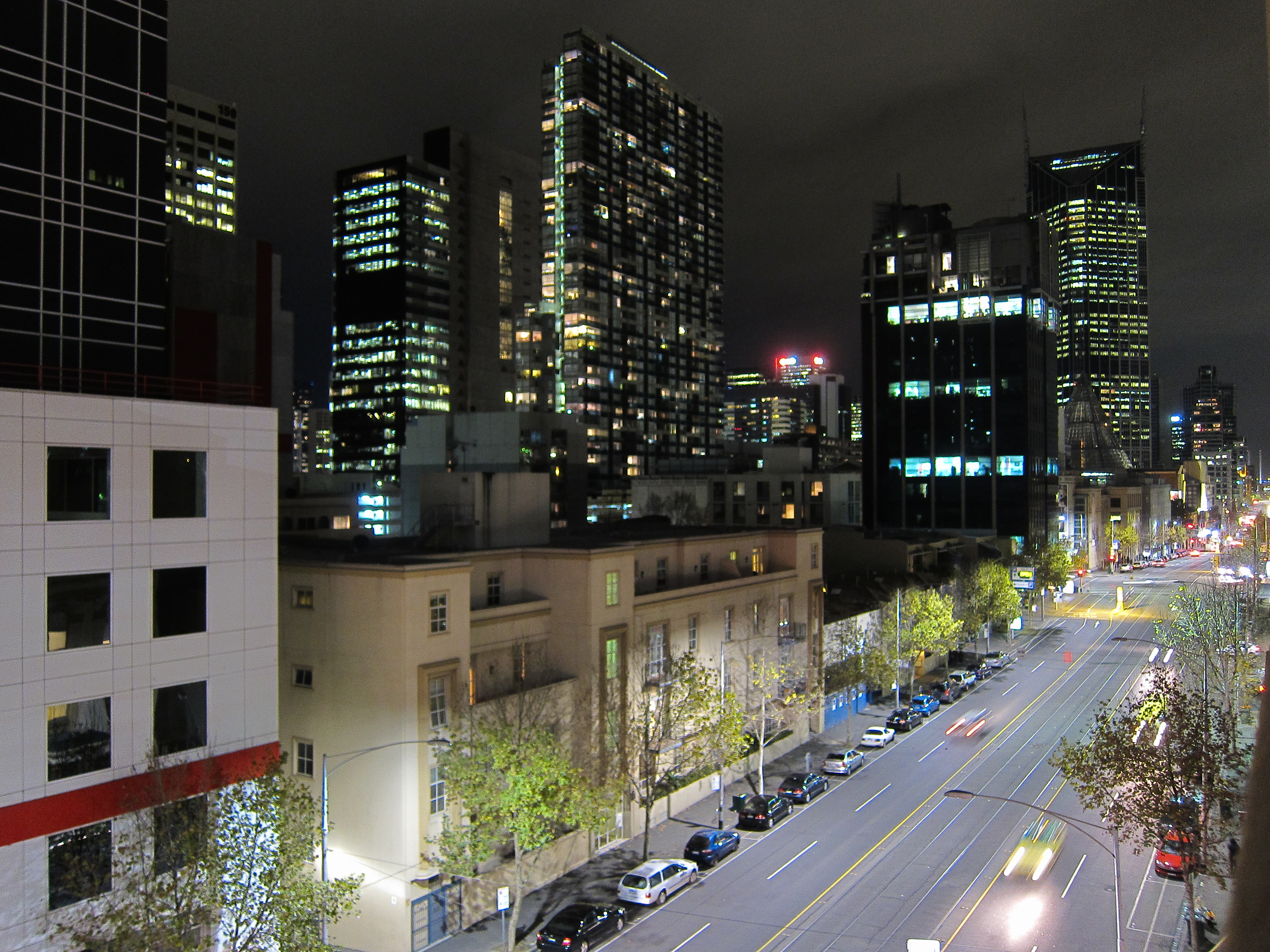
- La Trobe Street at night, June 2010

General information
- Type: Street
- Length: 2.4 km (1.5 mi)
- Opened: 1839
- Former route number: State Route 32 (1965–1989)

Major junctions
- West end: Harbour Esplanade; Docklands, Melbourne
- Adderley Street; Spencer Street; King Street; William Street; Queen Street; Elizabeth Street; Swanston Street; Russell Street; Exhibition Street
- East end: Victoria Street; Carlton, Melbourne

Location(s)
- Suburb(s): Docklands, Melbourne CBD

La Trobe Street (also Latrobe Street) is a major street and thoroughfare in the Melbourne central business district, Victoria, Australia. It runs roughly east–west and forms the northern boundary of the central business district. The street was laid out as an extension of the original Hoddle Grid in 1839 and was named after Charles La Trobe. La Trobe Street extends from Victoria Street in the east to Harbour Esplanade in the west.

== Location ==
La Trobe Street is home to a number of precincts and public and private spaces. The Carlton Gardens lie at the eastern end of the street, and the western end terminates at Victoria Harbour in the Docklands. Before Docklands was developed, La Trobe street terminated just beyond its intersection with Spencer Street. In 2000 the La Trobe Street Bridge opened to connect the street through to Docklands, and tram lines were also extended accordingly.

The Flagstaff Gardens are located at the corner of La Trobe and King Streets.

== Notable buildings ==
Numerous notable buildings and structures on La Trobe Street are listed on the Victorian Heritage Register and/or classified by the National Trust of Australia. These include:

=== Victorian Heritage Register ===
- Argus Building (NMIT)*
- Cast Iron Public Urinal (adjacent to Melbourne Magistrates' Court)*
- Francis Ormond Building (RMIT)*
- Flagstaff Gardens*
- Foresters' Hall*
- Royal Society of Victoria*
- St David's Welsh Church*
- William Angliss College*
- Royal Mint (Former)*
- State Library of Victoria*

*Also classified by the National Trust

=== National Trust ===
- Burton Livery and Bait Stables
- E W Tilley Building
- Statue of Francis Ormond (artist Percival Ball)

=== Other notable buildings ===
- Docklands Stadium
- Melbourne Central Shopping Centre
- Family Court complex
- RMIT University complex
- Aurora Melbourne Central

In recent years there has been controversy over the number of proposed demolitions for unlisted heritage buildings, including:

- 488 La Trobe Street, a Victorian-era workshop built in 1882 (set to be demolished to for a new apartment tower)
- 48 La Trobe Street, a coach factory built in 1862 and added to in 1887 (demolished for a small shopping plaza and laneway access)

== Transport ==
Two underground railway stations lie beneath La Trobe Street, with Flagstaff station toward the west and Melbourne Central nearer the centre. Two of Melbourne's tram routes travel along La Trobe Street. These are the route 30 and the City Circle tram.
