= Acland Street =

Road in Melbourne, Australia

Acland Street Victoria
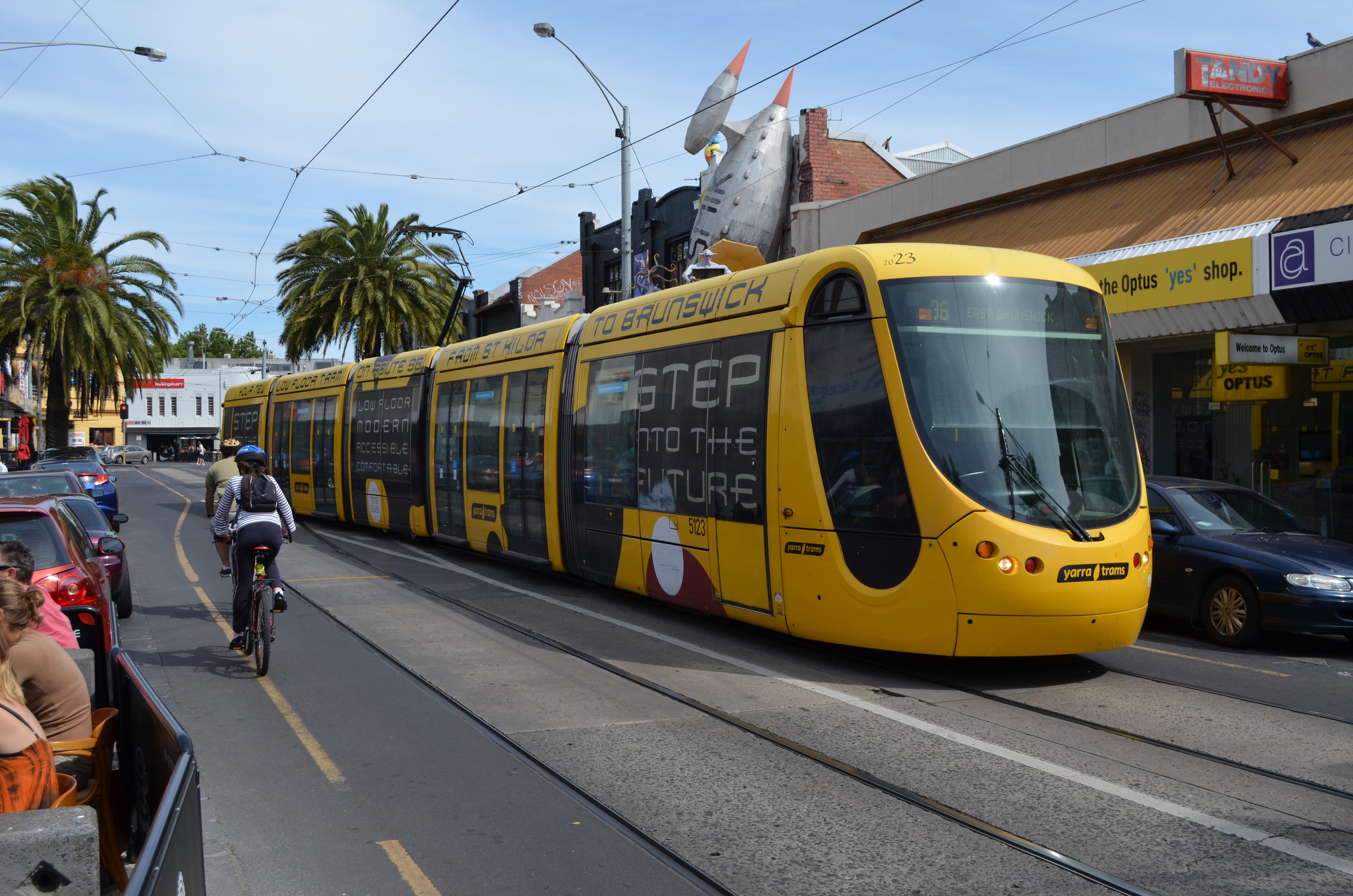
- A route 96 tram departs from the Acland Street terminus
- Coordinates: 37.861000°S 144.972635°E (Northwest end); 37.869640°S 144.980751°E (Southeast end)

General information
- Type: Street
- Length: 1.2 km (0.7 mi)

Major junctions
- Northwest end: Beaconsfield Parade; St Kilda, Melbourne
- Fitzroy Street; Carlisle Street
- Southeast end: Barkly Street; St Kilda, Melbourne

Location(s)
- LGA(s): City of Port Phillip
- Suburb(s): St Kilda

Acland Street is a street in the Melbourne suburb of St Kilda, which enjoys great popularity as a recreational area, mainly due to its many restaurants and its proximity to the entertainment areas along St Kilda beach

== Route ==
Acland Street runs on a north-west to south-east axis between Fitzroy and Barkly Streets. It was one of the first streets laid out when St Kilda was surveyed in 1842.

The north-west end of the street is largely residential, and features many fine houses from the late 19th century, some of them converted to flats or other uses, such as the Linden Gallery, and earlier, Acland Street Gallery, which was at number 18, and closed in 1990. The south-east end of the street, between Carlisle and Barkly Streets, is a commercial strip. The section of Acland Street between Barkly Street and Carlisle Street is a tram zone where route 96 terminates.

== History ==
Acland Street is named for Sir Thomas Dyke Acland, who owned the schooner Lady of St Kilda between 1834 and 1840. The street was named by James Ross Lawrence, who had been master of the vessel until 1842.

Lawrence was the buyer of the first block at the first sale of Crown lands in St Kilda, which took place on 7 December 1842. The block was bounded by three unmade roads, one of which he named Acland Street after Thomas Acland, who had been his employer until 1840 but who had never been to Port Phillip District. The other two roads became Fitzroy Street and The Esplanade. (A plaque at the junction of Acland and Fitzroy Streets marks the site of the block.) By the 1880s, what is now the commercial end of the street was residential, with a string of large houses in large gardens, similar to the rest of the street. As St Kilda evolved into a playground for the masses in the early 20th century, with electric tram lines running to the front of Luna Park and down this end of Acland Street, the mansions and gardens were replaced with shops in the 1920s and 30s. By the 1930s these shops had become of the centres of Melbourne's Jewish community, which grew greatly in size with European refugees before and after World War II, and Acland Street featured a number of shops and restaurants catering to this community. In the 1968, the Balberyszski bookshop moved into Acland Street, staying on till the 1990s. The Scheherezade cafe, established in 1958, was the most representative and popular part of this heritage, and served up borscht and latkes for decades. A number of cake shops specialising in Central and East European fare such as Kugelhopf and Black Forest Cake were also established in this period. By the 1980s, the centre of Jewish Melbourne had moved eastwards to more affluent Caulfield, and Acland street became less European and more for weekend tourists, until finally Scheherazade moved to Caulfield in 2008. The remaining cake shops of Acland Street are a reminder of this community, though most are no longer run by Jewish owners.

The junction of Acland and Barkly Streets is known as the Village Belle, after the Village Belle Hotel, which stands on Barkly Street opposite the end of Acland Street. Near the junction of Carlisle Street and Acland Street is Luna Park, one of Australia's best-known amusement parks, which attracts large crowds during the summer. Almost next door is one of Melbourne's grandest theatres, the Palais Theatre. Also on Acland Street is the St Kilda Army and Navy Club, built in 1923 with a hall on the first floor, a cinema to the rear, and flats for retired service personnel on top.

Today Acland Street has many restaurants offering a variety of cuisines, including Vietnamese, Indian, Italian and Malaysian. A large McDonald's now stands on the corner of Acland and Carlisle Streets. In 2016 Acland Street was closed between Belford and Barkly Streets to through vehicular traffic with the tram stop rebuilt with two side platforms.

== Gallery ==
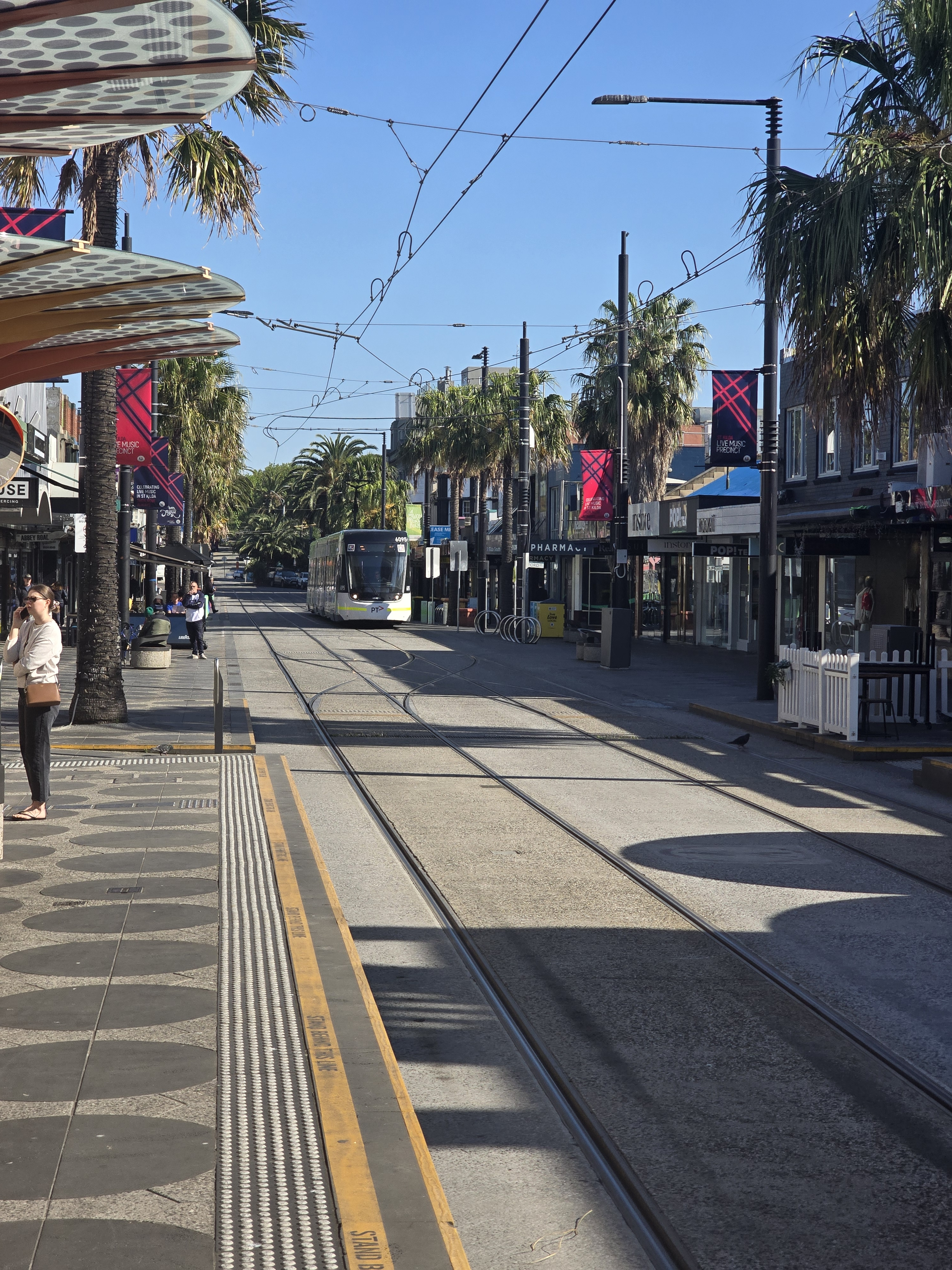
Acland St tram stop

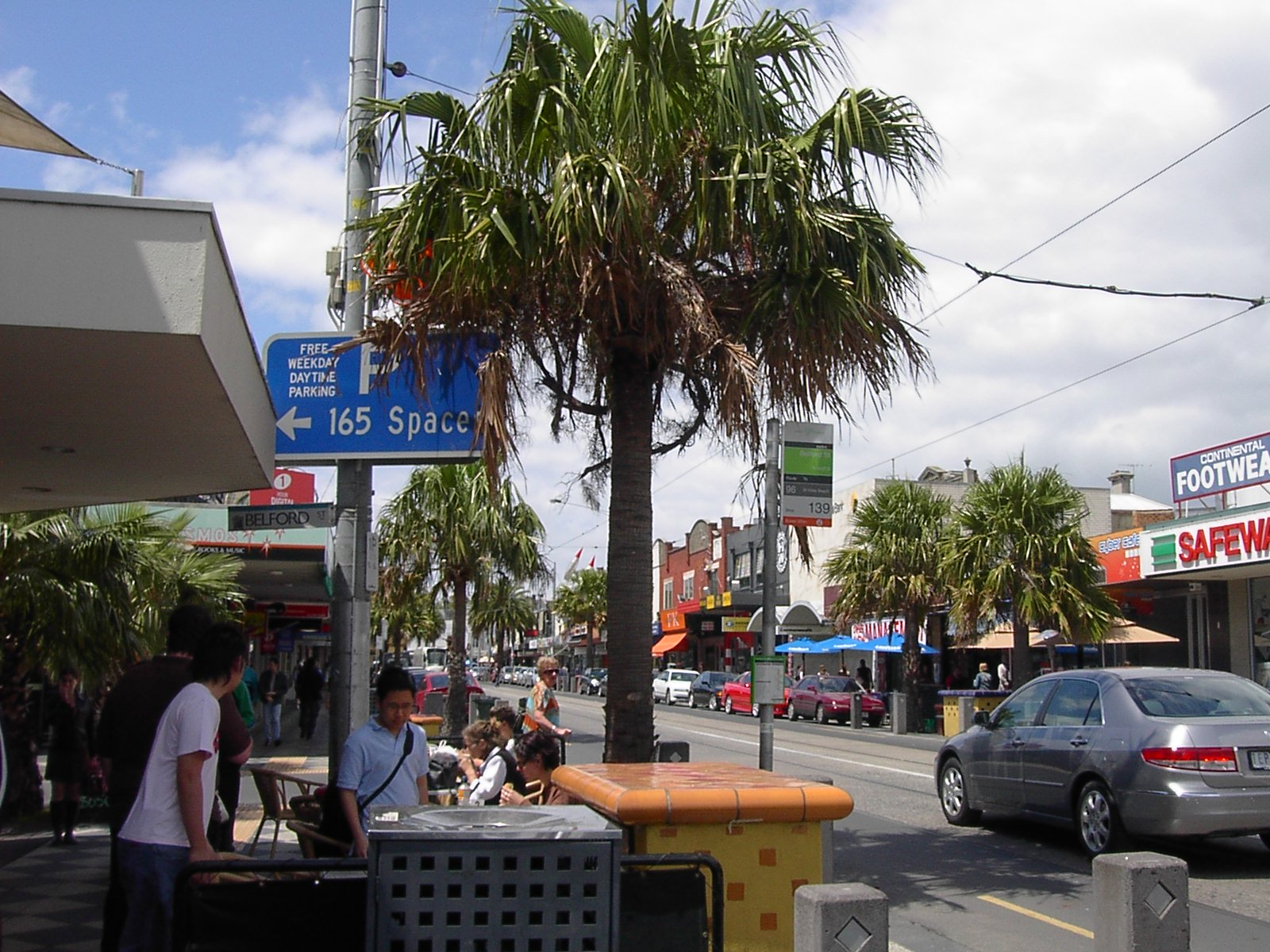
Another view of the street

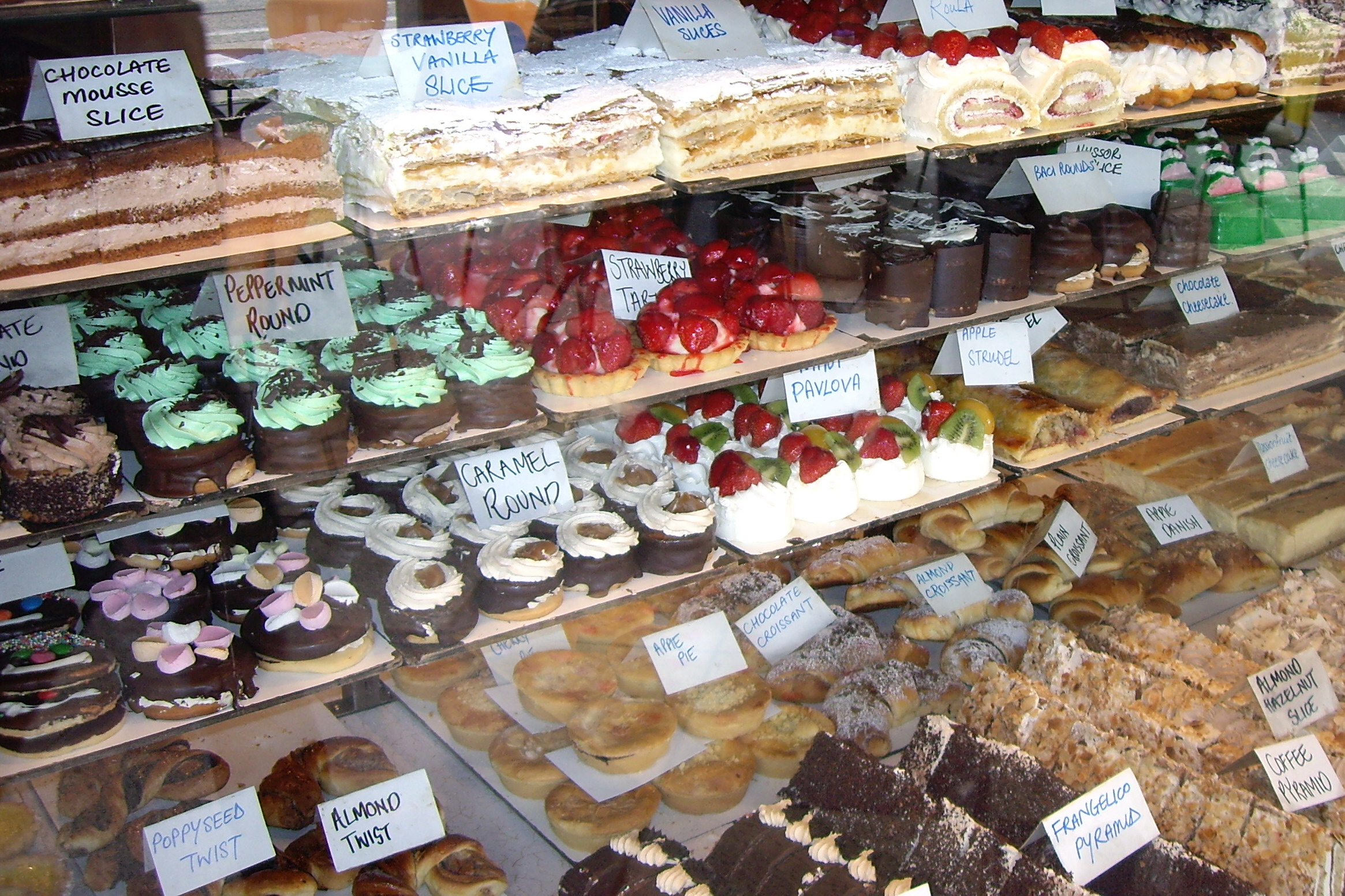
Acland Street cake shop window
