= Melbourne Tramway and Omnibus Company =

Melbourne Tramway & Omnibus Company
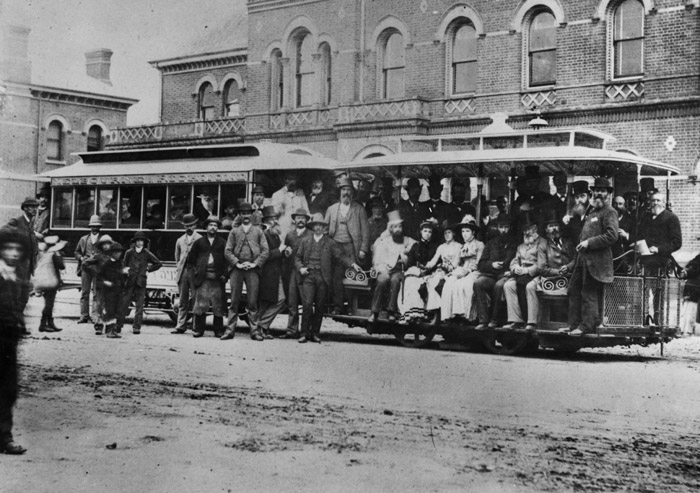
- Melbourne Tramway & Omnibus Company cable tram in 1885
- Commenced operation: 1885
- Ceased operation: 30 June 1916
- Service area: Melbourne
- Service type: Cable system

The Melbourne Tramway and Omnibus Company (MTOC) was the company that established and operated Melbourne's cable tram system from 1885 to 1916.

== History ==
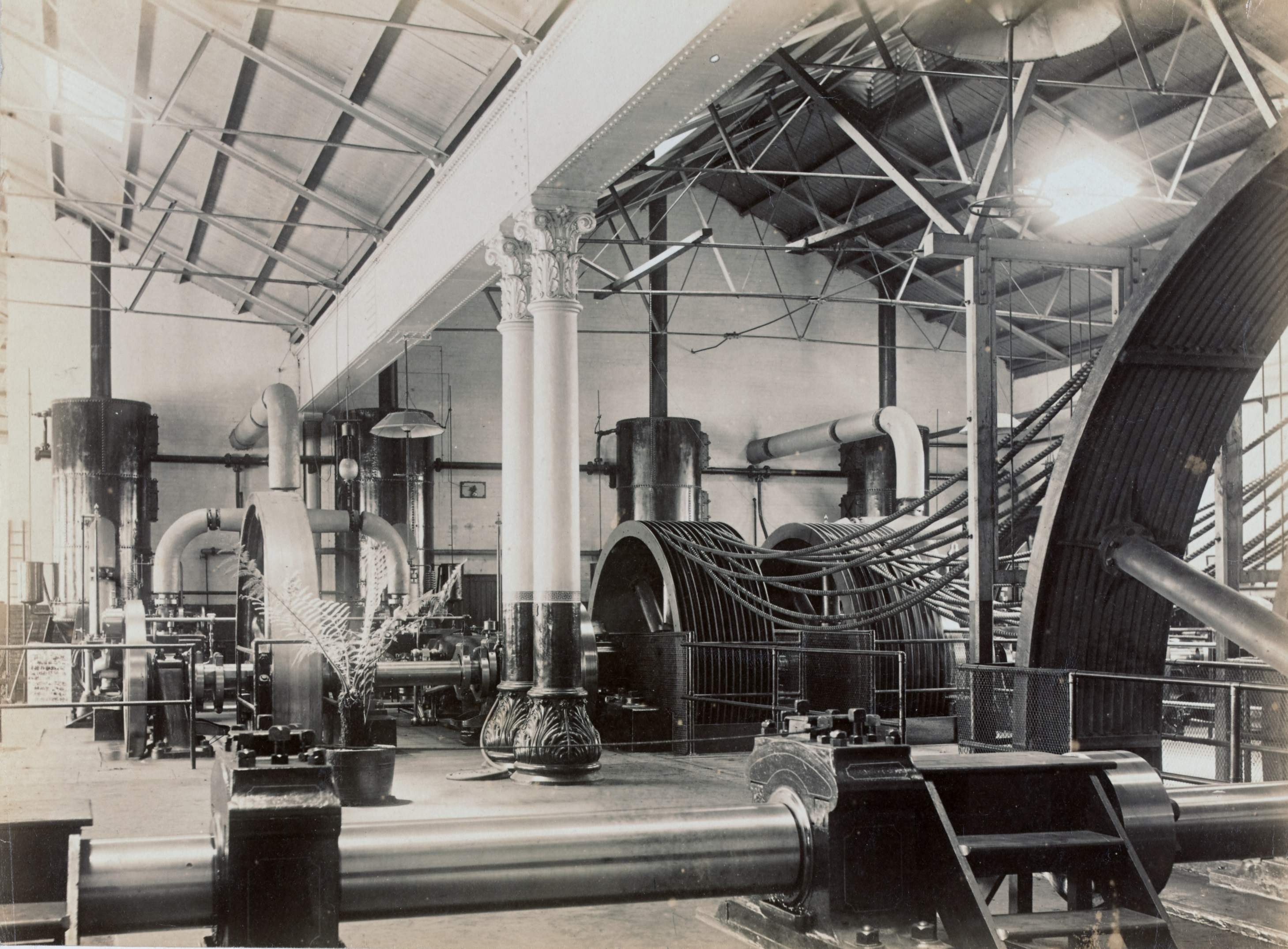
Engine house and cable winding machinery, Melbourne Tramway & Omnibus Company, 1898

The MTOC was started by Francis Boardman Clapp, who had come to Australia from the United States in 1853 to search for gold. In 1869 he set up the Melbourne Omnibus Company which ran horse-drawn omnibuses in the inner suburbs of Melbourne. The company carried five million passengers. Clapp reorganised the company into the Melbourne Tramway and Omnibus Company. By 1882 the company had over 1,600 horses and 178 omnibuses. In 1885 the company carried 11.7 million passengers.

In 1885, the Government of Victoria offered MTOC a 30-year exclusive contract to operate a tram system using either horse, steam or cable power. Clapp chose to use the cable system which was being used successfully in both Chicago and San Francisco. The 12 councils which were in the area to be serviced by the MOTC formed the Melbourne Tramway Trust. The Trust laid the tracks, bought land and built the cable winding houses. The MOTC provided the trams and operated the service. From 1885 to 1891 service was established to covered the suburbs of Brunswick, Carlton, Collingwood, Clifton Hill, Fitzroy, North Melbourne, South Melbourne, West Melbourne, Port Melbourne, Prahran, Richmond, St.Kilda and Toorak. By 1887 with the new cable cars, the company carried 18 million passengers.

The extant building at 673 Bourke Street, Melbourne bears the company logo, and may have been built to house the company's offices. The building was completed in 1891.

The MOTC's franchise expired on 30 June 1916, and the cable network was taken over by the State Government, which formed the Melbourne Tramways Board (later to become the Melbourne & Metropolitan Tramways Board) in 1919. This board amalgamated Melbourne's nine tram systems into one integrated network.
