= Spencer Street =

Street in Melbourne, Victoria

Coordinates: 37.8131°S 144.951°E

Spencer Street Victoria
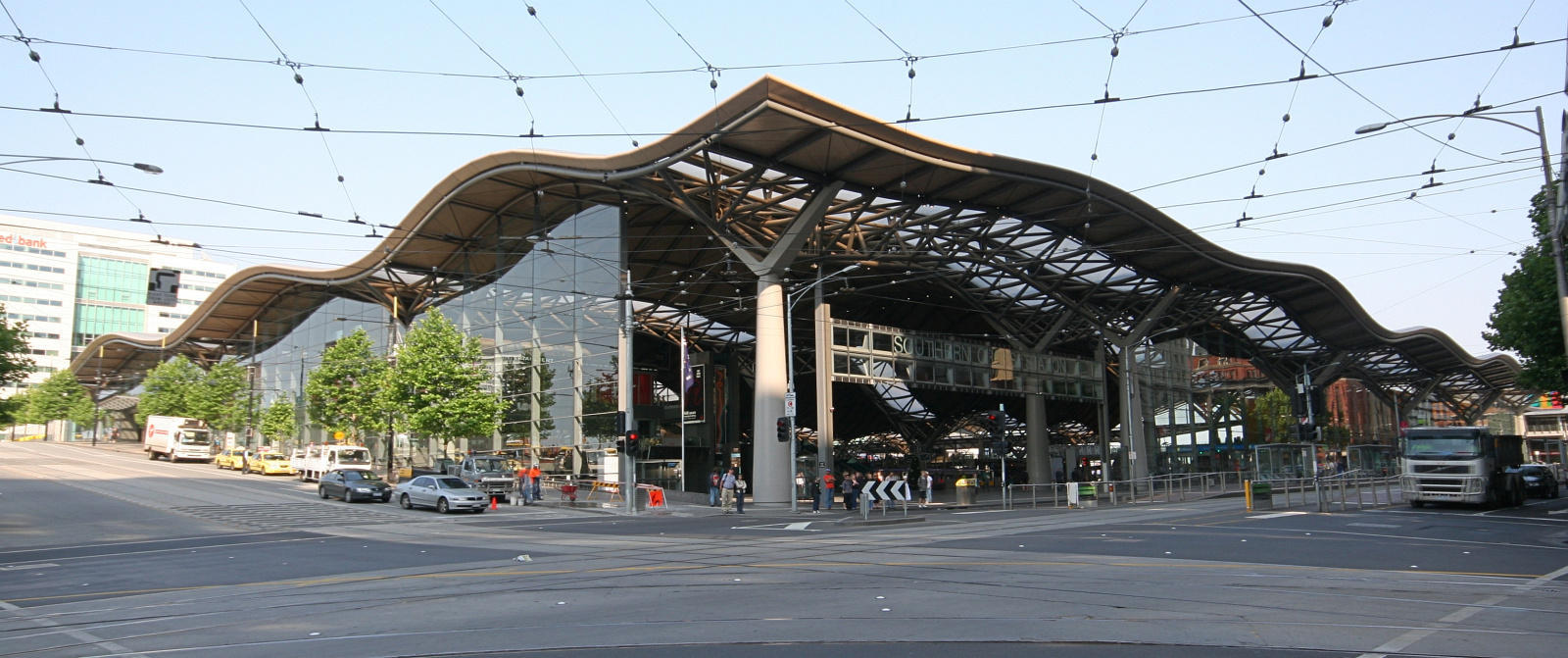
- The intersection of Spencer and Collins Street, looking north west toward Southern Cross station

General information
- Type: Street
- Length: 2 km (1.2 mi)
- Route number(s): Metro Route 50 (1989–present); Entire route
- Former route number: Metro Route 33 (1965–1989); Entire route
- Tourist routes: Tourist Route 2 (1989–present); (through Melbourne)

Major junctions
- NW end: Dynon Road; West Melbourne
- Dryburgh Street; Dudley Street; La Trobe Street; Lonsdale Street; Bourke Street; Collins Street; Flinders Street
- SE end: Clarendon Street; Southbank, Melbourne

Location(s)
- Suburb(s): Docklands, Melbourne CBD

Spencer Street is a major street and thoroughfare in the Melbourne central business district, Victoria, Australia. The street was gazetted in 1837 as the westernmost boundary of the Hoddle Grid.

Spencer Street is named for John Spencer, former Chancellor of the Exchequer in the United Kingdom. As the 3rd Earl of Spencer, he was the 2nd great uncle of The Princess of Wales, Diana Spencer. John's younger brother, Frederick, became the 4th Earl of Spencer on his brother's death. Frederick was Diana's 2nd great grandfather. On the 15th of April 1983, the Prince and Princess of Wales on their royal tour, departed Spencer Street Station for Ballarat, returning later that afternoon.

== Location ==
Running roughly north–south, Spencer Street forms the western edge of the original Hoddle Grid. To the north Spencer Street becomes Dynon Road, whilst to the south it becomes Clarendon Street after crossing the Spencer Street Bridge over the Yarra River.

Spencer Street denotes the boundary between Melbourne and Docklands to the west, West Melbourne in the north and Southbank in the south, near Batman Park.

== History ==
Spencer Street was the site of the first permanent buildings in the settlement now called Melbourne. The home of John Batman was built on nearby Batman's Hill where he lived until his death and the early camps of Captain William Lonsdale and Charles La Trobe were located along the street.

With the creation of Docklands in 2000, the rebuilding of Southern Cross railway station in 2006 and the addition of a shopping centre, the area has undergone significant urban renewal.

== Notable buildings ==
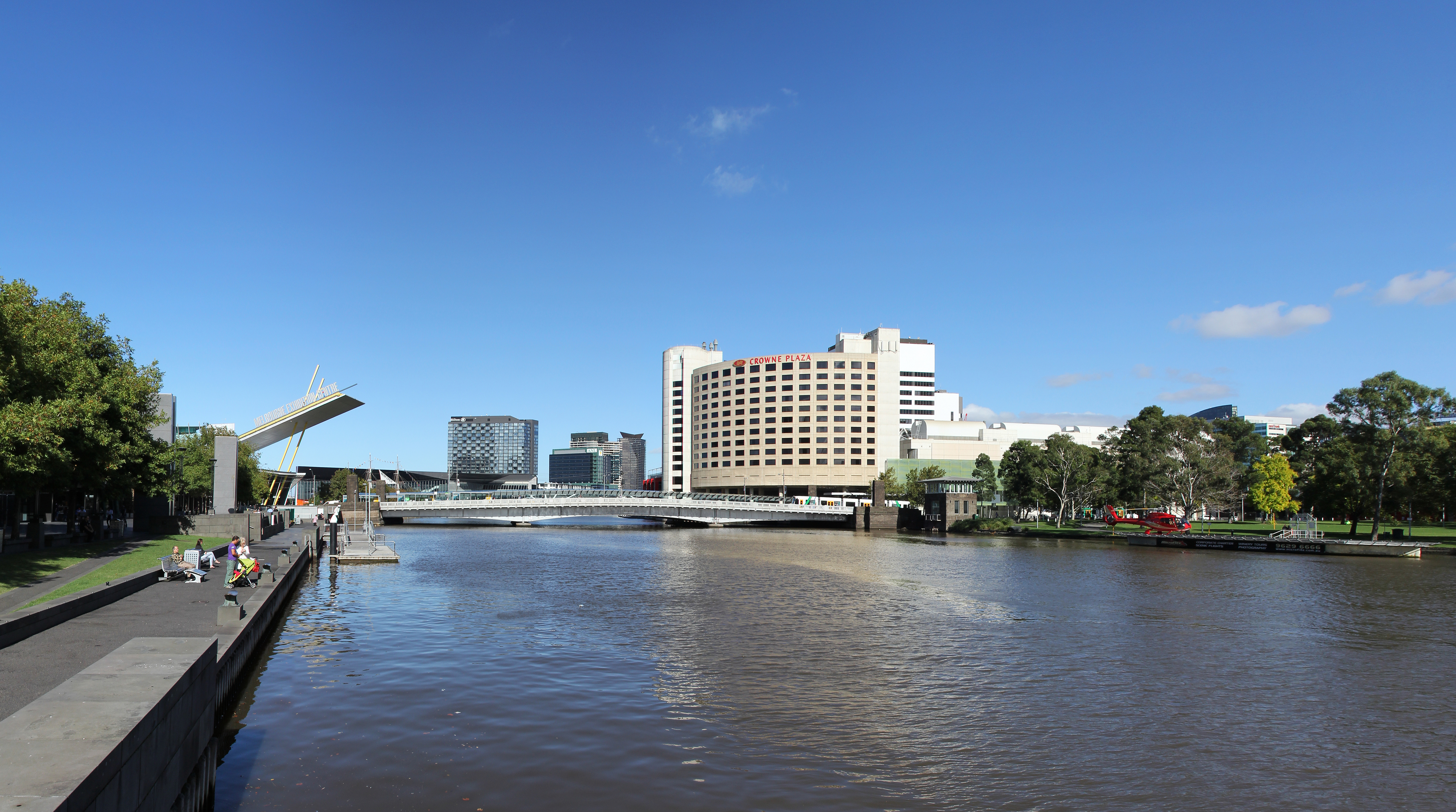
Yarra River and Spencer Street Bridge

Many buildings and structures on Spencer Street are listed on the Victorian Heritage Register and/or classified by the National Trust of Australia. Others are more modern and significant for their current or future function. These include:

=== Heritage Listed ===
- Grand Hotel and Grand Central Apartments (the former Victorian Railway head office)
- Former Mail Exchange
- Overhead Water Tank (part of the former Spencer Street Power Station, demolished 2008)
- History of Transport Mural by artist Harold Freeman (at Southern Cross railway station)
- Sands and McDougall's Warehouse

=== Other Buildings ===
- Southern Cross station
- Former Charles Hotham hotel
- HM Melbourne Assessment Prison

=== Under Construction ===
Several apartment buildings and hotels are currently under construction, including the Ritz-Carlton which will be Australia's tallest hotel when completed.

Victoria's largest police station, the City West Police Centre, is located on Spencer Street. The Victoria Police Centre is set to open adjacent to it on Spencer Street as the new headquarters for Victoria Police in 2020.

== Transport ==
Spencer Street is served primarily by the Southern Cross railway station and is both a major terminus for V/Line regional passenger trains and a major stop for metropolitan trains. The street is served by tram routes 11, 12, 35, 96 and 109 at its southern end and 30, 75 and 86 towards the north.

== Ghost sightings ==
There have been reports of supposed sightings of the ghost of John Spencer roaming around the corner of Francis Street and Spencer Street. This local attraction has brought ghost hunters from around Australia to investigate the phenomena, and is a common stop for local ghost tours.
