= Robert Russell (architect) =

Australian architect (1808–1900)

Coordinates: 37°42′26″S 144°56′17.9″E

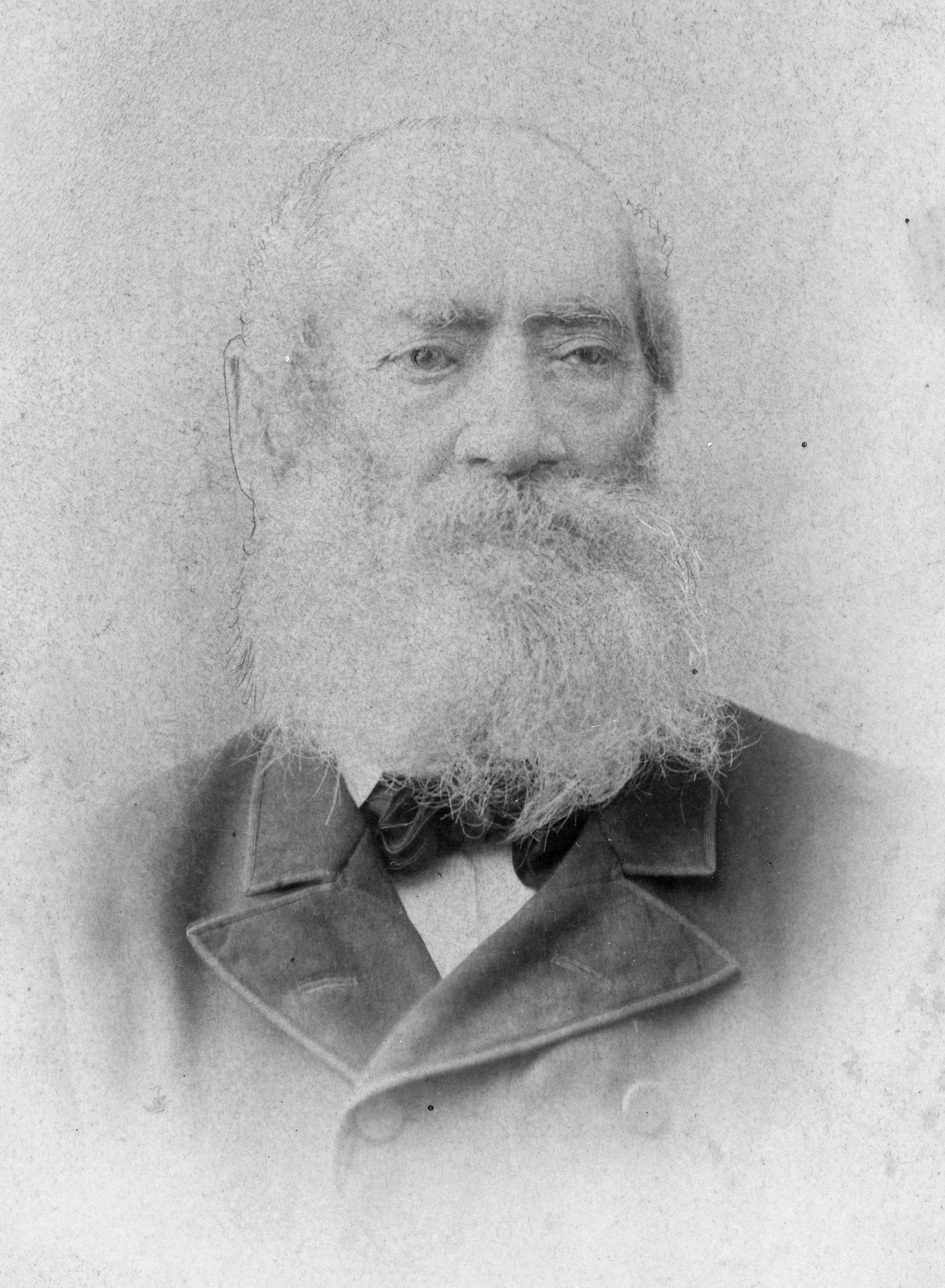
- Portrait of surveyor & architect Robert Russell, about 1890
- Born: 13 February 1808; Kennington Common, England.
- Died: 10 April 1900 (aged 92); Richmond, Melbourne, Australia
- Occupation: Architect
- Buildings: St James Old Cathedral
- Projects: Survey of Melbourne

Robert Russell (13 February 1808 – 10 April 1900) was an architect and surveyor, active in Australia. He conducted the first survey of the site of the nascent settlement of Melbourne on the banks of the Yarra River in 1836, and designed St James Old Cathedral, the oldest building remaining in central Melbourne (albeit not on its original site). He was also a prolific and talented artist and his work is held by major libraries and galleries in Australia.

== Early life ==
Russell was born near Kennington Common, London, England, the son of Robert Russell, a merchant, and his wife Margaret, née Leslie. After a 'sound education', Russell 'had his first business experience' in Edinburgh in 1823 where he was articled to the architect and surveyor William Burn. After some time in London, where he worked in the office of John Nash, Russell moved to Drogheda, Ireland to work on the ordnance survey. This experience gave Russell 'a preference for surveying, as allowing greater leisure' and his 'curiosity about Australia led to his emigration'.

The Sydney Herald of 23 September 1833, noted the arrival of 'the ship Sir John Rae Reid' from 'London, and Hobart Town, on Tuesday last' and among the 'passengers from England' was 'Mr. Robert Russell, surveyor'. In possession of letters of introduction to Thomas Mitchell, then Surveyor General of New South Wales, Russell was employed by the Survey Department as an 'acting assistant' on 22 October 1833'.

== Survey of Melbourne ==
In 1835 John Batman and John Pascoe Fawkner organised rival groups of free settlers from Van Diemen's Land (now called Tasmania) to cross Bass Strait and illegally settle on the site of what would become Melbourne. In response, the Imperial authority in London authorised William Lonsdale to lead a party to establish an official settlement the following year. As part of this Russell was appointed as Surveyor and assigned Frederick Robert D'Arcy and William Wedge Darke as assistants. They 'received orders to proceed to Port Phillip forthwith'. They arrived at Port Phillip on the Sterlingshire on 5 October 1836.

Circumstances following their arrival led to group undertaking the survey of Melbourne which set out the inner city street grid as it is known today. Russell recalled that after disembarking from the Stirlingshire his 'party of three' commenced 'surveying the shores of Port Phillip Harbour' but this work was interrupted when:

"On one occasion we found our horses not quite ready for the trip into the bush and decided to spell them for a week. While we were waiting it occurred to me that we might as well fill in the time by making a survey of the site of the future settlement. I took the triangulation, Mr Darke worked along the river, and Mr D'Arcy, who was a first-class draughtsman, prepared a plan showing the natural features of the ground. I suppose we were about a week over it altogether."

When asked how he determined the position of the future city he referred to the 'illegal' arrivals of John Batman and John Pascoe Fawkner the year before:

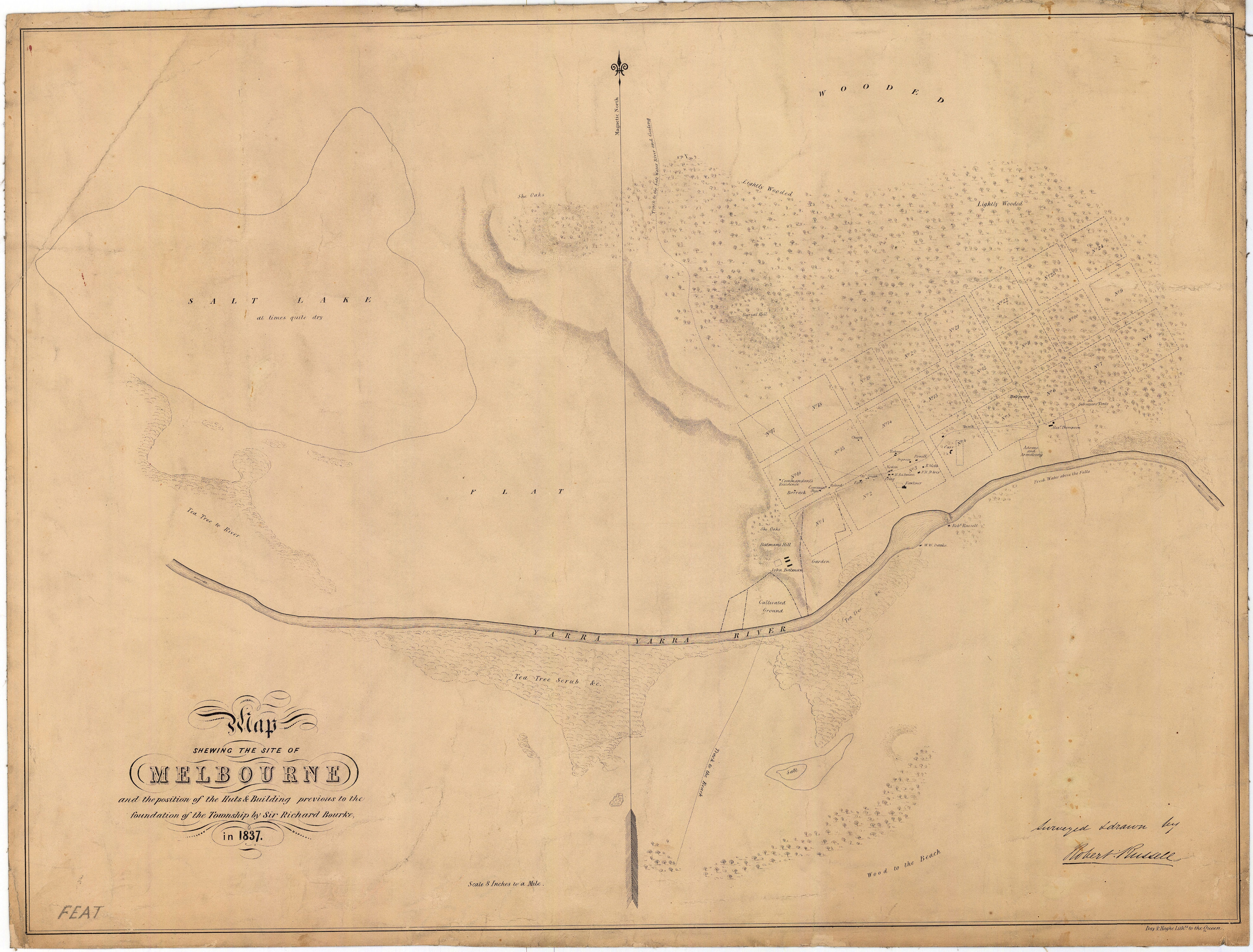
The first survey of the city of Melbourne by Robert Russell in late 1836 - early 1837.

"That was largely settled for me by the first settlers who built their huts on the present site of the future city, and whom I sought to disturb as little as possible in making the survey. The idea was to have as few of the huts as possible actually in the streets, from which in a very little time they would have to be removed. The old falls on the Yarra really determined the position of the city. The first hut builders kept close to them. The preference for the locality – the high ground between Queen, King, Flinders, and Bourke streets – lasted for some time after the building of Melbourne had begun, and all of the earlier buildings shown on old plans are dotted about there."

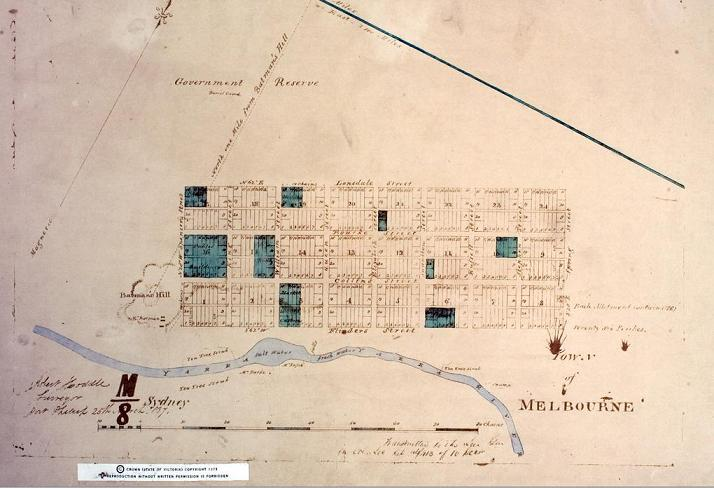
Robert Hoddle's survey of the town of Melbourne in 1837.

In May 1837 Russell had to 'return to Sydney to complete surveying commitments' and was to be 'relieved by Mr. Surveyor Hoddle'. Before Hoddle left Sydney he asked Russell to send him his survey of Melbourne which drew on a 'general plan' held 'in the Sydney office generally approved as suitable for laying out a new township' which Russell had a copy of. Along with D'Arcy and Darke, Russell accompanied Hoddle as he made his own survey, before Russell returned to Sydney. As Robert Hoddle was the colony's surveyor when the first plan of Melbourne was officially published this led to the city design being dubbed the Hoddle Grid.

At Hoddle's death in 1881 The Argus published an article which set out the reasons why it believed 'a gentleman so intimately associated with the foundation of Melbourne as to deserve the honour of a civic funeral'. Two days later a 'Letter To The Editor' appeared:

"Sir, – Permit me to correct a small mistake in your narrative of this date concerning the late Mr. Robert Hoddle.

You state that, "Messers. Darke, D'Arcy, and Russell, at one time were hard at work defining the outlines, fixing the boundaries, and marking the corners of the streets" of Melbourne. This is a thorough fiction. I never defined, fixed, or marked one outline, boundary, or corner of the incipient city. It is true I accompanied Mr. Hoddle on horseback when he started from Batman's-hill, and began his round to his starting-point, but I was merely a looker-on. That I was the first "surveyor in charge" at Port Phillip; that I was superseded, as I then thought and still think, unfairly; and that Mr. Hoddle drew his lines of street on the plan of my survey, drawn by Mr D'Arcy, under my instructions, prior to Mr. Hoddle's arrival, and which may still be seen at the surveyor-general's office, are facts much more to the purpose. – I am, &c. ROBERT RUSSELL

East Melbourne, Oct. 29."

In 1899 at the age of 91, he gave a lengthy interview to The Argus explaining the circumstances of his and Hoddle's work on the first plan of Melbourne in great detail. In closing he was quoted as saying:

"Those are my reasons for saying that Mr. Hoddle practically adopted my survey of the site of the city. The credit of making the first survey was a mere matter of detail then, though years later the honour came to be one worth claiming. The original plan of Melbourne which I prepared, and which I looked upon as my own property, as I was merely filling in time, was sent to my father in England, who had it printed, and some of the copies were afterwards supplied to the Public Library. That briefly is the story as to how I came to make the first survey of the city of Melbourne."

Another early colonist, Robert Frost, 'who arrived on the site of the city before a tree was felled or a sod turned' supported Russell as having first 'laid out' the city and said 'the honour has been wrongly borne by Mr Hoddle'. However, it is argued by some, especially descendants of Robert Hoddle that "It is to Hoddle that we owe the provision for squares, park lands and exits from the city, and he is entitled to be called the first surveyor and planner of Melbourne." The question continued to spark debate in newspaper letters pages and at meetings of the Royal Historical Society of Victoria years later. As The Age suggested in 1935 'Just who made the original survey of Melbourne may well be a matter for discussion for centuries to come'.

== Later career ==
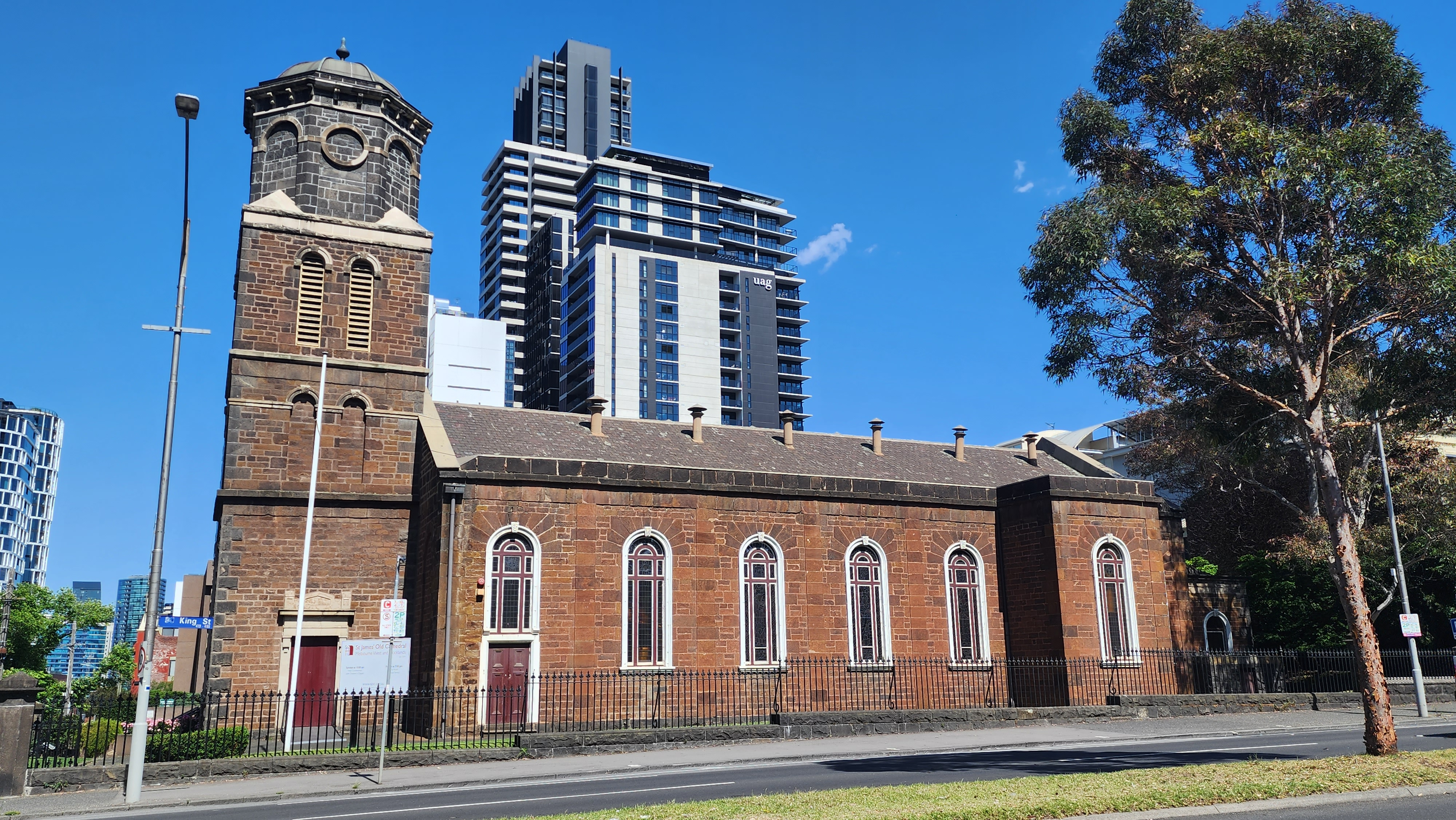
Russel designed St James Old Cathedral, Melbourne, in the 1800s.

In 1839, Russell designed St James Old Cathedral, the oldest building in Melbourne (though moved just outside the city grid in 1914) and one of the very few pre-Gold Rush buildings in the city.

Russell later practised as an architect in Melbourne until he was forced to retire by old age. He kept his mind to the last and died at Richmond, Melbourne, on 10 April 1900, aged 92. He married and was survived by two sons and two daughters.

In addition to being an architect and surveyor Russell did 'extensive work as a sketcher, amateur photographer, etcher, lithographer (and) carver'. He did valuable work as an amateur artist by preserving many original sketches of Melbourne in its early years, in both water-colour and pencil and in 1952 an exhibition of his 'lost paintings' was held at the Tye gallery in Melbourne Russell's artwork is in the collections of the State Library of Victoria, National Gallery of Victoria, the National Library of Australia and the State Library of New South Wales. There is a portrait of him in old age painted c. 1890 by Frederick McCubbin in the collection of the National Library of Australia.

In 1969, the Victorian chapter of the Australian Institute of Architects named their St. Kilda Road property 'Robert Russell House' in recognition of his work.
