= Lonsdale Street =

Street in Melbourne, Victoria

Lonsdale Street Victoria
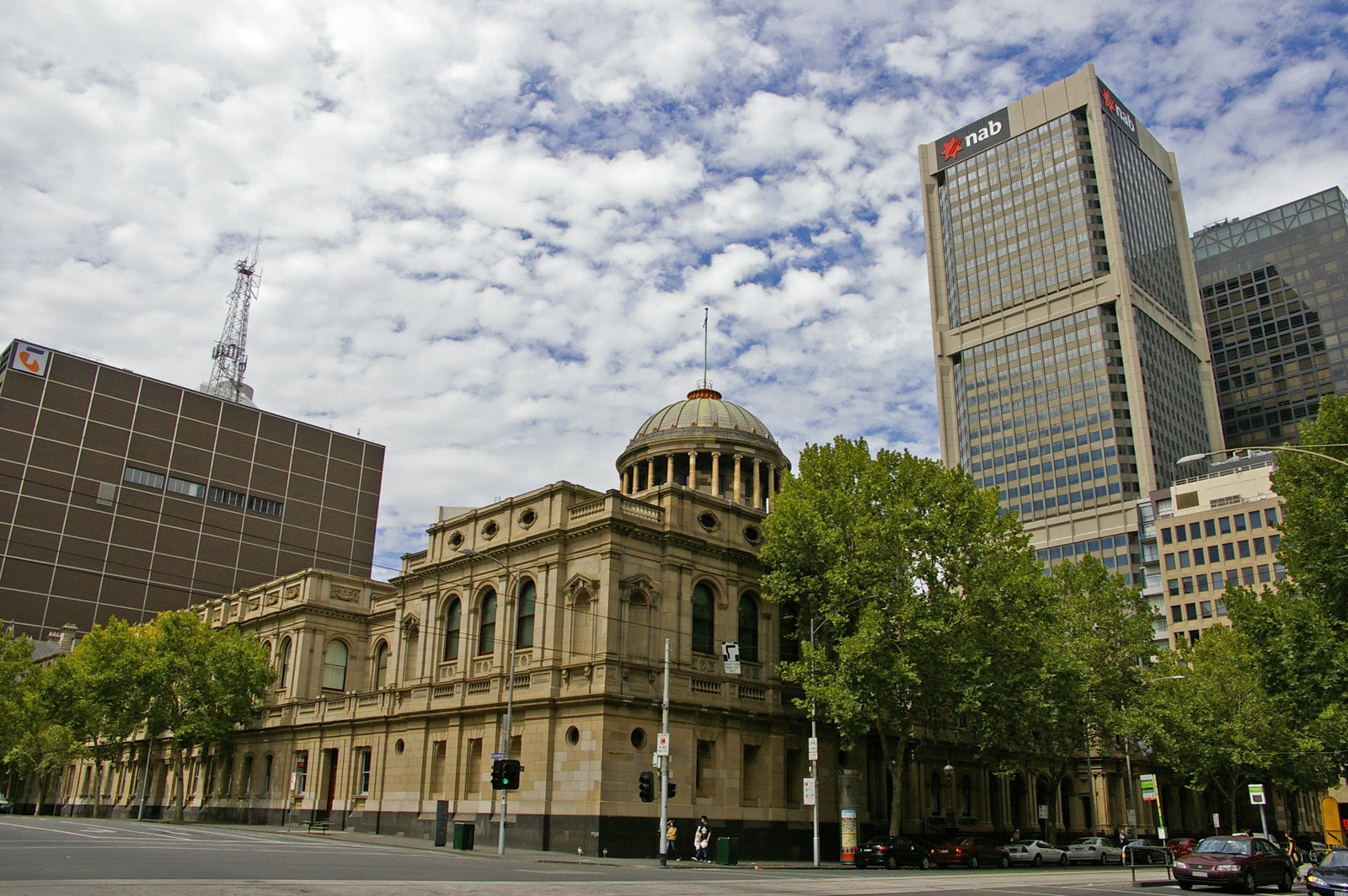
- The Supreme Court of Victoria on Lonsdale Street
- Coordinates: 37.811563°S 144.964734°E

General information
- Type: Street
- Length: 2 km (1.2 mi)
- Opened: 1837

Major junctions
- West end: Spencer Street; Melbourne CBD
- King Street; William Street; Queen Street; Elizabeth Street; Swanston Street; Russell Street; Exhibition Street; Spring Street; Nicholson Street
- East end: Albert Street; East Melbourne

Location(s)
- LGA(s): City of Melbourne
- Suburb(s): Melbourne CBD

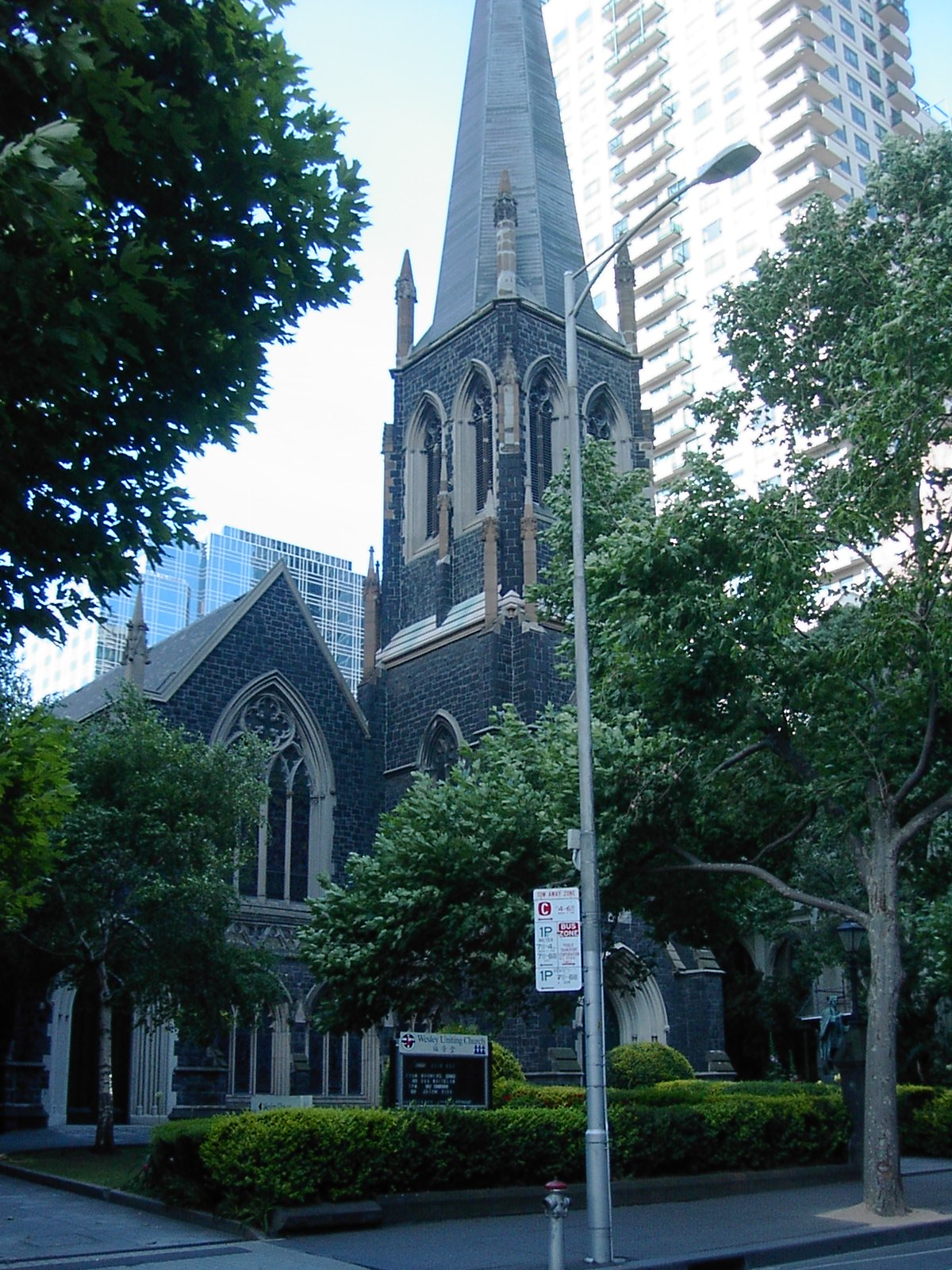
Wesley Church

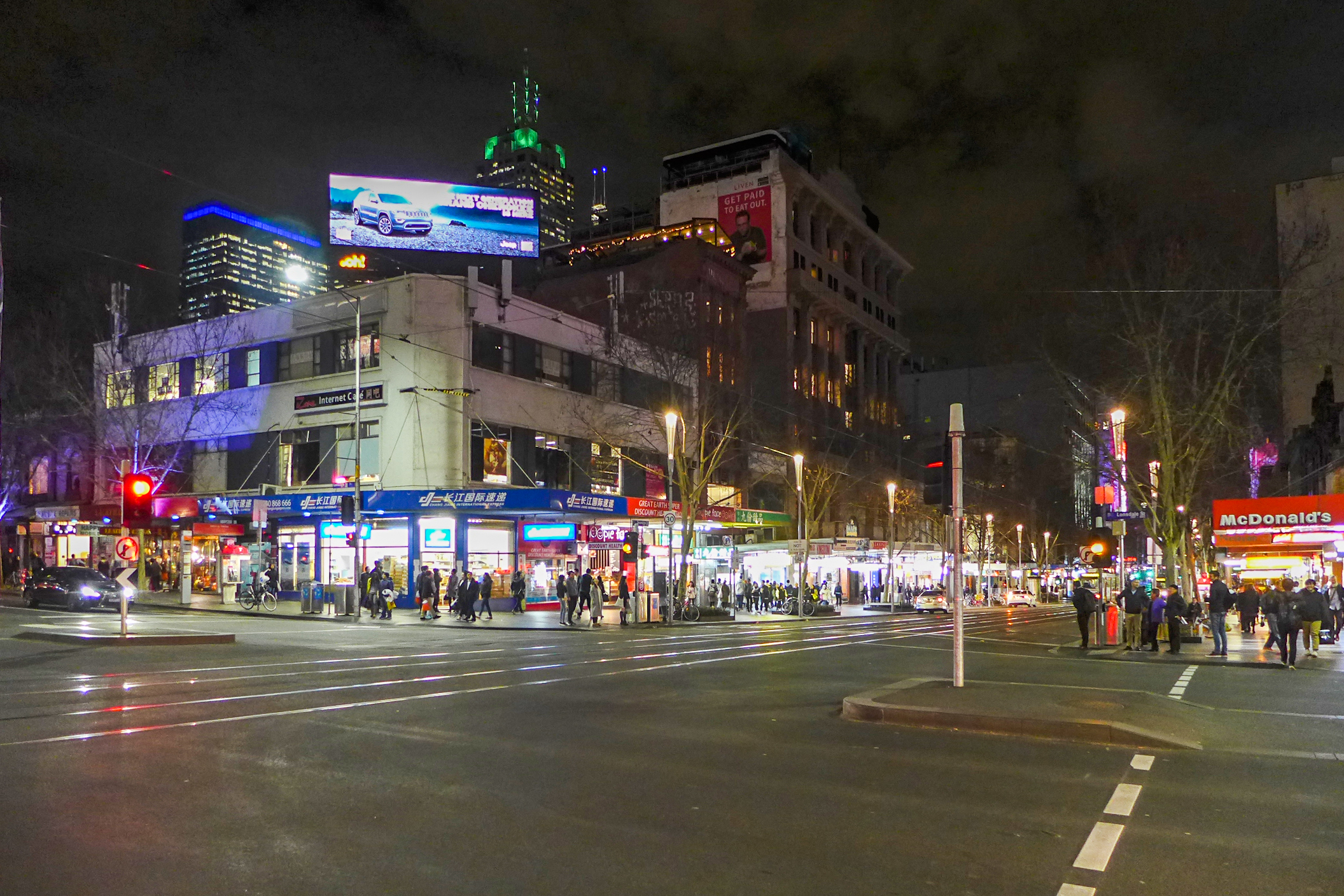
Lonsdale Street near Swanston Street

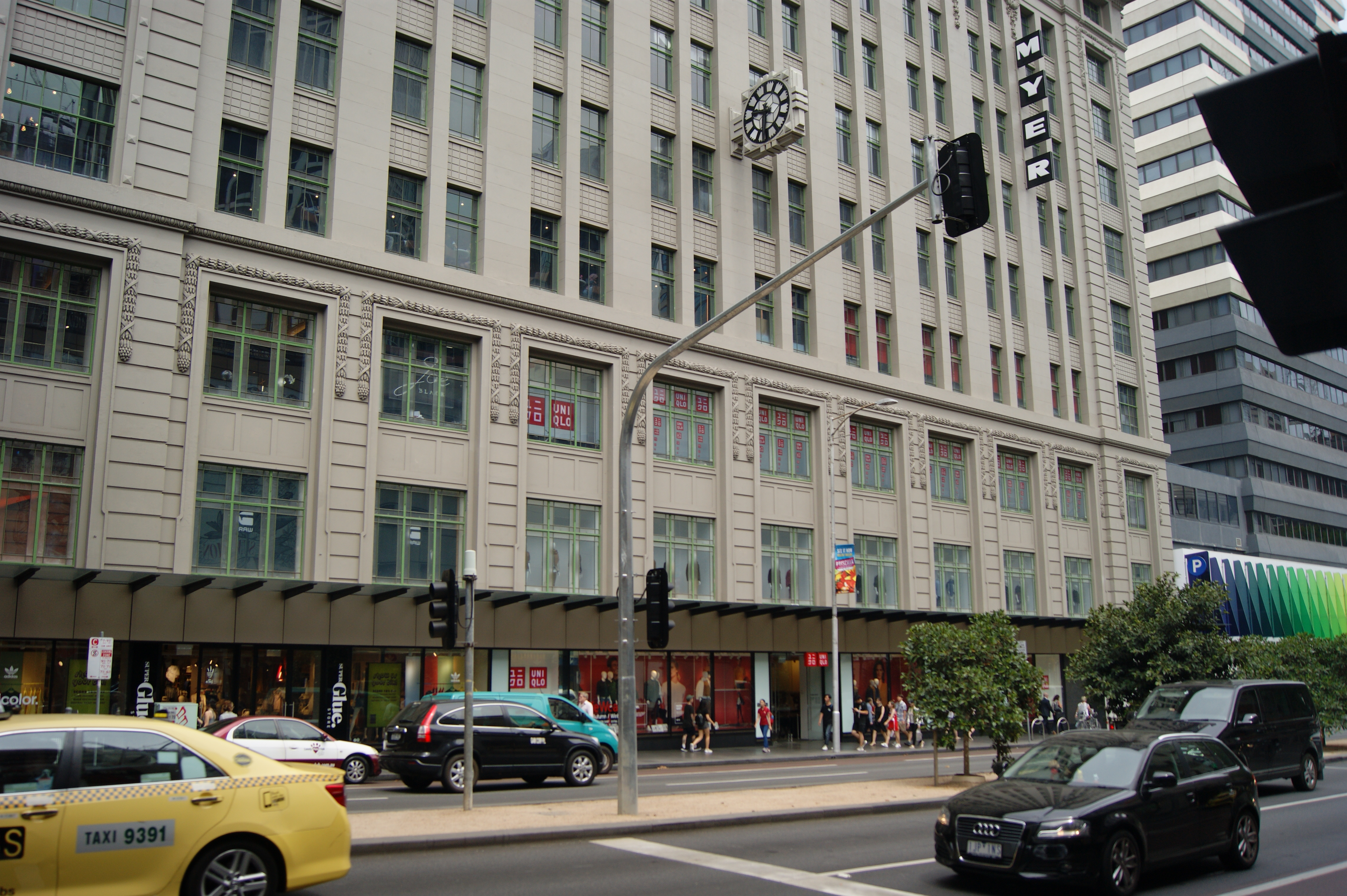
Emporium Melbourne on Lonsdale Street.

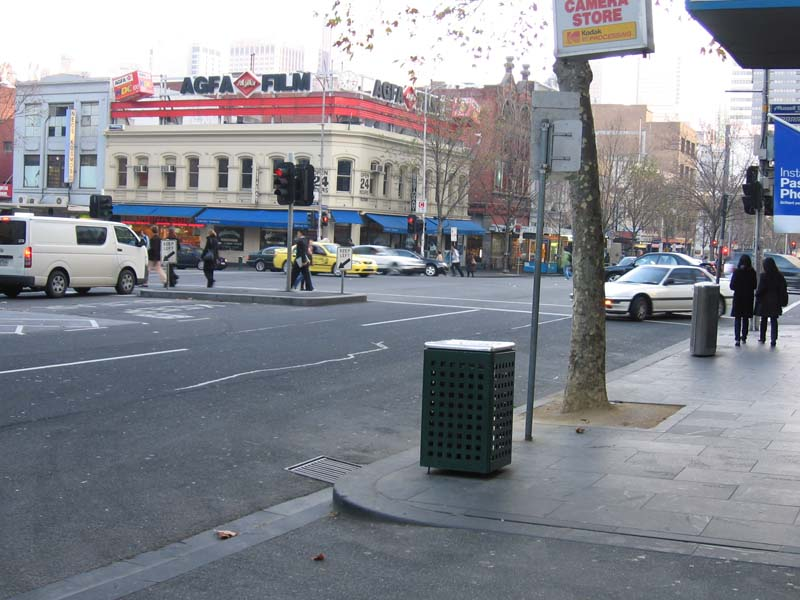
Corner of Russell and Lonsdale Street looking south west

Lonsdale Street is a main street and thoroughfare in the Melbourne central business district, Australia. It runs roughly east–west and was laid out in 1837 as one of Melbourne's original boundaries within the Hoddle Grid. The street extends from Spring Street in the east to Spencer Street in the west.

Lonsdale Street is home to multiple office buildings, churches, restaurants and shopping centres. Its most notable function is housing the State of Victoria's legal precinct and courthouses. The street is also named for Melbourne's first magistrate, William Lonsdale.

== History ==
=== 19th Century ===
Lonsdale Street was included in the grid developed by Robert Hoddle, the chief surveyor for the new settlement of Melbourne. Whilst Lonsdale and other streets were originally designed at 99 feet, then Governor Richard Bourke initially objected to the large sizing. Hoddle persuaded him, on the basis of health and convenience, to allow the larger street width featured in present-day Lonsdale Street.

The foundation stone for Victoria's oldest Catholic church was laid in 1841 at the corner of Elizabeth street. The church is on the Victorian Heritage Register along with the second church on Lonsdale Street, the Uniting Wesley Church completed in 1858.

In the 1860s, the Melbourne Hospital opened on Lonsdale Street, near the corner of Swanston Street.

Law Courts were erected at the south-east corner of William and Lonsdale streets in 1884 to accommodate both the Supreme Court of Victoria and County Court. The court of General Sessions and the Court of Insolvency are also nearby on Lonsdale Street.

During the late 19th century the home and principal business venue of brothel proprietor Caroline Hodgson, better known as 'Madame Brussels', was located at 32-34 Lonsdale Street, not far from the Parliament of Victoria in Spring Street, from which it derived much of its clientele.

=== 20th Century ===
In 1911-1912 the Melbourne Hospital was rebuilt on Lonsdale Street and the original hospital was demolished and renamed the Queen Victoria Hospital. In 1946 it became first women's hospital in Victoria, operated for women by women.

The Princess Mary Club opened on Lonsdale Street in 1926 and provided accommodation in the city for young women who would otherwise be unable to receive a tertiary education. It continued in this capacity until 1977 and is due to be demolished as of 2016, despite heritage listing for the gothic-inspired building.

=== 21st Century ===
Australian department store Myer connected their Bourke Street store, over Little Bourke Street, with another premises on Lonsdale Street. Myer occupied these premises from the 1920s until 2010, when Emporium Melbourne opened in its space in 2014.

Melbourne Central, housing a railway station and shopping centre, opened on Lonsdale Street in 1991. It is a prominent feature of Melbourne due to its famous 1889 Coop's Shot Tower conical dome. Melbourne Central connects by a pedestrian sky bridge over Lonsdale Street to the Emporium centre.

From 2003, Queen Victoria Village, an integrated city block development consisting of residential units, retail outlets, and office buildings opened progressively on Lonsdale Street. The premises wrap around the only remaining pavilion of the former Queen Victoria Hospital, from where the complex derives its name.

West Side Place, a four tower mixed-use complex consisting of apartments, food and retail outlets was built on the former site of The Age newspaper headquarters. In addition to the apartments, food and retail outlets, a 5-star The Ritz-Carlton hotel and 4-star Dorsett hotel operate within the complex. The Ritz-Carlton in Tower A spans from level 61 to 81, with its sky lobby on 79.

== Transport ==
Major bus routes run along Lonsdale Street, with services predominantly running to the Eastern suburbs. The street was formerly served by a line of Melbourne's cable tram network. Cable trams were replaced by an electric tram network in the first half of the 20th century, but Lonsdale Street trams were not converted and thus removed.

== Greek Precinct ==
Between Swanston and Russell Streets there is a concentration of Greek restaurants and shops. This is known as Melbourne's Greek Precinct. The precinct is reflective of Melbourne having the largest population of Greeks outside of Greece. Melbourne is also a sister city to Thessaloniki, and a plaque commemorates this on Lonsdale Street.

At the corner of Lonsdale and Russell Street is 24-hour Greek restaurant Stalactites, which is famous for being the celebration place of Cypriot tennis player Marcos Baghdatis during his 2006 Australian Open campaign.

The Helenas Centre of Melbourne was also located on the corner of Lonsdale and Russell streets. The building was demolished in June 2013 and a new Greek Centre for Contemporary Culture, operated by Melbourne's Greek community, was opened in 2014. The building's principal design feature is the image of the classic ‘Discobulus’ (the Discus Thrower) made by the positioning of white shade panels on the building's blue glass exterior.

== Healeys Lane ==
One of the laneways connecting Lonsdale Street and Little Lonsdale Street is Healeys Lane. Known for its concentration of Korean restaurants, the laneway was officially designated as the City of Melbourne's Koreatown in September 2024.
