= William Wedge Darke =

Australian colonist and surveyor

William Wedge Darke (1810–1890) was an Australian colonist and surveyor.

== Biography ==
William Wedge Darke was the son of John Darke of Hereford and Elizabeth Darke, née Wedge, and younger brother of John Charles Darke and a nephew of John Helder Wedge from whom he learnt his profession. He arrived in Van Diemen's Land in 1827 with his parents, younger brother Henry and sister Elizabeth.

== Surveying career ==
In the early 1830s he was in private practice in Van Diemen's Land as a surveyor, then moved to New South Wales where he joined the survey department. In 1836 he was sent as an Assistant Surveyor under Robert Russell to survey the new settlement at Port Phillip.

At Port Phillip Darke carried out some of the first surveys of the new town of Melbourne and was instrumental in laying out the streets of the new town for sale at the first land auctions.

He had numerous disputes with Robert Hoddle and was eventually engaged on a contract basis.

Darke brought a wooden caravan from Sydney and set up camp with his family near Robert Russell's wood and daub hut on the south side of the Yarra River in what is now central Melbourne. The caravan, dubbed 'Darke's Ark', had two rooms and a piano, and was drawn by bullocks to locations convenient to his surveying duties around Port Phillip. The caravan was eventually left at the beach as a bathing house.

For a time Darke located his caravan at the seaside in what is now the inner city suburb of Port Melbourne after cutting the first track through the tea tree scrub. He hoisted a barrel on a pole, on high ground to point the way back to the Melbourne settlement and this led to the area's early name of 'Sandridge'. The earliest permanent white settler of Port Melbourne and talented amateur artist, Wilbraham Liardet was working on an illustrated history of Melbourne before his death and in a 1913 news article, drawn from Liardet's work, an early impression of Darke's 1837 camp – with 'Darke's Ark and 'barrel on a pole' – was published.

In 1843 he returned to New South Wales. In 1846 he was an Assistant Colonial Surveyor and lived with his wife and family in Pitt Street, Sydney.

In April 1860, notice was given that Darke had been appointed a licensed surveyor.

Many of his field notebooks are held in the Mitchell Library in Sydney.
