= Shot Tower =

A shot tower is used for the production of lead shot.

Places named Shot Tower include:

- Shot Tower (Dubuque), United States
- Shot Tower, Lambeth, England
- Shot Tower, Taroona, Tasmania
- Jackson Ferry Shot Tower, Virginia, United States
- Phoenix Shot Tower, Baltimore, United States listed on the NRHP in Maryland
  - Shot Tower station, a nearby metro station
- Shot Tower (Max Meadows, Virginia), listed on the NRHP in Virginia
- Shot Tower (Spring Green, Wisconsin), listed on the NRHP in Wisconsin
- George W. Rogers Company Shot Tower, Dubuque, Iowa, listed on the NRHP in Iowa
