= William Lonsdale (colonist) =

Australian politician

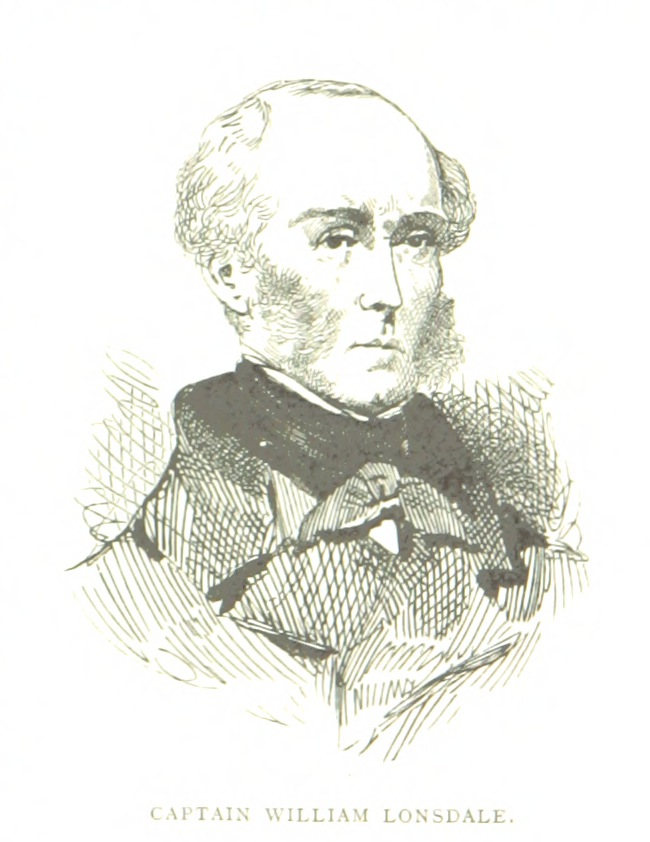
- Born: 2 October 1799; Den Helder, Batavian Republic
- Died: 28 March 1864 (aged 64); London, England
- Occupations: Colonist, public servant
- Spouse: Martha Smythe
- Children: 4 sons and 4 daughters

William Lonsdale (2 or 21 October 1799 – 28 March 1864) was a British army captain in colonial Australia who supervised the founding of the official settlement at Port Phillip (later named Melbourne) from 1836. He went on to serve under the superintendent (and later Lieutenant Governor) La Trobe from 1839 to 1854.

== Early life ==
Lonsdale was born in Den Helder, Batavian Republic, during Britain's failed campaign to restore the deposed Prince William of Orange. His father, Lieutenant James Lonsdale, had been accompanied by his wife Jane (née Faunce). William at age 20 joined his father's old regiment, the King's Own (4th) Regiment of the Foot, as an ensign on 8 July 1819. He was soon joined by his younger brother, Alured. William and Alured served with their Regiment in the West Indies and on 4 March 1824 William was promoted lieutenant and appointed adjutant. He returned to England and was posted to Portugal. By 1830 he was back in England and by 20 March 1831 his regiment was posted to the Colony of New South Wales to relieve the 39th Regiment. He was to become a colonial administrator in addition to his profession as a soldier.

== Colonial Australia ==
Lonsdale arrived in Sydney on 14 December 1831 with a detachment of troops guarding convicts on the Bussorah Merchant. During the next five years he served in the colony of New South Wales, his brother Alured serving in Van Diemen's Land before joining him in New South Wales in 1833. Whilst stationed at Port Macquarie, William was able to purchase his commission as a captain, and married Martha née Smythe on 4 April 1835. He returned to Sydney Town and on 2 January 1836 was gazetted as a magistrate of the territory and also as assistant police magistrate. William and Martha's first child, Alice Mary, was born at Parramatta on 20 February 1836.

The increasing problem of illegal settlements at the remote location of Port Phillip on the south coast of New South Wales was to be resolved by Governor Sir Richard Bourke when, having reported the matter to London, he received imperial authority to establish a settlement. He immediately appointed Captain William Lonsdale as Chief Agent of Government, Police Magistrate and Commandant for the Port Phillip region. Lonsdale's Chief Agent duties were authorised in written instructions from Governor Sir Richard Bourke:

With reference to part of Captain Lonsdale's instructions inform the Collector of Customs and Surveyor-General that owing to the distance of Port Phillip from Sydney and the difficulty of frequent communication, it has been thought proper to give the Police Magistrate authority to act for the Government in certain cases and therefore direct them to instruct their officers proceeding to Port Phillip to attend to such orders as they shall receive from Captain Lonsdale which will be their sufficient warrant and to apply to him for advice and assistance in any case of doubt or difficulty or when anything is required by them out of the usual course of service.

This effectively gave William Lonsdale authority that made him an unofficial "superintendent". Colonial secretary Alexander McLeay followed this instruction with a written appointment for Lonsdale stating that the Governor had placed his

entire confidence in his intelligence and discretion by giving him the General Superintendence of the new settlement over all matters that should require the immediate exercise of Government authority on the spot.

His instructions also contained specific reference to the aboriginal natives in which he was to

conciliate them by kind treatment and presents, protect them from any manner of wrong, maintain friendly relations with them and improve by all practical means their moral and social conditions.

There was added comment that "if they became violent they were to be restrained by the gentlest means, but they (the natives) must try to understand that white or black, all came under the Laws of England."

He also had instructions from the governor to submit "confidential reports" on the developments at Port Phillip. It appears that the Governor Bourke was engaged in a power struggle with Sydney's colonial bureaucracy, labelled the "Exclusives", his colonial secretary McLeay being a member of that group. This "confidential report" appeared necessary to ensure no one of significance gained too much prior advantage in any land development at this Port Phillip outpost. Captain William Lonsdale was held in high esteem by Governor Sir Richard Bourke, who had personally chosen him to manage this Port Phillip settlement foundation.

Lonsdale's salary was 300 pounds Sterling, 50 pounds being deducted whilst he drew half pay from his regiment as Commandant of a Company of the King's Own 4th at Port Phillip. He received a 100-pound outfitting allowance for this new appointment. The governor, with his authority over the Royal Navy in the region, instructed Captain William Hobson and HMS Rattlesnake, just arrived in Port Jackson, to transport Captain William Lonsdale, his family and public officers to Port Phillip. Lonsdale had to establish a new remote settlement in an areas that was only accessible by sea, as southern New South Wales was a vast forest with large rivers, yet to be explored, with no overland route existing from Sydney to Port Phillip. Thus it was important that a warship of the Imperial Navy be present to reinforce the governor's power, now delegated to Lonsdale as General Agent of Government.

Only twenty-one days had elapsed from the time Governor Bourke received imperial authority to establish the settlement to the time Lonsdale sailed in HMS Rattlesnake for Port Phillip. This speed reflected Bourke's concerns about the 200 illegal settlers at Port Phillip, who were claiming land and negotiating with the aboriginal natives for other areas.

Lonsdale travelled to Port Phillip with his wife Martha, daughter Alice and his one assigned servant. HMS Rattlesnake first anchored at the south end of the bay on 27 September 1836, where Hobson despatched a cutter for survey work, and by the 29th had proceeded north and anchored off Point Gellibrand, Hobsons Bay, near the mouth of the Yarra River. The survey cutter would join them later.

Captain William Lonsdale immediately landed unofficially, distributing the official proclamation of the establishment of the new settlement and followed this up with a second informal visit the following day.

On 1 October 1836 Captain Hobson had Lonsdale, in full King's Own uniform, formally rowed up the Yarra River by the Rattlesnake's crew and Marines, finally making landfall on the north bank of the river. A rock bar existed across the river at this point, the river pouring through a fissure in the rock. This location is where the present historic Customs House is now located.

Here Captain William Lonsdale was met by John Batman and Dr Thompson and other assembled illegal settlers, all anxious to have their land claims and investments validated.

Captain Lonsdale remained on Board HMS Rattlesnake until the prefabricated house, sent from Sydney for the Ensign, was erected on shore. Lonsdale chose this first government building for his, and his family's use until his own prefabricated house arrived in the next few months.

Three surveyors, two customs clerks, a commissariat clerk, Ensign King, thirty privates and thirty convicts arrived during October, on board the two hired transports, Stirlingshire and Martha.

Besides Lonsdale's duties for the immediate exercise of authority of the government, and his confidential reports to the governor, he was to take a census, noting land occupation and aboriginals.

When Governor Bourke visited Port Phillip in March 1837 he praised Lonsdale's ability, zeal and discretion, confirmed Lonsdale's choice of a site for the new town and named it Melbourne. Lonsdale chose the Yarra River site for its access to abundant fresh water, which the Williamstown site lacked. The foundations of the new settlement having been laid, Lonsdale conscientiously followed instructions, referring all decisions he made to his superiors in Sydney. Lonsdale supervised the first land sale in June 1837, and as there were no Banks in the Port Phillip settlement of Melbourne, he personally used his own funds in a Sydney bank to pay the government what was due to them. In this way he allowed purchasers to retain cash in the settlement which would have been otherwise left without any 'money in hand' needed for their further development of the settlement.

During the next two years of his administration, smaller frictions developed between Lonsdale and the government surveyors, Robert Hoddle and Robert Russell, and local entrepreneurs who resented his General Agent of Government powers.

Charles Joseph La Trobe arrived in Melbourne in October 1839 as Port Phillip's first superintendent and he relieved Captain William Lonsdale of his General Agent of Government duties. The people of Melbourne marked the occasion by giving William Lonsdale an address and financial gifts, from the settlers and the new superintendent. They presented him with 325 pounds for an inscribed silver service. Lonsdale continued to act as police magistrate until appointed as sub-treasurer of the district on a salary of 400 pounds in April 1840. His relations with Latrobe and the new governor, Sir George Gipps, were always good. When local government was introduced to Melbourne, Captain William Lonsdale was appointed the interim acting mayor until elections were held. When La Trobe was appointed acting as Lieutenant-Governor of Van Dieman's Land, William Lonsdale was appointed acting superintendent during La Trobe's absence.

In 1851, after Victoria became a separate colony, Lonsdale was appointed its first colonial secretary on a salary of 900 pounds. He served in the Victorian Legislative Council from 31 October 1851 to 1853, the turbulent years of the gold rushes.

During the period 1836 to 1854, the Lonsdale family increased in number (two dying in infancy) - Liona Kingsown b:1838, Edgar b:1839, Ellen Peveril b:1842 d:1842, William b:1843, Ralph Peveril b:1847 d:1852, Ethilda Wagstaffe b:1845, Rupert Latrobe b:1849.

Lonsdale Street, in the Melbourne central business district is named in his honour and his portrait is in the State Library of New South Wales

== Later life ==
Lonsdale's last public office was Colonial Treasurer on a salary of 1500 pounds from July 1853 until July 1854 when he followed LaTrobe's example, retiring and returning to England. In England the Lonsdale's had two more children - Maude Smythe b:1858 and Oswald b:1860. William died in London on 28 March 1864 and was survived by his widow, 4 sons and 4 daughters.

Victorian Legislative Council
New creation	Nominated Member; Oct 1851 – Aug 1853	Succeeded by John Foster
Preceded by Frederick Powlett	Treasurer of Victoria; Jul 1853 – Aug 1854	Succeeded by Charles Sladen
