= Robert Hoddle =

Anglo-Australian surveyor (1794–1881)

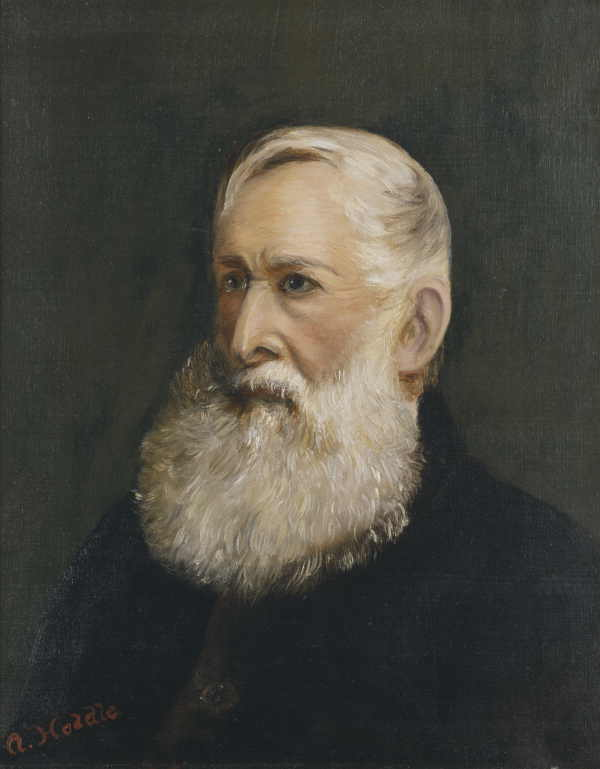
- Hoddle c. 1878
- Born: Robert Hoddle; 21 April 1794; Westminster, London, England, UK
- Died: 24 October 1881 (aged 87); Melbourne, Victoria, Australia
- Occupation: Surveyor
- Years active: 1812−1853
- Spouse(s): 1st Wife: Mary Staton (b. 1791 - d. October 1862) (married: November 1818); 2nd wife: Fanny Agnes Baxter (b. c. 1842 - d. 1929) (married: July 1863)
- Children: from 1st wife: 1 from 2nd wife: 3

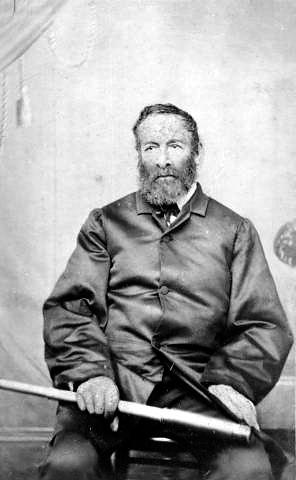
Robert Hoddle with his omnipresent surveying telescope

Robert Hoddle (21 April 1794 – 24 October 1881) was a surveyor and artist. He was the first Surveyor-General of Victoria from 1851 to 1853. He was previously the Surveyor-in-Charge of the Port Phillip District from 1837 to 1851. He became Surveyor-General upon the proclamation of the Port Phillip District as the new Colony of Victoria within the British Empire in July 1851. He is especially recognized for the design and layout of the Hoddle Grid in 1837, the area which forms the Melbourne central business district (CBD) of Melbourne. He was also an accomplished artist and depicted scenes of the Port Phillip region and New South Wales. Hoddle was one of the earliest-known European artists to depict Ginninderra, the area now occupied by Canberra, Australia's National Capital.

== Early life ==
Hoddle, the son of a bank clerk for the Bank of England, was born in Westminster, London. He became a cadet-surveyor in the British army in 1812. Hoddle worked in the Ordnance Department and took part in the trigonometrical survey of Great Britain. Hoddle then sailed for the Cape Colony, South Africa in 1822 where he worked on military surveys.

== Surveying in Australia ==
Hoddle migrated to the Australian colonies, arriving in Sydney, New South Wales, aboard the William Penn in July 1823. Governor Brisbane appointed him assistant surveyor under Surveyor-General John Oxley. Hoddle's first substantial assignment was to survey the Bells Line of Road route over the Blue Mountains, and from there to explore northwards in the Gardens of Stone, looking for a new route to the Hunter River. The exploration failed, there being no feasible route in that area. In 1824 he spent several weeks on an expedition to Moreton Bay to assist Oxley with surveys there. After Oxley's death in 1828 he surveyed under the direction of NSW Surveyor-General Thomas Mitchell, including surveying the sites for the towns of Berrima and Goulburn. Between 1830 and 1836, Hoddle made several visits to the rural district now occupied by the Australian Capital Territory where he surveyed property boundaries. Squatters were urgently pressing for government surveyors to legalise their rural holdings. Hoddle's field book indexes the history of the aforementioned areas and pastoralists— George Palmer, Robert Campbell and Hamilton Hume.

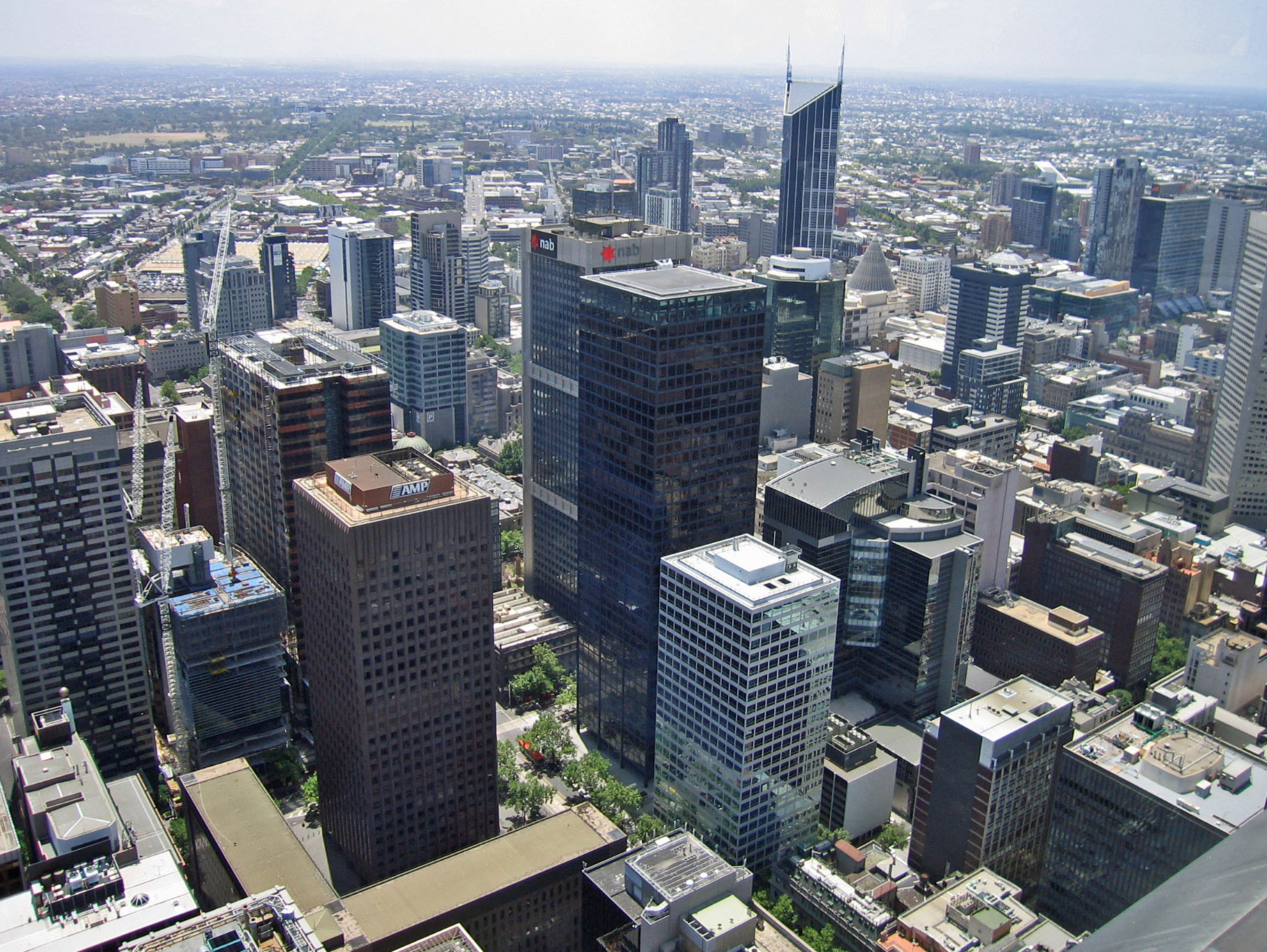
Melbourne central business district, designed by Hoddle

Hoddle arrived in Port Phillip, the future site for Melbourne, in March 1837 in company with Governor Bourke, as senior surveyor with his assistants D'Arcy and Darke. Whether Hoddle surveyed from scratch or used Russell's initial survey has been the subject of controversy, but they both followed the then standard grid layout and alignment. Hoddle's survey, a copy of which survives in the Public Record Office of Victoria, is dated 25 March 1837, and covered the area from Flinders Street to Lonsdale Street, and from Spencer Street to Spring Street. The principal streets were one and a half chains wide (30 m), and at the insistence of Bourke, smaller east–west streets a half chain wide (10 m) were inserted, intended to furnish back entrances (but quickly became frontages in their own right). This layout came to be known as the Hoddle Grid.

In 1837, at the same time as Melbourne, Hoddle laid out the first blocks of Williamstown, but without rear laneways. In 1838 he laid out Geelong, including narrow laneways as in the Melbourne grid. His layouts for each were typical of the time, being square or rectangular grids, aligned with features such as rivers or waterfront, surrounded by government reserve for future expansion, government buildings, ports and the like.

Hoddle subdivided the land beyond the angled city grid on a one-mile north–south grid, creating much larger allotments. The areas closest to the city in what is now Fitzroy, Collingwood and Richmond, were soon subdivided by speculators creating the sometimes quite narrow streets and irregular grid pattern. Hoddle's subdivision of East Melbourne was far more regular.

Hoddle was in favour of the principal entry streets being a generous width of 60 m, which he applied to what are now Melbourne's tree-lined boulevards, such as St Kilda Road, Victoria Parade, Elizabeth Street in Carlton, and the roads branching off that: Royal Parade and Flemington Road. He advocated widening the other existing major roads without success. In 1853 he was gently asked to retire in favour of Andrew Young, who is credited with the subdivisions of Carlton, Fitzroy North and South Geelong that include formal parks, squares and crescents.

== Artist in ink and watercolours ==
Robert Hoddle is the earliest-known European artist to have depicted the Australian Capital Territory area. Many of his works are held in the National Library of Australia, State Library of Victoria and the State Library of New South Wales.

Some of the paintings he made during this time are held at the National Library of Australia. They include:

- Ginninginderry, i.e. Ginninderra, Plains, New South Wales; watercolour
- Ginninginderry, i.e. Ginninderra, Plains; watercolour

Additional works by Hoddle include:

- View from Limestone Hill called Campbells Hill, New South Wales, March 1832; watercolour
- The seven day's in the Week's Occupation of the Australians, hunting, 1835; ink wash
- Unidentified coastal landscape, New South Wales, 1; watercolour
- Unidentified coastal landscape, New South Wales, 2; watercolour
- View from Illawarra Range en route to Kiama, 1830; watercolour

== Later life ==
William Lonsdale appointed Hoddle as auctioneer at the first sale of crown land on 1 June 1837, at which he sold half-acre (0.2 ha) allotments for £18 to £78, considered at the time a very high price. Hoddle's commission was £57 12s. 7d., from which he bought two allotments for himself at a cost of £54. Hoddle built himself a house on the corner of Bourke and Spencer streets where, in retirement, he tended his trees, played organ and flute and translated Spanish.

== Death ==
Hoddle died at his residence on the north east corner of Bourke and Spencer Street, a lot he bought at one of the first land sales, on 24 October 1881.

== Legacy ==
- Hoddle Highway
- Hoddles Creek, Victoria, a small town located East of Melbourne
- Hoddles Creek, a tributary of the Yarra River
- Hoddle survey tree, a heritage-listed River Red Gum used by Hoddle as a survey marker

Preceded by New creation	Surveyor General of Victoria; 1851–1853	Succeeded by Andrew Clarke
