= Defence Explosive Factory Maribyrnong =

Defence Explosive Factory Maribyrnong; Defence Site Maribyrnong
- Cordite Avenue, Maribyrnong, Victoria in Australia
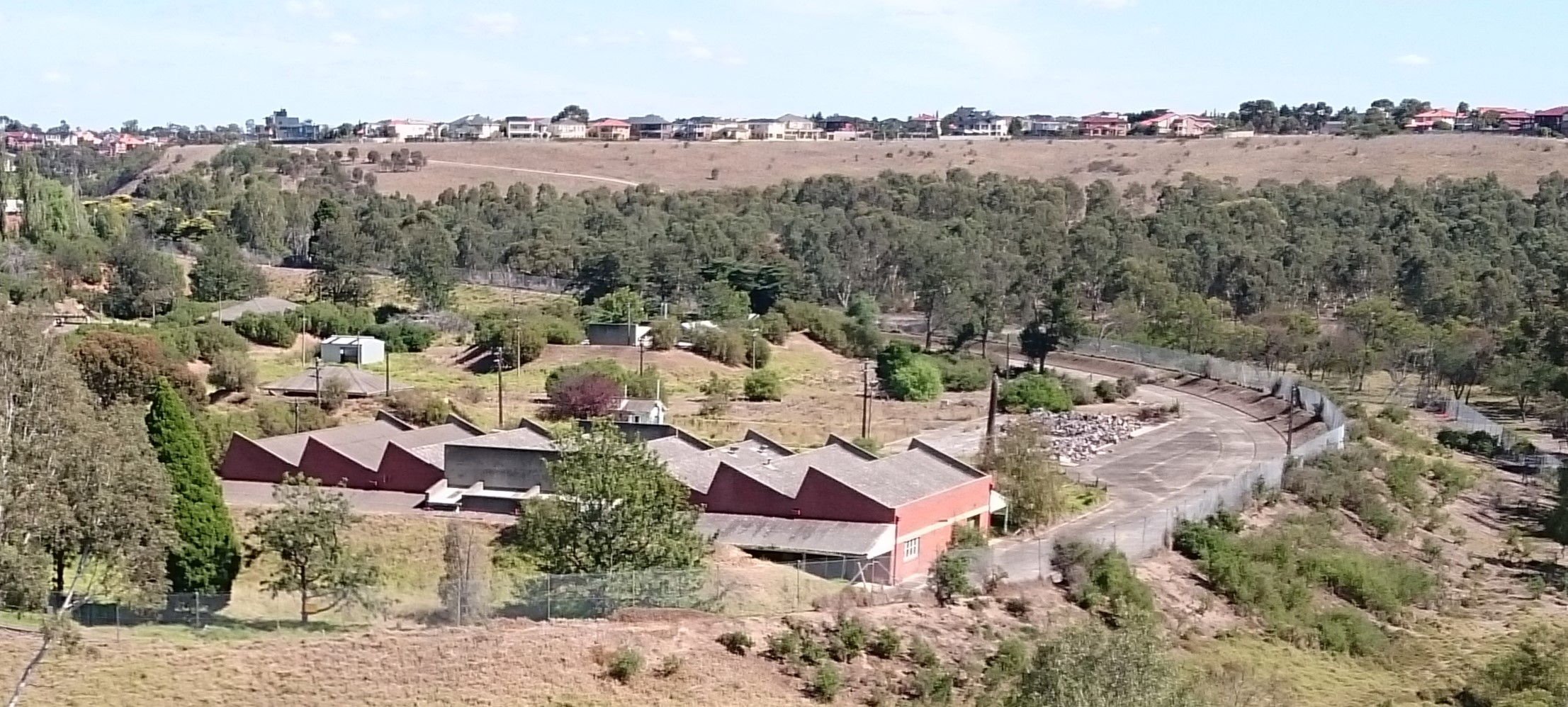
- View of northern part of site from Afton St reserve. Houses on ridge behind site are in Avondale Heights

Site information
- Type: Munitions factory (former)
- Code: EFM (factory); DSM (entire site)
- Owner: Department of Defence
- Open to the public: No
- Condition: Contains asbestos and other contaminants; Some assets protected by heritage orders; Structures damaged by fires
- Other site facilities: Stables date from 1888-89 (extant)

Location
- Location of the former site in Greater Metropolitan Melbourne
- Coordinates: 37°45′50″S 144°52′46″E
- Area: 127.8 ha (316 acres)

Site history
- Built: 1910; 116 years ago
- Built for: Australian Government
- Architect: John Smith Murdoch (RAFA Barracks)
- In use: 1910—1994 (factory [EFM]); 1910—2005 (entire site [DSM])
- Fate: Divestment of DSM in process (as of April 2026)
- Battles/wars: World War I and World War II
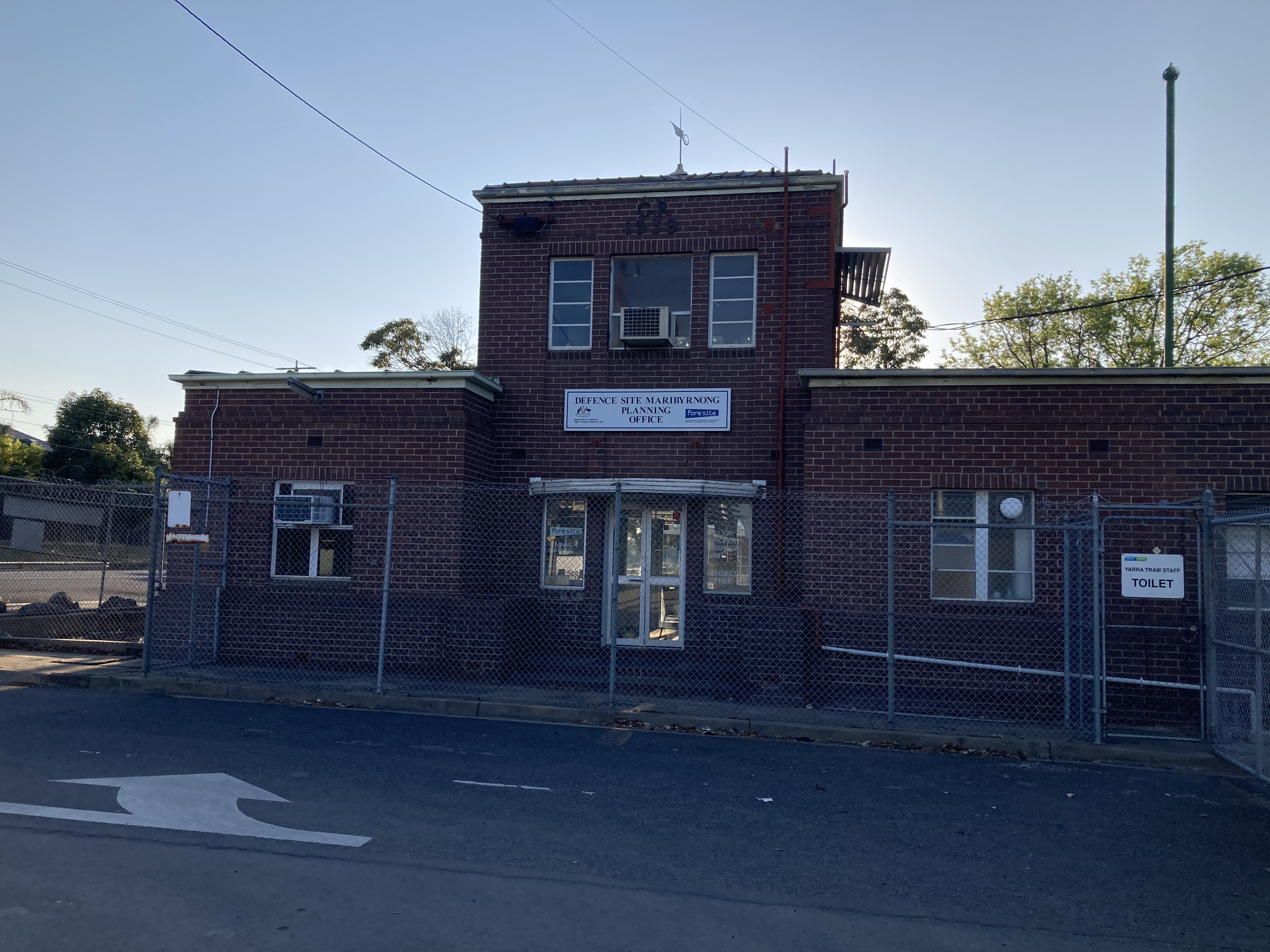
- Security building adjacent to the Cordite Avenue entrance

Commonwealth Heritage List
- Official name: Defence Explosive Factory Maribyrnong
- Type: Listed place (Historic)
- Criteria: A1, A4, B1, C2, D2, H1
- Designated: 22 June 2004
- Reference no.: 105325

Victorian Heritage Register
- Official name: Former Royal Australian Field Artillery Barracks
- Type: Registered place
- Designated: 5 October 1995
- Part of: Defence Site Maribyrnong
- Reference no.: H1098
- Heritage overlay no.: HO72
- Categories: Military; Manufacturing and Processing

The Defence Explosive Factory Maribyrnong (abbreviated as EFM) is a heritage-listed military installation and former munitions factory located at Cordite Avenue, Maribyrnong, an inner-western suburb of Melbourne, in Victoria, Australia. Built in 1910 and actively producing munitions for World War I and II, the factory was closed in 1994.

The site comprises the Explosives Factory Maribyrnong (EFM) and the adjacent Materials Research Laboratory (Explosives Ordnance Division) (MRL)(EOD) and the Engineering Development Establishment (EDE) and Army and Airforce Canteen Services areas. The site is bounded on the west, north and north-east by the Horseshoe Bend of the Maribyrnong River, in the east by the western and southern boundaries of the former CSIRO research station (but including the sites of Fisher Stables and Raleigh House), the Maribyrnong Community Centre and the former Migrant Hostel and Maribyrnong Immigration Detention Centre, and Cordite Avenue in the south.

The former factory is located on a 127.8-hectare (316-acre) site, called Defence Site Maribyrnong (abbreviated as DSM) that was used by the Defence Department until 2005 and, in 2010, was determined by the Australian Government as surplus to its future requirements. As part of the divestment and open sale process, a request for proposal for the remediation and redevelopment of DSM closed in July 2024, with Defence considering options for the site's future, and has undertaken consultation with the community. As of October 2025, some assets on the DSM site were contaminated with asbestos.

The former factory (EFM) site was added to the Australian Commonwealth Heritage List on 22 June 2004; and the former barracks, being part of the DSM site, was added to the Victorian Heritage Register on 5 October 1995 in recognition of its historically, architecturally and socially significance to Victoria. The site was previously added to the non-statutory and now defunct Register of the National Estate on 21 November 2000.

== History ==
=== Horse stud and racecourse ===
The land on which the Explosives Factory Maribyrnong (EFM) stands was put up for sale at an auction of Crown land in 1843. The allotments on the eastern part of the site were bought by Joseph Raleigh, while those on the western side were purchased by James Johnston. Raleigh used his property for agricultural and pastoral purposes and erected a house and stables on the top of what is now known as Remount Hill. In 1862 the South Australian pastoralist Hurtle Fisher acquired Raleigh's property and set about turning it into one of Australia's most famous stud farms for racehorses.

Fisher sold most of the farm to his brother, Charles, in April 1866 and was purchased by George W. Petty two years later. Petty, who had amassed a fortune as a butcher, ran the property very successfully as a stud for thoroughbred horses such that Maribyrnong Stud became a celebrated name in Melbourne racing circles. In 1875, two years before his death, Petty sold the property, which was re-purchased by Charles Fisher who continued to operate it as a stud for thoroughbred horses. Fisher also purchased the original Johnston holdings on the western side of the EFM site. In 1888-89 Fisher erected a large new set of brick stables (Building No. 248) which remain extant.

Fisher sold the western portion of property in about 1892 to the three Cox brothers of horse-racing fame, Archibald Robert, William Samuel and Albert Cox. The Cox brothers established a private racecourse, the Maribyrnong Racecourse, and held race meetings there until c. 1900 – c. 1901. The track continued to be used for training purposes until c. 1908, while in 1904 it served as the venue for Victoria's first motor sports meeting. In the mid-1890s Fisher sold his stud farm on the eastern side of the current EFM site to Sir William John Clarke, the largest landowner in Victoria and a breeder of thoroughbred horses. It is highly likely that Clarke continued to use the property as a stud farm for racehorses and he may also have used it to breed and train horses for his horse artillery battery. The breeding and training of horses on the property were probably continued after Clarke's death in 1897 by his son and heir, Sir Rupert Clarke, who was a leading racehorse owner and breeder in his own right and a member of his father's horse artillery battery.

=== Development of defence industries ===
In 1878, the Victorian Colonial government had built a large gunpowder magazine known as the Saltwater River Powder Magazine or simply Jack's Magazine (Note: Also listed on the Victorian Heritage Register.) on a site to the south in Footscray near the river. Though by no means intended at the time, the building of this magazine laid the foundation for the Footscray/Maribyrnong area to develop as the centre of Australia's armaments industry. A significant impetus towards this development occurred in 1889 when, following a proposal put forward by Victoria at the first meeting of the Federal Council of Australasia in Hobart three years earlier for the establishment of a Federal ammunition factory for the Australian colonies, the Colonial Ammunition Company erected a plant next to Jack's Magazine. Apart from its proximity to the magazine, the factory's location was eminently suitable for a variety of other reasons: the widest range of raw materials in Australia was readily available; a good supply of labour existed nearby; the main customer was close at hand in the shape of the Victorian Defence Force, the largest such force in Colonial Australia; and, while port facilities for shipping the factory's products to the other colonies were within easy reach, the factory was at the same time sufficiently far inland to render it safe from naval bombardment. The particular development of the current EFM property as a centre of munitions production derives from its selection in the first decade of the twentieth century as the site of the Commonwealth's factory for the manufacture of cordite. Introduced in 1895 as a replacement for gunpowder, cordite was a smokeless, more powerful and more reliable propellant for firing missiles from guns. As early as 1895, the Victorian Government investigated the possibility of building a cordite factory and, the next year, an intercolonial conference of the military commandants of the Australian colonies agreed on the importance of such a factory to the capacity of Australia as a whole to defend itself. From 1901 the new Federal Government struggled with the issues of a munitions supply. For the first few years Australia's sole supplier was the first and only manufacturer, the Colonial Ammunition Company, at Footscray. In 1902 Major General Sir Edward Thomas Hutton recommended that such a factory should be part of a Central Arsenal.

Suggestions had been made in Victoria in 1896 that a change should be made to a rifle using a cordite based propellant. One consequence of this decision was the need to import both cordite and new rifles. In Victoria new .303 rifles were issued to infantry with ammunition made at the Colonial Ammunition Co. Factory. The new Short Magazine Lee-Enfield .303 was adopted in 1903 by the British Government. While the new Federal Government aimed at achieving a greater degree of self-sufficiency for the nation in the area of defence including munitions production, no progress towards the establishment of a cordite factory occurred until 1906 when investigations into cordite explosions in arsenals around the world revealed that the substance deteriorated with age and variable temperature. This finding stirred the Federal Government into action. Melbourne was selected as the site for a factory to produce cordite for small arms ammunition because it was the headquarters of Australia's defence forces and, being the centre of the nation's emerging chemical industry, could supply the necessary raw materials. For the particular location for the factory the Commonwealth settled on the disused Maribyrnong Racecourse and part of the neighbouring stud farm because of their proximity to both the existing ammunition factory at Footscray and to a plentiful supply of labour. In 1908 the Commonwealth resumed the land and commenced construction of the factory complex in 1909. The factory was designed by its newly appointed manager, Arthur Edgar Leighton, who was to become one of the leaders of the Australian munitions industry. Construction of the factory complex, which extended over the period 1909–12, was carried out by a single contractor, Richard Hamilton of Malvern and took place on the site of the former Maribyrnong Racecourse, on the western part of the current EFM site. The completion of the Maribyrnong Cordite Factory in 1912 mirrored the completion of the Lithgow Small Arms Factory in 1912, designed to produce Lee-Enfield .303 rifles, and ensured, in conjunction with the Colonial Ammunition Company's factory at Footscray, an independent national supply of arms and ammunition.

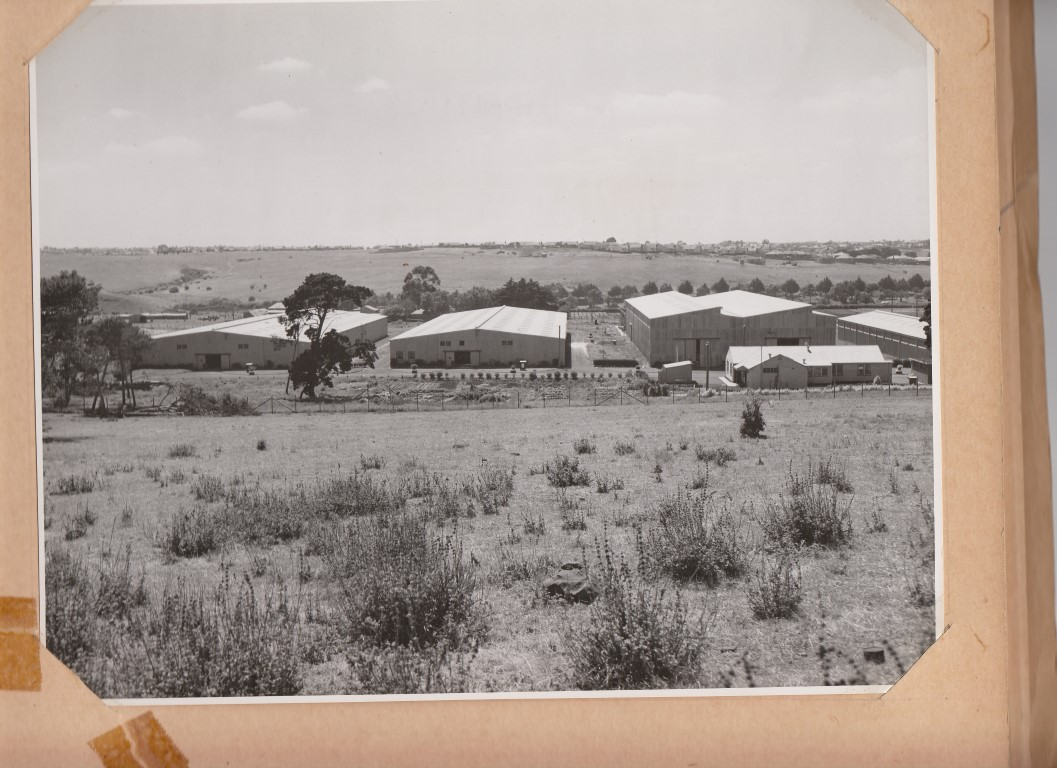
View of storehouses from Remount Hill, 1953

The military development of the eastern part of the current EFM site commenced in 1912. At that time the Army's Director of Artillery put forward a proposal that the Federal Government purchase an additional segment of the former Clarke estate and convert in into a remount depot to be used for breaking in and training horses mainly for the Royal Australian Field Artillery. The Federal Government duly purchased a parcel of land of approximately 30 acres in extent adjoining the cordite factory site and erected timber stables, exercising yards and associated structures for a Remount Depot, on the crown of the hill that became known as The Remount. The original Fisher stables (No. 248) were also incorporated into the remount depot and, in 1916, they were given a completely new roof clad in corrugated iron in place of the original slate. Barracks accommodation was also erected. The use of this section of the EFM site for remount purposes continued until 1945 when a remount unit and an army veterinary hospital were still located there.

==== World War I ====
The outbreak of World War I led to an enormous increase in the demand for cordite and other munitions, while at the same time the supply of chemicals such as glycerine, cellulose and methanol, that Australia imported in order to produce its munitions, dried up. The consequences for Maribyrnong were twofold. Unable by itself to manufacture the basic chemicals that it had formerly imported, Leighton and his Assistant Manager at Maribyrnong, (the chemical engineer Noel Brodribb, who was also to become a leading figure in the Australian munitions industry), persuaded local Australian companies to manufacture these substances and taught them how to go about it. Apart from its importance in maintaining and enhancing Australian munitions production, this stimulatory and educative role also proved a significant factor in helping to develop an industrial chemistry industry in Australia. The second major consequence of the war for Maribyrnong was a vast expansion in the range and quantity of munitions it produced. In 1915 the factory complex began to manufacture initiating explosives such as were used in small quantities in percussion caps to initiate the firing of cartridge ammunition. The first such explosive produced at Maribyrnong was fulminate of mercury. Two years later, in 1917, the complex expanded its production of cordite, moving from manufacturing the substance purely for small arms ammunition into making it for artillery shells as well. A further important development occurred in 1918 when Maribyrnong began to manufacture its own acetone from acetate of lime obtained from molasses produced at a purpose-built Commonwealth factory in Queensland. Acetone was a vital ingredient in the manufacture of cordite and one for which Australia had previously been totally reliant on imports for its supplies.

==== Inter-war years ====
In the years immediately following the end of World War I, production at Maribyrnong declined. The war years however had demonstrated to the Australian Government the need for self-reliance and readiness in the area of munitions production. This prompted the Government, in August 1921, to set up the Munitions Supply Board (MSB) charged with the responsibilities of erecting laboratories and factories for the production of munitions, maintaining scientific and technical staff and preparing a scheme for the organisation of the whole industry of the nation in time of war. With all government munitions production now placed under the control of the MSB, the Commonwealth devoted some 3,000,000 pounds to capital works at its munitions factories and laboratories in the early 1920s, an amount larger than all the other parts of the British Empire put together. The programme of works naturally extended to the explosives factory complex at Maribyrnong. In the 1920s, capital works were undertaken at the factory to make it capable of producing the many components of modern high explosive artillery shells, including their fuses and trinitrotoluene (TNT) filling. The factory soon began to produce TNT, with its first major customer being the Victorian Government which was engaged in underwater blasting at Port Phillip Heads. Such civilian use of an EFM product was another highly significant feature of the factory complex's work in the 1920s and early 1930s. Commonwealth Government policy allowed EFM to manufacture chemical products for sale in the commercial sphere where there was no source of supply from private enterprise within Australia. The only proviso was that EFM had to withdraw from the market in any particular chemical product when private enterprise commenced manufacturing it. One major effect of this policy was that, as in the war years, the Maribyrnong complex played the leading role in stimulating the Australian chemical engineering industry in the interwar period. Among the products that the EFM manufactured for sale in the 1920s were various acids, twenty-nine varieties of lead free paints and enamels, lacquers, varnishes, cements, lutes, glycerine mixtures, soap mixtures, pitch composition and drawing paste. The factory complex also produced pigmented acetate, nitrocellulose, dopes and identification colours for commercial aircraft companies and for the Royal Australian Air Force (RAAF). Under Leighton's energetic leadership the complex's range of commercial products was further expanded in the period 1930–33, with manufacture commencing of acetone solvents, collodion (gun cotton), paper cartons (target centres), TNT charges, salt cake and nitrobenzene. Such was the range of chemical processes performed by the Explosives and Factory Filling Group, as the Maribyrnong complex was then known, that it was in fact the centre of the chemical engineering industry in Australia in this era. Its chemical products were the most complex made by any chemical manufacturer in Australia, its technology was the most modern and the technology was kept up to date by a constant flow of technical information from England.

==== World War II ====
A new phase of development opened at the EFM with the Commonwealth Government's announcement in September 1933 of a major rearmament programme for Australia's defence forces. As it turned out this was to be the first of a series of five major rearmament programmes instituted in the period leading up to the outbreak of World War II, all of them aimed at modernising Australia's defences and making the nation more self-sufficient in this area. Significant impetus was given to these programmes from the latter half of 1935 following an assessment by senior defence officials that war was likely to break out in Europe and East Asia by the end of 1939. The impetus was reflected at Maribyrnong in a doubling of production output at the EFM complex each year from 1936–37 to the 1939–40. As it was, the 1933 announcement had an immediate impact on the Maribyrnong complex when the EFM was detailed to manufacture solventless cordite for big gun ammunition as used by the Royal Australian Navy (RAN) in its naval guns. Up to this point the RAN had relied completely on Britain for its supplies of solventless cordite. To house the manufacturing process for this substance, new buildings were erected at Maribyrnong and, in late 1935, the first supplies were produced. The successful manufacture of naval cordite was a considerable technical accomplishment for the EFM complex. One of the other notable achievements of the EFM in this period was its part in initiating the production of synthetic ammonia in Australia. Ammonia was essential for the production of nitric acid which was a vital ingredient in the manufacture of explosives and one for which Australia was totally reliant on imports. By the mid-1930s, Leighton, Brodribb and their colleagues at Maribyrnong were determined that this glaring gap in the nation's ability to produce all of its own explosives should be overcome. Against the opposition of Imperial Chemical Industries (ICI) in England, the EFM complex began research into the manufacture of nitrogenous products and established a pilot plant for producing nitric acid by the oxidation of ammonia. This initiative eventually forced ICI in 1939–40 to set up a factory at Deer Park in Victoria to make ammonia and nitric acid. A further noteworthy feature of the development of the EFM complex in the mid-to late-1930s was the provision of additional staff buildings to accommodate a projected major increase in the size of the factory's workforce when war broke out. As it was anticipated that a large number of women would be employed in this eventuality, specific facilities for women were built from about 1935 onward.

As anticipated, the outbreak of World War II led to a massive increase in the demand for explosives and a need for the construction of new factories in Australia to meet the demand. One of the main challenges in expanding the military explosives industry was to provide properly trained technical staff to run the new factories. In the words of David Paver Mellor's World War II Australian official history volume, The Role of Science and Industry, "It was here that the Maribyrnong Explosives Factory played a role for which it had long been planned. It possessed the only body of officers trained in the manufacture of military explosives and experienced in the techniques of filling ammunition. For the first half of the war it was the school to which staff recruited for the new factories were sent for training. Maribyrnong provided the managers for these factories and also the background of practical experience which enabled them to turn out products meeting the stringent requirements of service specifications." As the largest and longest established explosives factory in Australia, the EFM, now under the management of Arthur Albert Topp, also played the leading part in the research and development of new munitions and manufacturing processes. Again in Mellor's words, these were "...to a very large extent... pioneered, developed and brought into production at Maribyrnong. The range and diversity of manufacture and filling at this factory was unapproached by any other factory in the British Commonwealth, for it made and filled almost every type of ammunition". The expansion of the war effort led to the construction of other armaments and munitions factories based on the processes developed at EFM, including the Salisbury Explosives Factory in South Australia completed in 1940.

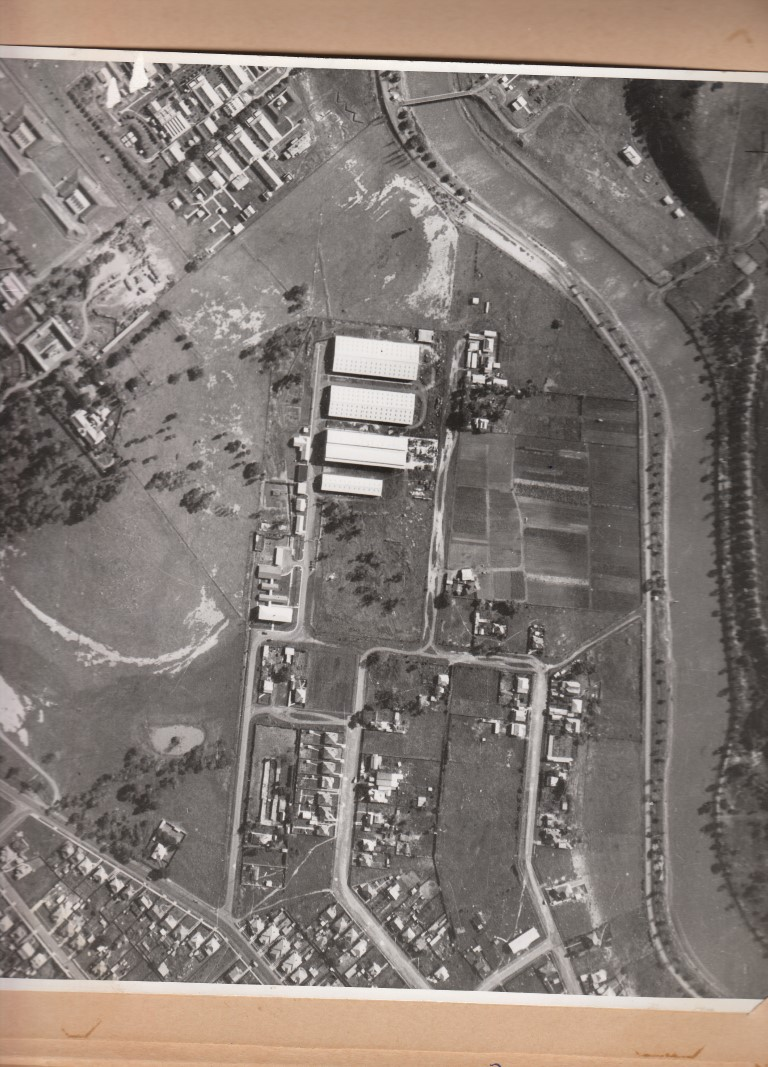
The RAN Armament Depot required an expansion to the NW of the site, seen here in 1953

By early 1941 the EFM had developed and commenced production of another initiator besides fulminate of mercury, uncoated lead azide. Later in the same year, the factory succeeded, after a lengthy research programme, in replacing cotton with paper-wood cellulose from Australian-grown pine trees to produce nitrocellulose for propellants. The EFM further succeeded in nitrating this nitrocellulose in such a way as to make it suitable for both land service and naval propellants and it was the first factory in the world to go into regular production of this form of nitrocellulose. Other pioneering work in manufacturing munitions followed. In 1942, the EFM researched and developed a new method of making cordite while a crash research and development programme at the factory enabled it, by early 1943, to produce so called flashless cordite for use by the RAN. This was the first time that this type of cordite had been manufactured in Australia. Not surprisingly, a range of new structures were erected at the EFM complex to accommodate both the production of these new munitions and an enormous expansion in the production of existing munitions. A similar building programme occurred in the ammunition filling section of the factory to cope with the vast increase in work in this area. In May 1940 the Department of Supply, under which the EFM then operated, gained approval and funding for an expansion of this part of the complex. A new area for the filling of naval mines and depth charges was consequently built on the flats within the northern loop of the river and even the high ground of Remount Hill, though not overly convenient for handling explosives, was utilised for process buildings and magazines. Apart from mines and depth charges, the work of filling numerous other types of ammunition with explosives was carried out at Maribyrnong during the war. The peak of munitions production at Maribyrnong occurred in 1942 when the complex employed over 8,000 workers. One of the most notable features of the World War II workforce was the high proportion of female employees it contained. Prior to the outbreak of the war the factory had always been staffed wholly and solely by men and this situation had even been maintained throughout World War One. However, as the EFM management had foreseen in the mid-1930s, the production of munitions at the factory could not be achieved under the conditions of a future total war without the labour of women. Thus, women were employed in large numbers at the EFM during the war and, at the time the factory reached its production peak in 1942, women formed 52 per cent of the workforce engaged in production and 45 per cent of the workforce overall. Despite the key role played by women in this vital war industry, the factory reverted to an all-male workforce at the end of the war.

Safety measures instituted at EFM extended to the built environment. Many of the production, storage and filling buildings are still surrounded by earthen or concrete blast walls which were constructed as a means of containing any accidental explosions that might occur. For transporting materials around the factory all care was taken to reduce friction and prevent the accumulation of electrostatic charges mainly through the establishment of a network of cleanways. These were slightly elevated roads made of concrete and surfaced with wood or asphalt on which ran the factory's special electrically powered rubber tyred transport vehicles. In the laying down of footpaths in the factory complex, a high proportion of gypsum was often added to the concrete in order to minimise the risk of sparks. A number of other structures still surviving on the site owe their existence to a safety issue of a somewhat different kind. As one of Australia's most important centres of munitions productions, the EFM complex was considered a prime target for possible enemy air attacks. A range of Air Raid Protection (ARP) shelters were constructed on the site, including concrete bunker style shelters and shelters for individuals. The latter consist of a concrete pipe sunk vertically into the ground and covered with a concrete slab. Zigzag slit trenches were also dug for members of the workforce to take shelter in, but these have long since been filled in. From its production peak in 1942, the output of the EFM gradually declined as other munitions factories in Australia commenced production. Activity at the factory slackened off further from late 1943 by which time the tide of war had turned decisively against the Japanese and it seemed likely that they would eventually be defeated.

==== Post-war period ====
In the post war years, the EFM complex continued to make explosives at Maribyrnong for Australia's armed forces, though on a much reduced scale. The factory was also engaged in this period in rendering safe its huge stockpile of unused wartime ammunition. It made something of a return, too, to its pre-war role of manufacturing non-munitions products for the general market. In this period, the EFM played an important role in employing post war immigrants, many of whom lived in the nearby migrant hostel. Very little building activity took place at the site during this time and what buildings were erected are typified by the instrumentation building (No. 999) a plain structure of red bricks with a shallow pitched roof. In 1960 the role of the factory changed as it became involved in the design and manufacture of plastic explosives, rocket propellants, the assembly of rocket motors and the manufacture of igniters and other explosive devices for rockets.

By the 1980s, however, it had become clear that the site could no longer be safely used for the production and filling of modern high explosives. The EFM's functions were progressively relocated to other sites and, in May 1994, the factory closed. The entire Maribyrnong site is exceedingly complex and the built environment reflects the process of organisational and operational change. Buildings from virtually every era, from 1910 to the present, exist side by side. While some new buildings have been erected and much modification carried out to existing buildings since the peak of production reached during WWII, there has been an overall reduction in the number of buildings since that time. Some demolitions have occurred as a result of changes in production requirements, but most were part of an on-going programme of decontamination and demolition leading towards redevelopment of the site.

==== 21st century ====
On 28 February 2018 and in January 2022, fire incidents damaged buildings that contained asbestos and up to 25 hectares (62 acres) of the entire (DSM) site. In both incidents plumes of smoke blanketed the suburbs of Aberfeldie and Maribyrnong, with many fire trucks and firebombing aircraft responding on scene. Many residents in southern Maribyrnong were evacuated by local authorities in fear of the fire spreading to nearby homes.

In 2022, the Department of Defence called for expressions of interest for the sale, remediation, and redevelopment of the 127.8-hectare (316-acre) DSM. A further stage of qualification was completed in September 2022. In 2024, five property development agencies were invited to submit proposals in the final stage of the open market testing process. As of April 2026, the Defence Department was evaluating proposals to determine the future of DSM. The Victorian Planning Authority assessed that the DSM has capacity for a resident population of approximately 6,900 people, 3,300 dwellings and 1,800 jobs. In the Authority's 2022 vision for DSM it noted unique characteristics and challenges, including cultural heritage, river frontage, site contamination and transport network capacity as well as expectations for public open space, community facilities and affordable housing.

== Physical description ==
The production of explosives required an isolated site with the possibility of separating the various stages of production and storage from each other for safety. The extensive flood plain of the Maribyrnong River offered the possibility of separating industrial functions in the production of cordite. The topography of the site in a loop of the Maribyrnong River was dominated at its southern end by buildings associated with the former Fisher stables and the Raleigh Estate, which occupied a ridge of high ground on the south side of the site. The production of cordite required nitroglycerin production, acid and chemical production, gun cotton production, incorporation of gun cotton and cordite with mineral jelly and acetone, pressing and reeling of cordite, drying and storage of cordite and associated areas accommodating laboratory functions and administration. In 1917 the former Fisher stables, on the high ground, were occupied by the Remount Depot, with the cordite factory approached from the south by an avenue located on the alignment of the former Maribyrnong racecourse straight, which acted as the main site alignment and planning generator. The hill (The Remount) also provided water storage for the cordite production process. The planning evident in 1917 continues to underpin a cultural landscape which comprises a number of functional areas, separated for safety by open space, which illustrate the production of cordite and chemicals and materials used in the manufacture of explosives and propellants and munitions. The former EFM complex comprised over 500 buildings at peak production.

As a manufacturing facility, EFM is characterised by a range of predominantly single storey, industrial cellular buildings, which in their architectural expression changed relatively little after 1912, and which reflect the character of similar buildings at the Lithgow Small Arms Factory. Dominant building characteristics, which create a consistent character, include the use of red-bricks, weatherboards, corrugated iron or asbestos cement cladding and roof coverings, large roofscapes, cellular or self contained building designs, dividing walls expressed externally through the roof and a scale generated by the single story nature of the majority of buildings. Pitched roofs predominate. Flat roofs are uncommon within the complex. Dividing walls, as an expression of the cellular nature of the single storey planning, are an important feature of many buildings. Explosives storage and magazines are characterised by their earth blast mounds, generally on three sides. The provision of safety for personnel during World War Two air raids is evident in the remains of ARP shelters for wardens. Archaeological sites include the Joseph Raleigh's house and the foundations of the Barracks and Stables associated with The Remount. There is limited evidence of planting except in the area of the original Administration building (346), the Mess building, and the area of the Fisher Stables and the remains of Joseph Raleigh's house and driveway. The latter includes Scots Pine, windbreak trees, associated with the Remount Depot.

The separation of functional areas required a safe transport system around the site. Initially this was achieved by hand propelled narrow gauge railway, and later by concrete roads. Elements of the rail system remain in place, including rails, turntables, cuttings and embankments, in addition to the cleanways. This transport system was complemented by major service systems including steam lines, which are major landscape features with elevated trestling and expansion loops. Earth mound blast walls within the site are functional landscape elements intrinsic to explosives establishments of this type, and which reinforce interpretation of the nature of the industrial processes.

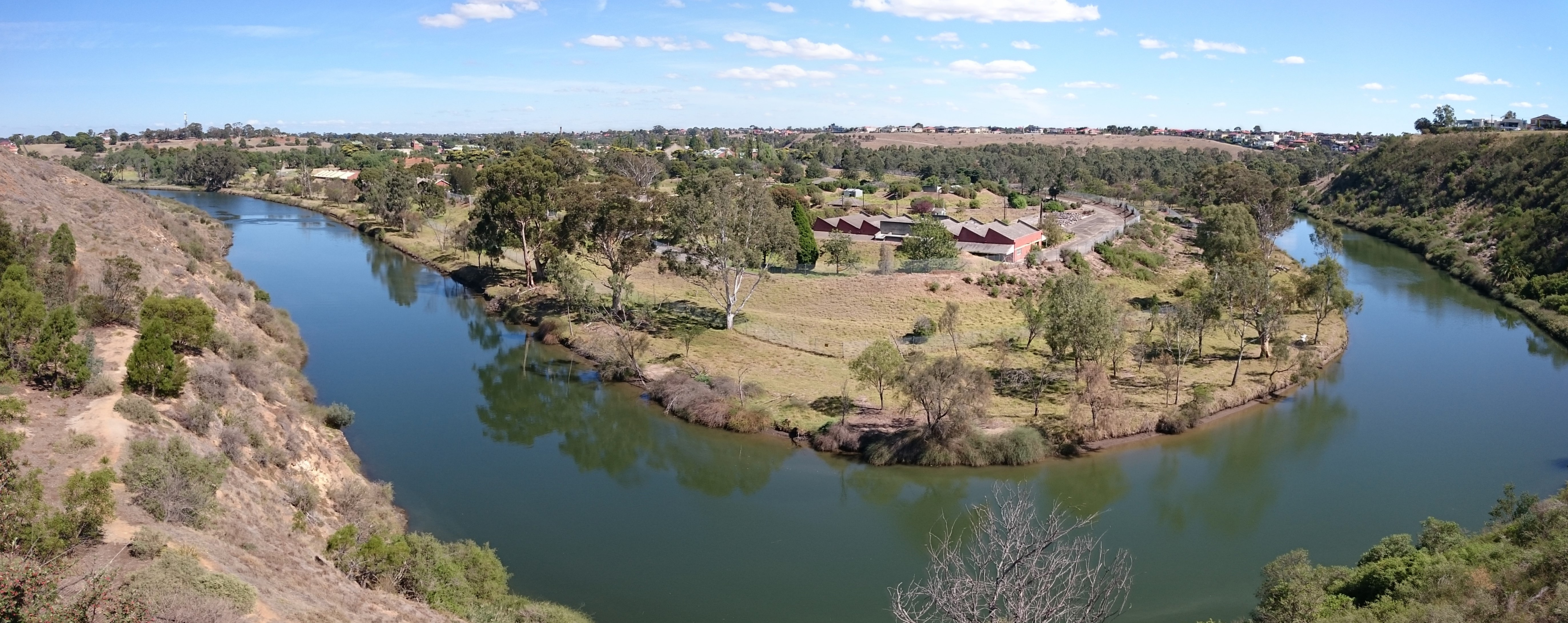
View of northern part of site from Afton Street Conservation Reserve, Essendon West. Houses on ridge in distance are in Avondale Heights

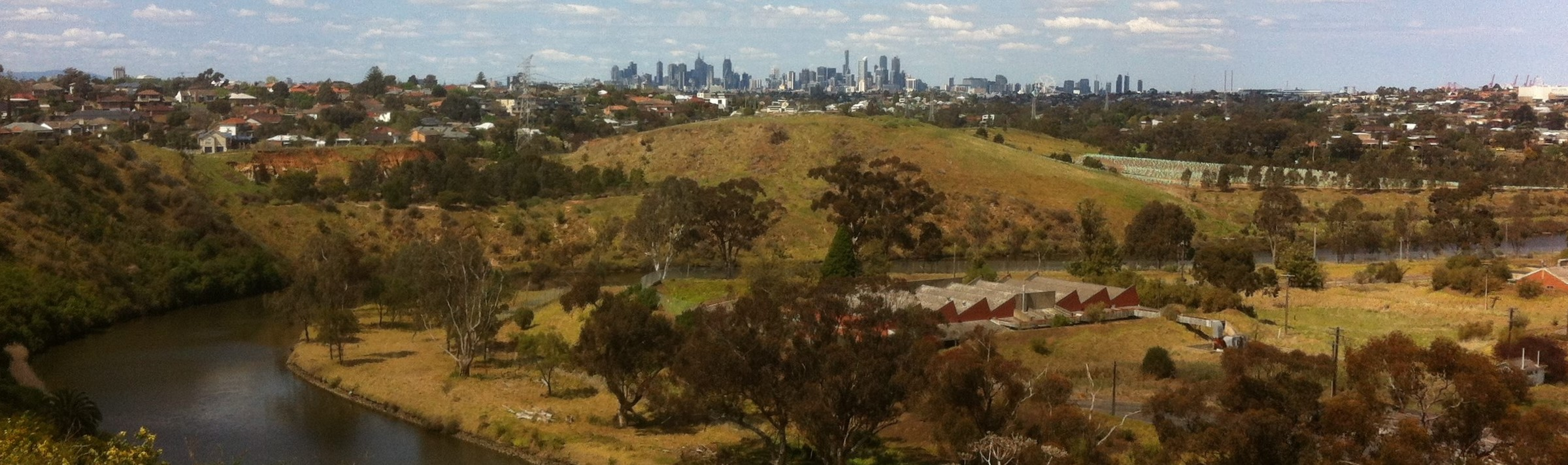
View of northern part of site from Avondale Heights. Melbourne CBD can be seen in the distance

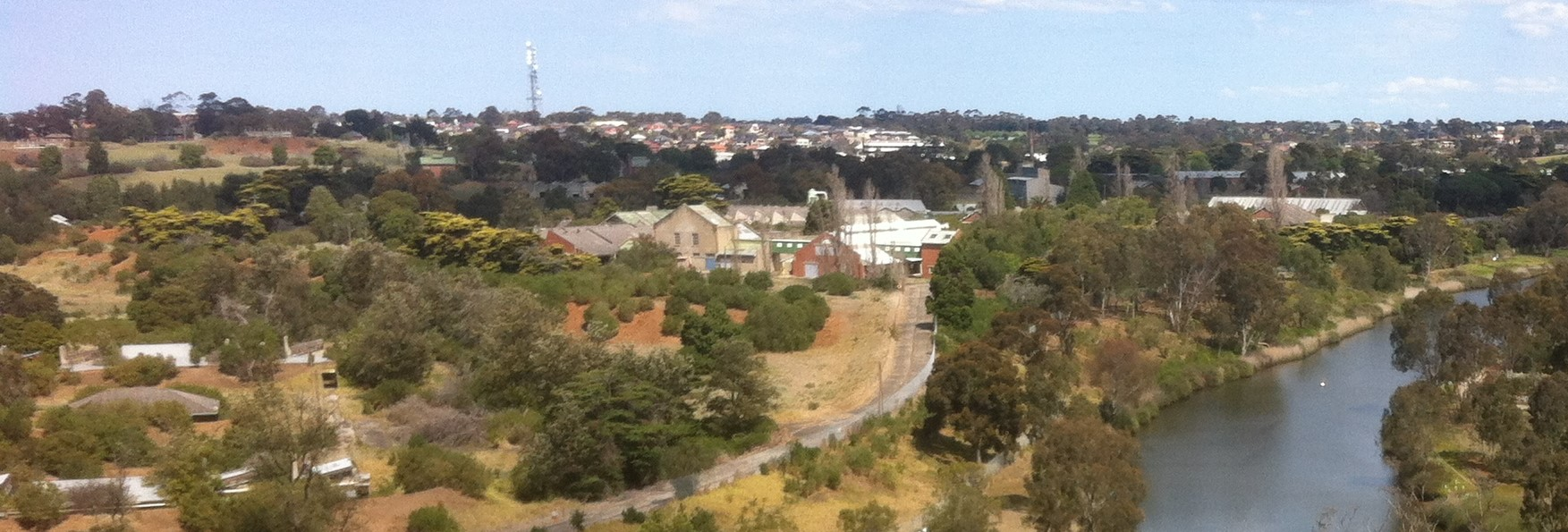
View of the western part of the site from Avondale Heights

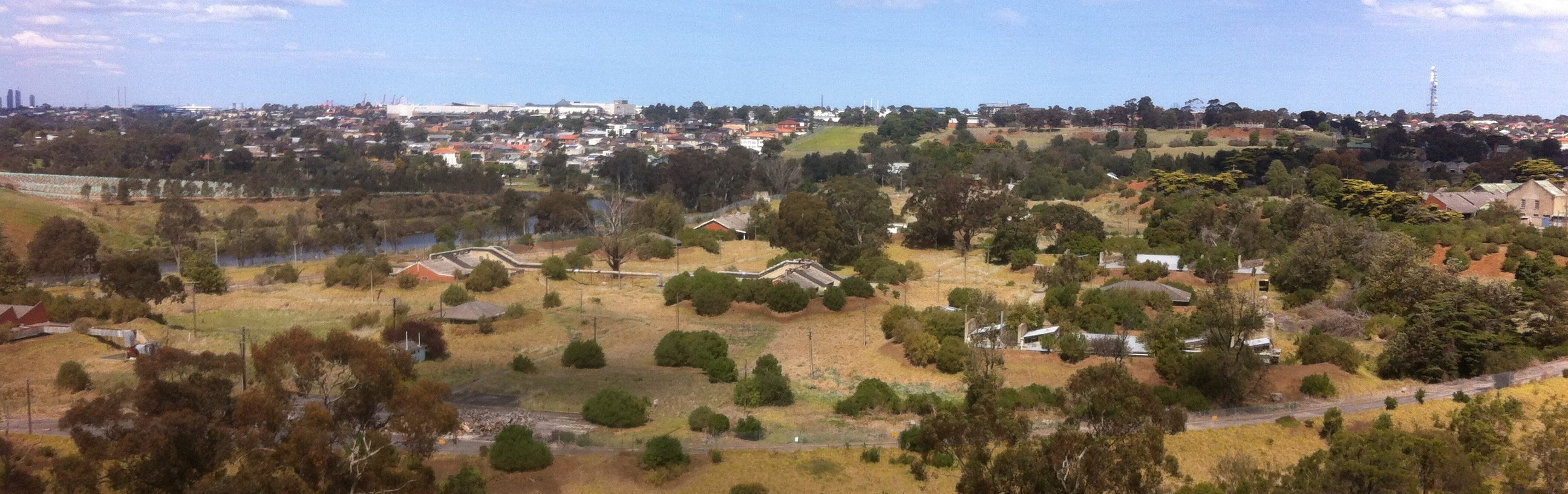
View of north-west part of site from Avondale Heights. Highpoint Shopping Centre is in the distance

The site includes the following areas:

=== Administration section ===
Includes the first buildings, buildings 1 & 2, the Offices and Laboratories, notably different in their design to the production buildings, and Building 346, the mess. This section is closely associated with the main site alignment, which develops as an urban avenue in conjunction with the associated planting, creating an introduction and focus for the site.

=== Propellant section ===
The initial focus of the factory, established to produce cordite. Includes buildings and structures associated with nitroglycerine production, acid and chemical production, gun cotton production, incorporation of gun cotton and cordite with mineral jelly and acetone, pressing and reeling the cordite and drying and storage of cordite. The original nitroglycerine plant was replaced in 1912; the replacement and a backup duplicate plant remain in place.

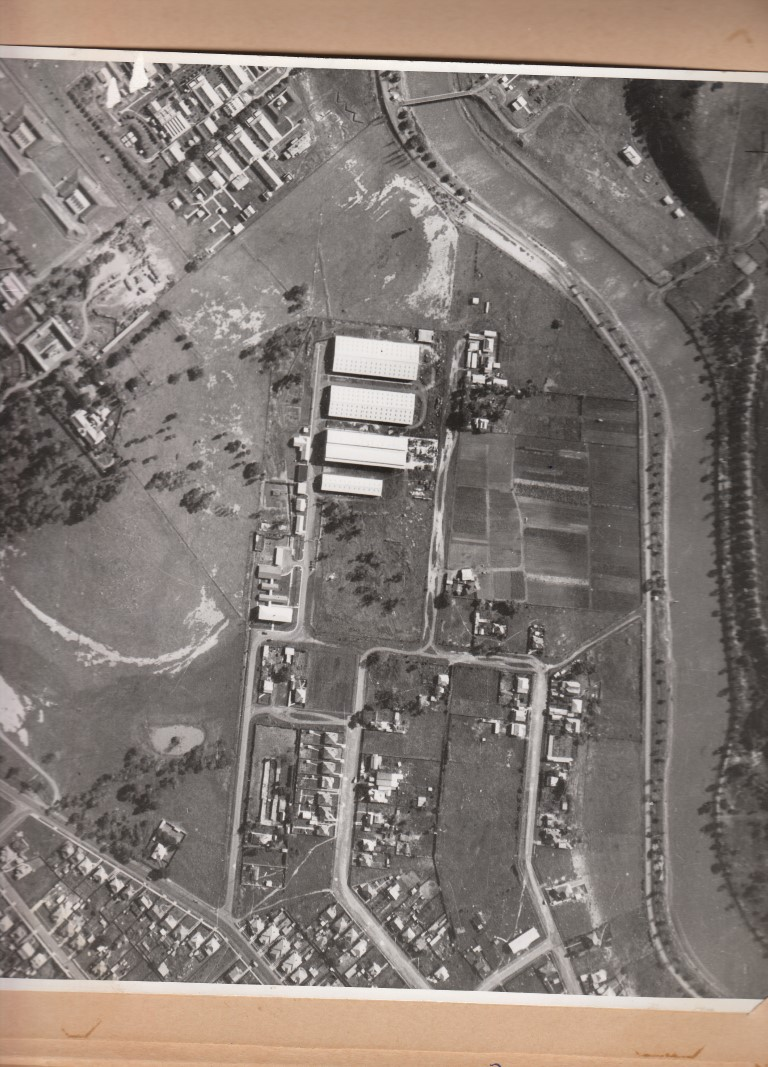
The former military bridge can be seen in this 1953 aerial photograph

=== Detonator section ===
Well separated from the explosives areas, the section was established for the production of initiators(priming caps) for shells and other explosive devices.

=== High Explosives Filling section ===
Includes buildings erected for filling mines and depth charges, in addition to explosive artillery shells.

=== Cordite, administration and workshop buildings ===
Includes production buildings and storage magazines associated with the production of naval cordite. These areas also include a range of administration and workshop buildings associated with the main entrance to the site from Cordite Avenue. The Fisher Stables, listed as indicative in the RNE at 2/12/51/2, are associated with the remains of Joseph Raleigh's house and a reported burial site for racehorses on The Remount in the northern part of the MRL(EOD) and EDE areas. This area is purported to include the burial site of General Bridges' horse, Sandy.

=== Afton Street Conservation Reserve ===
This area across the river from the main site was purchased by Moonee Valley City Council in 2003 and remediated as a conservation reserve. This area used to be a part of the DSM site, to which it was connected by a military bridge, which no longer stands. The bridge was used to transport munitions to the site for their storage, testing and disposal. Caves in the northern part of the reserve that had been filled in with earth were observed by researchers in 2005. Anecdotally, these caves were used for munitions testing.

=== Royal Australian Field Artillery barracks ===
The buildings that comprise the former Royal Australian Field Artillery (RAFA) barracks of 1911 are red brick with either slate or corrugated iron roofs grouped around the former parade ground. The accommodation buildings are on the western side of the parade ground with the administration buildings to the east and the stables, gun shed and service buildings to the north. Further north are separate residences for the commandant, captain and single officers, constructed in 1913. There is a consistent architecture throughout the RAFA Barracks which is an eclectic blend of elements of the Federation Free Classical and Arts and Crafts styles favoured by Commonwealth architect John Smith Murdoch.

== Condition and integrity ==
White Cypress-pine trees (Callitris glaucophylla) occur on the upper areas of the site as evidence of pre-European vegetation. These are estimated to be 130–220 years old with similar trees occurring on the adjacent former CSIRO land. This species is considered vulnerable in Victoria, the grouping constituting one of the southernmost populations in Australia.

Some demolition has taken place as part of an ongoing program of decontamination and demolition towards a probable disposal of the site. Demolition has also included the removal of much of the asbestos cement roof cladding.

Most of the buildings dating from the initial period of development are still standing. They include the original 1910 office and laboratories (Nos. 1 and 2) and a range of other important structures that reflect the various aspects of the manufacturing process and the working culture of the factory. Among these other structures are the boilerhouse, (No. 8) air compressor house (No. 9), strand burner house (No. 18), propellant magazine (No. 19), store (No. 20), press house (No. 21), incorporating house (No. 22), paste magazine (No. 23), plastic propellant magazine (No. 24), nitrating house (No. 54), wash water settling house (No. 55) wash house (No. 56), stores (Nos. 59–62), and charge acid house (No. 294).

A number of important buildings remain from the complex's period of expansion during World War One, 1914–1918. These include propellant stores (Nos. 63–4, pressing room (No. 65), incorporating room (No. 66), magazine (No. 70), fuse filling and assembly house (No. 73), storehouse (No. 77), assembling house (No. 78), toluene refinery (No. 84), acetate of lime building (No. 85), propellant blending room (No. 90), acetone recovery building (No. 95), weighing room (No. 101), magazine (No. 122), filling, assembly and extraction house (No. 123), rumbling house (No. 126), store (No. 127), packing room (No. 128) and magazine.

Several structures remain to represent the 1930-33 period of the EFM's activities. These structures are the fuse filling and assembly house (EFM Building No 73), solder and packing house (No 130), detonator stove building (No 131), high explosives shell filling building (No 150), and conditioning houses (Nos 224 and 225).

A number of structures dating from the period of the rearmaments programmes of the 1930s are still standing. These include the store (No. 11), rest room (No. 15), high explosive shell filling room (No. 151), change rooms (No. 295), mess hall (No. 346), labyrinth (No. 365), casualty room (No. 389) and, from the propellant (or cordite) section of the EFM complex, the weighing room (No. 323), rolling mill (No. 324), slitting and cutting building (No. 325), blocking press house (No. 326), augmentor control room (No. 327) and press house (No. 328).

Important EFM structures remaining from the World War Two period are the concrete magazines (No. 240), processing house (No. 342), inspection office (No. 394), rolling mill house (No. 400), blocking house (No. 401), pressing house (No. 402), augmentor control room (No. 403), detonator stoving building (No. 516), conditioning house (No. 519), detonator filling house (No. 569), heating building (No. 647), ARP Chief Warden's Post (unnumbered) and ARP concrete structures (unnumbered next to No. 346).

== Heritage listing ==
The Explosives Factory Maribyrnong, located in a horseshoe bend of the Maribyrnong River, below the basalt plain, is important as the seminal example in Australia of the design and development of a cordite factory, on which all later factories and production methods in Australia were based, including the Salisbury Explosives Factory in South Australia.

The EFM site, comprising the functional areas, roads, industrial buildings, administration and storage buildings, service and transport systems, blast mounds, open spaces and magazines is important as the site of the first Commonwealth munitions factory, the Cordite Factory, established by the newly formed Commonwealth Government in 1910. The manufacture of cordite and armaments had been high on the agenda for Federation and were national considerations consequent on Australia's isolation. The Lithgow Small Arms Factory began production of short magazine Lee-Enfield .303 rifles in 1912, in parallel with the Commonwealth's Maribyrnong Cordite Factory in Melbourne, which first produced cordite in 1912. These complementary munitions facilities marked the end of the use of black powder propellants by Australian troops, placed Australia on a par with other modern defence forces, ensured the future self-sufficiency of Australia's Armed Forces and demonstrated Australia's technical skills and military capabilities. The Maribyrnong factory supplied much of the cordite (propellant) used in Australian made armaments during World War I and was the seminal example on which later explosives factories were based, including the Salisbury Explosives Factory in South Australia completed in 1940, and which with Maribyrnong played a key role in World War Two, when munitions production reached its peak. Although the quantity of material produced at the Maribyrnong factory was much smaller than that produced at such emergency mass production factories as Albion, it included a much wider range of products. Maribyrnong also served as the parent factory for other armament factories during World War Two and was responsible for experimentation, specifications and standards of manufacture. The level of technological exploration and the standard of Australian developed manufacturing equipment was so high that Australia began exporting to countries such as Britain which had previously supplied much of the necessary equipment and training. The technical standards achieved during the 1920s and 1930s, and which underpinned its later technological role, gave the factory leadership in the chemical engineering industry in Australia during the interwar period.

The factory is an important reminder of the war years, in particular World War I, when there was an influx of workers into the area to staff the munitions factories. The factory also serves as a reminder of the change in the nature of the workforce during this period when women represented approximately half of the Maribyrnong workforce and then the return to an all male workforce after the war.

The EFM site is important for its association with the history and development of horse racing in Victoria. This is implicit in the alignment of the main avenue, which reflects the main straight of the former, private Maribyrnong Racecourse, associated with the Cox Brothers 1892–1901, and the area of The Remount, which includes the former Fisher Stables, erected 1888–89 by Charles Brown Fisher, the foundations of the former Raleigh homestead and a burial site for racehorses. The use of the Fisher Stables as focus of a Remount Depot before the First World War, and the erection of barracks accommodation for the Royal Australian Field Artillery, increased the Army's association with the Maribyrnong River.

The factory expanded throughout its existence into a densely developed cultural landscape area containing over 500 structures. These structures, including magazines, processing plants and support systems, illustrate much of the development of explosives technology and manufacturing processes and are important for the considerable information they contribute to an understanding of the growth of the armaments industry in Australia under the Commonwealth government.

The EFM site is important in demonstrating the principal characteristics of explosives factories developed for the production of cordite and cordite based munitions. These characteristics include the separation of functions, including the use of containing blast mounds and the use of single-storey, cellular industrial buildings, linked by service and transport systems designed to maximise safety.

The site of the Raleigh homestead is important for its association with George Petty who, in 1868, purchased the property from Charles Brown Fisher, and ran the property successfully as a thoroughbred horse stud. The Maribyrnong Stud became an important name in Melbourne racing circles. The Fisher Stables, erected 1888–89, are important for their close association with the Fisher family which bought Petty's stud and from 1875 to the mid-1890s ran a successful stud farm for racehorses on Joseph Raleigh's former property, building on the reputation established by George Petty. The site of the cordite factory is associated with the Cox brothers who established a private racecourse, the Maribyrnong Racecourse, in 1892 and which ran until 1901.

== Historical images ==
All historical images have been sourced by the Australian War Memorial:

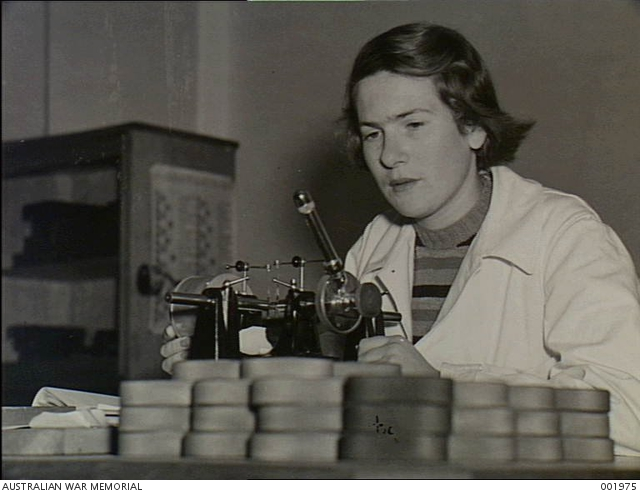
Testing a screw gauge for a naval fuse

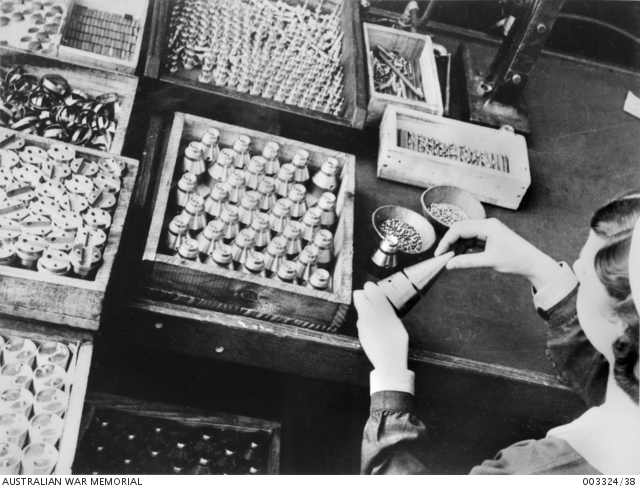
Assembling fuses for shells

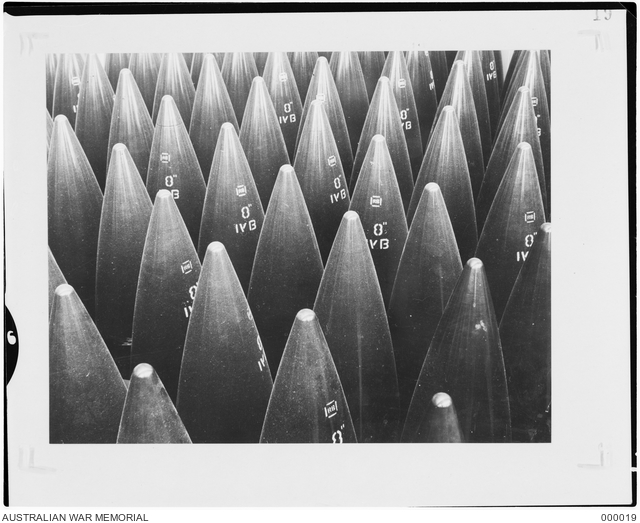
8 inch naval shells

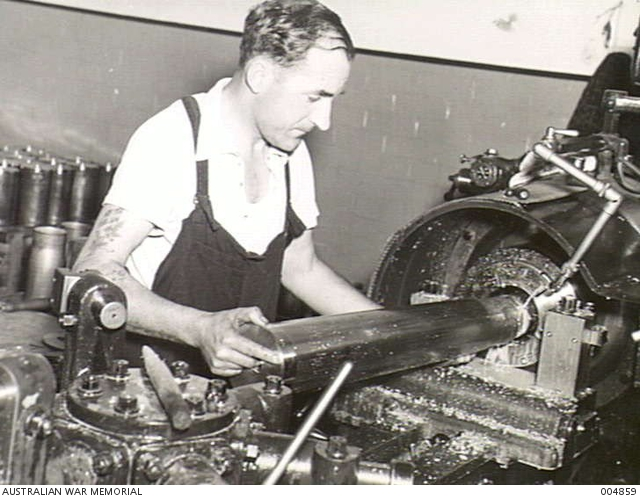
Worker making a shell case on a turret-headed lathe

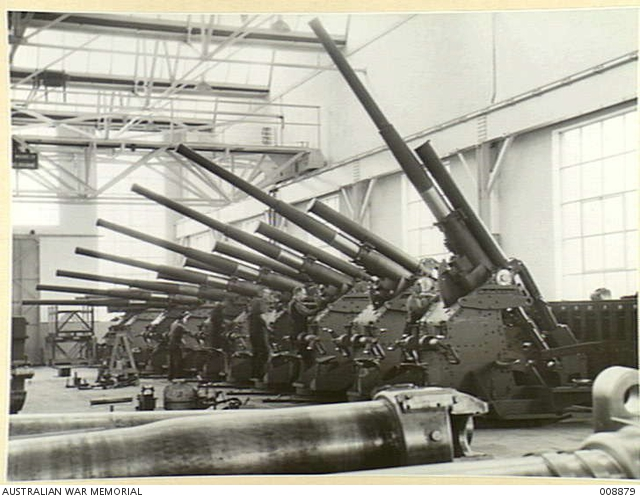
3.7 inch anti-aircraft guns undergoing final assembly

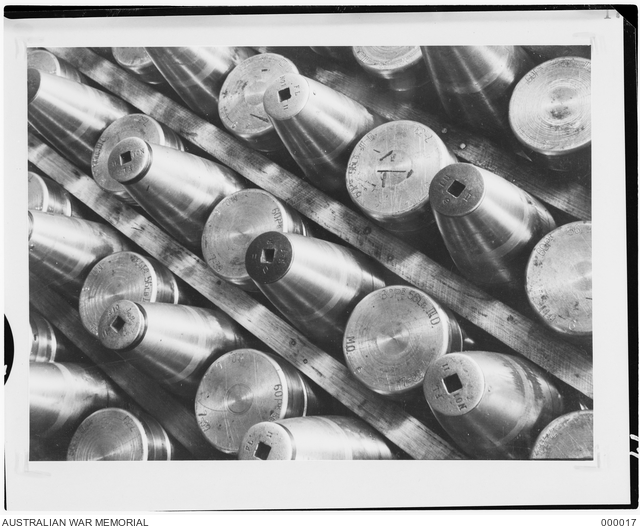
60 pounder shells

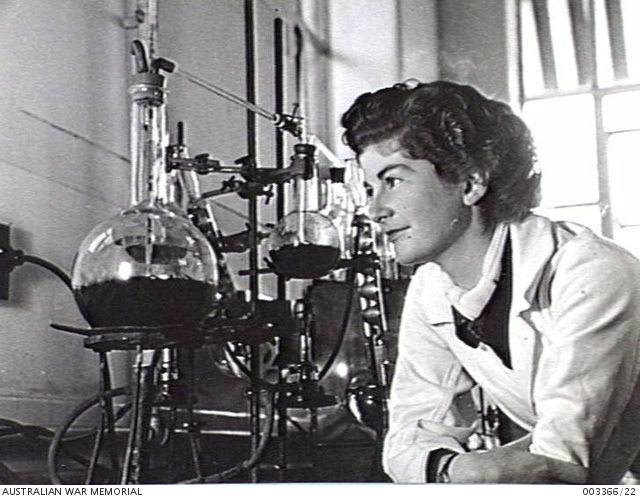
A female technician heat-testing a chemical used in explosives manufacture

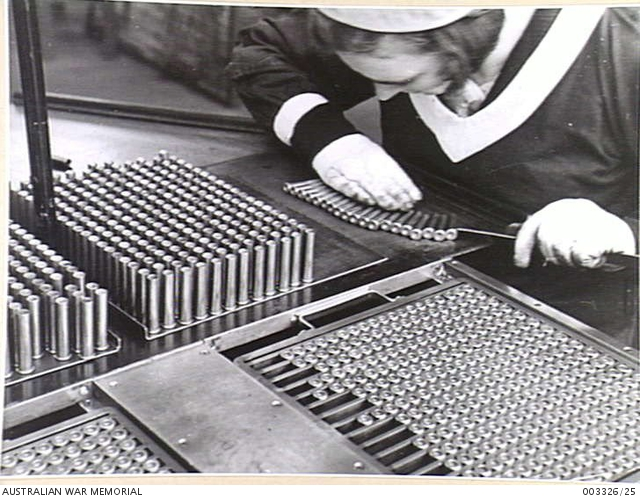

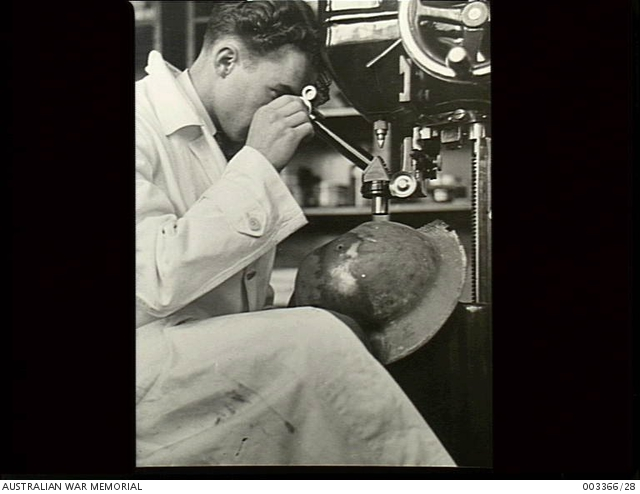
A make technician examining a damaged steel helmet

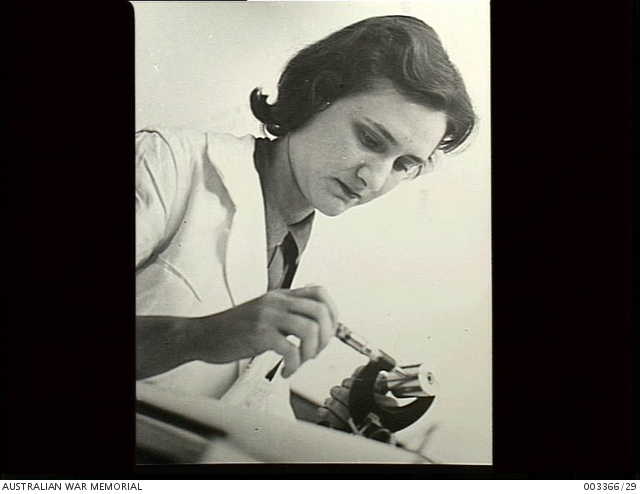
A female technician measuring a plug gauge for a mine

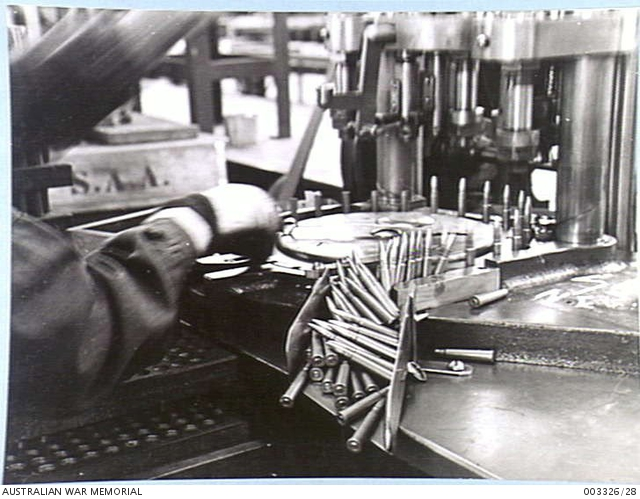
Making rifle cartridges

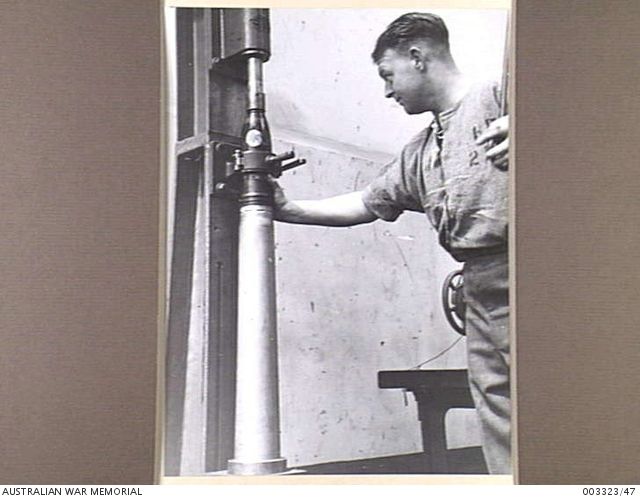
Assembling a star shell

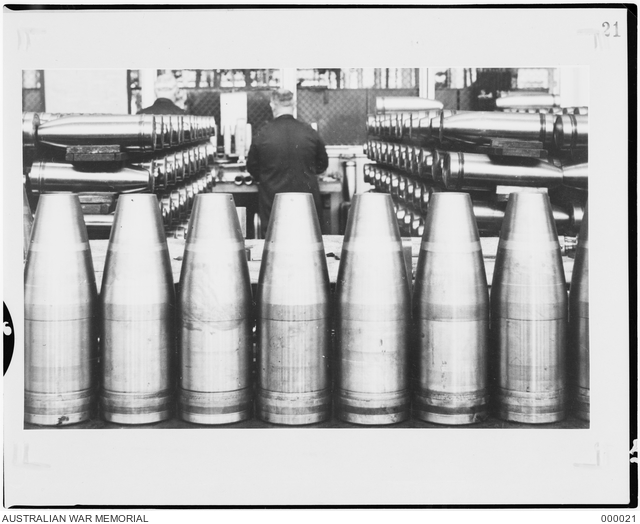
Inspection of shells

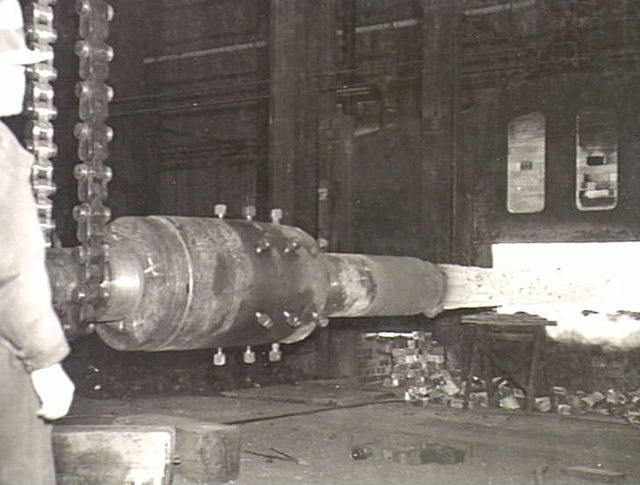
The barrel of a 3.7 inch anti-aircraft gun being drawn from the furnace

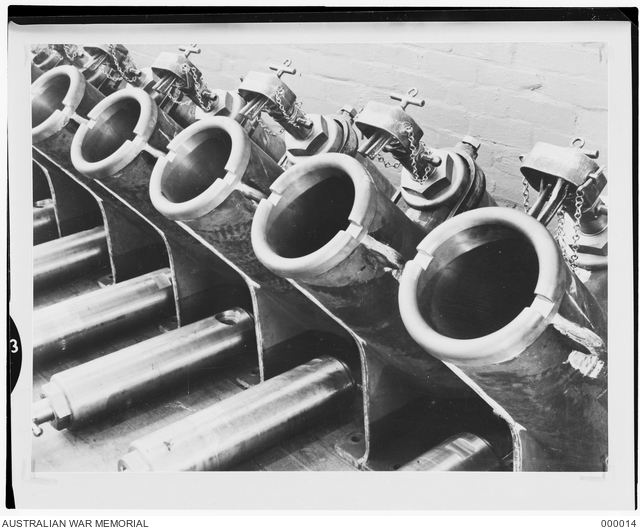
Depth charge throwers

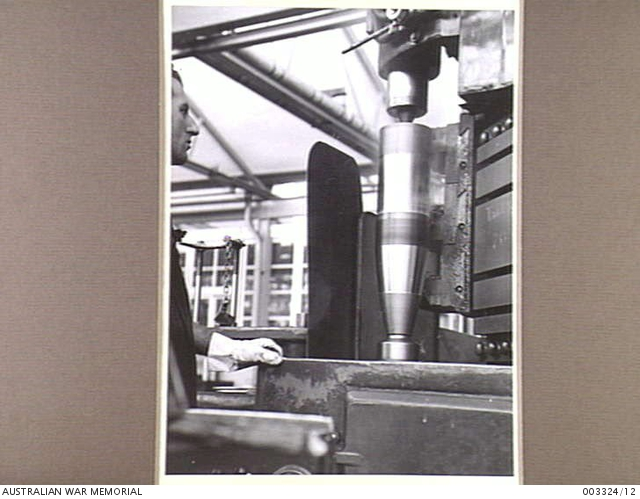
A lathe for machining 6 inch shells

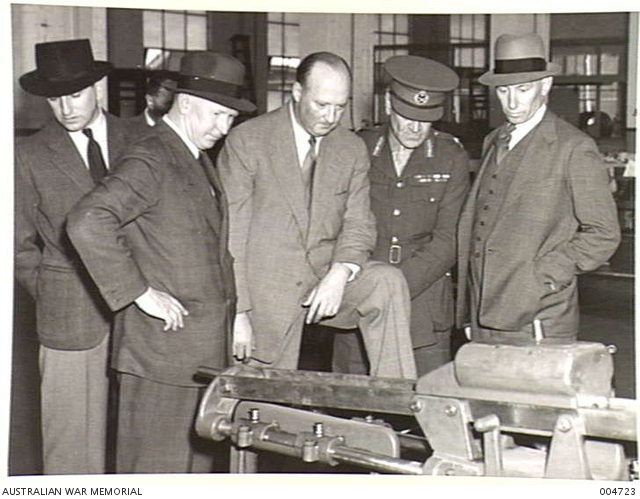
A visit from a British supply mission

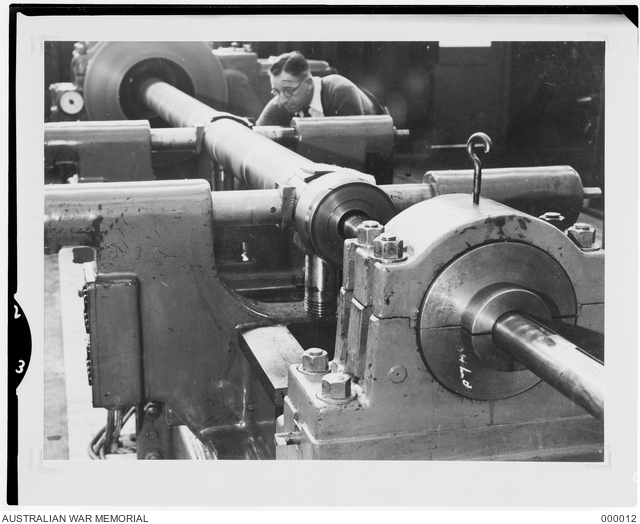
Boring a gun barrel

== Present day conditions ==
These images were taken in 2022 with authorisation from the landowner and have been sourced from Wikimedia Commons.

Timber corridor

Red brick building

Service desk

Damaged corridor

Partial site map

== See also ==
- Commonwealth Heritage List places in Victoria
- List of places on the Victorian Heritage Register in the City of Maribyrnong
- History of thoroughbred racing in Australia
