= Maribyrnong, Victoria =

Suburb of Melbourne, Victoria, Australia

Maribyrnong
- Suburb
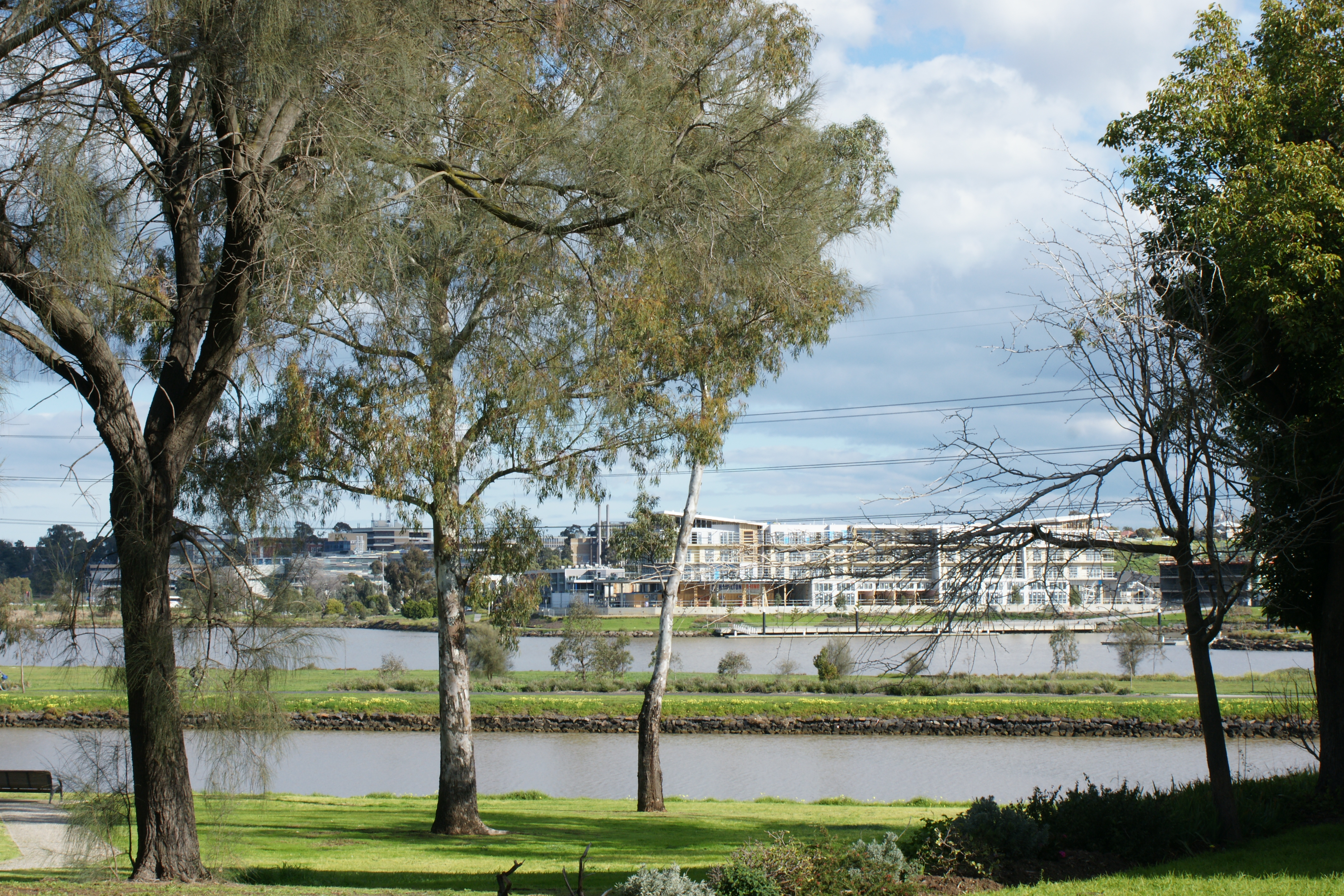
- Maribyrnong, Victoria

- Interactive map of Maribyrnong
- Coordinates: 37.770°S 144.893°E
- Country: Australia
- State: Victoria
- City: Melbourne
- LGA: City of Maribyrnong
- Location: 8 km (5.0 mi) from Melbourne

Government
  - State electorate: Footscray
  - Federal division: Fraser

Area
  - Total: 5.5 km^{2} (2.1 sq mi)
- Elevation: 38 m (125 ft)

Population
  - Total: 12,573 (2021 census)
  - Density: 2,286/km^{2} (5,920/sq mi)
- Postcode: 3032
- Mean max temp: 19.7 °C (67.5 °F)
- Mean min temp: 9.3 °C (48.7 °F)
- Annual rainfall: 553.3 mm (21.78 in)
Suburbs around Maribyrnong
Essendon West	Aberfeldie	Moonee Ponds
Avondale Heights	Maribyrnong	Ascot Vale
Maidstone	Maidstone	Footscray

Maribyrnong (/mærəbənɒŋ/) is an inner suburb in Melbourne, Victoria, Australia, 8 km (5.0 mi) northwest of the Melbourne central business district, located within the City of Maribyrnong local government area. Maribyrnong recorded a population of 12,573 at the 2021 census.

Located in the River Ward of the City of Maribyrnong, Maribyrnong takes its name from the Maribyrnong River which bounds the suburb to the north and east. Its other borders are Williamson Road, Rosamond Road, Mephan Street and Owen Street to the south.

Maribyrnong contains Highpoint Shopping Centre, one of Australia's largest shopping centres.

== History ==
Maribyrnong lies on the traditional land of the Wurundjeri Woi Wurrung and Bunurong peoples of the Kulin Nation. Aboriginal people have lived in the Maribyrnong River valley for at least 40,000 years, and the name Maribyrnong derives from the phrase 'Mirring-gnay-bir-nong', meaning 'I can hear a ringtail possum'.

A Maribyrnong Post Office opened on 19 March 1881 and closed in 1887. It reopened in 1912 and closed again in 1975. There used to be an Australia Post shop at Highpoint Shopping Centre but it closed in May 2024.

Maribyrnong is home to the Department of Defence ammunitions factory and storage facility. Although many of the buildings are now disused, the site has now been earmarked for development by the State Government for housing and low density commercial infrastructure.

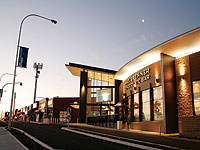
Highpoint Shopping Centre

== Education ==
Maribyrnong contains several schools, both Catholic and State Government run. Maribyrnong College (est 1958) is the sole high school in the suburb, which recently underwent significant renovations by the State Government. St Margarets Catholic Primary School and nearby Footscray North Primary School both cater for primary school aged children in the area.

There are also kindergarten and child care centres within Maribyrnong.

== Demographics ==
The most common ancestries in Maribyrnong were Chinese 13.3%, English 12.8%, Australian 11.8%, Vietnamese 10.7%, and Italian 6.5%. The most common countries of birth outside Australia were Vietnam 10.1%, China (excludes SARs and Taiwan) 5.8%, India 3.4%, Malaysia 1.6%, and New Zealand 1.5%.

45.1% of people only spoke English at home. Other languages spoken at home included Vietnamese 12.5%, Mandarin 6.7%, Cantonese 5.4%, Italian 2.8%, and Spanish 2.1%.

The most common responses for religion in Maribyrnong were No Religion 30.8%, Catholic 27.8%, Not stated 10.0%, Buddhism 9.4%, and Eastern Orthodox 4.4%.

== Flora and fauna ==
Many native species exist along the Maribyrnong River. Some species thrive in the area. The most noticeable are;

- Rainbow lorikeet
- Common brushtail possum
- Flying foxes or fruit bat Pteropus
- Cockatoo

Maribyrnong has many parks mostly near the Maribyrnong River. These reserves are typically unsuitable for development due to the risk of flooding and have been established as gardens and reserves for locals to enjoy.

== Places of worship ==
There is only one place of worship throughout the entire suburb of Maribyrnong – a church in the Roman Catholic tradition. St Margaret's, which is the namesake of the Catholic primary school, is part of the Parish of Ascot Vale and shares the same priest which conducts services at St Mary's in Ascot Vale.

== Climate ==
Climate data for Maribyrnong Explosives Factory
Month	Jan	Feb	Mar	Apr	May	Jun	Jul	Aug	Sep	Oct	Nov	Dec	Year
Mean daily maximum °C (°F)	26.0 (78.8)	25.3 (77.5)	23.9 (75.0)	19.7 (67.5)	16.6 (61.9)	13.8 (56.8)	13.5 (56.3)	14.7 (58.5)	17.2 (63.0)	19.4 (66.9)	21.7 (71.1)	24.4 (75.9)	19.7 (67.5)
Mean daily minimum °C (°F)	13.4 (56.1)	13.6 (56.5)	12.6 (54.7)	9.9 (49.8)	7.7 (45.9)	5.9 (42.6)	5.5 (41.9)	5.8 (42.4)	7.0 (44.6)	8.6 (47.5)	9.9 (49.8)	12.1 (53.8)	9.3 (48.7)
Average precipitation mm (inches)	40.6 (1.60)	40.8 (1.61)	40.7 (1.60)	46.3 (1.82)	49.4 (1.94)	39.0 (1.54)	40.0 (1.57)	45.8 (1.80)	51.9 (2.04)	57.7 (2.27)	53.3 (2.10)	48.2 (1.90)	553.9 (21.81)
Average precipitation days	5.0	5.4	7.1	9.0	11.7	11.2	12.1	12.0	11.3	11.5	9.8	7.8	113.9

== Sports ==
=== Maribyrnong Aquatic Centre ===
The Maribyrnong Aquatic Centre was established in 2006.

=== Tracey's Speedway ===
Tracey's Speedway (formerly Kirjon Speedway) on the Maribyrnong Reserve on Horetense Street was utilised as a racetrack for various motor sport events. It opened in 1946 and closed in 1964. There was a motorcycle speedway track located at Tracey's Speedway and it hosted significant events, including the Australian Solo Championship in 1947 and 1950.

Still located at the ground are two free standing grandstands which have been refurbished at various times. In most cases the stands are rarely used for spectator events, and instead act as changing rooms for local sports clubs which use the indoor facilities. Today the ground acts as a soccer pitch during winter months, and is also utilised by St Margaret's Primary School for Australian rules football matches.

== Transport ==
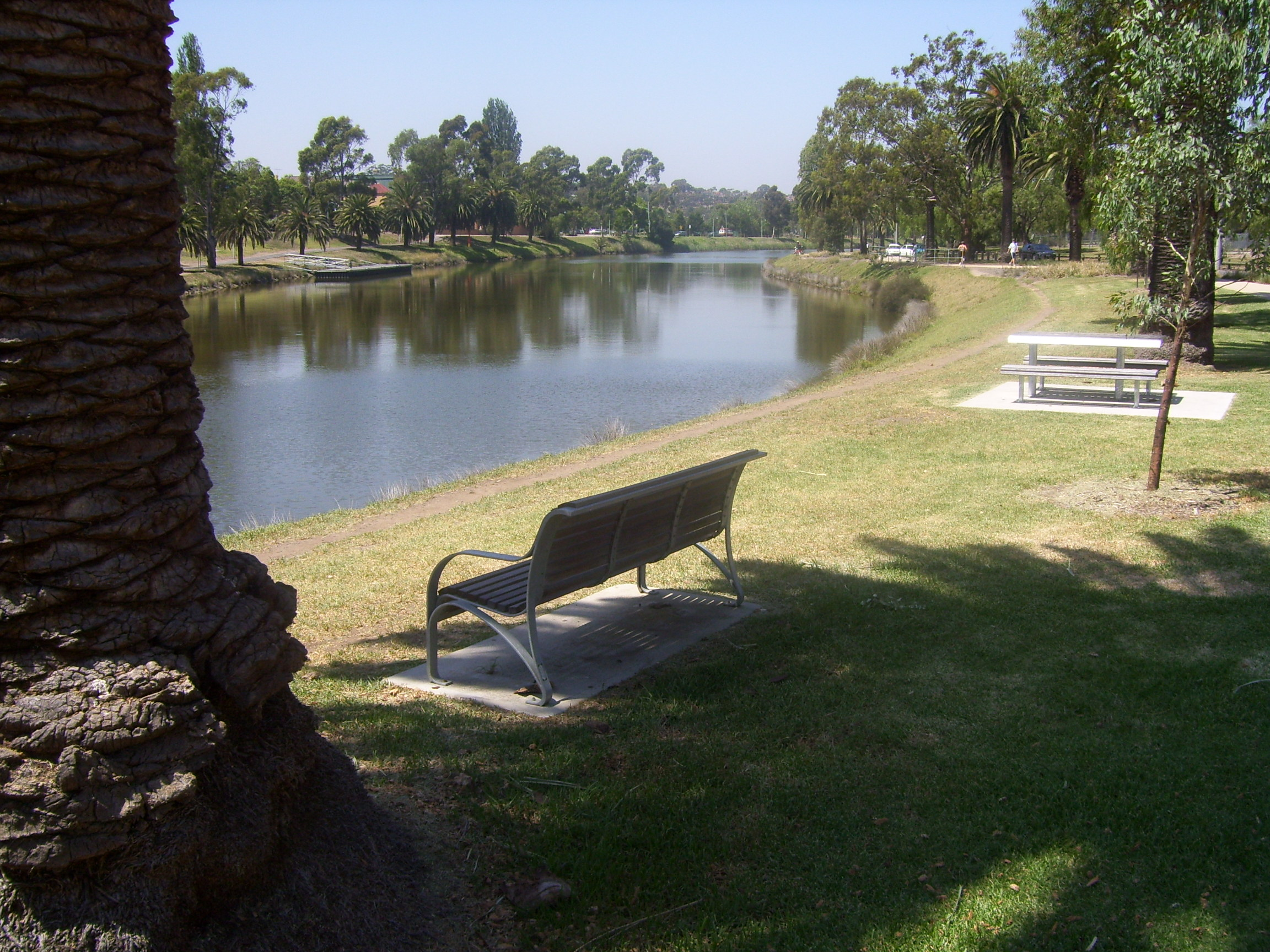
The Maribyrnong river from the suburb of Maribyrnong

=== Trains ===
No trains run through the suburb. The nearest train stations are Ascot Vale on the Craigieburn line, Footscray on the Sunbury, Werribee and Williamstown lines and West Footscray on the Sunbury line.

=== Tram ===
Yarra Trams operates two tram routes through Maribyrnong:

- Route 57 provides public transport from Flinders Street station (Elizabeth and Flinders Streets) in the city to West Maribyrnong, running through Ascot Vale, Flemington and North Melbourne.
- Route 82 provides public transport from Moonee Ponds Junction to Footscray (Leeds and Irving Streets). It is one of only two Melbourne tram routes which does not travel through the Melbourne CBD.

=== Buses ===
There are also several bus routes that pass through Maribyrnong, many of which terminate at Highpoint Shopping Centre. The introduction of Melbourne's first orbital bus line, SmartBus route 903, runs just north of Maribyrnong along Buckley Street in Essendon.

Bus routes running through Maribyrnong include:

- 215 Caroline Springs ↔ Highpoint SC
- 223 Yarraville ↔ Highpoint SC
- 406 Keilor East ↔ Footscray via Avondale Heights and Maribyrnong (Night Network)
- 407 Highpoint SC ↔ Avondale Heights via Maribyrnong
- 408 St Albans Station ↔ Highpoint SC via Sunshine Station
- 409 Yarraville ↔ Highpoint SC via Footscray
- 468 Essendon ↔ Highpoint SC via Maribyrnong

== Walking and cycling ==
The suburb adjoins the Maribyrnong River Trail which is used by commuting and recreational cyclists along the Maribyrnong River. There are also numerous bike and walking trails which link the suburb to various other suburbs and take in some of the western suburbs greatest natural beauties, such as Pipemakers Park, Afton Street Conservation Reserve and Footscray Park.

In 2020, the Maribyrnong City Council implemented a 10-year strategy to motivate locals to ride their bikes more in their daily activities by developing infrastructures and public education.

== Heritage sites ==
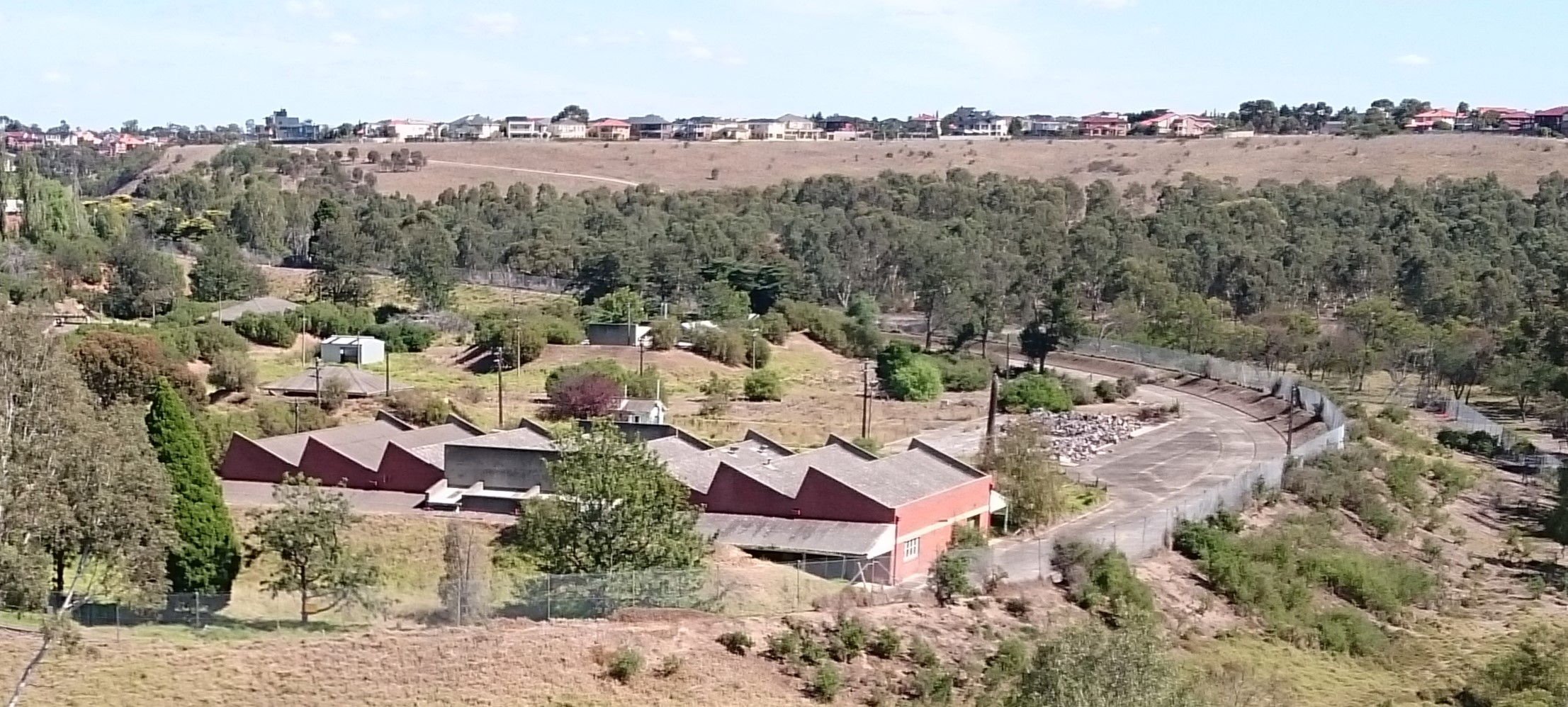
Part of the Defence Explosive Factory Maribyrnong

Maribyrnong contains a number of heritage-listed sites, including:

- Defence Explosive Factory Maribyrnong (EFM) on Cordite Avenue, listed on the Commonwealth Heritage List
  - Royal Australian Field Artillery Barracks, on Wests Road and Waterford Avenue and part of the EFM, listed on the Victorian Heritage Register (VHR)
- Jack's Magazine, off La Scala Avenue, listed on the VHR
- Maribyrnong tram substation, at 149A and 149B Raleigh Road, listed on the VHR
- Pipemakers Park Complex, at 2 Van Ness Avenue, listed on the VHR

== Recent developments ==
Despite being an inner city suburb, like many western suburbs, there are significant areas of land within Maribyrnong that have not yet been developed. Mostly owned by the Federal Government for the Department of Defence, the land is now seen as a prime opportunity for housing developments. The most notable development recently under construction is the Delfin Lend Lease Edgewater Estate, located near Highpoint on Gordon Street, which takes in city views and is adjacent to the historic Jack's Magazine.

The largest development to be announced by the State Government is the 128 hectare Maribyrnong Explosives Factory site, bounded by the Maribyrnong River. 3,000 new homes are expected to be built, along with open parkland, shops and the inclusion of many decades old defence buildings in keeping with heritage. Construction was expected to commence in 2012 but has not yet started, the project should take 10 – 15 years to be fully completed.

== See also ==
- City of Footscray – Parts of Maribyrnong were previously within this former local government area.
- City of Sunshine – Parts of Maribyrnong were previously within this former local government area.
