= Jock Menzies =

Australian rules footballer (1887–1967)

Personal information
- Full name: John Menzies
- Born: 31 October 1887; Port Melbourne, Victoria
- Died: 14 May 1967 (aged 79); Essendon West, Victoria
- Original team: Port Melbourne Juniors
- Height: 169 cm (5 ft 7 in)
- Weight: 73 kg (161 lb)

Playing career^{1}
Years	Club	Games (Goals)
1913	St Kilda	4 (1)
- ^{1} Playing statistics correct to the end of 1913.

John Menzies (31 October 1887 – 14 May 1967) was an Australian rules footballer who played with St Kilda in the Victorian Football League (VFL).

== Family ==
The son of Andrew Constable Menzies (1858–1939), and Williamina Menzies (1858-1919), née Smith, John Menzies was born at Port Melbourne, Victoria on 31 October 1887.

He married Elsie Louise Martin (1886-1966) on 5 September 1922. They had one child: a daughter, Dorothy Elsie Menzies (1924-2023), later, Mrs. Kenneth David Gould.

== Football ==
On 23 April 1913 he was cleared from Port Melbourne to St Kilda.

=== St Kilda (VFL) ===
Menzies made his debut, as the resting forward-pocket rover, for St Kilda, against South Melbourne, at the Lake Oval, on 26 April 1913.

=== Port Melbourne (VFA) ===
On 28 May 1914 Menzies was cleared from St Kilda to Port Melbourne. He played in 8 games, at centre half-forward, in the 1914 season, kicking 4 goals.

== Military service ==
He enlisted on 15 September 1914, and served overseas with the Australian Army Medical Corps of the First AIF. He was wounded twice, in action — on 3 May 1915, and on 21 August 1915 — while serving in the Dardanelles campaign, and returned to Australia on HMAT A29 Suevic, arriving in Melbourne on 5 January 1919.

== Death ==
He died at West Essendon on 14 May 1967.
