= Maribyrnong tram substation =

Historical electrical tram substation in Melbourne, Victoria, Australia

- Location of the substation in Melbourne
- Interactive map of Maribyrnong tram substation
- 37°46′14″S 144°53′05″E
- Type: Electrical substation (former)
- Location: 149A and 149B Raleigh Road, Maribyrnong, Melbourne, Victoria, Australia

History
- Construction commenced: 1941
- Built: 1942; 84 years ago
- Built by: Weavell & Keast
- Built for: Melbourne & Metropolitan Tramways Board
- Decommissioned: 2005

Site notes
- Material: Reinforced concrete
- Condition: abandoned
- Current use: vacant
- Owner: Yarra Trams
- Public access: No

Victorian Heritage Register
- Official name: Maribyrnong tram substation
- Type: Registered place
- Criteria: A, B
- Designated: 12 December 2013
- Reference no.: H2321
- Heritage overlay no.: HO208
- Category: Transport - Tramways

The Maribyrnong tram substation is a former electrical substation located near Raleigh Road in Maribyrnong, an inner western suburb of Melbourne, in Victoria, Australia. The substation was completed in 1942 on behalf of the Melbourne & Metropolitan Tramways Board.

Located on the traditional lands of the Wurundjeri, the former substation was added to the Victorian Heritage Register on 12 December 2013 in recognition of its historical and architectural significance. On the same date, the Victorian Government added substations at Carlton and Camberwell, and former substations at Ascot Vale, Brunswick, Elsternwick, and South Yarra to the same heritage register.

== History ==
Maribyrnong was the centre of Australia's munitions manufacturing industry during World War II. Key sites included the Explosive Factory Maribyrnong (EFM) on Raleigh Road, the Ordnance Factory in Wests Road, and the Ammunition Factory (ADI) in Gordon Street. At the beginning of the war only bus transport was available for the factory workers. The number of employees increased greatly following the entry of Japan into the war in 1941, and by 1942 was more than 23,000.

To ease the transport difficulties the Australian Government decided to subsidise the extension of the existing tram lines. In 1940 the Melbourne & Metropolitan Tramways Board (M&MTB) extended the existing line from Maribyrnong Road across the Maribyrnong River to Cordite Avenue to serve the EFM, and then along Wests Road to the Ordnance Factory. In 1941 a new line was completed running from Ballarat Road along Gordon Street to the Ammunition Factory, and in 1942 another new line was built from Moonee Ponds to the west end of Maribyrnong Road.

A new electrical substation was constructed at Maribyrnong to provide power for the trams on the new lines. Both the siting and the form of the building provided protection against possible air raids, and the former substation is difficult to see in contemporary times. It was built against the rear wall of an abandoned quarry and had a roof designed with no straight lines in order to resemble a water feature when viewed from the air. The contract was awarded to the builders Weavell & Keast in November 1941, the contract price being A£4,437, with amendments for camouflaging costing an extra A£210.

The former substation was decommissioned in 2005 and a new substation was constructed nearby.

== Description ==
The Maribyrnong tram substation is a steel-framed reinforced concrete building with a flat concrete roof which has an irregular outline and irregularly shaped cut-outs within it. It was built at the bottom of an abandoned quarry. Corrugated iron was laid over the concrete roof, covering the cut-out sections. To conceal its function, from the air, the former substation appeared to be a pool of water at the bottom of the quarry. The concrete walls separating the external transformer bays also have curved edges. The building retains some original equipment, including mercury arc rectifiers, transformers and switching equipment.

== See also ==
- Timeline of trams in Melbourne
- List of places on the Victorian Heritage Register in the City of Maribyrnong
