= Avondale Heights =

- Suburb
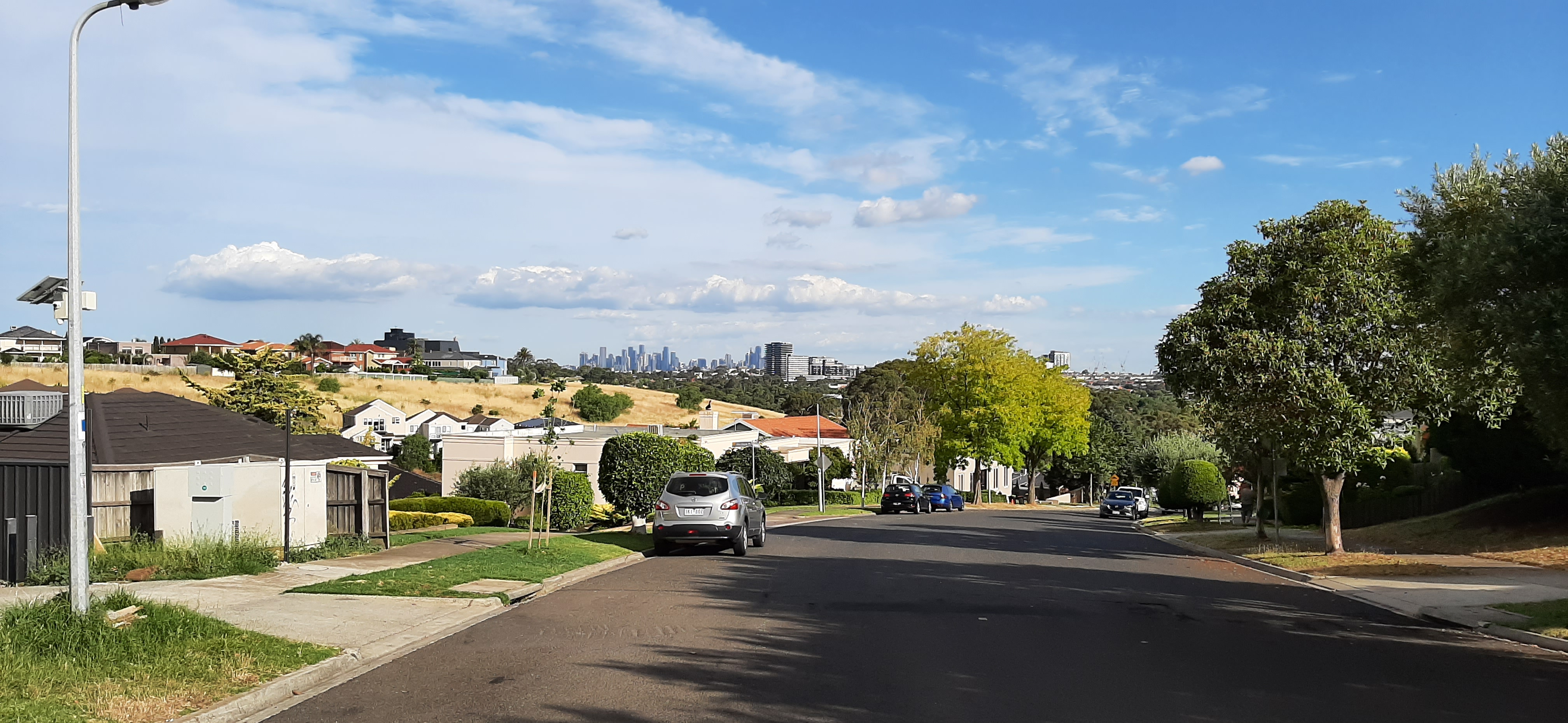
- Residential area near the Maribyrnong River with Melbourne CBD in the distance

- Interactive map of Avondale Heights
- Coordinates: 37.762°S 144.863°E
- Country: Australia
- State: Victoria
- City: Melbourne
- LGA: City of Moonee Valley
- Location: 11 km (6.8 mi) from Melbourne

Government
  - State electorate: Niddrie
  - Federal division: Maribyrnong

Area
  - Total: 5.4 km^{2} (2.1 sq mi)
- Elevation: 45 m (148 ft)

Population
  - Total: 12,388 (2021 census)
  - Density: 2,294/km^{2} (5,940/sq mi)
- Postcode: 3034
Suburbs around Avondale Heights
Keilor East	Keilor East	Essendon West
Sunshine North	Avondale Heights	Maribyrnong
Braybrook	Braybrook	Maidstone, Maribyrnong

Avondale Heights is a suburb in Melbourne, Victoria, Australia, 11 km (6.8 mi) north-west of Melbourne's Central Business District, located within the City of Moonee Valley local government area. Avondale Heights recorded a population of 12,388 at the 2021 census.

Avondale Heights is located on a plateau bounded by a large bend of the Maribyrnong River to the east, south, and west, and to the north by Buckley Street.

The suburb derives its name from the Avondale Estate. Originally known as Maribyrnong West, when the Council undertook to change the name, postal authorities drew attention to the existence of Avondale in Queensland. The suburb was therefore called Avondale Heights to distinguish it from the Queensland town.

Walter Burley Griffin and Marion Mahony Griffin prepared plans for part of the area: Milleara Estate in the north (also known as City View) in the 1920s. One objective of their design was to remake suburbia and society. They did this through creating internal gardens where communities could both physically and socially bind together. They imagined children's playgrounds, social centres, nature reserves and links with an intricate system of pedestrian ways. Interviewed in Melbourne in 1913, Griffin spoke of internal reserves as:

...favourite playgrounds. Here all the children from the different houses can play together, where their mothers can see them, and where they are safe from the motor traffic in the streets.

The streets are designed in a curvilinear way typical of Griffin's design, often following the topography of the land.

There is only one main road – Military Road which runs from Canning Street and Maribyrnong Road, then becoming Milleara Road at the Avondale Heights Police Station. There are about 40 shops at the Canning Street end (including Raglan Street) and 20 at the other end, near the St Martin De Porres Primary School.

== History ==
Prior to European colonisation of Melbourne, the Wurundjeri Aboriginal people of the Kulin nation moved through the area. Evidence has been found of human occupation for at least 18,000 years. On 10 October 1940, James White dug up an ancient human skull (now known as the Keilor Cranium) on the banks of the Maribyrnong River. This skull has been found to be between 8,000 and 15,800 years old.

In 1803 Charles Grimes, the New South Wales Surveyor General, sailed up the Yarra River in the Buffalo and sent a rowing boat to explore the 'Saltwater River', as the Maribyrnong was then called. The rowing boat reached a rocky, shallow area now known as Solomon's Ford, and could go no further.

In 1835 with the initial settlement of Melbourne, Edmund Davis Fergusson and Michael Solomon established a pastoral holding in the Avondale-Sunshine area. On Solomon's sheep station the ford, now at the west end of Canning Street, soon became known as Solomon's Ford. This was the lowest crossing point on the Saltwater (Maribyrnong) River, and was for many years the only overland route from Melbourne to Geelong and further west. The MMBW reconstructed the ford and the riverbanks nearby in the 1980s, adding large basalt boulders to form stepping stones across the river. Today this ford is one of the last remaining fords in the Melbourne metropolitan area.

During World War I the Canning Street bridge was known as Cordite Bridge as it led to the Department of Defence Explosives Factory. A password was necessary to cross the bridge during the war. During World War II a night curfew was imposed on the river and a boom was put into place to hinder access.

Tourists from Melbourne were attracted to the area with the construction of the elaborate and popular Riverview Tea Gardens in 1909. These grew to include sportsgrounds, kiosks, a dance hall and aviaries. Guests stopped here on their pleasure cruises, and the venue reached the height of its popularity in the 1920s-1930s. The Tea Gardens were closed during World War II and fell into disrepair. Nothing of them remains today, but the riverfront area is still used for recreation, having become Tea Gardens Reserve.

During the 1930s the district was subdivided into small dairy and cattle farms, with some poultry farming. Even into the 1960s market gardens and small dairy farms operated in the area. In the late 1960s housing development changed the area into a residential suburb with views of Melbourne city from the plateau. The Avondale Heights Post Office opened on 9 December 1957 as the suburb developed (A Maribyrnong West office had been open between 1943 and 1947).

It was announced in 2008 that Avondale Heights was set to experience its largest urbanisation initiative since the formation of the area as a suburb. This was due to the sale of the old Kangan Batman TAFE site to private investors, to develop medium density housing. On 26 May 2015, Moonee Valley City Council issued a planning permit for 135 new homes.

== Transport ==
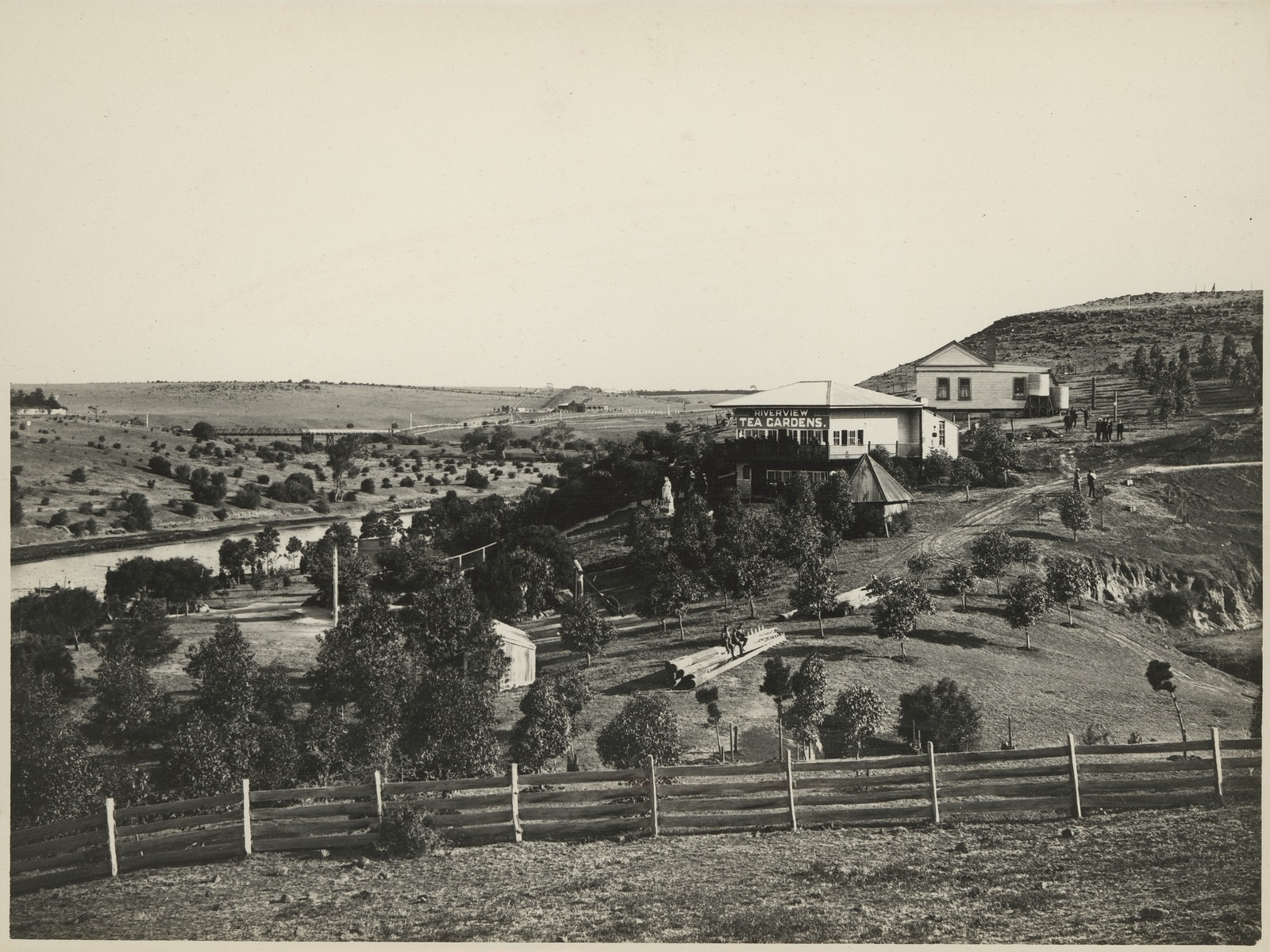
The Riverview Tea Gardens drew visitors to what would become Avondale Heights from 1909-1939

Four bus routes service the suburb:

- 406: Footscray – Keilor East via Victoria University, Highpoint Shopping Centre, Avondale Heights (every day), operated by CDC Melbourne
- 407: Highpoint Shopping Centre – Avondale Heights via Milleara Mall Shopping Centre (Monday to Saturday), operated by CDC Melbourne
- 465: Essendon – Keilor Park via Buckley Street, Milleara Shopping Centre, Keilor East (every day), operated by CDC Melbouurne
- 903 Altona – Mordialloc via Essendon, Northland Shopping Centre, Box Hill, Chadstone Shopping Centre (every day), operated by Kinetic Melbourne

Cyclists and walkers have easy access to the Maribyrnong River Trail along the Maribyrnong River.

There is no tram route through Avondale Heights - the closest is the route 57 tram which ends in Maribyrnong.

== Sport ==
- Avondale Heights has an Australian Rules football team playing in the Essendon District Football League.
- Avondale Heights Soccer Club play in the National Premier League of Victoria
- Avondale Heights Cricket Team
- Avondale Heights Basketball Team named the 'Flying Sparrows' after long time great basketballer Michael Jordan.
- Avondale Raiders Basketball Team, a Junior Basketball Club in the Keilor Basketball Association

== Notable residents ==
- Shane Jacobson, actor, director, writer and comedian
- Matthew Lloyd, Ex AFL footballer, Essendon
- Frederick Valentich, a pilot who disappeared over Bass Strait in 1978
- Borce Ristevski, who was found guilty of the manslaughter of his wife, Karen Ristevski in 2016

== See also ==
- City of Keilor – Avondale Heights was previously within this former local government area.
