= Munitions factory =

Factory that manufactures ammunition and explosives

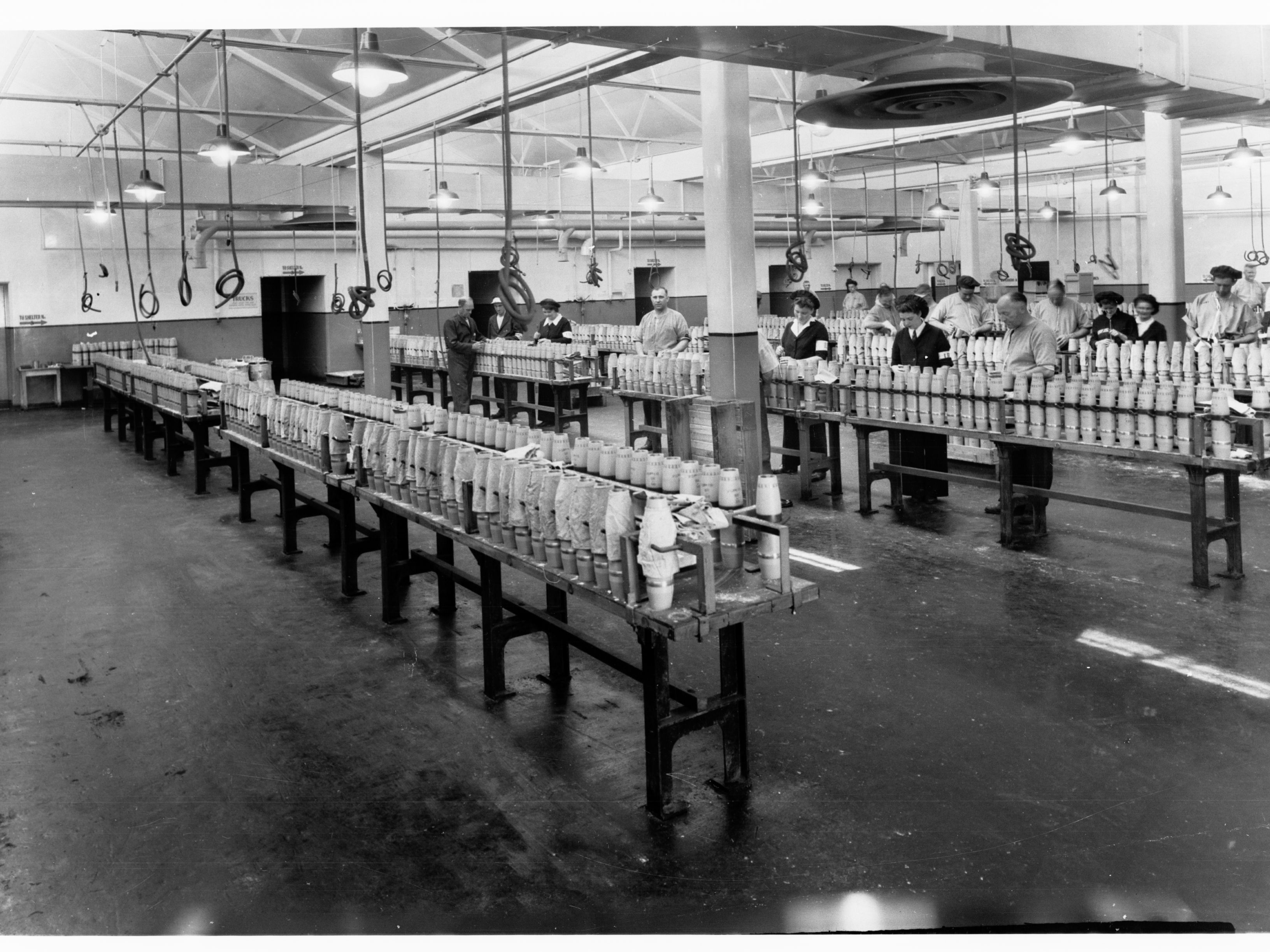
People working in Explosives Factory Salisbury, 1943

A munitions factory, also called an ordnance factory or a munitions manufacturing base, is a factory that produces explosives, ammunition, missiles, and similar products. They are used by the defence industry to produce equipment for military use, as well as for public consumption in countries which allow citizens to carry firearms.

== In the United States ==
In the United States, munitions factories that are used to produce equipment for the military are all government owned, though some are operated by contractors. In 2020, there were 5 active plants. The government office typically responsible for munitions funding is the Department of Defense's Office of the Deputy Assistant Secretary of Defense for Industrial Base Resilience. In September of 2023, that office announced a plan to begin funding more factories, providing $50 million worth in shared equipment and $25 million in monetary funding.

== In the United Kingdom ==
The majority of British military munitions are produced by BAE Systems, a manufacturing company in London, though some are standard NATO equipment manufactured elsewhere. According to a 2020 article from The Guardian, the United Kingdom was the second-largest exporter of arms in the world.

== Hazards ==
Due to the nature of devices being produced in munitions factories, working conditions are typically dangerous. Ordnance can explode, and if the factory is producing chemical or biological weapons, yet more risks are added. Also, concerns have been raised over possible contamination of drinking water due to runoff.

One notable incident with unexploded ordnance going off in the plant was the April 11, 2017 incident at Lake City Army Ammunition Plant, which killed worker Lawrence Bass. The cause is thought to be improper working conditions and untaken precautions. Since 2010, Bass and one other person have died due to exploding parts.

== See also ==
- Filling factories in the United Kingdom
