= Essendon West =

Essendon West Melbourne, Victoria
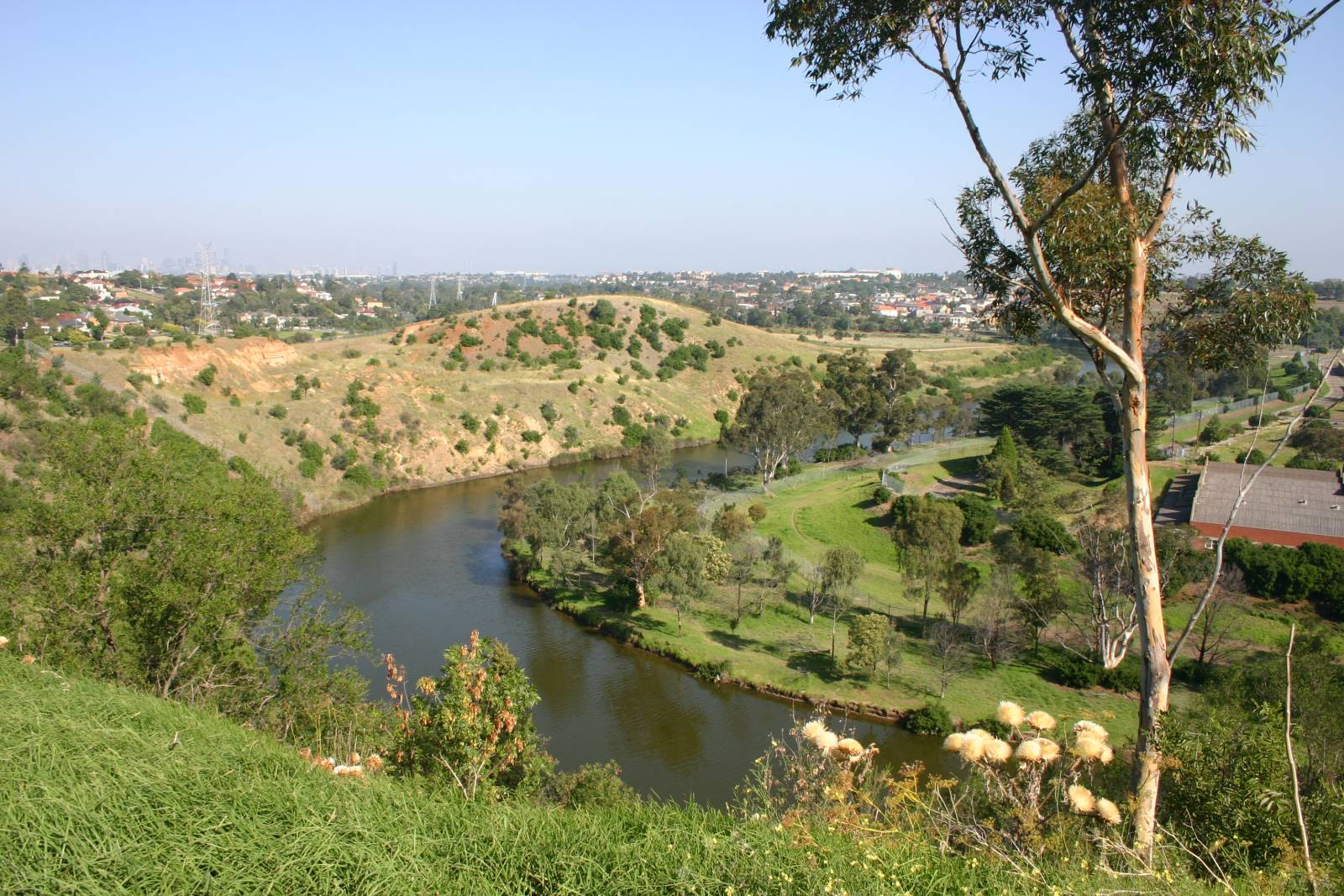
- View of city skyline and Maribyrnong River at Essendon West

- Coordinates: 37.755°S 144.883°E
- Population: 1,559 (2021 census)
  - Density: 1,600/km^{2} (4,000/sq mi)
- Postcode(s): 3040
- Elevation: 35 m (115 ft)
- Area: 1 km^{2} (0.4 sq mi)
- Location: 10 km (6 mi) from Melbourne
- LGA(s): City of Moonee Valley
- State electorate(s): Niddrie
- Federal division(s): Maribyrnong
Suburbs around Essendon West:
Keilor East	Niddrie	Essendon
Keilor East	Essendon West	Essendon
Avondale Heights	Maribyrnong	Aberfeldie

Essendon West is a suburb in Melbourne, Victoria, Australia, 10 km (6.2 mi) north-west of Melbourne's Central Business District, located within the City of Moonee Valley local government area. Essendon West recorded a population of 1,559 at the 2021 census.

Essendon West is bounded in the west by the Steele Creek, in the north by Rosehill Road, in the east by Afton Street and Hoffmans Road, and in the south by the Maribyrnong River.

Essendon West is primarily residential with a range of housing ranging from interwar Californian Bungalows to post war dwellings and modern homes.

== History ==
Essendon West Post Office opened on 1 July 1924.

From the 1850s to the early 20th century, sand was mined from the tall, cliff-like banks of the Maribyrnong River. The Maribyrnong Sand Company was set up in the early 20th century to transport the sand by barge downriver to Footscray and Yarraville, for use in the production of glass, concrete and ceramics. This area is currently within the bounds of the Afton Street Conservation Reserve where the remains can still be seen.

== Community ==
Essendon West is represented by an Australian Rules football team, Doutta Stars, playing in the Essendon District Football League. Its home ground lies in neighbouring Essendon. St Bernard's College is located in Essendon West.

== See also ==
- City of Keilor – Essendon West was previously within this former local government area.
- Defence Explosive Factory Maribyrnong – just across the river, the riverside streets have excellent views of this site.
