= Afton Street Conservation Reserve =

Public parklands in Melbourne, Australia

Coordinates: 37°45′26.50″S 144°52′59.76″E

The Afton Street Conservation Reserve is situated along the middle reaches of the Maribyrnong River in Essendon West, Melbourne. It lies within the City of Moonee Valley and is 17 hectares (42 acres) in area.

== History ==
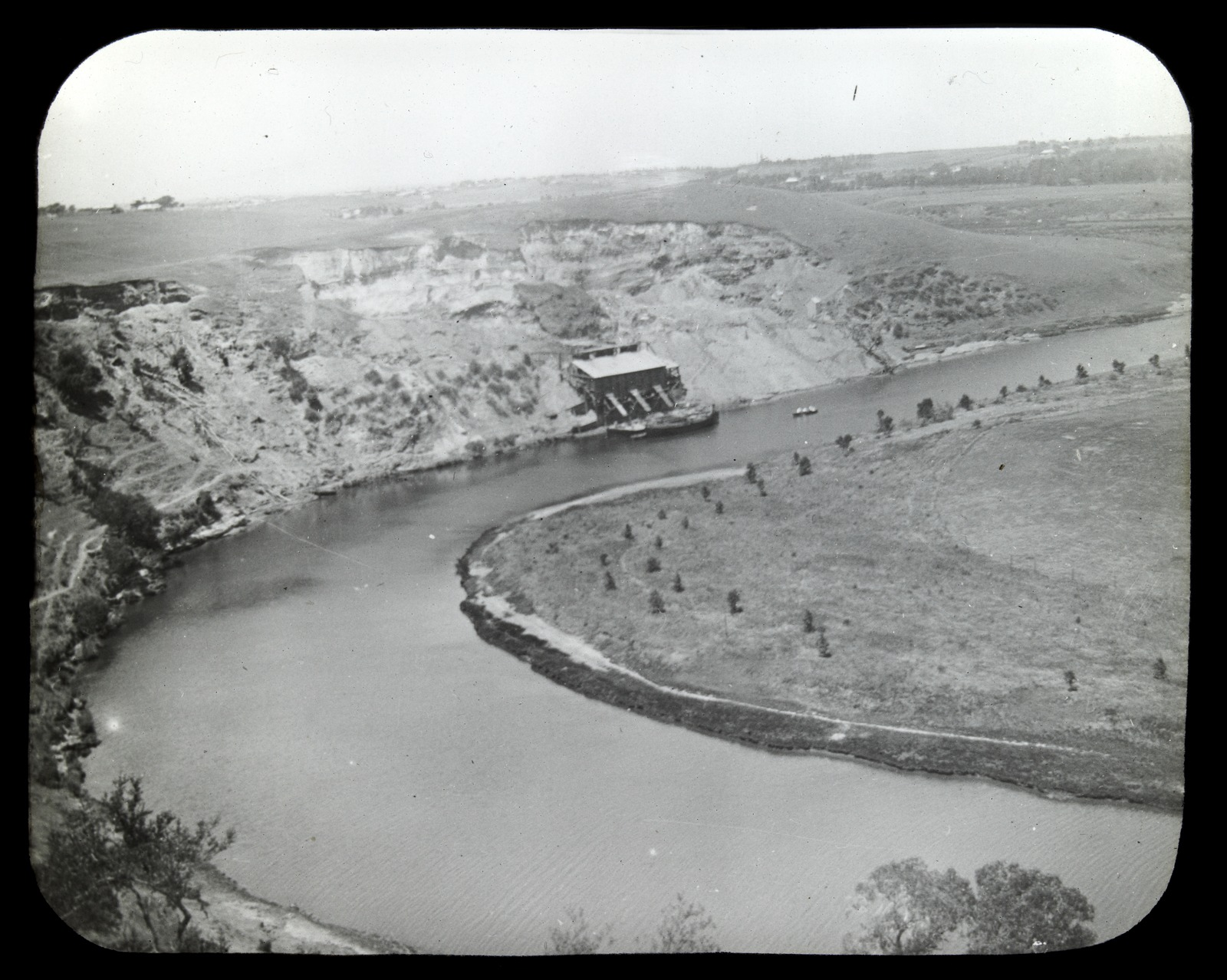
Sand mining in what is now the Afton Street Conservation Reserve, circa 1910

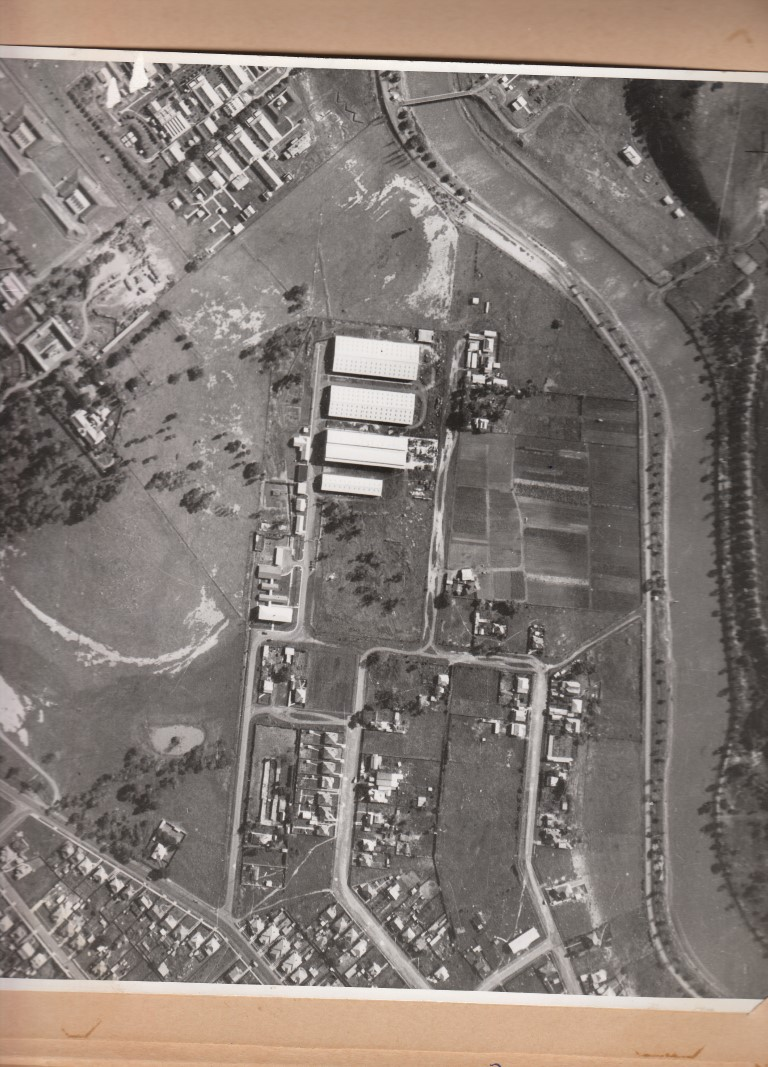
The military bridge can be seen in this aerial photograph from 1953

This area was a significant site for the Wurundjeri indigenous people, who used the basalt silcrete outcrops of this area to make stone tools. The area was also rich in food and other resources. In the mid-1800s this area was owned by pastoralist John Aitkin. In the late-1800s and early-1900s, the northern end of the site was quarried for sand, which significantly changed the topography of this area in ways that are still visible today. The Maribyrnong Sand Company was set up in the early 20th century to transport the sand by barge downriver to the then-industrial suburbs of Footscray and Yarraville, for use in the production of glass, concrete and ceramics.

In the 20th century, the site was part of the Defence Explosive Factory Maribyrnong. Because the rest of the defence site was on the other side of the river, a bridge was built to connect the area to the main part of the site. This "military bridge" no longer exists but part of its abutment can still be seen in the conservation reserve. The bridge was used to transport munitions to the site for their storage, testing and disposal. The topography of the site was further altered by the construction of the North West Sewer later in the 20th century; spoil from which was spread over the southern part of the reserve.

Caves in the northern part of the reserve that had been filled in with earth were observed by researchers in 2005. Anecdotally, these caves were used for munitions testing. The possible future excavation of these caves, together with sub-surface testing of other areas of the reserve, has been recommended to further investigate the indigenous occupation of this area.

The conservation park was purchased by the Moonee Valley City Council in October 2003 for AU$900,000.

== Planning ==
A master landscape plan was issued for the site and won a number of design awards. The plan emphasises conservation and recreational use of the park.

== Flora and fauna ==
- Two areas of Western Basalt Plains Grassland
- 25 regionally-significant species of indigenous plants
- potential habitat and occurrence of the nationally significant Striped Legless Lizard
- areas of valuable native fauna habitat including five ‘birds of prey’ using open grassland areas, small passerine birds including thornbills and silvereyes using the shrub layer and waterbirds using the riparian fringe

== Gallery ==
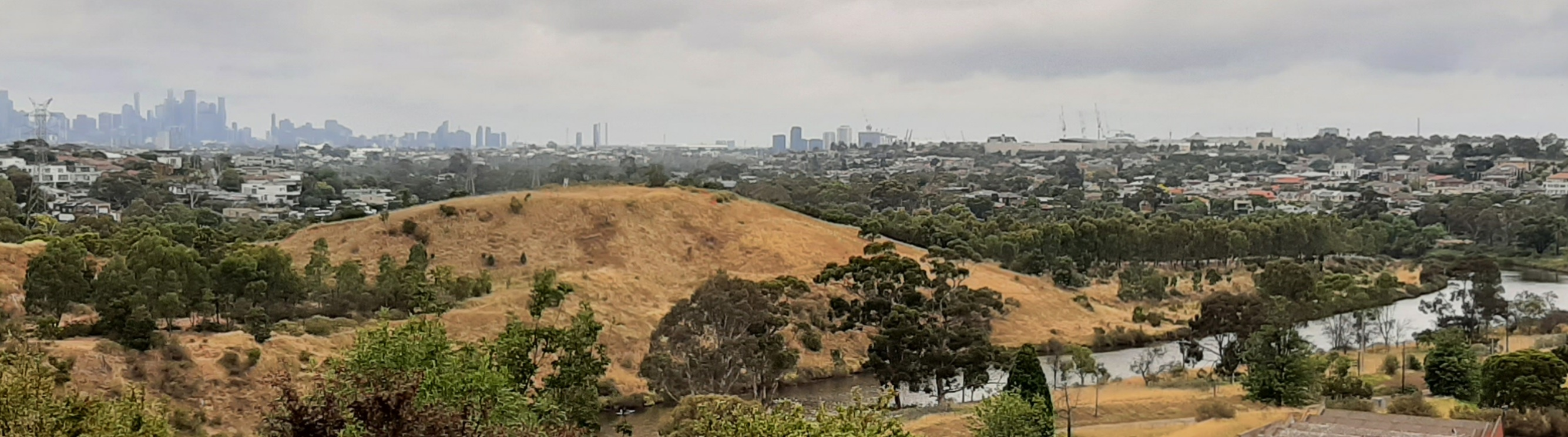
The reserve (raised land) as seen from Prospect St, West Essendon

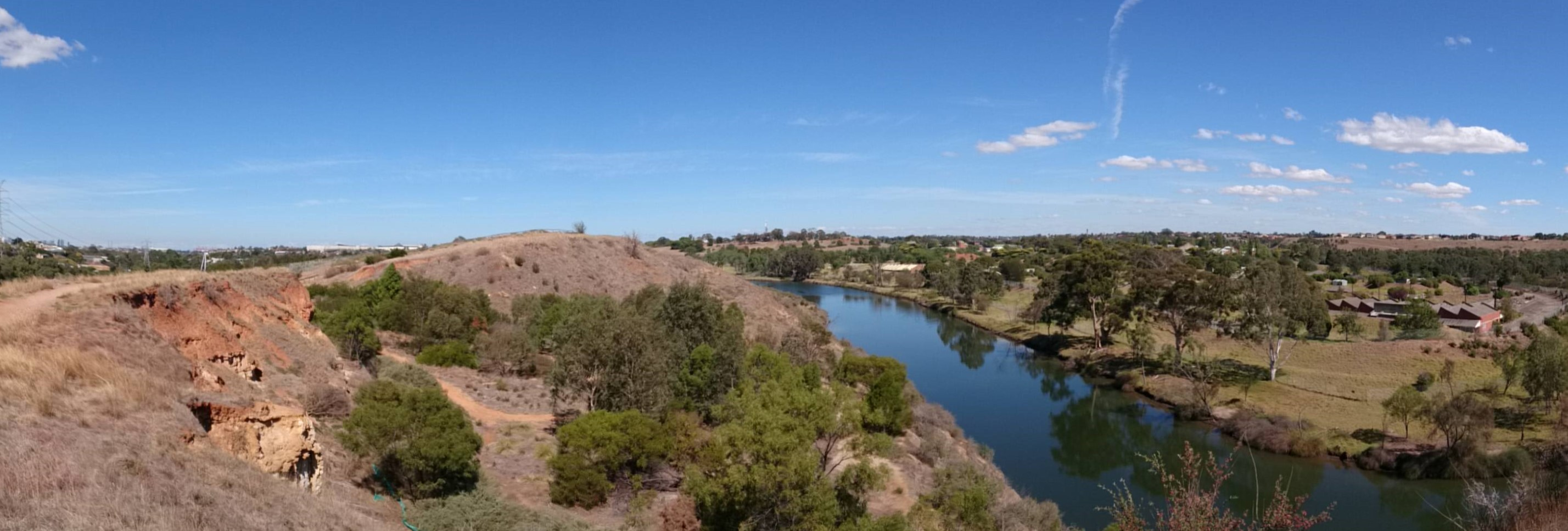
The reserve showing remains of caves (left) and the defunct Defence Explosive Factory Maribyrnong across the river
