= Highpoint Shopping Centre =

Coordinates: 37°46′24″S 144°53′09″E

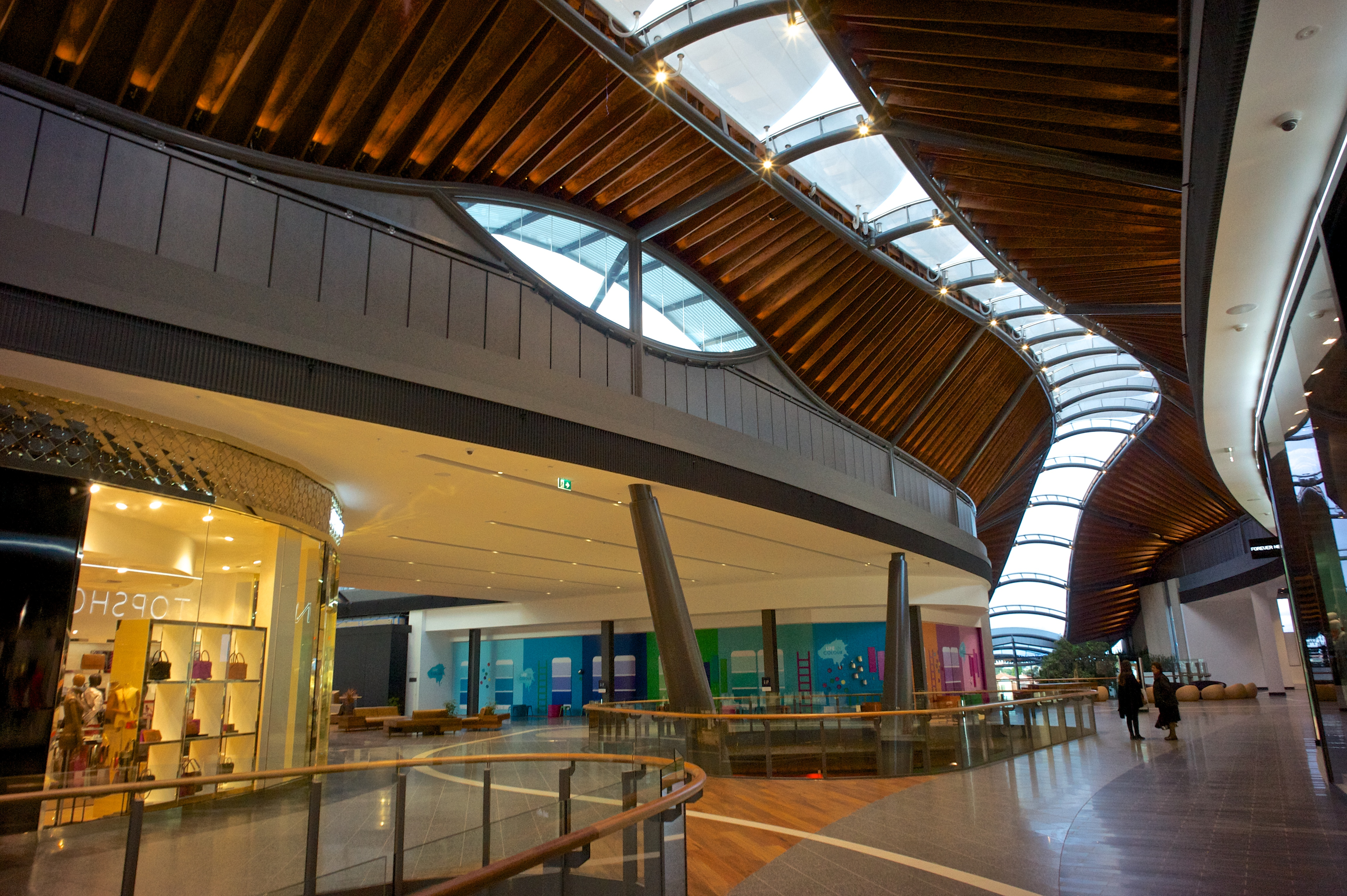
- Interior view of section added during redevelopment in 2013
- Location: Maribyrnong, Victoria, Australia
- Opened: 2 September 1975; 51 years ago
- Developer: GPT Group
- Manager: GPT Group
- Owner: GPT Group
- Num. of stores: 500
- Num. of anchor tenants: 7
- Floor area: 156,000 m^{2} (1,680,000 sq ft)
- Floors: 4
- Parking: over 6,200
- Website: www.highpoint.com.au

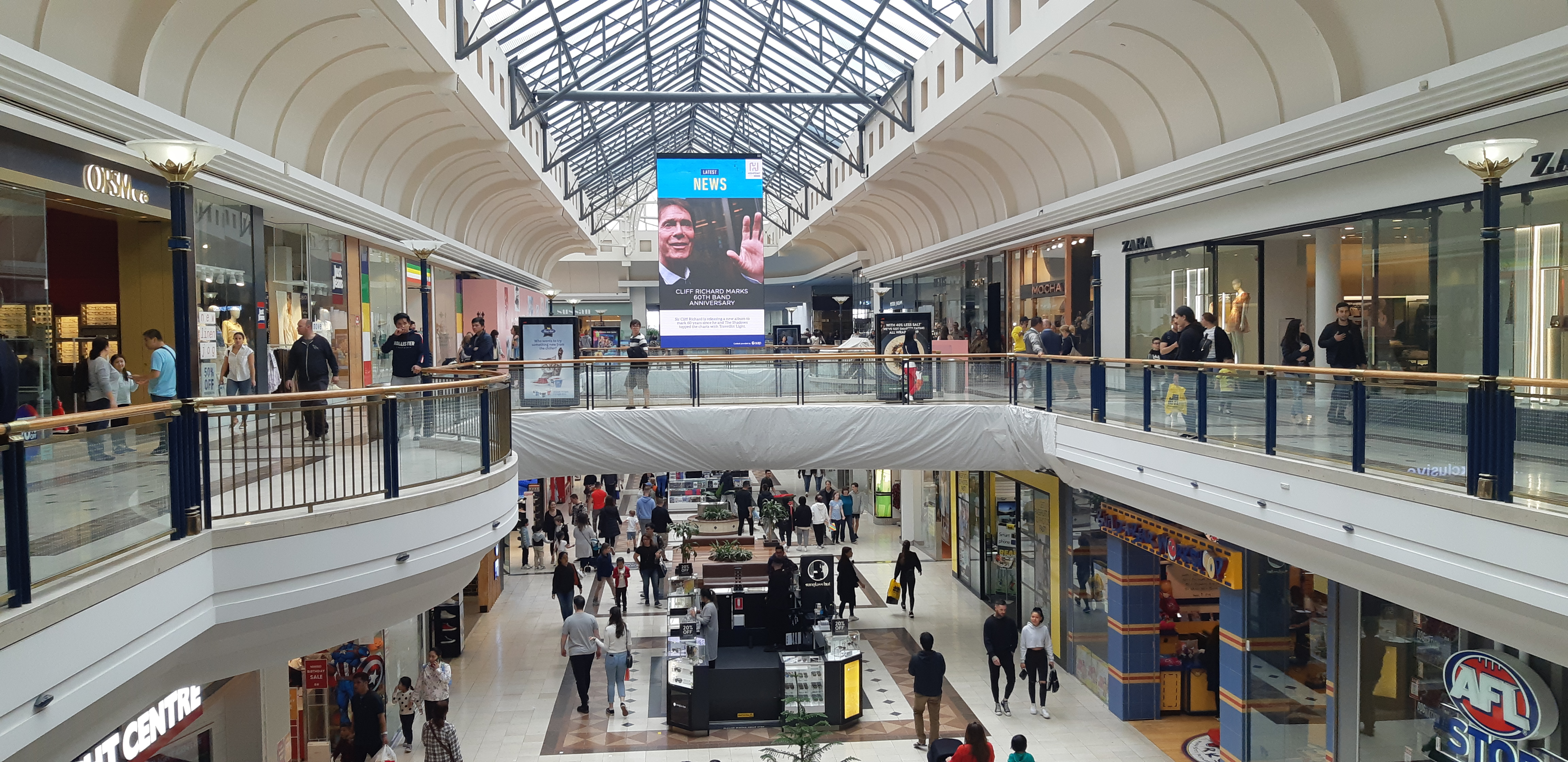
Interior of Highpoint Shopping Centre

Highpoint Shopping Centre is a shopping centre located in Maribyrnong, in the western suburbs of Melbourne, Victoria, Australia.

Highpoint is Victoria's third largest shopping centre and the fifth largest in Australia, with an annual turnover of $778 million and over 15 million shoppers visiting each year. It is the largest shopping centre serving Melbourne's western and north western suburbs, an area with a population of at least half a million people.

== History ==
Highpoint is built on a hill which looks out over the Maribyrnong River to the Melbourne central business district, hence its name. An anti-aircraft battery operated on the site during World War II for protection of the surrounding military bases and ammunition works in Maidstone and Maribyrnong.

The 50-acre site was previously a quarry, as can be seen by the quarry cliff face walls of the lower carparks. The land was sold by the City of Essendon for $1.85 million in April 1971, with permission required also from the City of Sunshine as the quarry was also located in that local government area.

Highpoint West opened in September 1975. Built by Development Underwriting for $12 million.

Named originally Westland to fit in with other shopping centres, Northland, etc., it opened as Highpoint West. It was later renamed Highpoint City, and then just Highpoint.

=== Redevelopment ===
==== 2011 - 2013 ====
The most recent rounds of expansion and redevelopment occurred in two stages, commencing in March 2011. An additional 30,000 m^{2} was added including the first David Jones department store in Melbourne's western suburbs. Expansions, over two levels, incorporated traffic flow improvements, an additional 1,000 car spaces and 100 extra speciality retailers. The first stage of the redevelopment opened 18 October 2012 included a new Woolworths as well as a Fresh Food Market, and an improved car park with "Park Assist" technology. The second stage opened on 14 March 2013 including the David Jones store over two levels, an Apple Store, Australia's second Samsung Experience store, a Topshop clothing store (now closed and replaced by Uniqlo) and a Zara clothing store along with 98 specialty stores and an extra 1,000 car spaces. One of the redevelopments aims was to improve the centre's sustainability.

==== Highpoint Urban Village plan ====
In 2021, GPT approved the Highpoint Urban Village plan, a development plan for an urban village composed of a mixture of residential and commercial uses, community facilities, green open spaces and provision for additional retail. The 30-year plan includes proposals for a new 2,800-square-metre (30,000 sq ft) library and community hub, new green space including a new town plaza, around 3,000 new dwellings, bus interchange upgrades and the construction of commercial and retail spaces.

In November 2026, David Jones included their store in the centre on a list of 19 stores they plan to close by the end of 2026 as a result of their administration.

== Ownership ==
Until 2006, Highpoint was owned by Melbourne's Besen family, owners of the Sussan retail chain. In March 2006, the GPT Group purchased a 50% stake and management rights for $621 million. In September 2017, GPT bought the remaining 50% of Highpoint for $680 million. The Highpoint complex was independently valued at $2.3 billion in late 2016.
