= Proposed Melbourne tram extensions =

Proposals for improvements to the Melbourne tram network

Numerous proposals have been made for improvements to the Melbourne tram network, the largest such network in the world. Nearly all of these have been for track extensions of existing lines to connect with nearby railway station or to service new areas and suburbs.

== Recent proposals ==
=== Caulfield to Chadstone, Monash and Rowville route ===
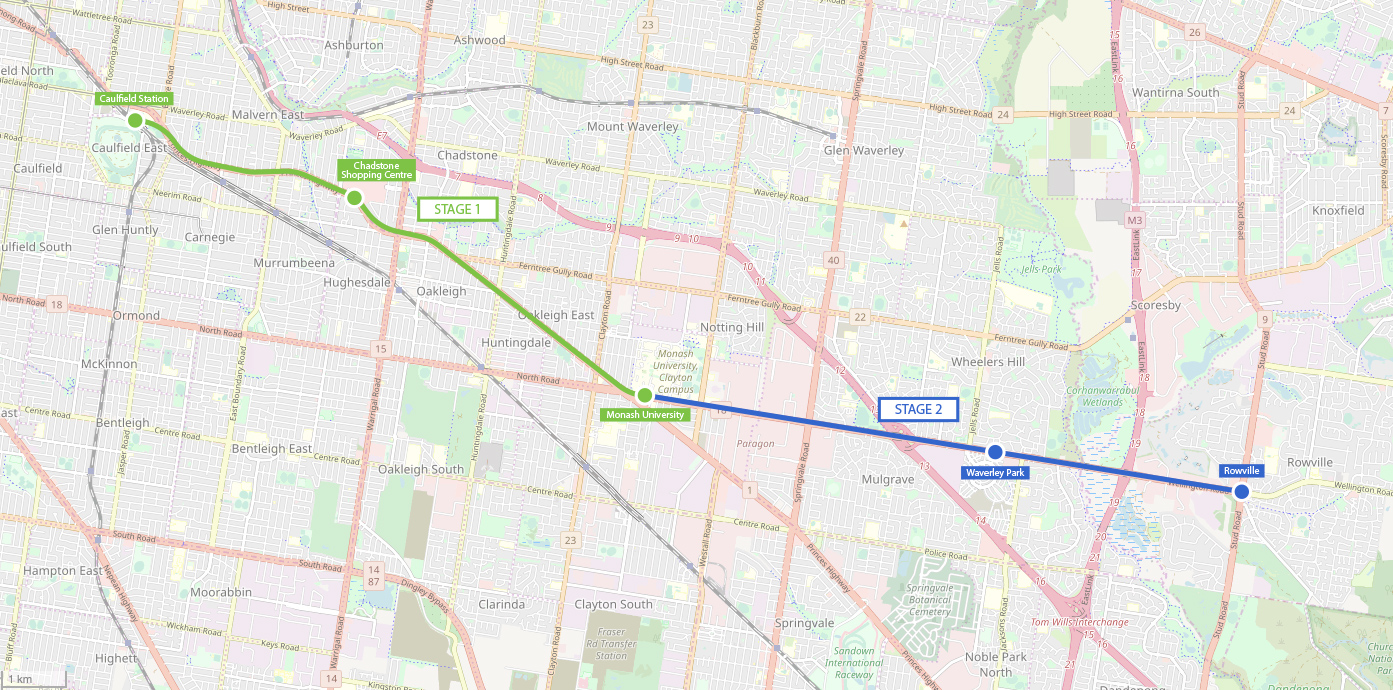
Map showing the 2018 State Government proposal for a new light rail line from Caulfield railway station to Chadstone, Monash University, Waverley Park and Rowville. The two stages are shown in green and blue, stations locations are not finalised.

In April 2018, the State Government of Victoria announced an extension of the tram network from Caulfield. The 18 km (11.1 mi) extension would run from Caulfield station to Chadstone, Monash University, Waverley Park and Rowville. The state government allocated $3 million to plan the route, which would be constructed in two stages, with the first running from Caulfield to Monash. This proposal is a light rail alternative to the long-proposed Rowville railway line project. In the 2018-2019 Federal Budget, the Australian Government committed $475 million to a heavy rail line from Caulfield to Monash University that would run on the same corridor as the light rail proposal.

In 2019, nearby local councils expressed concern that the project had been shelved. In 2021, Monash University began lobbying the state and federal governments for an alternative rapid bus plan, using experimental "trackless tram" technology. In November 2021, the Minister for Transport Infrastructure told state parliament that the government was examining a rapid bus alternative and was working with the federal government to develop a business case.

=== Tram routes to Fishermans Bend ===
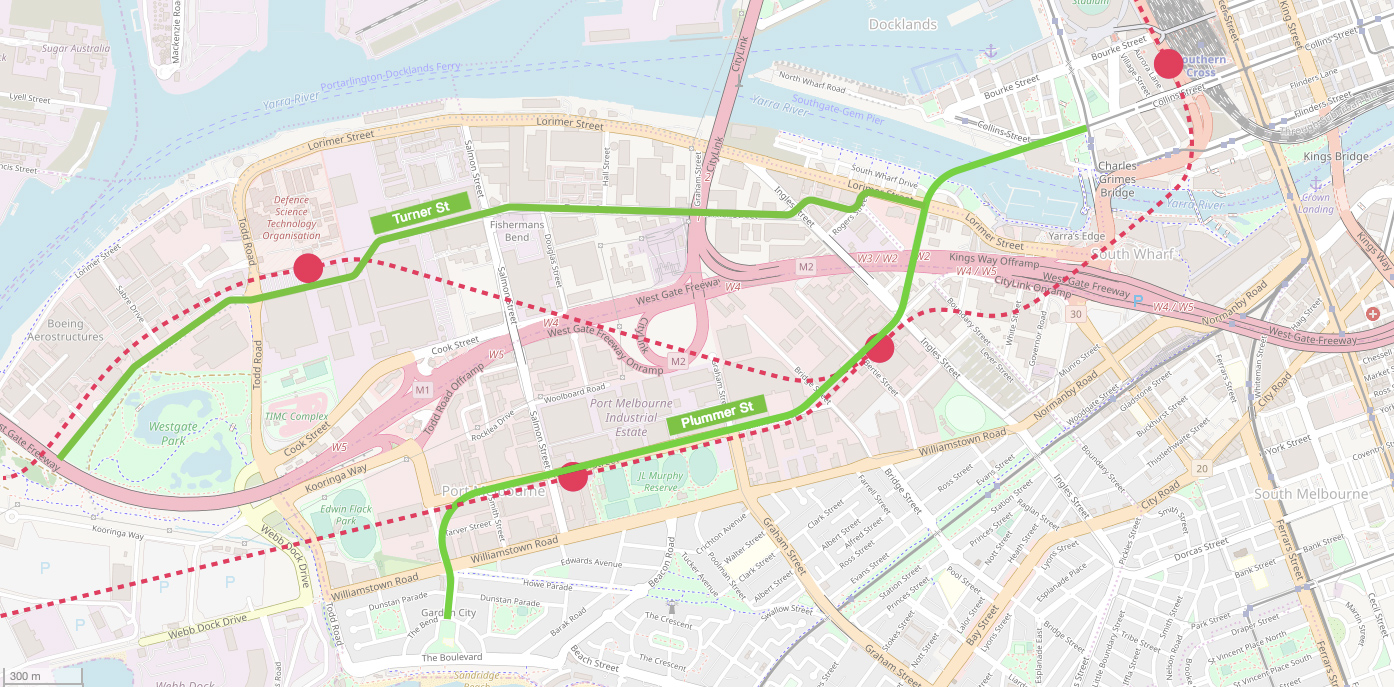
Map showing the two proposed extensions of the tram network through Fishermans Bend, according to the State Government's 2018 framework plan.

State and local governments have also proposed the extension of route 48 from its current terminus at Victoria Harbour in Docklands across the Yarra River and into the Fishermans Bend precinct, a future major urban renewal area. It would require the construction of a new tram-only bridge and generally follow the path of Fennell and Plummer Streets. The tram extension is proposed as an interim solution to connect Fishermans Bend residents to the CBD via mass transit until the metropolitan railway network can be extended with new underground stations. The proposed bridge has faced some opposition from local groups and residents, whom fear it will destroy a local park and prevent tall boats from mooring at a nearby marina and travelling upstream. The bridge has been costed by the State Government at over $200 million.

The State Government released a Framework for Fishermans Bend in October 2018 that proposed two new tram routes through the area: one running through the new suburbs of Sandridge and Wirraway along Plummer Street, and the other running through Lorimer and the Employment Precinct along Turner Street. The Framework gives a 'medium term' delivery timeframe of 2020–2025, while Infrastructure Australia also identified the project as a 'medium term' priority. The 2019-2020 state budget allocated $4.5 million to plan the tram routes to Fishermans Bend and develop a preliminary business case for the project.

== Other proposals ==
=== Route 3 to Hughesdale ===
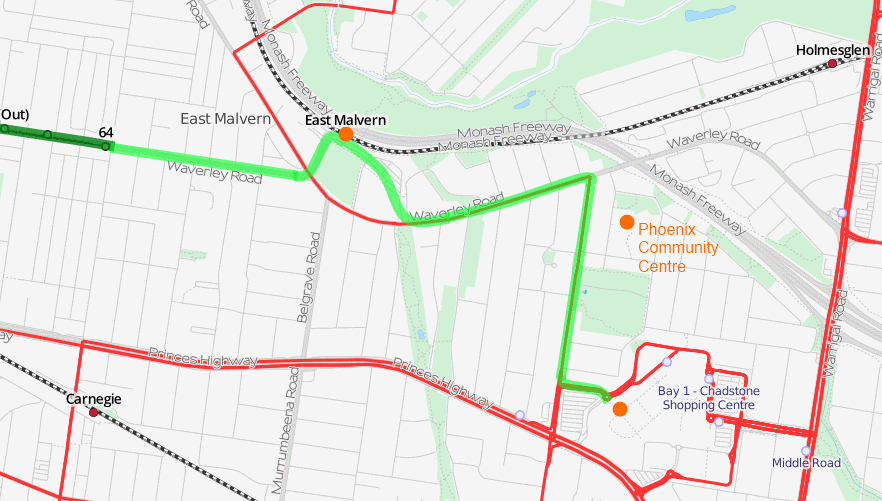
Map of an earlier proposed route 3 extension.

In 2005, the Public Transport Users Association (PTUA) proposed for an extension of route 3 from East Malvern. It would run from its current terminus to East Malvern railway station, before continuing until it reaches Chadstone Shopping Centre. It would provide Chadstone with some form of rail link, also connecting it directly to a railway station.

Later planning documents, including Infrastructure Victoria’s 2025 30‑Year Strategy, identified an East Malvern–Chadstone–Hughesdale tram extension as a priority corridor, noting Chadstone’s lack of a fixed‑rail connection and the benefits of linking it to Hughesdale railway station.

=== Route 3 to Kensington ===
In 2025, Infrastructure Victoria proposed an extension of route 3 from Hughesdale to Kensington railway station via Arden railway station.

=== Route 5 to Darling station ===
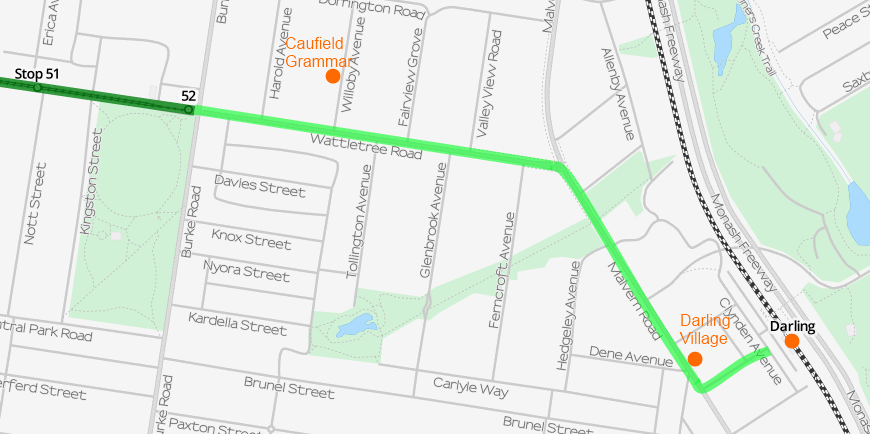
Map of a proposed route 5 extension.

The extension from Malvern of route 5 has been proposed by the PTUA and the Rail Futures Institute. It would run from its current terminus to Darling railway station and Darling Village.

=== Route 5 to Flemington Bridge ===
In 2025 Infrastructure Victoria proposed an extension of route 5 to Flemington Bridge railway station. It would involve the route to turn left after Anzac railway station down Park Street with a short extension of track, connect with Clarendon St, and follow Spencer Street, with a stop at Southern Cross railway station. The tram would then continue via Arden railway station and terminate at Flemington Bridge railway station.

=== Route 6 to Ashburton ===
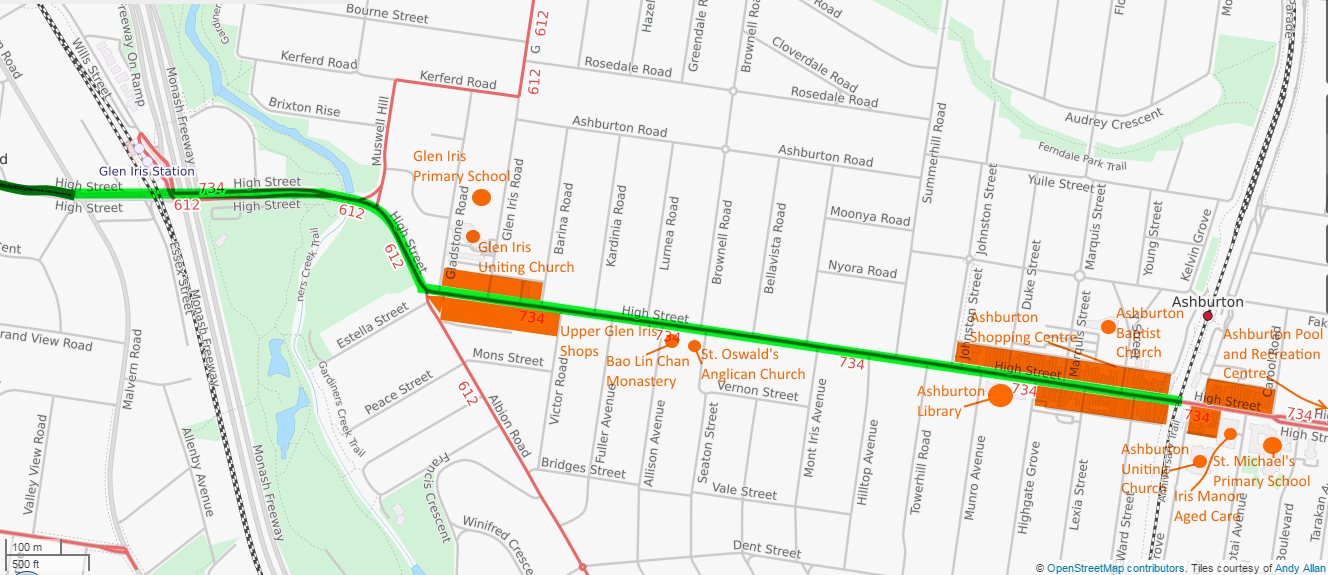
Map of a proposed route 6 extension.

In response to the State Government's 2001 Melbourne 2030 planning policy, the PTUA lobbied to extend tram route 6 from its current terminus at Glen Iris railway station to Ashburton railway station. It would require an extra 2.2 km of track extending over the Monash Freeway, continuing along High Street until reaching the level crossing.

=== Route 11 to Reservoir ===
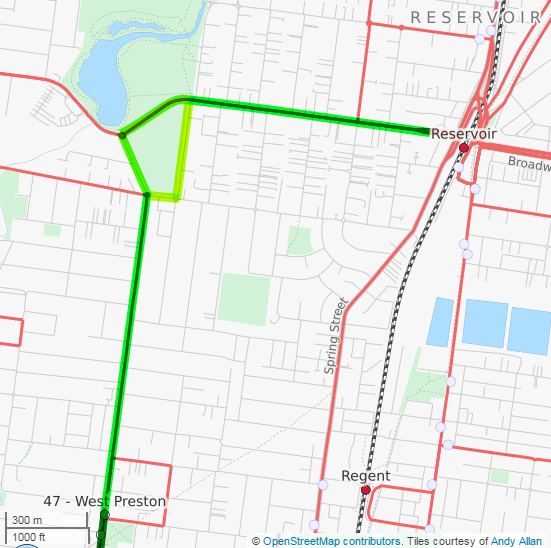
Map of a proposed route 11 extension, showing two alternative routes.

The City of Darebin has argued for the extension of route 11 to the Reservoir activity centre. The most likely route would be to continue north along Gilbert Road reaching Edwardes Lake, before turning right into Edwardes Street and continuing east to a new terminus near Reservoir railway station in the commercial area. The extension would cover a distance of just over 3 km.

An alternative, which appeared in Darebin's 2010 proposal, has the tram heading north on Gilbert Rd, east on Henty St, north on Spratling St, then east on Edwardes St to the terminus. This route avoids the steep grade around Edwardes Lake.

The cost was estimated to be $30 million, with $50,000 required for a feasibility study. In February 2018, the federal Opposition Leader Bill Shorten pledged $40 million to extend Route 11 to the end of Gilbert Road if the Labor party won government. This announcement was criticised by some for failing short of funding the full route to Reservoir station.

=== Route 11 to Fishermans Bend ===
In 2025, Infrastructure Victoria proposed an extension of route 11 from Victoria Harbour Docklands to a southern area of Fishermans Bend.

=== Route 16 to Kew Junction ===
The PTUA proposed extending the route of route 16 with the tram continuing left at the corner of Cotham and Glenferrie Roads, following the current route 109 for 800m to the west before terminating at the Kew Junction. This would allow interchange with Route 48 trams and the 200 and 207 buses via Johnston Street. Little infrastructure would be required, as the tracks are already in place.

=== Route 19 to Gowrie ===
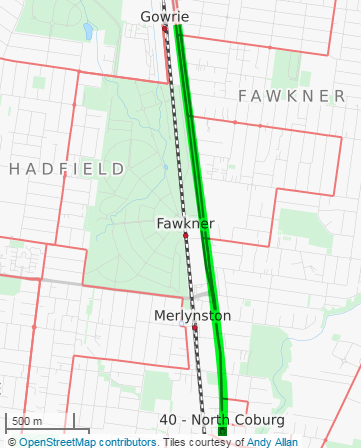
Map of a proposed route 19 extension.

In the lead up to the 2014 State election, the Greens proposed extending route 19 from its current terminus at Bakers Road, North Coburg for a length of 3.7 km passing Merlynston railway station, Fawkner railway station and ending with a new terminus outside Gowrie railway station. In 2018, the Rail Futures Institute called for a similar extension to Merlynston station.

=== Route 48 to Doncaster ===
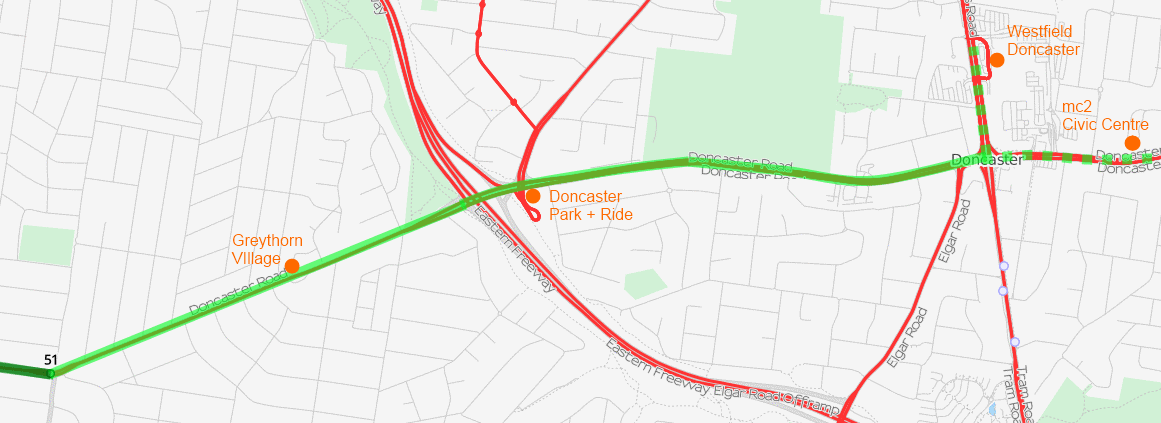
Map of the proposed route 48 extension, including two potential termini.

The PTUA, City of Boroondara, City of Manningham and City of Yarra have advocated for an extension of route 48 to Doncaster as a cheaper and more efficient alternative to the proposed Doncaster railway line. The 4-kilometre extension would be a continuation of the route along Doncaster Road past Greythorn Village, Doncaster Park and Ride with a terminus at Westfield Doncaster or possibly the mc2 community facility in Doncaster Hill.

The extension was first proposed in the mid-1940s, soon after the tram route was extended to its present-day terminus at Balwyn Road. The then-City of Camberwell made the proposal formally to the Tramways Board in 1945, but the project was not pursued.

In 2006, the Liberal opposition under Ted Baillieu promised the extension by 1 July 2010 if he was to win office in the next election, pricing it at $35 million. It was stated that there would have been about two accessible stops every kilometre, similar to the recent Box Hill tram extension. The Labor Government held onto power, and the extension was not built, even when the Liberals later won office in 2010.

A study commissioned by Manningham Council in 2010 argued that the steep gradient on Doncaster Road would preclude current rolling stock from operating safely on Doncaster Road. The report also suggested that extra trams would need to be purchased to address the issue. The report was never released, but the PTUA and other groups criticised its public findings, contending that steeper gradients are present across the existing network, such as Burke Road in Camberwell and along the Burwood Highway. The Labor state government in 2016 said it would not fund the extension.

During the 2022 election campaign, the Liberal opposition under Matthew Guy committed to the extension, estimating the cost to be $102 million.

=== Route 57 to East Keilor ===
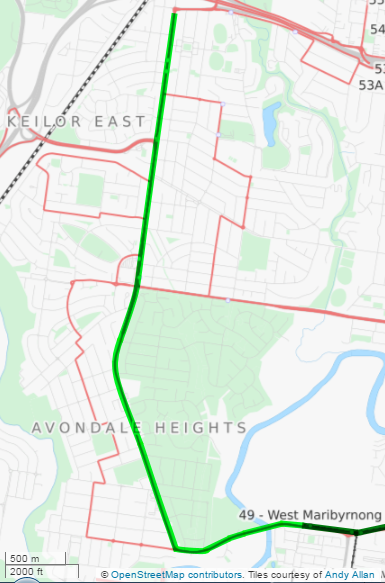
Map of a proposed route 57 extension.

In the lead up to the 2014 state election, the Greens proposed extending route 57 for 5.5 km from its current terminus in Maribyrnong along Canning Street and Milleara Road before reaching a new terminus at the Keilor East shopping precinct. In 2018, the Rail Futures Institute called for a similar extension of the route to Lower Avondale Heights.

=== Route 58 to Hartwell ===
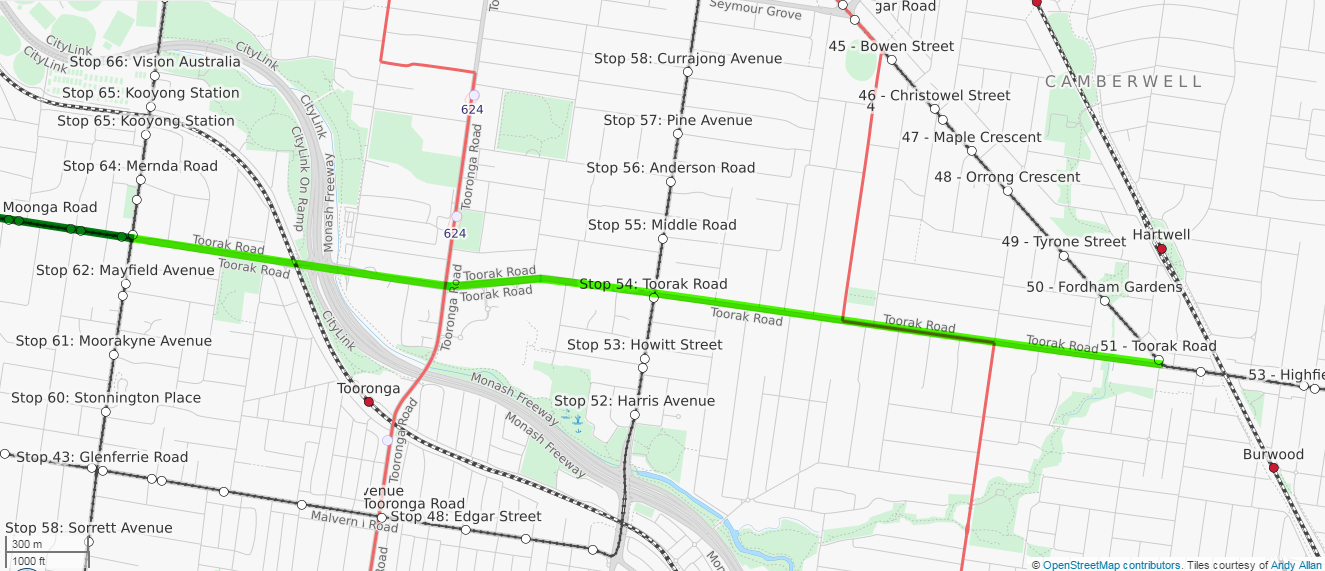
Map of a proposed route 58 extension.

The PTUA has proposed a continuation of route 58 from its current terminus east down Toorak Road, terminating near to where it would join the current route 75 and the Alamein railway line at Hartwell railway station. It would cover just over 4 km.

=== Route 58 to Coburg North ===
In 2025, Infrastructure Victoria proposed an extension of route 58 from Melville Road in Pascoe Vale South to Batman railway station in Coburg North.

=== Route 59 to Melbourne Airport ===
In 2018, the Rail Futures Institute proposed an extension of route 59 to Melbourne Airport in Tullamarine alongside a rapid airport rail link, primarily as a commuting service for airport workers.

=== Route 67 to Carnegie ===
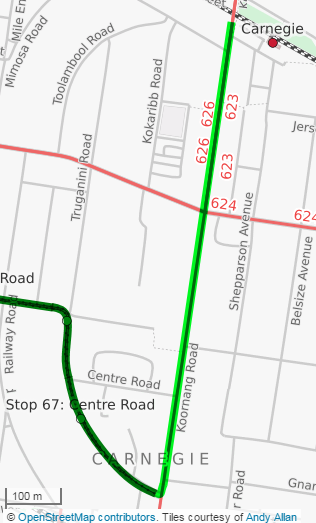
Map of a proposed route 67 extension.

The PTUA and the Rail Futures Institute have both proposed a continuation of route 67 from its current terminus north up Koornang Road, terminating at Carnegie railway station and passing through Carnegie shopping strip. It would cover just 900 metres and become a modal interchange.

=== Route 75 to Ferntree Gully ===
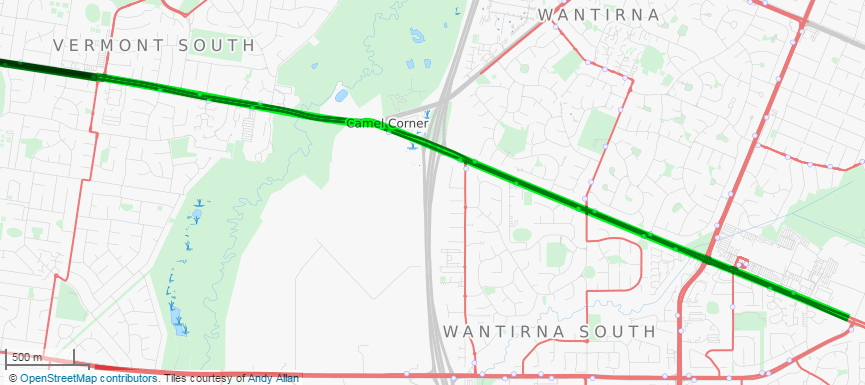
Map of a proposed route 75 extension to Knox City Council Precinct.

In the lead up to the 2014 state election, the Greens proposed extending route 75 from its current terminus outside Vermont South Shopping Centre for a length of 6.8 km down Burwood Highway passing Westfield Knox City Shopping Centre and ending near a Knox City Council precinct. The Eastern Transport Coalition, an advocacy group representing seven local councils in Melbourne's East, has called for this extension.

During the 2022 state election, the Liberal opposition party promised $134 million to extend the route 5.1 km to Westfield Knox, although the party said the line could be delivered as a rapid bus line instead of a tram. The party promised a study to investigate higher-capacity public transport to Upper Ferntree Gully, and along Mountain Highway to Bayswater.

=== Route 75 to Footscray ===
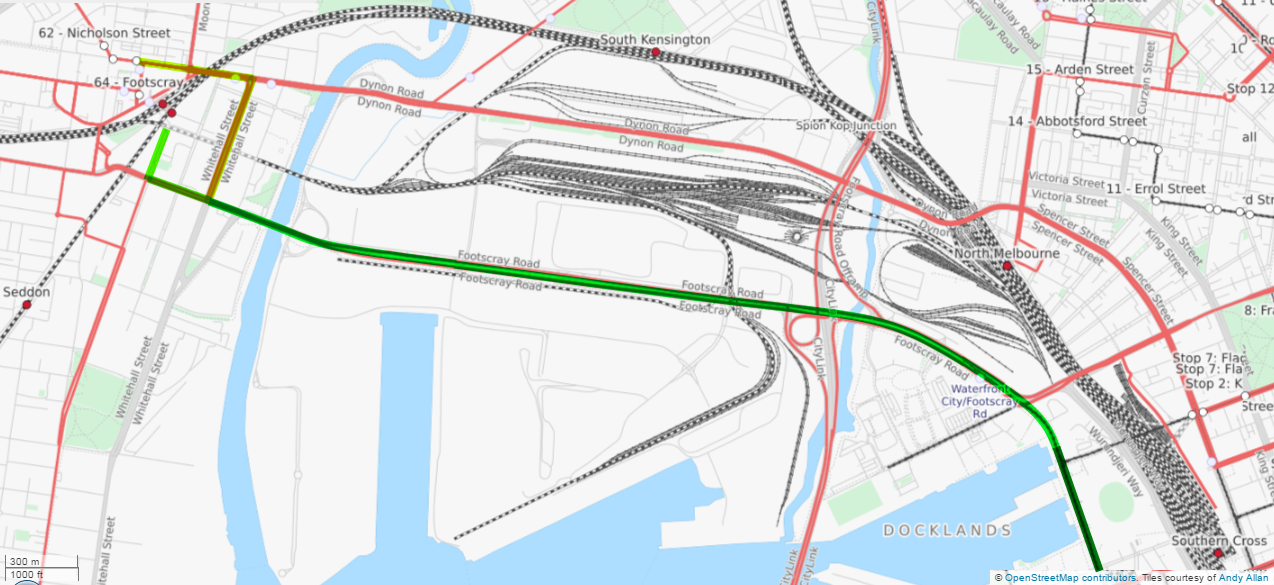
Map of a proposed route 75 to Footscray extension, including two potential termini.

Melbourne and Maribyrnong City Councils have advocated for a new tram link between the CBD and Footscray. The commonly cited route would be to extend route 75 tram tracks from their current terminus near Harbour Town in Docklands along the median of Footscray Road, acting as a light rail with minimal stops, before crossing the Maribyrnong River into Napier Street. From here, it is possible the tram could terminate at Footscray railway station by turning right at Hyde Street, or following Whitehall and Hopkins Streets to rejoin route 82 as one long route.

=== Route 86 to South Morang ===
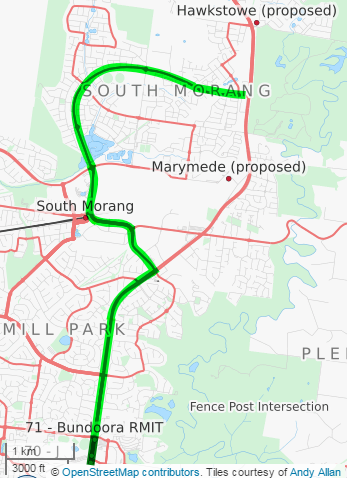
Map of a proposed route 86 extension.

The City of Whittlesea's 2016 Future Transport Plan called for an extension to the route 86 tram as a 'very high' priority. The council proposed an extension of the route from its current terminus at University Hill near Bundoora's RMIT Campus to the Plenty Valley Town Centre in South Morang. This proposal included a stop at South Morang station. Other local plans have included going to Hawkstowe station and even as far as Doreen via Mernda.

=== New North Richmond to North Melbourne route ===
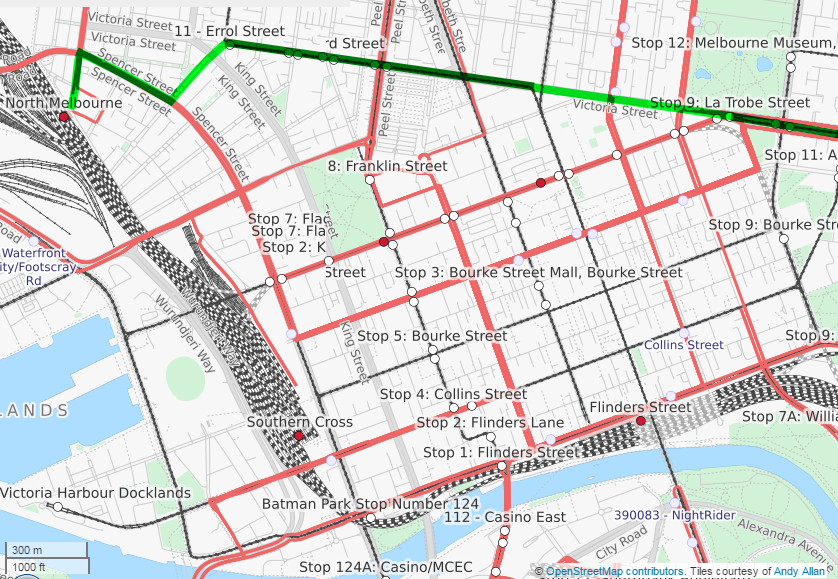
Map of the western and central sections of the proposed East–West Light Rail (in green)

Leading up to the 2013 Australian federal election, a 5 km east–west tram route on Victoria Street/Victoria Parade dubbed the East–West Light Rail was proposed by the Australian Greens. This proposed link would run along the entire northern perimeter of the Melbourne CBD and connect North Richmond and North Melbourne train stations.

Only two major sections of track would need to be built as 84% of the track between North Richmond station and Errol Street, North Melbourne already exists. These two sections would be an 800 m (0.5 mi) section to connect the tram tracks already existing on Victoria Street from its intersection with Spring Street to its intersection with Swanston Street, and a 900 m (0.6 mi) extension from Errol Street to North Melbourne station. In fact, except for the aforementioned 800 m gap, two existing tram routes run along the entire distance from North Richmond station to Errol Street already: route 109 (which runs along Victoria Parade between North Richmond Station and St Vincent's Plaza) and route 57 (which runs along Victoria Street between Elizabeth Street and Errol Street).

In 2018, the Rail Futures Institute proposed many new tram routes, including some that would also require the connection of the currently unconnected tram tracks on Victoria Street in the CBD.

=== New Port Melbourne to St Kilda route ===
Proposed Beaconsfield Parade St Kilda-Port Melbourne route

A 5 km tram link between St Kilda and Port Melbourne along Beaconsfield Parade was first proposed in 2004, subsequently promoted by the City of Port Phillip in 2005 and backed by Tourism Victoria. A 2007 feasibility study into the route found that the high density population could sustain around 200,000 annual commuter trips and that a "shuttle tram" between the two bayside suburbs would be financially viable if patrons were charged $6 per one-way trip.

=== New Route 68, Kew to East Brighton route ===
With the completion of the Melbourne Metro Tunnel relieving the capacity limits of CBD tram lines running parallel along Swanston Street, there are proposals to reconfigure the network. One of these proposals is to replace the Route 16 tram line with a new Route 68 line. (Note: No relation to the former Route 68 tram line that ran from the City to West Coburg) This new route would run from the current Route 16 terminus in Kew, to the current Route 64 terminus in East Brighton. Within the 2021 Level Crossing Removal Project business case for the removal of the at-grade level crossing on Glenferrie Road in Kooyong, the project was flagged as having positive outcomes for the future Route 68 line. Currently that level crossing is where the Route 16 tram line crossed the train tracks of the Glen Waverley line.

=== Four new Sunshine routes ===
Four new tram lines centred on the suburban hub of Sunshine in the middle of Melbourne's Western suburbs were put forward in 2019 by former Victorian Premier, Steve Bracks as part of the Sunshine, Daring to be Great strategy for economic and urban development.

One of these tram lines (potentially named Route 54) would go down Ballarat Road from Sunshine to Highpoint before continuing on to Footscray, presumably using the same lines as route 82. The other three were a tram line to St Albans, Deer Park and Cairnlea down Furlong Road; one to Brooklyn, Altona and Newport; and one to Moonee Ponds, presumably also using the same lines as route 82 after Highpoint.

Some of these proposed tram lines have been considered to be built as trackless trams.

== See also ==
- Trams in Melbourne
- Proposed Melbourne rail extensions
