= Maidstone tram depot =

Tram depot in Melbourne, Australia

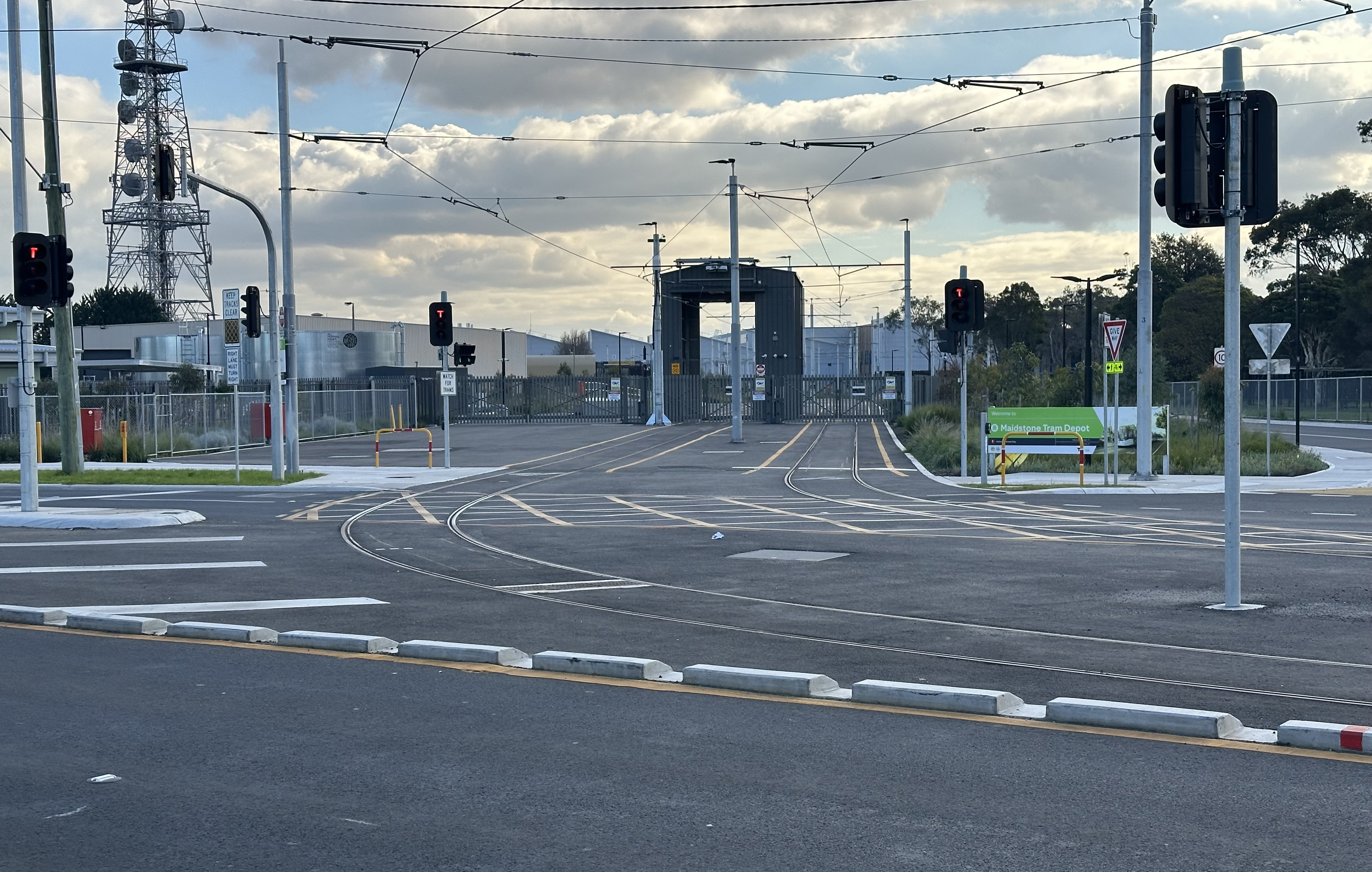
- Maidstone tram depot entrance, July 2026
- Interactive map of Maidstone tram depot

Location
- Location: 61-71 Hampstead Road, Maidstone, Melbourne, Victoria, Australia
- Coordinates: 37°46′34″S 144°52′40″E

Characteristics
- Owner: Victorian Government through VicTrack
- Operator: Alstom for site management and maintenance; With sublease to Yarra Trams
- Depot code: T
- Type: Melbourne trams
- Roads: 11 maintenance tracks; Parking for c. 40 trams
- Rolling stock: G Class
- Routes served: Shared 57, 59, 82

History
- Opened: 2025 (construction completed); 2026 (maintenance activities commenced)

The Maidstone tram depot is a tram maintenance and stabling facility on the Yarra Trams network in Melbourne, Victoria, Australia. It is located on Hampstead Road near the intersection with Williamson Road in Maidstone, in Melbourne's inner west.

Construction of the depot began in 2023 to support Melbourne’s new fleet of G Class trams, with the first tram delivered to the site in September 2025 for testing and commissioning. Linking the depot to the tram network required the construction of short section of new double track along Hampstead Road, connecting with tram route 82 in Williamson Road.

== History ==
=== Site history ===
The site had a number of previous uses. The Defence Department established an explosives factory there in 1942, to support arms manufacture during World War II. In the 1950s, some of the site was occupied by temporary accommodation for migrants, as part of Australia's post-war immigration programme. Following the cessation of supported migrant programs in 1982, part of the site was used for the Maribyrnong Immigration Detention Centre, until it was closed in 2018. From 1989 until 2016, the former migrant accommodation facilities were used by Victoria University for student housing.

=== Use as a tram depot ===
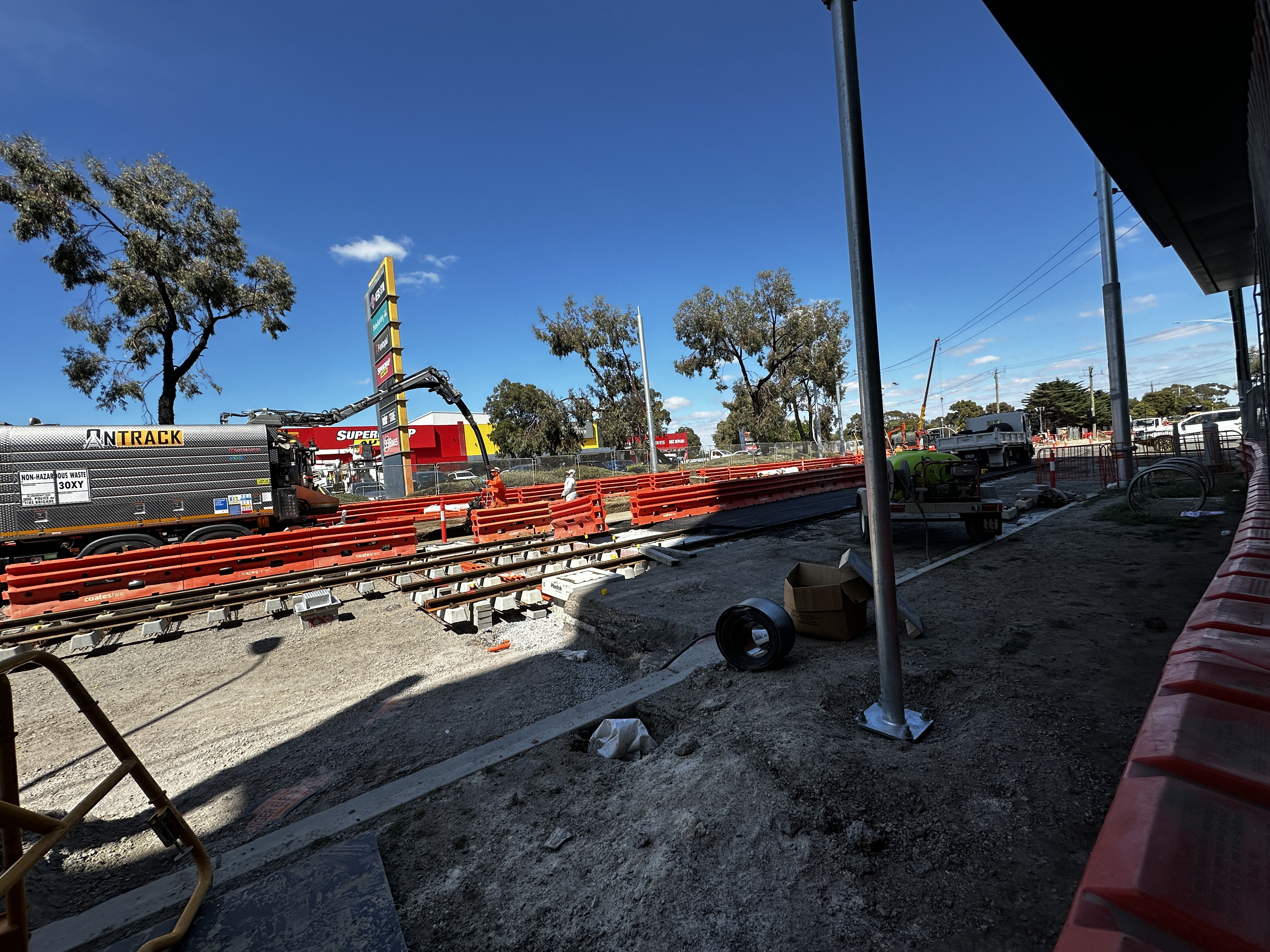
Tram track installation in Williamson Road, November 2024

In November 2021, the Department of Transport announced that a new tram depot would be built on the site, to support the introduction of the "Next Generation Tram" fleet (later designated G Class).

Construction began in 2023, carried out by a John Holland–led alliance responsible for civil works, track installation, and depot buildings. Track installation along Williamson Road commenced in late 2023, with the connection to Route 82 completed in mid‑2025. The first G Class tram (G1.7002) arrived at the depot on 12 September 2025.

The depot is expected to enter full operational service in 2026.

==== Future expansion ====
The depot was designed with long‑term expansion capacity. The stabling yard includes provision for additional tracks to house up to 61 three-section G1 Class trams.

== Design and facilities ==
The Maidstone tram depot was designed as a modern, high‑capacity maintenance and stabling facility for the G Class fleet. The site includes 11 maintenance and stabling tracks, a heavy maintenance workshop, automated inspection systems, and a wheel lathe capable of servicing low‑floor trams.

Sustainability features include:

- rooftop solar photovoltaic systems
- rainwater harvesting for tram washing and landscaping
- recycled and low‑carbon construction materials
- energy‑efficient LED yard lighting
- noise‑reducing track and building treatments

The workshop building contains maintenance pits, overhead gantries, automated lifting equipment, and digital diagnostic tools. Staff facilities include training rooms, operational control spaces, amenities, and secure parking.

== Construction ==
Major construction works included:

- demolition of a part of the former Victoria University Student Village
- site remediation and earthworks
- installation of a new double‑track spur along Williamson Road
- construction of the main workshop and stabling yard
- installation of overhead wiring, substations, and signalling
- commissioning of automated inspection and maintenance equipment

The depot’s buildings were completed in late 2025, enabling the arrival of the first G Class tram for testing.

== Operations ==
The depot is owned by the Victorian Government through VicTrack and leased to Alstom who manage the site, with a sublease to Yarra Trams for stabling purposes. Maintenance of the G Class fleet is carried out by Alstom under a 15‑year maintenance contract associated with the tram supply agreement.

Once fully mobilised, the depot will primarily support operation of Routes 57 and 82, improving reliability and reducing dead‑running in Melbourne’s north‑west. The facility is designed with provision to support up to 60 trams as the G Class fleet expands.

== Transport connections ==
The depot is located adjacent to Hampstead Road and is accessible by several local bus routes, including services to Footscray, Highpoint, and Sunshine. The nearby Route 82 tram line provides direct access to Moonee Ponds and Footscray, enabling efficient movement of trams into and out of service.

== Routes ==
Trams from the following routes will be stabled and maintained at the Maidstone depot:

- 57: West Maribyrnong – City (Elizabeth Street)
- 59: Airport West – City (Elizabeth Street)
- 82: Moonee Ponds Junction – Footscray
