= G class Melbourne tram =

Class of articulated tram operated in Melbourne, Australia

G class
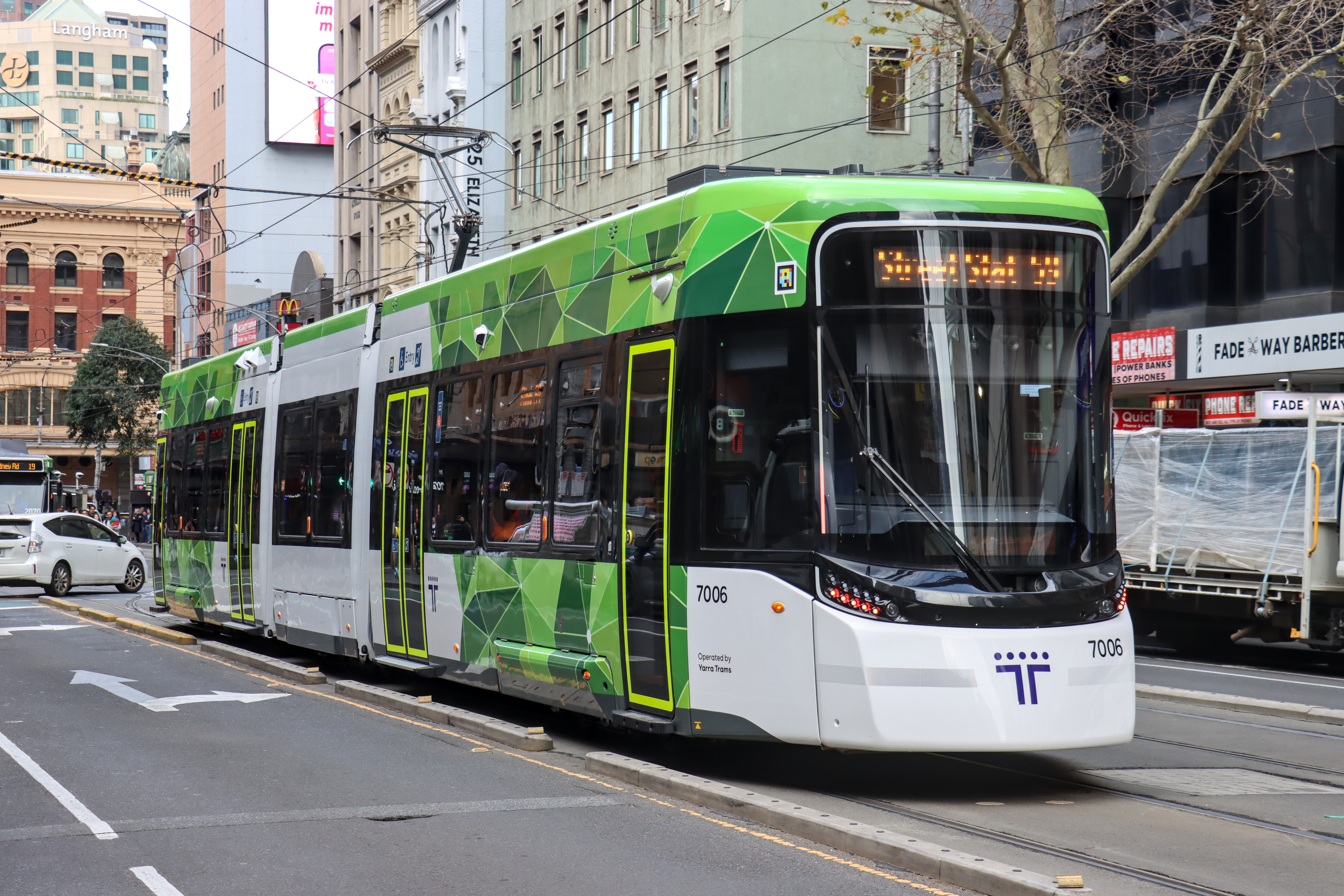
- G class tram 7006 on Elizabeth Street in July 2026

- Interior of a G class tram
- Manufacturer: Alstom
- Built at: Dandenong
- Family name: Flexity 2
- Constructed: 2024–present
- Entered service: 30 July 2026
- Number under construction: 89
- Number built: 11
- Number in service: 1
- Fleet numbers: 7001–7100
- Capacity: 150
- Operator: Yarra Trams
- Depots: Maidstone; Essendon

Specifications
- Train length: ~25 m (82 ft 0 in)
- Low-floor: 100% - though the low floor area is sloped in places and there are steps up to some of the seats
- Doors: 4
- Articulated sections: 3 (2 articulations)
- Maximum speed: 80 km/h (50 mph)
- Traction motors: 4 × Škoda FCX 105 kW (141 hp)
- Power output: 420 kW (560 hp)
- Electric systems: 600 V DC (nominal) from overhead catenary
- Current collection: Pantograph
- UIC classification: Bo′+2′+Bo′
- Track gauge: 1,435 mm (4 ft 8 1/2 in) standard gauge

The G class Melbourne tram is a three-section articulated tram. The trams are low-floor, replacing part of the current fleet of high-floor Z and A class trams. The design is based on the Flexity 2 but with pivoting outer bogies. These trams were introduced onto the Melbourne tram network on 30 July 2026.

The trams have been designed, built and maintained by Alstom, with main manufacturing at its Dandenong factory commencing in late 2023. The Victorian Government's investment also included a new maintenance and stabling facility in Maidstone, with capacity to stable up to 40 trams of the new fleet.

The initial contract was for 100 new trams, which is the largest domestic order in Australian history by value, and included the requirement for Alstom to maintain the vehicles for 15 years. The trams are designed to carry 150 passengers and are 25 metres (82 ft 0 in) long.

The first of the 50 trams of this fleet will initially roll out on routes 57, 59 and 82. As of 2023, these routes are operated out of Essendon depot. The other half of the 50 trams of this fleet will also expand to routes 12, 48 and 58.

== History ==
In 2015, the Andrews Government published a Rolling Stock Strategy. That included ordering new E Class trams, the refurbishment of B Class trams, and commencing the planning of the "next generation of trams". The strategy noted that 240 new trams would be needed during the 2020s, to replace Z and A Class trams. Those older trams have restricted accessibility, whereas all new trams ordered since 2000 have been low-floor models.

=== Bidding process ===
In 2019, the Andrews Government announced that 100 Next Generation trams would be produced in Victoria. The government invited a number of manufacturers to create and submit proposals as part of a collaborative design process.

In the 2020–2021 Victorian Budget, the Andrews Government committed an initial $1.48 billion to the project, including partial funding for a new maintenance and stabling facility, later announced to be built adjacent to the former Maribyrnong Immigration Detention Centre, near Highpoint Shopping Centre. A further $368 million was subsequently provided for construction, supporting the creation of approximately 280 jobs in building and operating the maintenance facility. Alstom (having recently acquired Bombardier Transportation) and a joint venture AlphaMET (comprising UGL Rail and CAF) were shortlisted to design and build the new trams.

=== Contract award ===
In April 2022, the government awarded the contract to Alstom, and announced further details about the Next Generation trams. It was named the G Class, in keeping with the Melbourne tram classification system. Construction was scheduled to commence in late 2023 with the first tram to be delivered in 2025. The construction process was expected to create 1,900 local jobs, both in the construction of the trams and at the new Maidstone facility.

=== Delivery ===
The first of 100 G Class trams, number 7002 was delivered to the Maidstone Tram Depot on 12 September 2025.

=== Entry into service ===
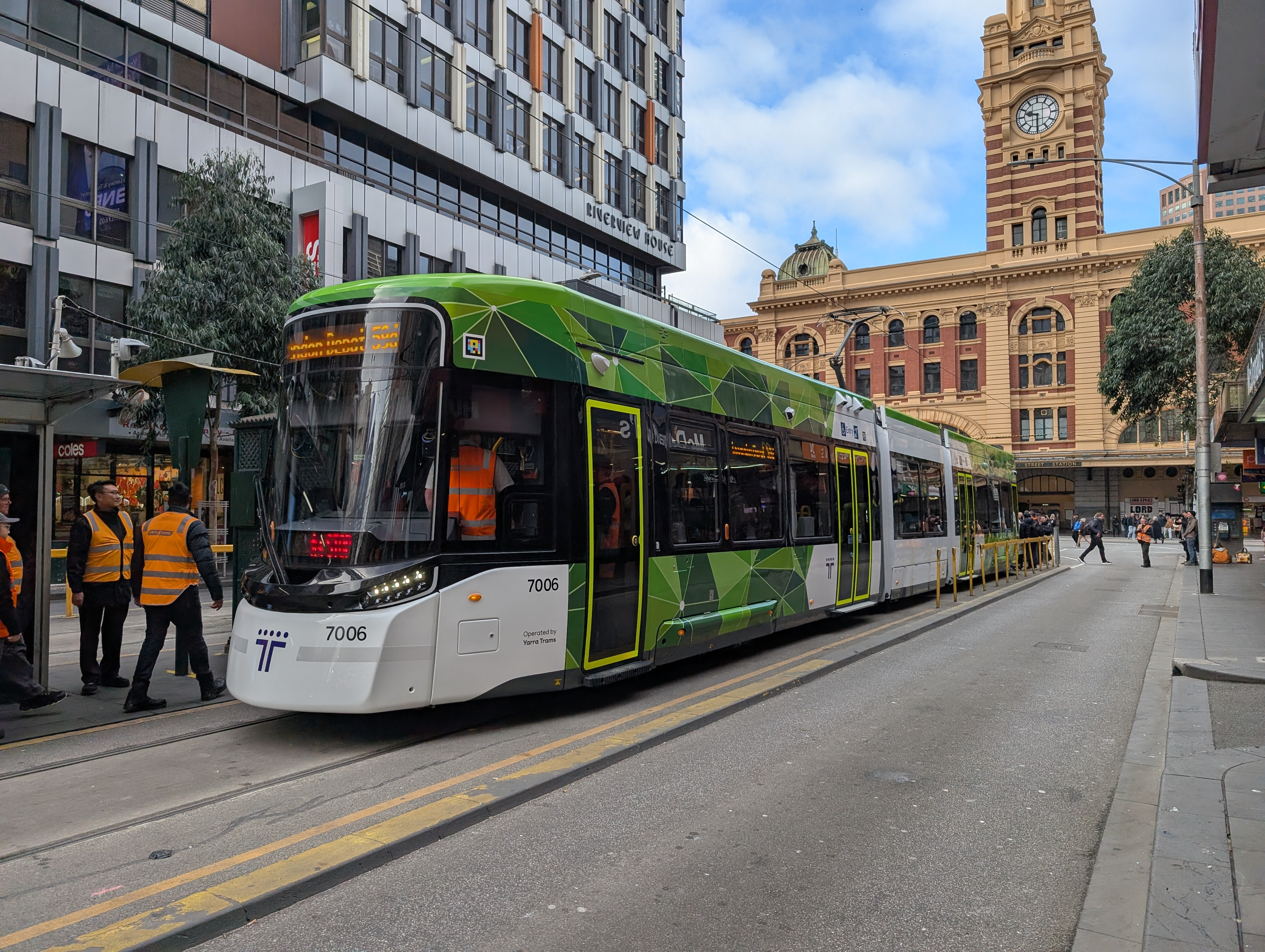
G class tram 7006 on Elizabeth Street on 30 July 2026, the day it entered service

On 30 July 2026, the first G class tram entered service, the first service being the route 59 from Essendon Tram Depot to Flinders Street Station.

== Operations ==
The first of the 50 G Class trams were initially announced in 2023 to run on routes 57, 59 and 82 out of Maidstone tram depot facility. On 10 May 2026, the Victorian Government announced that the other half of the 50 G Class will roll out on routes 12, 48 and 58 as part of the $76 million 2026/27 State Budget.

As of October 2026, G class trams currently operate on the following routes:

- 59: Airport West to Flinders Street Station

G class trams also are planned to operate on the following routes

- 12: Victoria Gardens to St Kilda (Fitzroy Street)
- 48: Victoria Harbour Docklands to North Balwyn
- 57: West Maribyrnong to Flinders Street Station
- 58: Toorak to West Coburg
- 82: Moonee Ponds to Footscray

== Design ==
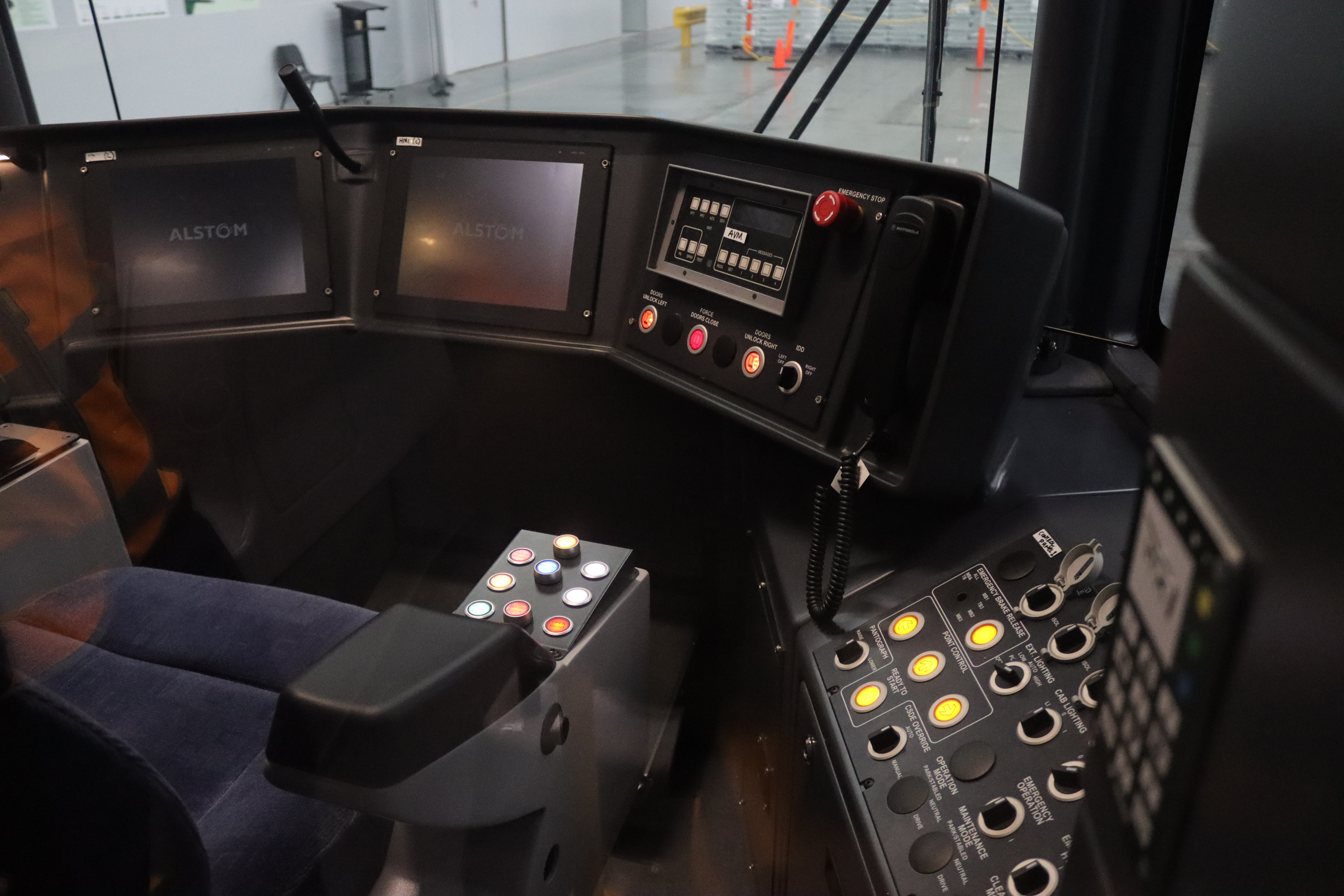
Controls in the driver's cabin

The G class tram is based on the Alstom Flexity 2, which is used on several tram networks around the world, including the Gold Coast G:Link in Queensland. The tram is customised to Melbourne's network and includes a local content requirement of 65% by value. The fleet is designed to use less electric power than the E Class so as not to require new power or traction infrastructure, and utilises onboard battery power storage which is recharged by the overhead lines and regenerative braking, thereby limiting current draw at peak times and reducing overall power use by 30-40%.

Alstom has committed that the new trams will conform with federal disability-access regulations. The G Class is low-floor and includes additional doors for users of wheelchairs and mobility scooters. The Government had consulted extensively with accessibility, passenger, and technical stakeholders during the design process to refine the tram in response to needs and preferences.

The tram is 25 metres (82 ft 0 in) long, designed to hold up to 150 passengers with seating for 48. That makes it smaller than the E Class tram, which can hold 210 passengers and is 33.45 metres (109 ft 9 in) long, but they are able to carry more passengers than the Z or A Class trams.

=== Classification and numbering ===
At the time of contract award in April 2022, the new trams were classified "G Class", in keeping with Melbourne tramway practice to assign a letter-based classification to each different type of vehicle. This was selected as the new fleet is the seventh generation of trams to operate in Melbourne and the letter G is the seventh letter of the alphabet. Vehicles have also received numbers in the '7nnn' series.

== Maidstone tram maintenance and stabling facility ==
Maidstone Tram Depot is a new tram maintenance and stabling facility built in the suburb of Maidstone in suburban Melbourne, Victoria. It started construction in 2023 and opened for tram maintenance and commissioning activities in 2025. The new depot has 11 maintenance roads and stabling for up to 40 trams, with space to be expanded for up to 61 trams in future. It will be the main maintenance location for the new G Class fleet.

The depot is connected to the main Melbourne tram network via a short spur in Hampstead and Williamson roads that connects to Route 82 which currently runs from Moonee Ponds to Footscray. This depot will serve Routes 57, 59 and 82, which currently only run B and Z class high floor trams from the Essendon depot.
