= Maidstone, Victoria =

Maidstone
- Suburb
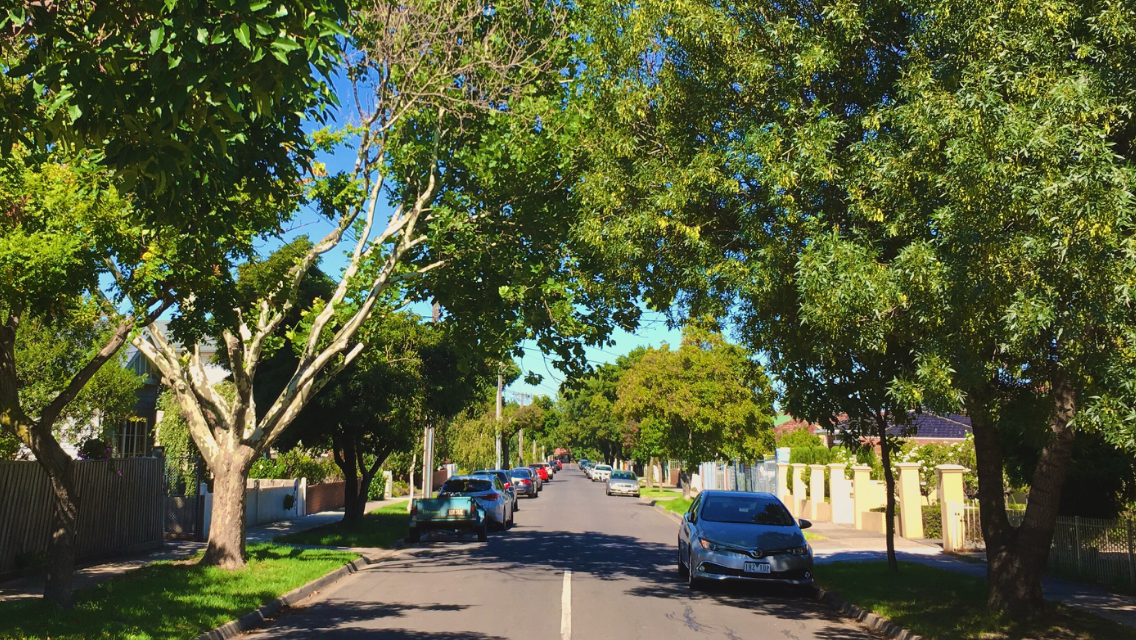
- Street in Maidstone

- Interactive map of Maidstone
- Coordinates: 37.783°S 144.878°E
- Country: Australia
- State: Victoria
- City: Melbourne
- LGA: City of Maribyrnong
- Location: 8 km (5.0 mi) from Melbourne
- Established: 1840s

Government
  - State electorate: Footscray
  - Federal division: Maribyrnong

Area
  - Total: 3.2 km^{2} (1.2 sq mi)
- Elevation: 38 m (125 ft)

Population
  - Total: 9,389 (2021 census)
  - Density: 2,930/km^{2} (7,600/sq mi)
- Postcode: 3012
Suburbs around Maidstone
Avondale Heights	Maribyrnong	Maribyrnong
Braybrook	Maidstone	Maribyrnong
Braybrook	West Footscray	Footscray

Maidstone (/ˈmeɪdstən/ MAYD-stən) is an inner suburb in Melbourne, Victoria, Australia, 8 km (5.0 mi) north-west of Melbourne's Central Business District, located within the City of Maribyrnong local government area. Maidstone recorded a population of 9,389 at the 2021 census.

Maidstone is a largely residential suburb with pockets of light industrial and commercial land use.

== History ==
Maidstone was established in 1858 and named after the town of Maidstone in Kent, England, likely due to its proximity to Footscray, which is also named after a town in Kent (Foots Cray).

Despite early industrial activity, the suburb did not attract much residential development due to the lack of a tram line until 1921. Following World War II, Maidstone began to experience a large influx of settlers.

Maidstone was predominantly made up of period weatherboard, brick Art Deco and Californian Bungalow houses constructed between the 1920s and 1940s. Concrete houses built in the late 1940s to house families of returned servicemen from World War II were also present. From the early 1990s, former factory sites in Maidstone were redeveloped into new residential estates comprising many houses and townhouses. The suburb's redevelopment, public transport availability, and proximity to the CBD saw its median house price grow substantially in the 2000s.

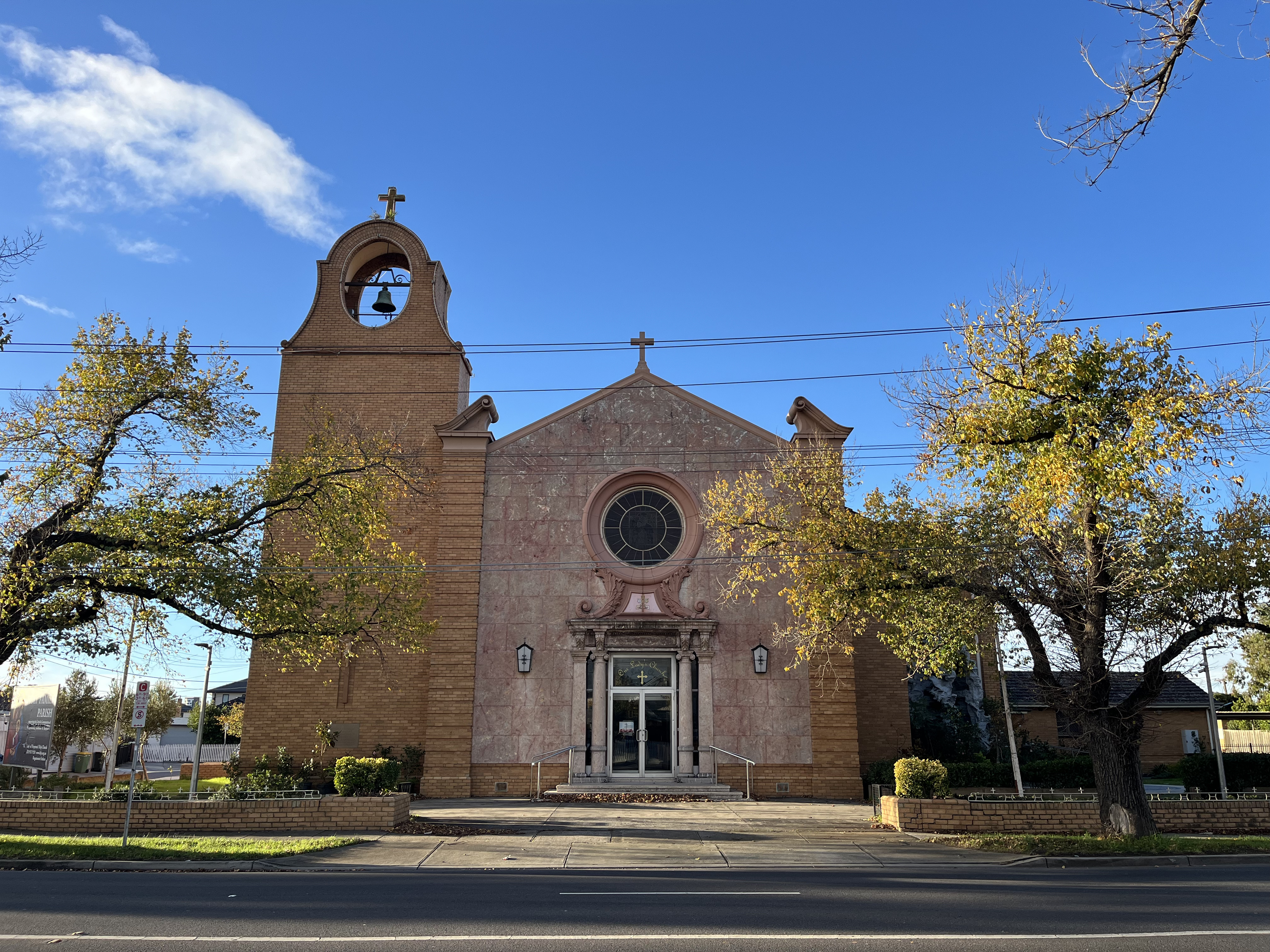
Our Lady's Church on Ballarat Rd

== Geography ==
=== Landmarks ===
- Our Lady of Perpetual Help Catholic Church is a landmark building located on Ballarat Road, established in 1962, and built in Baroque/Byzantine revival architectural styles.
- The Maidstone Islamic Centre on Studley St was established between 1973–1983 in a former Salvation Army hall. Al-Noor Mosque is the second oldest mosque in Melbourne and one of the oldest in Australia.
- The Maidstone Community Centre on Yardley St provides a range of programs and activities focused towards enriching and supporting local residents, alongside spaces and facilities for community use. The centre is adjoined to Ernie Shepherd Gardens.
- The golf course in the north-western corner of Maidstone was opened in 1936 and named after the River Medway that runs through Maidstone, England. After patrons saved it from closure, it began operating as the Medway Golf Club from 1946. The course spans 98 acres, or about 12% of the suburb's total area.
- Maribyrnong River
- Maribyrnong River Trail
- Highpoint Shopping Centre (bordering Maidstone)

=== Parks and gardens ===
- Cambridge Reserve
- Costello Reserve
- Dobson Reserve
- Drey Park
- Ernie Shepherd Gardens (Maidstone Community Centre)
- Eucalyptus Drive Reserve
- Maidstone Tennis Courts and Reserve
- Rogers Reserve
- Scovell Reserve
- Suffolk Triangle Park
- Ulmara Park

=== Places of worship ===
- Our Lady of Perpetual Help Catholic Church (Ballarat Rd)
- Maidstone Mosque (Studley St)
- Hillsong Church (Mitchell St)
- Maidstone Church of Christ (Richelieu St)
- New Apostolic Church (Hampstead Rd)
- Iglesia Ni Cristo (Hampstead Rd)

== Education ==
=== Schools ===
- Maribyrnong College (est. 1958), located in Maribyrnong on the border of Maidstone and Maribyrnong.
- Footscray North Primary School (est. 1924), located in Footscray on the border of Maidstone and Footscray.
- Footscray West Primary School (est. 1915), located in West Footscray.
- Dobson Kindergarten
- North Maidstone Kindergarten
- MacKillop Education Specialist School

== Sports ==
- Footscray United Cricket Club (Scovell Reserve)
- Maidstone Tennis Club (Footscray North Primary School)
- Maidstone United Soccer Club (est. 1987 as Leros United Soccer Club) (Scovell Reserve)
- Medway Golf Club (est. 1946)
- Rosamond Bowling Club (est. 1955)
- Rosamond Tennis Club (est. 1949)

== Transport ==
=== Public transport ===
Tram route 82 provides public transport from Moonee Ponds Junction (Ascot Vale Road / Puckle Street) to Footscray (Leeds Street / Irving Street) passing along northern Maidstone for a segment of its journey. It is one of very few Melbourne tram routes which do not travel through the Melbourne CBD. In 2025, construction of the Maidstone tram depot was completed.

A number of different bus routes pass through Maidstone:

- 220 Sunshine Station ↔ City via Footscray Rd
- 215 Caroline Springs ↔ Highpoint SC
- 223 Yarraville ↔ Highpoint SC
- 408 St Albans Station ↔ Highpoint SC via Sunshine Station
- 406 Keilor East ↔ Footscray via Avondale Heights and Maribyrnong (Night Network)
- 410 Sunshine Station ↔ Footscray via Ballarat Rd (Night Network)

West Footscray and Tottenham stations on the Sunbury Line are the closest railway stations to Maidstone, while bus/tram routes connect more directly with Footscray and Sunshine stations.

=== Active transport ===
The Maribyrnong River Trail connects cyclists to the Footscray Road off-road path and into Docklands and the Melbourne CBD.

== Notable people ==
- Albert Facey, author of A Fortunate Life and Gallipoli, born in Maidstone in 1894; a street is named after him in the eastern part of Maidstone, as well as a commemorative plaque.

== See also ==
- City of Sunshine – Maidstone was previously within this former local government area.
