= Essendon tram depot =

Tram depot in metropolitan Melbourne, Victoria, Australia

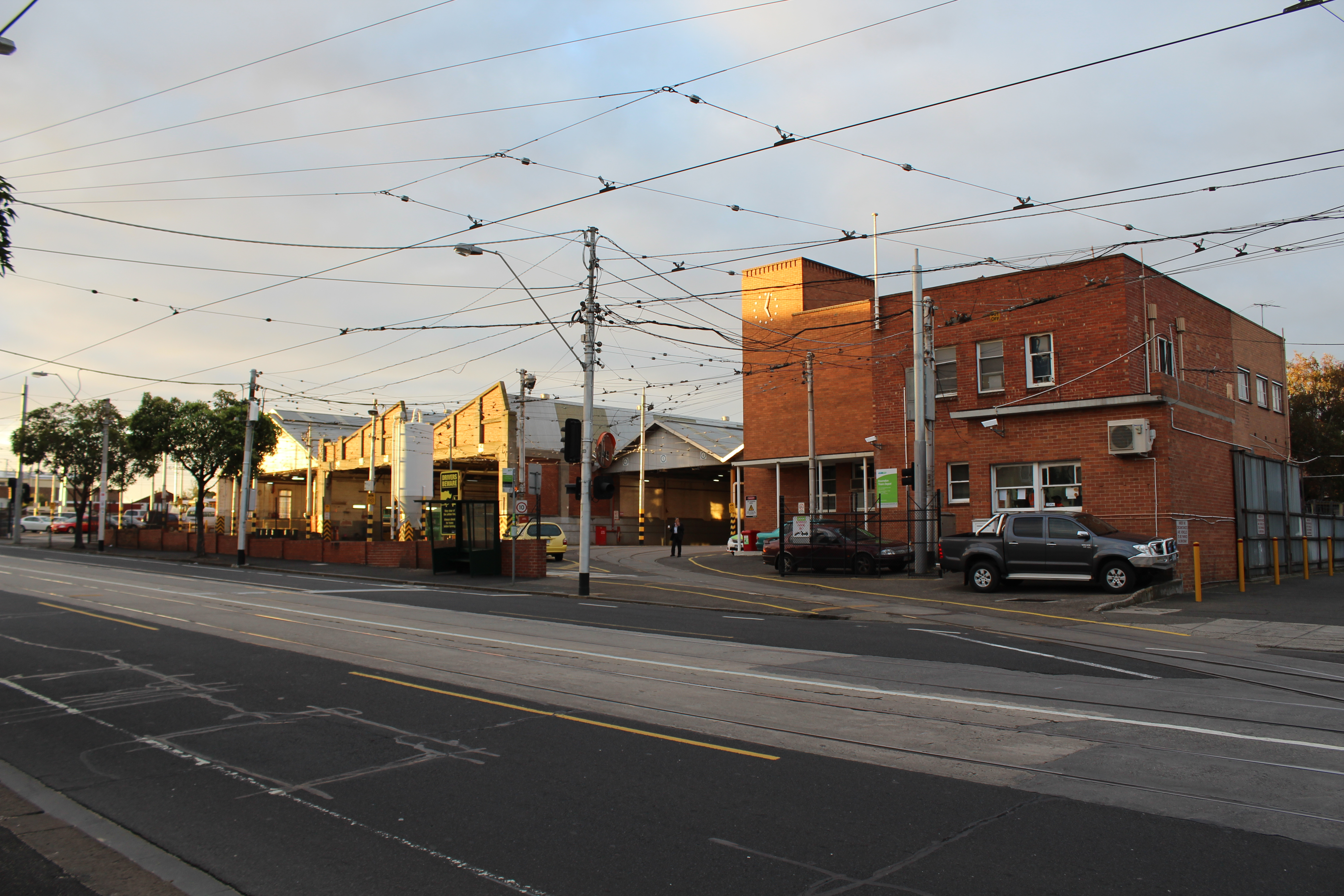
- The depot, viewed from the southern gate, 2013
- Interactive map of Essendon tram depot

Location
- Location: Mount Alexander Road, Travancore, Melbourne, Victoria, Australia
- Coordinates: 37°46′44″S 144°55′53″E

Characteristics
- Owner: VicTrack
- Operator: Yarra Trams
- Depot code: E
- Roads: 24 (18 in shed, 6 outside)
- Rolling stock: 31 B2 Class; 24 Z3 Class; 1 G Class
- Routes served: 57, 58 (shared with Southbank), 59, 82

History
- Opened: 11 October 1906; 120 years ago
- Original: North Melbourne Electric Tramway & Lighting Company

History
- Built: 1906–1944
- Built by: George Meyer (1906); Thompson & Chalmers (1924); Massey & Sons (1924); McDougall & Ireland (1942); E. A. Watts (1944)

Site notes
- Architect(s): Ussher and Kemp
- Architectural styles: Federation; Edwardian; Federation Free Classical

Victorian Heritage Register
- Official name: Essendon tramway depot
- Type: Registered place
- Designated: 24 October 1996
- Reference no.: H1215
- Heritage overlay no.: HO141
- Category: Transport - Tramways

The Essendon tram depot is a tram depot located on Mount Alexander Road, Travancore, a suburb of Melbourne, Victoria, Australia. Operated by Yarra Trams, it is one of eight tram depots on the Melbourne tram network. Despite the name, the depot is located three kilometres (two miles) from the suburb of Essendon.

== History ==
The Essendon tram depot was opened on 11 October 1906 by the North Melbourne Electric Tramway & Lighting Company to serve its lines through Essendon and Maribyrnong. Its functions were assumed by the Melbourne & Metropolitan Tramways Board on 1 August 1922. When the Public Transport Corporation was privatised in August 1999, the Essendon depot passed to M>Tram. It passed to Yarra Trams when it took control of the entire tram network in April 2004.

== Layout ==
Essendon depot has 24 roads, 18 of which are covered in three sheds, the remaining six are in the open to the north of the sheds. It has access from Mount Alexander Road in both directions, and also features facilities for heavy maintenance.

== Rolling stock ==
As of June 2026, the depot had an allocation of 55 trams: 31 B2 Class and 24 Z3 Class trams.

== Routes ==
The following routes are operated from Essendon depot:

- : West Maribyrnong to Flinders Street Station
- : West Coburg to Toorak shared with Southbank depot
- : Airport West to Flinders Street Station
- : Moonee Ponds Junction to Footscray

== Heritage curtail ==
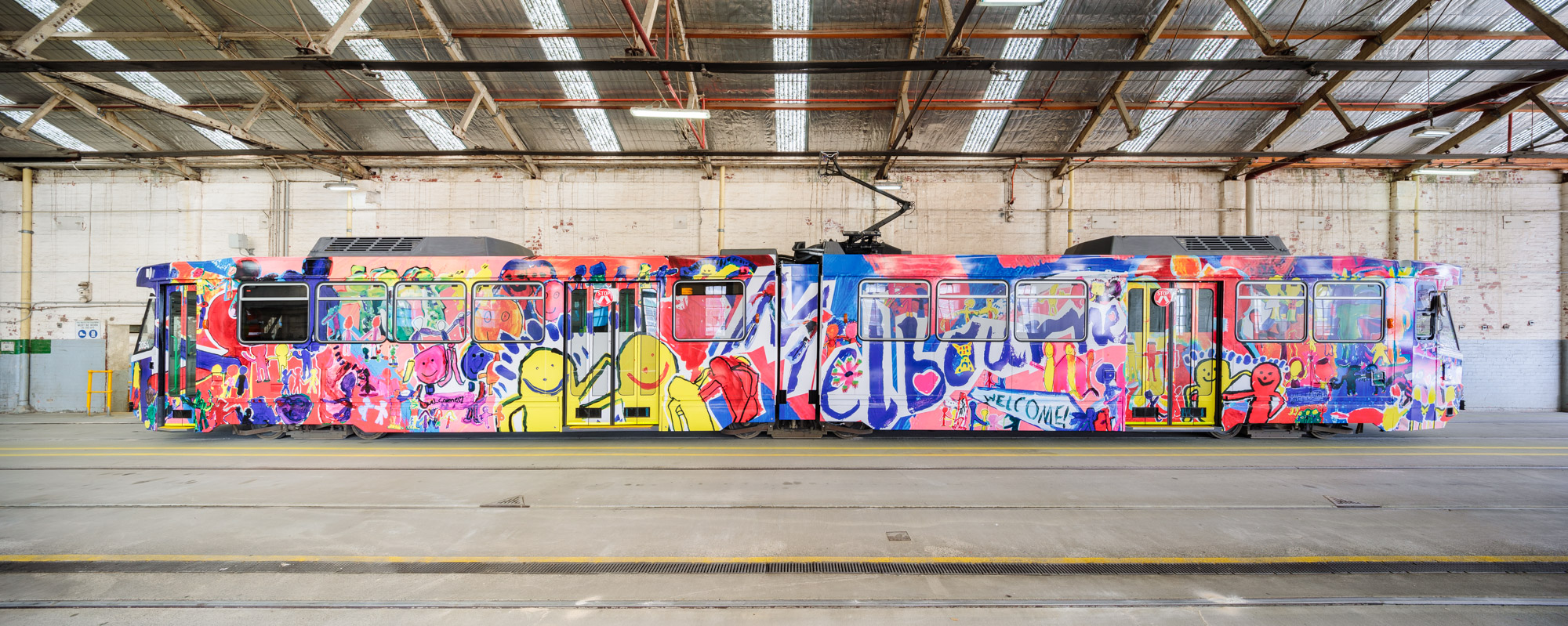
A tram, inside the depot, painted by Year 3 students as part of the Melbourne Festival, 2019

The tram depot was added to the Victorian Heritage Register on 24 October 1996 in recognition of its historic and architectural importance.

The gable roofed car shed, designed by Ussher and Kemp architects, and built by George Meyer of Ascot Vale, is the only extant part of the original depot. After the Essendon tramway was taken over by the Melbourne & Metropolitan Tramways Board in 1922 a saw tooth roof extension to the original car shed, constructed by Thompson & Chalmers Pty Ltd, was made in 1924, and an overhead tower wagon shed was erected by Massey & Sons. A further extension to the car shed was built by McDougall & Ireland in 1941-42, and the two storey brick office building, erected by E. A. Watts, was added in 1944.

== See also ==
- Trams in Melbourne
- List of places on the Victorian Heritage Register in the City of Moonee Valley
