= Maribyrnong Road =

Road in Melbourne, Australia

Maribyrnong Road Victoria
- Coordinates: 37.770107°S 144.901597°E (West end); 37.772721°S 144.926933°E (East end)

General information
- Type: Road
- Length: 2.2 km (1.4 mi)
- Route number(s): Metro Route 38 (1965–present) Entire route; Concurrencies: Metro Route 37 (1965–present) (through western Moonee Ponds)

Major junctions
- West end: Raleigh Road; Moonee Ponds, Melbourne
- Orford Street; Ascot Vale Road; Mount Alexander Road
- East end: Ormond Road; Ascot Vale, Melbourne

Location(s)
- Major suburbs: Moonee Ponds, Ascot Vale

Maribyrnong Road is a major road in northwestern Melbourne, Australia. Named after the Maribyrnong River, the road forms the boundary between the suburbs of Moonee Ponds and Ascot Vale for its entire length. It runs almost exactly east–west across the City of Moonee Valley, from the Maribyrnong River to Mount Alexander Road, another major road that links the city centre with the airport.

== Route ==
Maribyrnong Road starts at the eastern end of the Raleigh Road bridge over the Maribyrnong River and heads east as a four-lane, single-carriageway road, crossing the Craigieburn railway line, and supporting surface trams tracks until the intersection with Ascot Vale Road, where they turn north. The road continues a short distance east until it ends at the intersection with Mount Alexander Road; the road continues east as Ormond Road.

Melbourne tram route 82 runs east from the Raleigh Road bridge, to turn north along Ascot Vale Road, with the route 57 tram also sharing the tracks before turning south along Union Road.

== History ==
The Raleigh Road bridge, crossing the Maribyrnong River easterly and connecting directly to the western end of Maribyrnong Road, replaced two older bridges. Previously, road and tram traffic crossed the river on separate bridges: the former Raleigh Road bridge on a dog-leg alignment just to the north of the current bridge for vehicular traffic (designed by John Monash) dating from 1911, and a timber trestle bridge solely for trams crossing the river on a direct route dating from 1940, to serve the explosives factories on the western side of the Maribyrnong during WWII. While the trestle bridge was originally built only for trams, a 2.25-foot (0.69 m) gangway was bolted to the tram sleepers for pedestrian access, providing a 100-yard (91 m) short-cut from the neighbouring bridge for motorists (which had only one footpath). However, the council pushed for a replacement due to safety concerns, after reports of pedestrians falling through the trestles and drowning. Construction started in 1964, with the present-day bridge built in place of the old tram bridge, one abutment at a time, to in order to maintain tram services during construction, and the road bridge demolished afterwards. The new bridge, with seven spans 478 feet (146 m) long, carrying a roadway 50 feet (15 m) between kerbs with two 7 feet (2.1 m) footpaths, opened in 1967. A vestigial road alignment leading to the former Raleigh Road bridge survives as Anglers Way, on the western side of the river just to the north of the current bridge.

Maribyrnong Road was signed as Metropolitan Route 38 between Moonee Ponds and Ascot Vale in 1965. Metropolitan Route 37 runs concurrent along Maribyrnong Road from the Raleigh Road bridge over the Maribyrnong River to Orford Street 200m to the east.

The passing of the Road Management Act 2004 granted the responsibility of overall management and development of Victoria's major arterial roads to VicRoads: in 2004, VicRoads re-declared the road as part of Ascot Vale-Keilor Road (Arterial #5864), beginning at the Maribyrnong River and ending at Mount Alexander Road in Ascot Vale. The road is still presently known (and signposted) as Maribyrnong Road along its entire length.

Due to the increasing amount of pedestrian and bicycle traffic over the Raleigh Road bridge, a $2.7 million project to widen the paths to 3 metres on each side of the bridge was started early January 2021, completed nearly two months later at the end of February 2021.

== Major intersections ==
Maribyrnong Road is entirely contained within the City of Moonee Valley local government area.

| Location | km | mi | Destinations | Notes |
|---|---|---|---|---|
| Maribyrnong River | 0.0 | 0.0 | Raleigh Road Bridge | |
| Moonee Ponds–Ascot Vale boundary | 0.0 | 0.0 | Raleigh Road (Metro Routes 37/38) – Maribyrnong, Sunshine, Williamstown | Western terminus of road and concurrency with Metro Route 37; Metro Routes 37 and 38 continue west over bridge along Raleigh Road |
| Moonee Ponds–Ascot Vale boundary | 0.2 | 0.12 | Orford Street (Metro Route 37 north) – Essendon, Essendon Fields; Walter Street (south) – Ascot Vale | Eastern terminus of concurrency with Metro Route 37 |
| Moonee Ponds–Ascot Vale boundary | 0.3 | 0.19 | Epsom Road (south) – Flemington, North Melbourne; Scotia Street (north) – Moonee Ponds | |
| Moonee Ponds–Ascot Vale boundary | 1.3 | 0.81 | Union Road – Flemington, Moonee Ponds | |
| Moonee Ponds–Ascot Vale boundary | 1.7 | 1.1 | Craigieburn railway line | |
| Moonee Ponds–Ascot Vale boundary | 2.0 | 1.2 | Ascot Vale Road (Metro Route 35) – Broadmeadows, Flemington, Williamstown | |
| Moonee Ponds–Ascot Vale boundary | 2.2 | 1.4 | Mount Alexander Road – Strathmore, Essendon, North Melbourne | |
| Moonee Ponds–Ascot Vale boundary | 2.2 | 1.4 | Ormond Road (Metro Route 38) – Fitzroy North, Fairfield | Eastern terminus of road, Metro Route 38 continues east along Ormond Road |
1.000 mi = 1.609 km; 1.000 km = 0.621 mi: Concurrency terminus; Route transition
