= Melbourne tram route 48 =

Tram route in metropolitan Melbourne, Victoria, Australia

Route 48

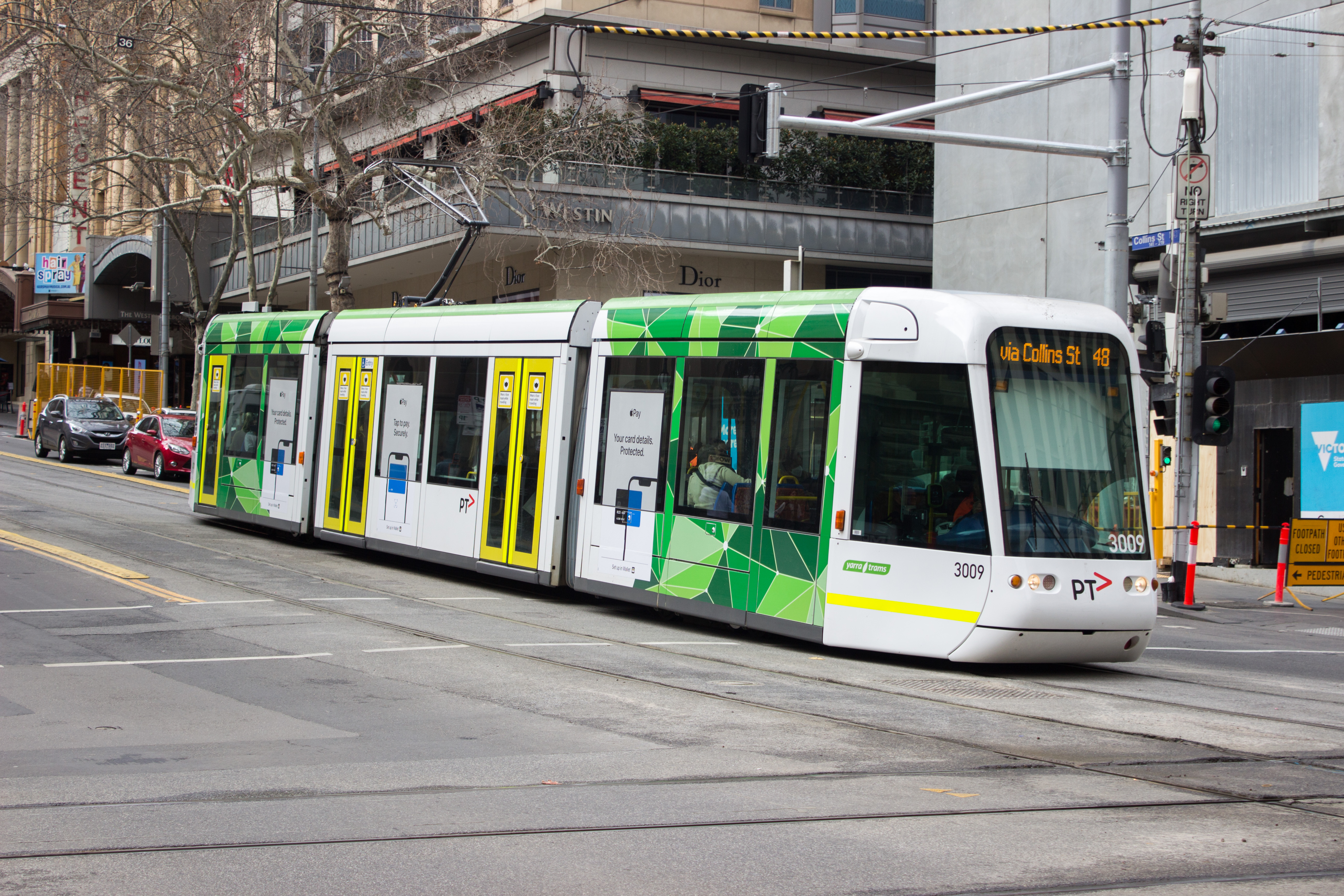
- C class tram crosses the Collins Street and Swanston Street intersection, August 2022

Overview
- System: Melbourne tramway network
- Operator: Yarra Trams
- Depot: Kew
- Vehicle: A class C class
- Began service: 11 December 1938

Route
- Start: North Balwyn
- Via: Kew East; Kew; Hawthorn; Richmond; East Melbourne
- End: Victoria Harbour
- Length: 13.5 kilometres
- Timetable: Route 48 timetable
- Map: Route 48 map

Melbourne tram route 48 is a tram route on the Melbourne tramway network serving the city of Melbourne in Victoria, Australia. Operated by Yarra Trams, the route is coloured black and extends from North Balwyn to Victoria Harbour over 13.5-kilometre (8.4 mi) of double track via Kew East, Kew, Hawthorn, Richmond and East Melbourne. It is serviced out of Kew depot utilising A and C class trams and in the future G class trams.

== History ==
The origins of route 48 lie in separate lines. The section between Flinders Street (near Stop 9) and Hawthorn Bridge (Stop 23) dates back to Melbourne's first cable tram line to Richmond, which opened on 11 November 1885. It was electrified in stages, finally commencing electric operations on 4 December 1927. The section between Southern Cross station (Stop 1) and Spring Street (Stop 8) opened on 2 October 1886 as the North Fitzroy line. It was electrified on 21 November 1929. These two lines are connected by a line that was built along Spring Street on 10 November 1993 as part of the City Circle tram line works. The section between Barkers Road (Stop 29) and Cotham Road (Stop 33) was built by the Prahran & Malvern Tramways Trust on 24 February 1915. The track between Cotham Road and Kew Cemetery (Stop 37) opened later that year on 8 May, and then extended to Harp Road (Stop 39) on 26 November. The Melbourne & Metropolitan Tramways Board opened Church Street line between Barkers Road and Hawthorn Bridge on 7 July 1923. An extension from Harp Road to Burke Road (Stop 45) opened on 11 January 1925. The line between Burke Road and Bulleen Road (Stop 47) opened on 13 June 1937, and the rest of the line to North Balwyn opened on 11 December 1938.

Route 48 was first allocated to the line between North Balwyn and the City on 11 December 1938 with the opening of the North Balwyn extension. Prior to that point, services on the East Kew line were largely provided by route 40, which ran from Kew East (Bulleen Road) to the City. Trams traditionally would usually terminate at the Lonsdale Street terminus on Spencer Street, but peak hour congestion at the terminus often meant that trams would often run through to La Trobe Street, or would truncate at the corner of Flinders and Spencer Streets. After the construction of a siding north of La Trobe Street in 1993, route 48 trams were extended to terminate there along with route 75. However, it proved to be difficult for the siding to handle peak hour congestion with route 75, so route 48 was amended to terminate at Flinders Street West from 3 September 2000. On 4 May 2003, the line was extended to the intersection of Bourke Street and Harbour Esplanade, Docklands. On 4 January 2005, route 48 was extended along Harbour Esplanade and Docklands Drive to Waterfront City.

Between May and November 2005, the route temporarily terminated at Market Street due to the closure and removal of the Flinders Street Overpass over King Street. The truncated section between La Trobe Street and Waterfront City was temporarily replaced by routes 30 and 86.

On 20 September 2009, route 48 was altered to run via Collins Street in lieu of Flinders Street, terminating at Victoria Harbour (Merchant Street). The route along Flinders Street and Harbour Esplanade to Waterfront City was replaced by an extended route 70. On 26 January 2014, the route was extended westwards by one more stop to terminate at the intersection of Collins Street and Bourke Street, which became the new Victoria Harbour terminus.

Melbourne tram route 48 evolution
Dates	Route	Notes
11 December 1938 - 2 September 2000	North Balwyn to City (Spencer/La Trobe Streets)	via Bridge Road, Flinders Street and Spencer Street
3 September 2000 - 3 May 2003	North Balwyn to City (Flinders/Spencer Street)	via Bridge Road and Flinders Street
4 May 2003 - 3 January 2005	North Balwyn to Docklands (Harbour Esplanade/Bourke Street)	via Bridge Road and Flinders Street
4 January 2005 - 19 September 2009	North Balwyn to Waterfront City	via Bridge Road and Flinders Street; Temporarily terminated at Flinders / Market Streets between 22 May and 20 November 2005 due to the closure and removal of the Flinders Street Overpass
20 September 2009 - 25 January 2014	North Balwyn to Victoria Harbour (Collins / Merchant Streets)	via Bridge Road and Collins Street
26 January 2014 - present	North Balwyn to Victoria Harbour (Collins / Bourke Streets)	via Bridge Road and Collins Street

== Operation ==
Route 48 is operated out of Kew depot with A and C class trams, and will be operated with G class trams in the future as announced as part of the $76 million 2026/27 State Budget.

== Proposed extension ==
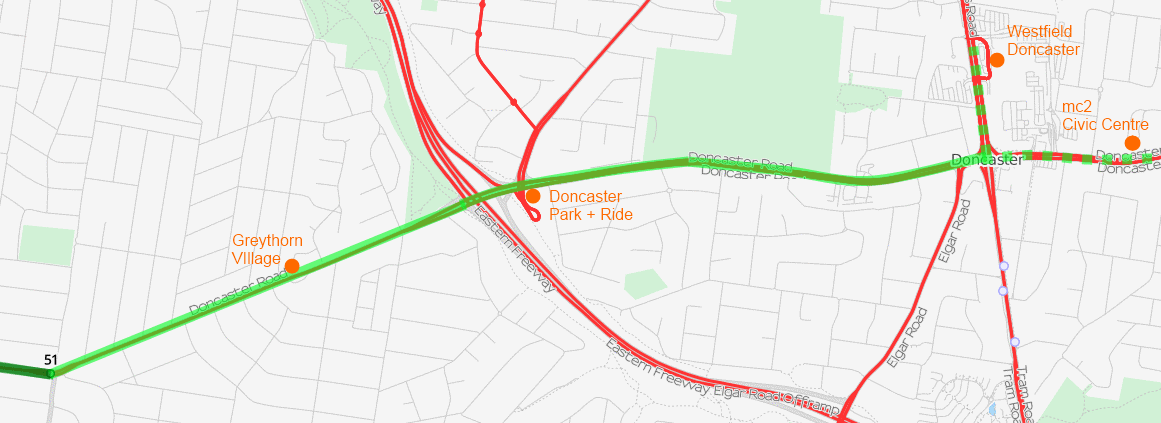
Map of the proposed extension to the Route 48.

The Public Transport Users Association (PTUA) and Cities of Boroondara and Manningham have been lobbying for an extension of route 48 to Westfield Doncaster. It would require approximately 4.5 km (2.8 mi) of extra track, serving Greythorn Village and the Doncaster Park and Ride facility before terminating near Westfield Doncaster. The PTUA has also pointed out the future potential for the line to be extended further along Doncaster Road to Doncaster East and Donvale.

Proponents have argued that it could serve as a cheaper, quicker and more efficient alternative to the long-proposed Doncaster railway line. However, supporters of the railway state that the tram already takes 50 minutes from one terminus to the other in the off-peak, and that the tram would take well over an hour to reach the city from Doncaster. It is therefore considered as a separate project to the heavy railway, that would serve a local access purpose.

In the lead up to the 2006 state election, the Ted Baillieu opposition promised the extension by July 2010, pricing it at $35 million. It was stated that there would have been about two accessible stops every kilometre, similar to the recent Box Hill tram extension. However the government was returned and the Baileu government did not commit to it in the 2010 election.

The City of Manningham commissioned a $60,000 study in 2007 to investigate the potential for the new line, arguing it was a needed alternative to overcrowded buses.

== Route map ==
Interactive map of Melbourne tram route 48.
