= Melbourne tram route 82 =

Tram route in metropolitan Melbourne, Victoria, Australia

Route 82

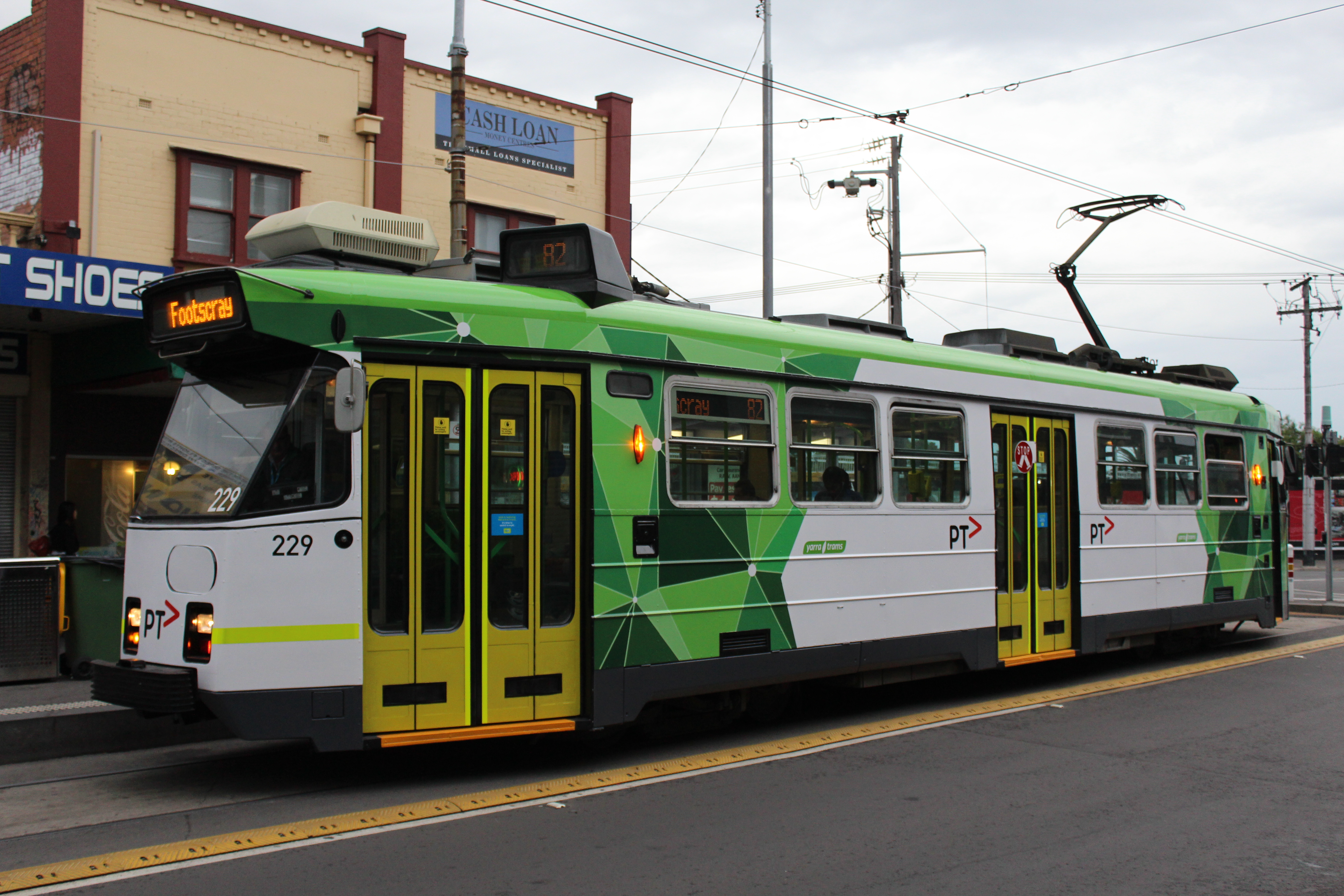
- Z class tram at Footscray terminus in May 2013

Overview
- System: Melbourne
- Operator: Yarra Trams
- Depot: Essendon
- Vehicle: Z class G class (future)
- Began service: 2 May 1954

Route
- Start: Moonee Ponds Junction
- Via: Maribyrnong; Ascot Vale
- End: Footscray station
- Length: 9.2 kilometres
- Timetable: Route 82 timetable
- Map: Route 82 map

Melbourne tram route 82 is operated by Yarra Trams on the Melbourne tram network from Moonee Ponds Junction to Footscray railway station. It is one of only two tram routes which does not travel through the Melbourne CBD, the other being route 78. Part of its route is the last surviving segment of the Footscray tram network. It commenced operating on 2 May 1954.

The 9.2 kilometre route is operated out of Essendon depot with Z class trams.

The route passes The Highpoint Shopping Centre in Maribyrnong. A short section (less than 700 metres) of the route is a light rail reserve track parallel to Wests Road, Maribyrnong. The route overlaps route 57 between the intersection of Maribyrnong and Union Roads, Ascot Vale, and Raleigh and Wests Roads, Maribyrnong.

On 12 November 1961 trams on Sunday were replaced on route 82 by buses. In January 1993, the Kennett government announced it proposed to withdraw route 82. However it was not implemented and Sunday trams were reinstated on 8 August 1993.

Until January 2016, route 82 trams terminated south of Moonee Ponds Junction in the middle of the Ascot Vale Road. After the stop was rebuilt, route 82 trams were extended to terminate at the main platforms with a headshunt built to the north.

Unlike most other tram routes, route 82 does not operate within close proximity of its depot to allow crew transfers en route. Hence at the beginning and end of shifts, trams operate from and to Essendon depot. Although not advertised in the public timetables, passengers can use these, with trams operating along Mount Alexander Road via route 59. This will be the case until 2025 when the Maidstone tram depot near the route is built, and G-class trams stabled at the depot will roll out onto the route. In August 2024, a consultation was launched by the Department of Transport & Planning to reduce the number of stops on the route.

== Route map ==
Interactive map of Melbourne tram route 82.
