= Melbourne tram route 59 =

Tram route in metropolitan Melbourne, Victoria, Australia

Route 59

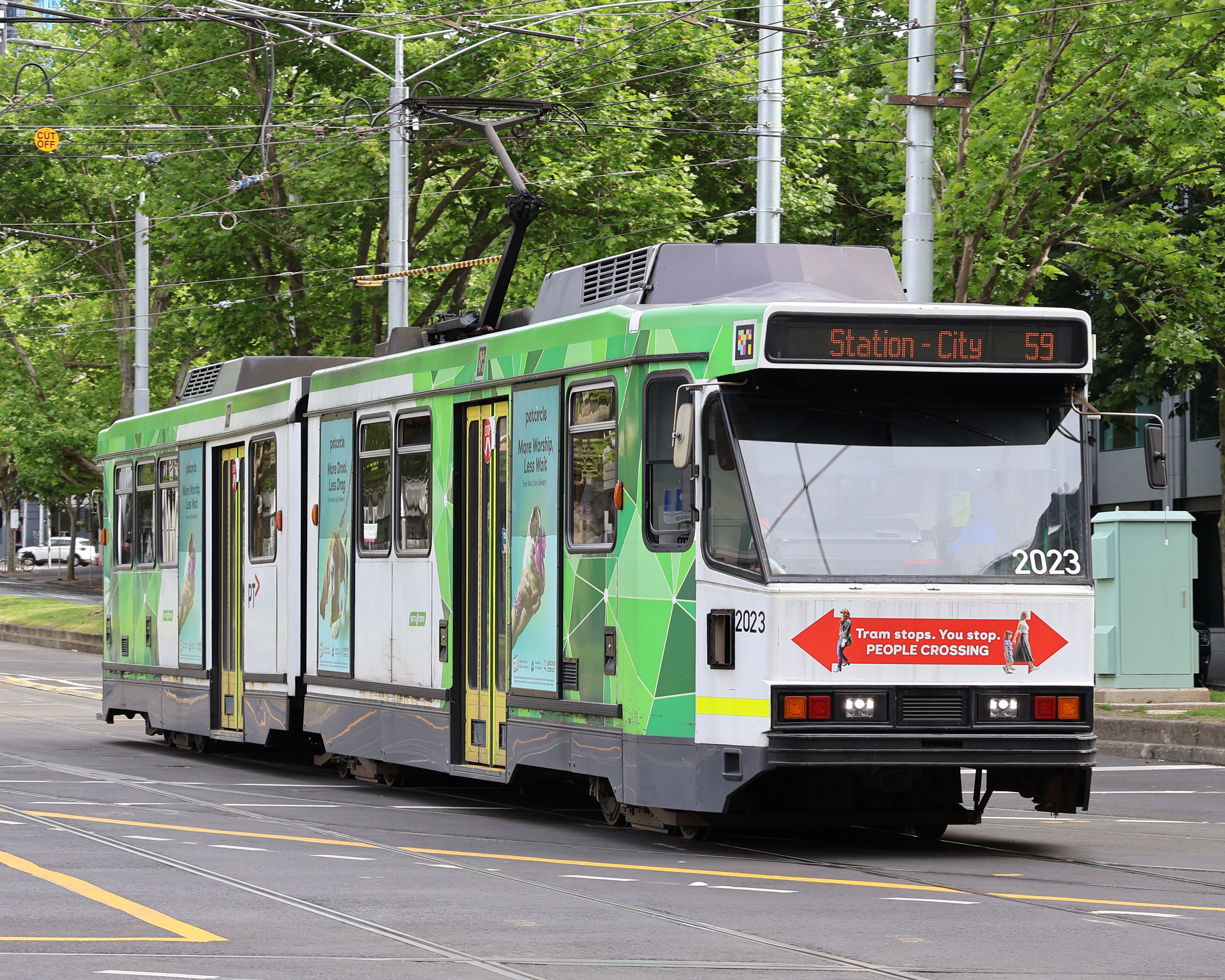
- B class tram along Elizabeth Street near Queen Victoria Market, December 2025

Overview
- System: Melbourne
- Operator: Yarra Trams
- Depot: Essendon
- Vehicle: B class G class
- Began service: 16 May 1943

Route
- Start: Airport West
- Via: Niddrie; Essendon; Moonee Ponds Junction; Ascot Vale; Flemington; North Melbourne; Elizabeth Street
- End: Flinders Street station
- Length: 14.7 kilometres
- Timetable: Route 59 timetable
- Map: Route 59 map

Melbourne tram route 59 is a tram route on the Melbourne tramway network serving the city of Melbourne in Victoria, Australia. Operated by Yarra Trams, the route is coloured dark green and extends from Airport West to Flinders Street station over 14.7 kilometre of double track via Niddrie, Essendon, Moonee Ponds Junction, Ascot Vale, Flemington, North Melbourne and Elizabeth Street. It is serviced out of Essendon depot and Maidstone tram depot by B and G class trams. Z class trams also occasionally operate on route 59 during peak hour.

== History ==
Route 59 was first allocated to the line between Essendon Aerodrome and the Elizabeth Street terminus on 16 May 1943, when the Essendon line was extended to the Essendon Airport. Prior to that, route 59 had been allocated to the Williamstown Road line on the Footscray system, but numbers were never really used since the single-truck trams that ran the line didn't have route number boxes. Trams from Essendon had always terminated at Elizabeth Street, though before the Brunswick cable tram line was converted in 1936, they instead terminated on William Street. During the years when Essendon airport was Melbourne's primary airport, airlines usually transported passengers to the airport for free, the tram to Essendon Aerodrome was usually only used by airport workers. Thus when Tullamarine Airport opened in 1970, the line became of little use, and along with the fact that the line dangerously crossed the Tullamarine Freeway at grade, it was decided to truncate the line to terminate at Hawker Street, Airport West on 7 October 1976. On 22 December 1992, the line was extended by 1.2 kilometres to Airport West Shopping Centre.

The origins of Route 59 lie in separate lines. The oldest section of the line is between Flinders Street station (Stop 1) and Haymarket (Stop 9) was originally constructed as part of the Brunswick cable tram line, which opened on 1 October 1887. This line was converted to electric traction on 29 December 1936. The section of track between Abbotsford Street (near Stop 20) and Flemington Bridge station (Stop 22) was also originally part of the cable network as the North Melbourne line, which was converted to electric traction on 19 July 1925. The line between Abbotsford Street and Haymarket was constructed and opened by the Melbourne & Metropolitan Tramways Board on the same day. The section between Flemington Bridge and Keilor Road (near Stop 46) was originally opened by the North Melbourne Electric Tramway & Lighting Company on 11 October 1906. This line was extended to Gilles Street (near Stop 49) on 7 July 1923, and then again to Birdwood Street (near Stop 51) on 7 February 1937. The line to Hawker Street (Stop 57) opened on 16 May 1943 as part of the Essendon Aerodrome line. The rest of the line to Airport West opened on 22 December 1992.

The G-class trams were introduced to the route 59 on 30 July 2026, the first service being the Essendon tram depot to Flinders Street Station service.

Melbourne tram route 59 evolution
Dates	Route	Notes
c. 1934- 21 December 1940	Williamstown Road to Footscray	Never used as single-truck trams on the line had no number plates
22 December 1940 - 15 May 1943	Unallocated	
16 May 1943 - 6 October 1976	Essendon Aerodrome to Flinders Street station	
7 October 1976 - 21 December 1992	Airport West (Hawker Street) to Flinders Street station	
22 December 1992 - present	Airport West to Flinders Street station	

== Route ==
Interactive map of Melbourne tram route 59.

The route starts at the corner of Matthews Avenue and Rodd Road, Airport West and operates via Niddrie, Essendon, Moonee Ponds Junction, Ascot Vale, Flemington, North Melbourne and Elizabeth Street to terminate at Flinders Street station.

== Operation ==
Route 59 is operated out of Essendon depot with B and G-class trams. Occasionally, Z class trams are also used.

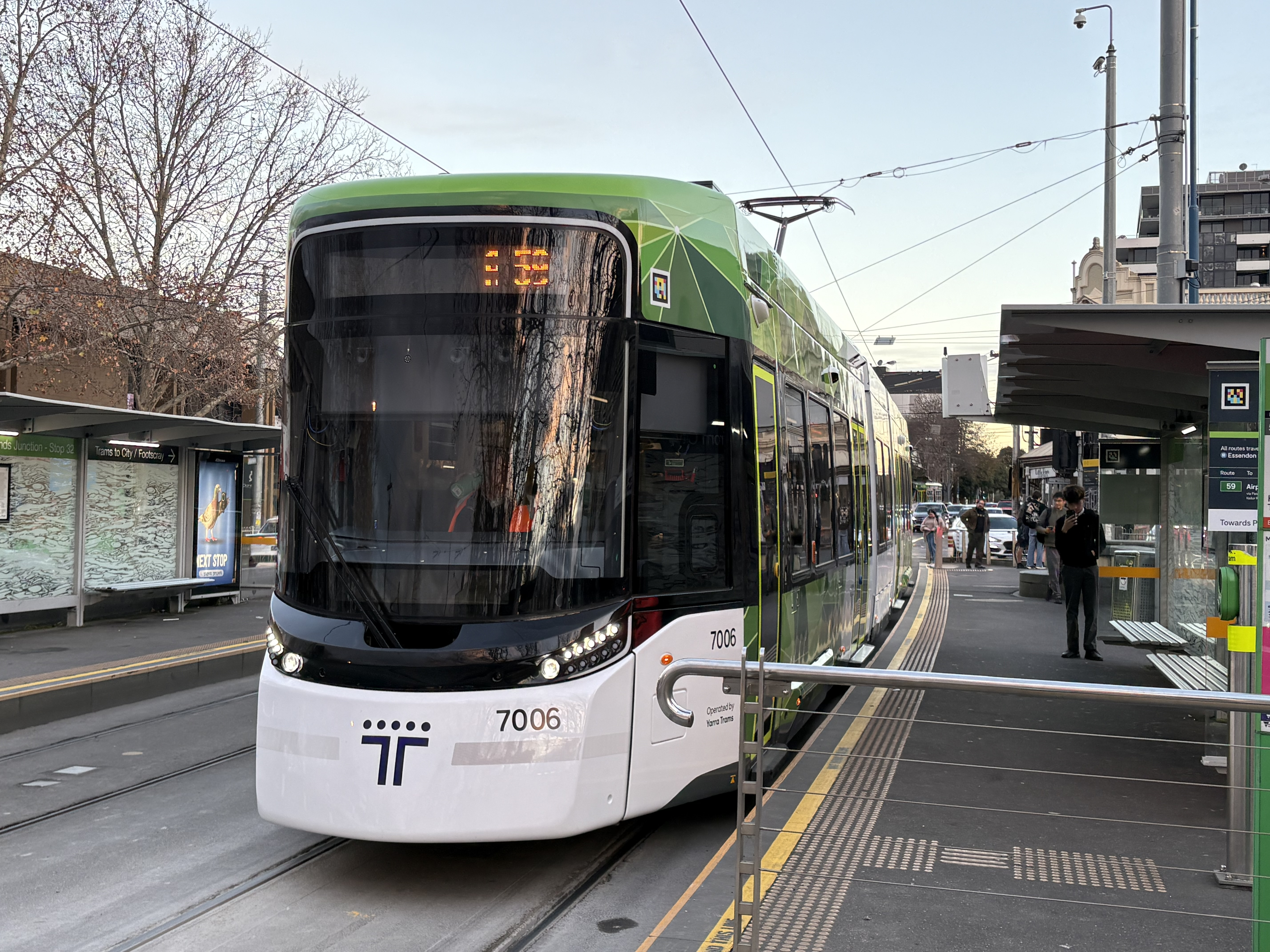
A G class at Moonee Ponds Junction on a Route 59 service to Airport West
