= Melbourne tram route 57 =

Tram route in metropolitan Melbourne, Victoria, Australia

Route 57

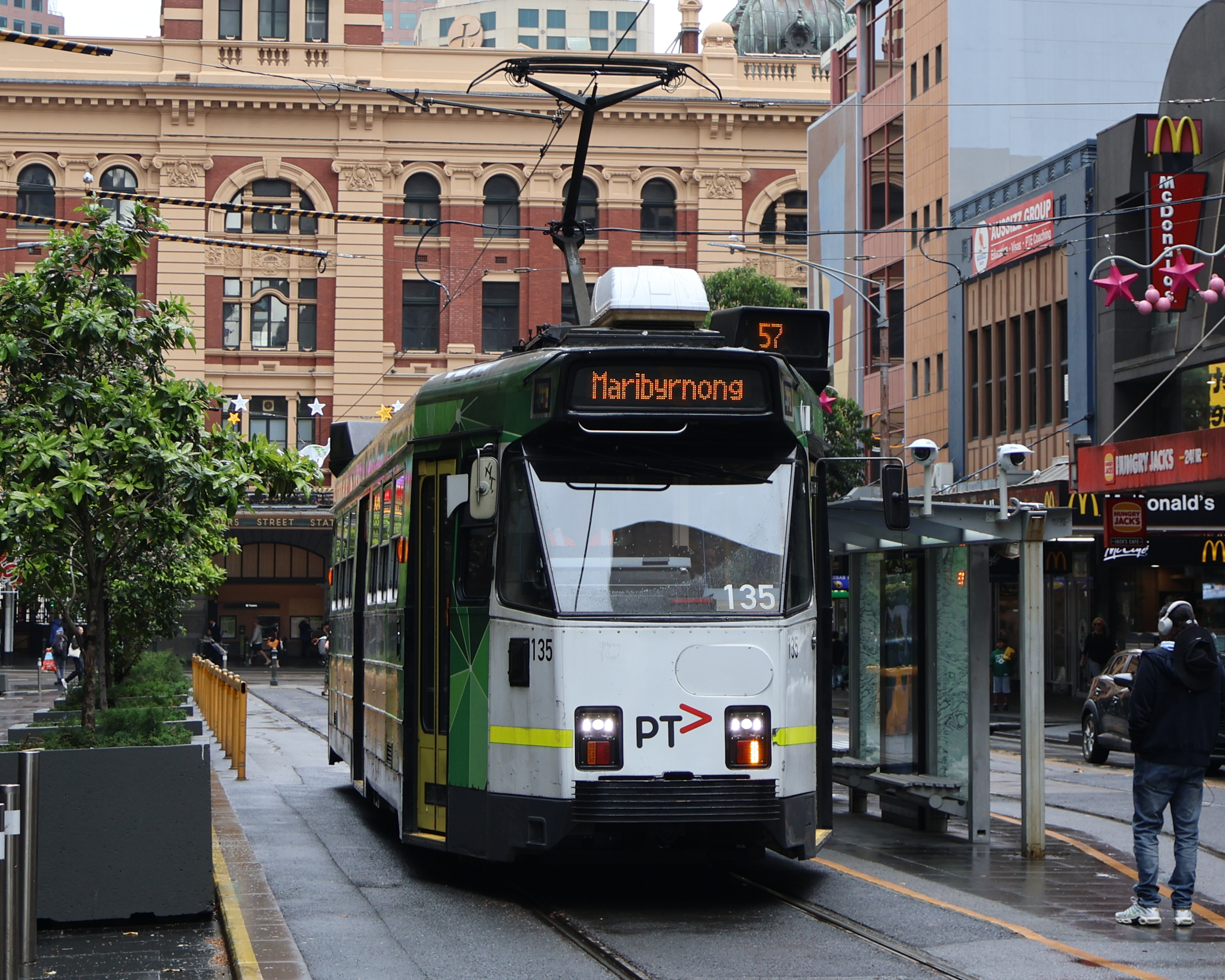
- Z class tram at the Flinders Street station terminus, December 2025

Overview
- System: Melbourne tramway network
- Operator: Yarra Trams
- Depot: Essendon
- Vehicle: Z class
- Began service: 22 December 1940

Route
- Start: West Maribyrnong
- Via: Moonee Ponds; Ascot Vale; Flemington; Kensington; North Melbourne; Elizabeth Street
- End: Flinders Street station
- Length: 11.6 kilometres
- Timetable: Route 57 timetable
- Map: Route 57 map

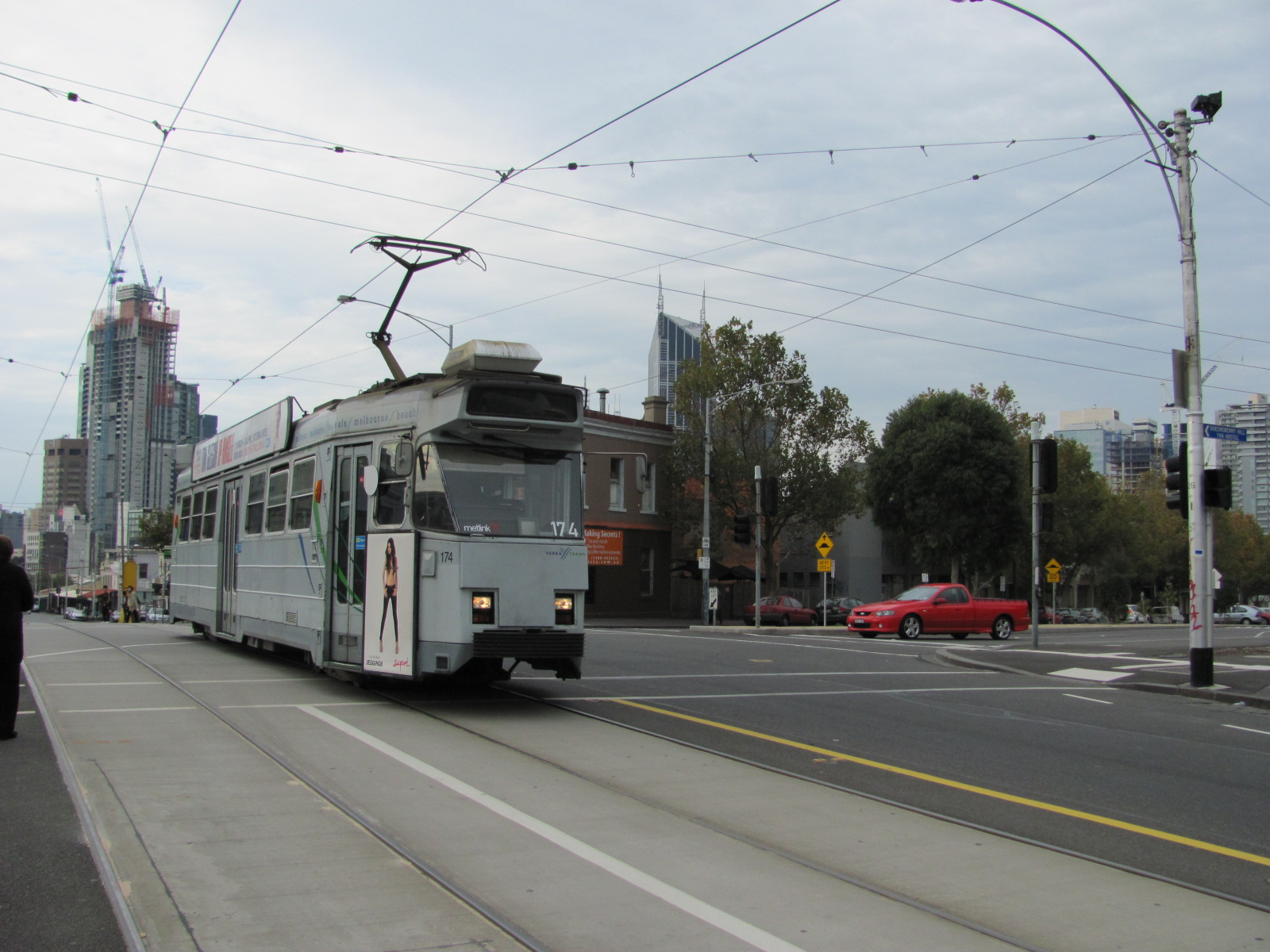
Z class tram on Victoria Street, May 2011

Melbourne tram route 57 is operated by Yarra Trams on the Melbourne tram network from West Maribyrnong to Flinders Street station. The 11.6-kilometre route is operated out of Essendon depot with Z-class trams.

== History ==
Route 57 was first allocated to the line between West Maribyrnong and the City via North Melbourne on 22 December 1940 when the Maribyrnong line was extended from the Maribyrnong River to West Maribyrnong. Prior to that, the number was officially listed for the Ballarat Road line on the Footscray system, but was never used in practice since the single-truck trams used on that line didn't have route number boxes. Before the West Maribyrnong extension, services on the Maribyrnong line were provided by Route 54, which ran from the Maribyrnong River terminus to the City via North Melbourne. Trams would terminate in William Street prior to the conversion of the Elizabeth Street line in 1935. On 12 November 1961 trams on Sunday were replaced on route 57 by buses. Sunday trams were reinstated on 8 August 1993.

The origins of Route 57 lie in separate lines. The section between Flinders Street (Stop 1) and Victoria Street (Stop 7) is the oldest section of track, dating back to the Brunswick cable tram line, which opened on 1 October 1887. This section was converted to electric traction on 17 November 1935. The section between Flemington Bridge station (near Stop 22) and Victoria Street dates back to the North Melbourne cable tram line, which opened on 3 March 1890, and was fully electrified on 24 September 1935. The section between the Maribyrnong River (near Stop 41) and Flemington Bridge was constructed by the North Melbourne Electric Tramway & Lighting Company as part of its original electric tramway system on 11 October 1906. The section from the Maribyrnong River to West Maribyrnong was opened by the Melbourne & Metropolitan Tramways Board on 22 December 1940. In 2000, the West Maribyrnong terminus was concreted with the former munitions siding removed.

=== Proposed extensions ===
There have been proposals, supported by the Public Transport Users Association and local politicians, to extend route 57 north-west along Milleara Road to Avondale Heights and Keilor East. Variations of this proposal include building a park-and-ride facility near the terminus, or establishing a high-frequency bus service between the terminus and Keilor East down Milleara Road.

The State Government in 2009 also proposed the tram be extended into the new suburb planned for the former Maribyrnong Defence Site. The tram would head north from its current terminus into the heart of the new suburb.

Melbourne tram route 57 evolution
Dates	Route	Notes
c. 1934 – 21 December 1940	Ballarat Road to Williamstown Road	Never used as single-truck trams on the line had no number plates
22 December 1940 – present	West Maribyrnong to City (Elizabeth Street)	via North Melbourne

== Route ==
Interactive map of Melbourne tram route 57.

The route runs from the corner of Cordite and Central Park Avenues adjacent to the Defence Explosive Factory, West Maribyrnong via Moonee Ponds, Ascot Vale, Flemington, Kensington and North Melbourne before proceeding along Elizabeth Street to terminate outside Flinders Street station.

Route 57 shares track with route 82 between the intersection of Raleigh and Wests Roads, Maribyrnong and Maribyrnong and Union Roads, Ascot Vale. A loop siding exists at the south end of Union Road in Ascot Vale and is used during special events at the Melbourne Showgrounds and Flemington Racecourse to handle the additional trams used to move the crowds of passengers.

== Operation ==
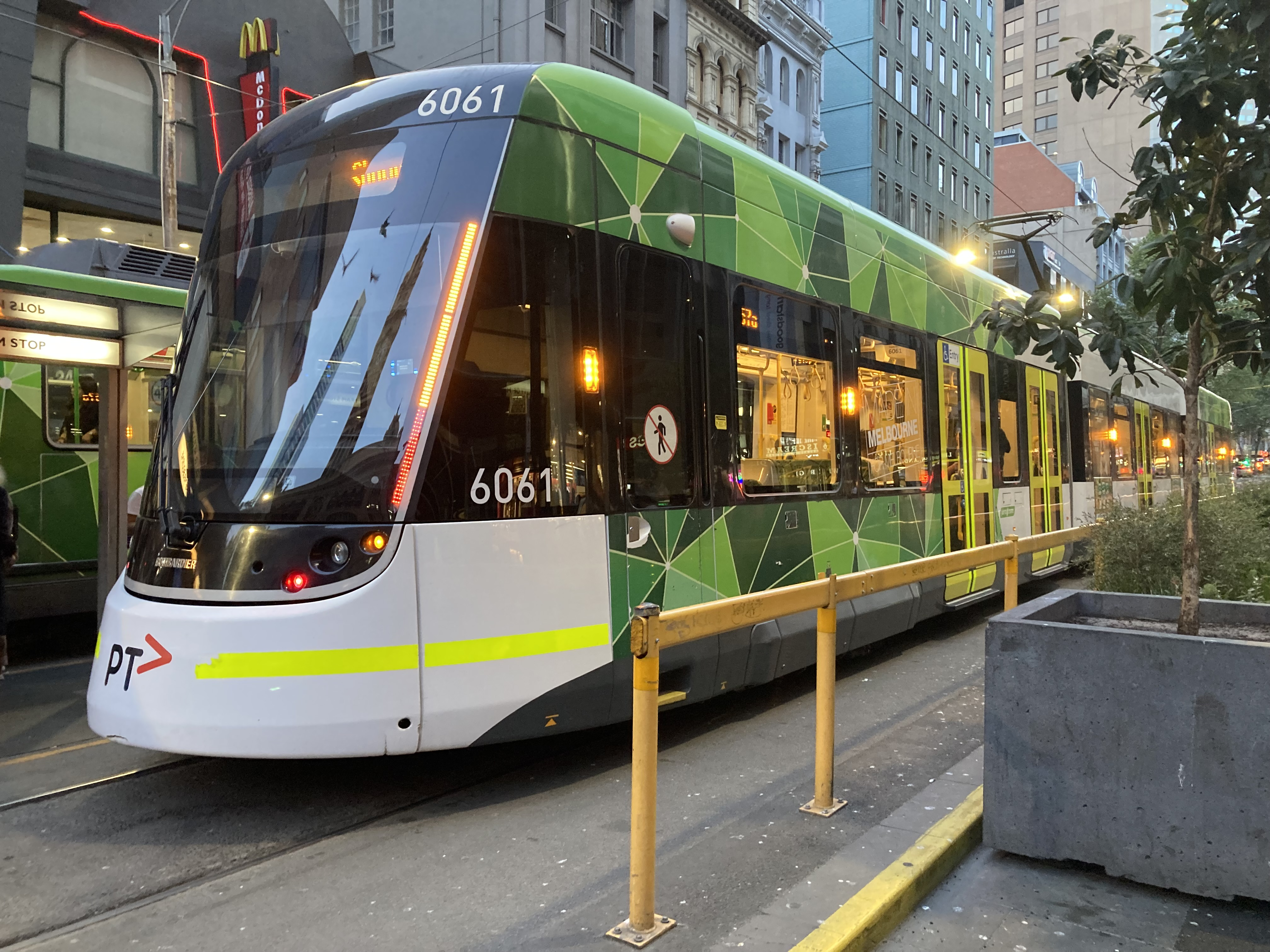
E class tram on shuttle route 57a at the Flinders Street terminus, September 2023

Routes 57 is operated out of Essendon depot with Z-class trams.

During special events at the Melbourne Showgrounds such as the Melbourne Royal Show, E-class trams operate on the route 57a shuttle between the Flinders Street terminus and the Showgrounds.

== In popular culture ==
The tram makes numerous appearances in the establishing shots for the show Fisk where it travels past the law firm of Gruber & Gruber where the main character, Helen Tudor-Fisk, works.
