= Moonee Ponds Junction tram stop =

Tram and bus interchange in Melbourne, Australia

Moonee Ponds Junction
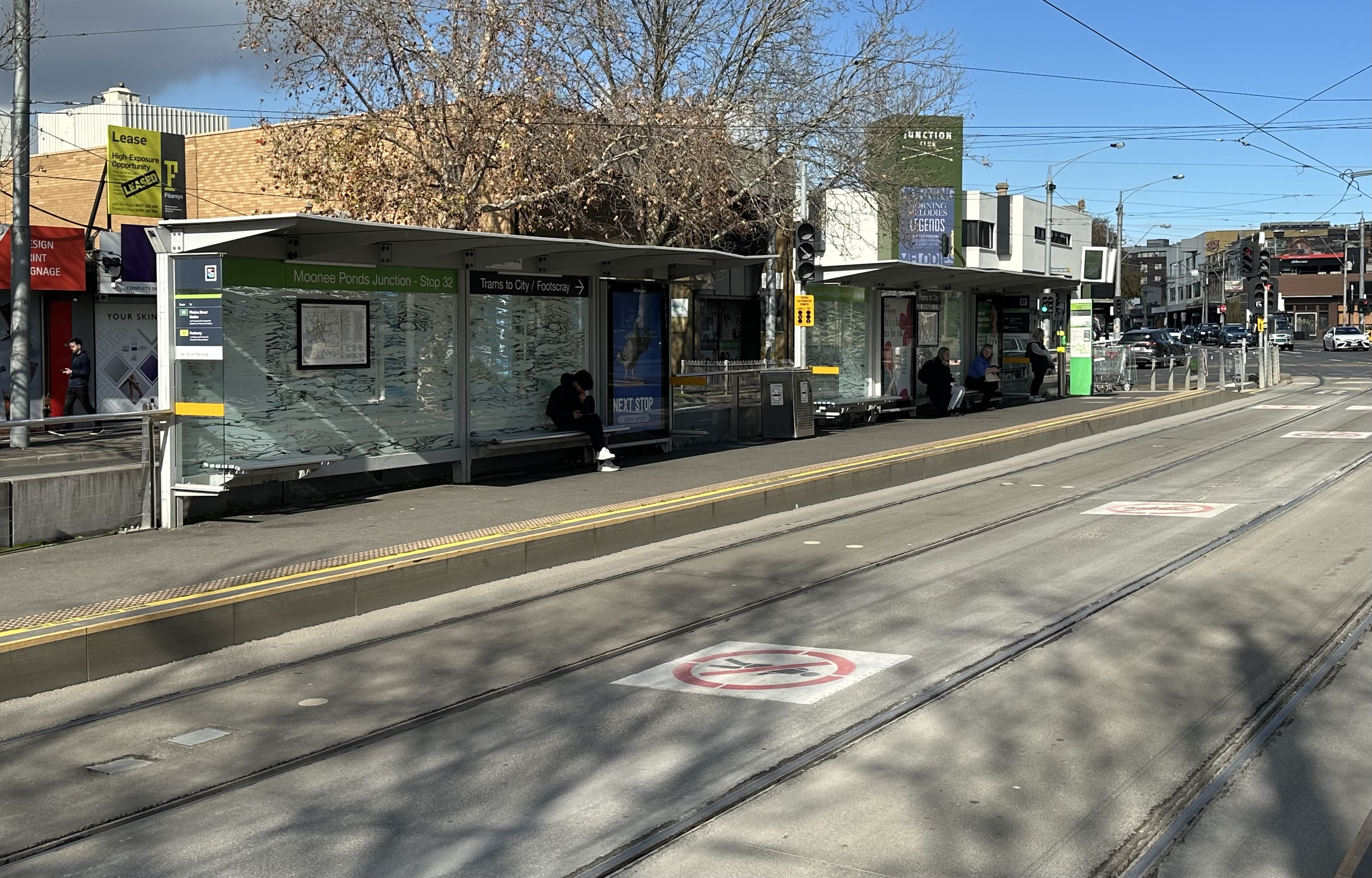
- Southbound tram stop in July 2026

General information
- Location: Corner Ascot Vale, Mount Alexander & Pascoe Vale Roads, Moonee Ponds; Australia
- Coordinates: 37.76715°S 144.92488°E
- System: PTV tram stop
- Owner: VicTrack
- Platforms: 2 (2 side)
- Tracks: 2
- Tram operators: Yarra Trams
- Bus stands: 9
- Bus operators: CDC Melbourne; Kinetic Melbourne; Transit Systems
- Connections: Bus

Construction
- Structure type: At grade
- Accessible: Yes

Other information
- Status: Operational
- Station code: 32
- Fare zone: Myki zone 1

History
- Rebuilt: January 2016
- Electrified: 600 V DC overhead
Services
Preceding station	Yarra Trams	Following station
Moonee Valley Civic Centre towards Airport West	Route 59	Montgomery Street towards Flinders Street Station
Terminus	Route 82	Chaucer Street towards Footscray
Location

Moonee Ponds Junction is a bus and tram interchange on the junction of Ascot Vale Road / Pascoe Vale Road and Mount Alexander Road in Moonee Ponds, Melbourne (Puckle Street / Dean Street also meets at the same point). It is located approximately 400 metres east of Moonee Ponds station. In June 2015, Yarra Trams revealed plans to build a covered tram stop. The work was completed in January 2016.

== Trams ==
It is served by Yarra Trams routes 59 and 82. Previously route 82 trams terminated at a separate platform south of the existing pair in the middle of the Ascot Vale Road. As part of the January 2016 rebuild, a headshunt was built to the north of the main platforms with route 82 now terminating at the main platform.

== Buses ==
Moonee Ponds Junction has nine bus stands that are served by CDC Melbourne, Kinetic and Transit Systems. Prior to July 2025, Dysons and Kastoria Bus Lines operated routes out of the interchange.

Bay 1:

- 404: Footscray via Newmarket

Bay 2:

- 472:Williamstown via Footscray

Bay 3:

- 504: Clifton Hill station via Brunswick East
- 505: University of Melbourne via Parkville Gardens

Bay 4:

- 506: Westgarth station via Brunswick

Bay 5:

- 508: Alphington via Brunswick and Northcote

Bay 6:

- 476: Watergardens station via Keilor

Bay 7:

- 469: Keilor East via Strathmore

Bay 8:

- 477: Broadmeadows station via Essendon, Airport West and Gladstone Park

Bay 9:

- 483: Sunbury via Diggers Rest
