= Flemington Bridge railway station =

Railway station in Melbourne, Australia

Flemington Bridge
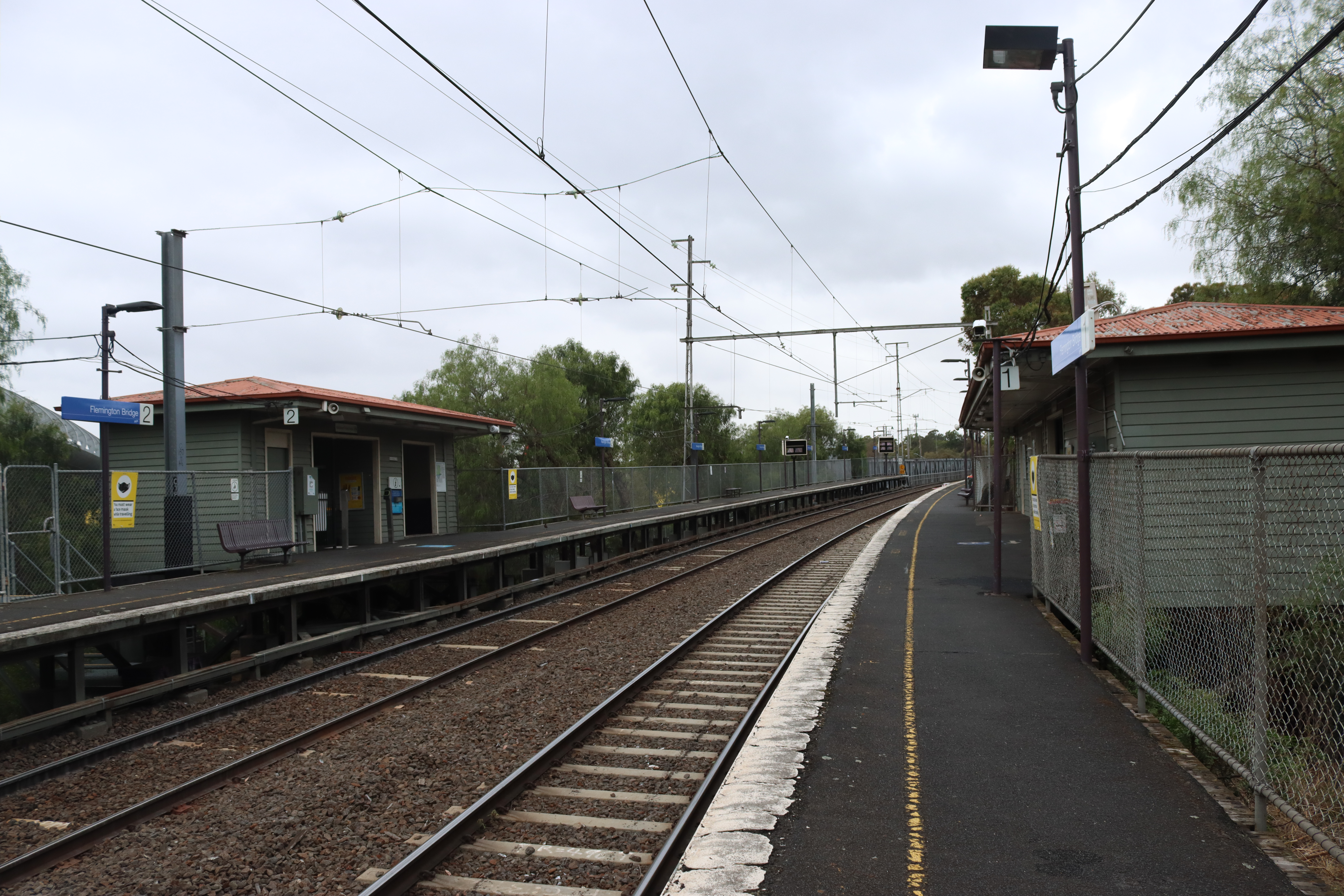
- Northbound view from Platform 1, December 2021

General information
- Location: Boundary Road, North Melbourne, Victoria 3051; City of Melbourne; City of Moonee Valley; Australia
- Coordinates: 37°47′18″S 144°56′22″E
- System: PTV commuter rail station
- Owner: VicTrack
- Operator: Metro Trains
- Line: Upfield
- Distance: 4.06 kilometres from Southern Cross
- Platforms: 2 side
- Tracks: 2
- Connections: Bus; Tram

Construction
- Structure type: Elevated
- Accessible: No (steep ramp)

Other information
- Status: Operational, unstaffed
- Station code: FBD
- Fare zone: Myki zone 1
- Website: Public Transport Victoria

History
- Opened: 10 April 1885; 141 years ago
- Electrified: December 1920 (1500 V DC overhead)
- Former names: Flemington (1885)

Passengers
- 2005–2006: 109,888
- 2006–2007: 129,246 ▲17.61%
- 2007–2008: 140,339 ▲8.58%
- 2008–2009: 164,718 ▲17.37%
- 2009–2010: 176,879 ▲7.38%
- 2010–2011: 194,221 ▲9.8%
- 2011–2012: 209,958 ▲8.1%
- 2012–2013: Not measured
- 2013–2014: 227,614 ▲8.41%
- 2014–2015: 240,218 ▲5.53%
- 2015–2016: 254,264 ▲5.84%
- 2016–2017: 290,732 ▲14.34%
- 2017–2018: 280,952 ▼3.36%
- 2018–2019: 286,650 ▲2.03%
- 2019–2020: 225,150 ▼21.45%
- 2020–2021: 94,250 ▼58.1%
- 2021–2022: 123,300 ▲30.82%
- 2022–2023: 184,050 ▲47.27%
- 2023–2024: 252,700 ▲37.3%
- 2024–2025: 273,600 ▲8.27%

Services
| Preceding station | Metro Trains | Following station |
|---|---|---|
| Macaulay towards Flinders Street | Upfield line | Royal Park towards Upfield |
Track layout
Location

Flemington Bridge station is a railway station operated by Metro Trains Melbourne on the Upfield line, part of the Melbourne rail network. It serves the inner-northern suburb of Flemington, in Melbourne, Victoria, Australia. It opened on 10 April 1885. Initially, the station was called Flemington, and was given its current name on 3 December 1885.

The station is located on an embankment between the Mount Alexander Road and Racecourse Road rail overpasses. An overpass on the CityLink tollway is a short distance west of the station.

== History ==
The station opened seven months after the railway line from North Melbourne was extended to Coburg, and was named after the bridge on nearby Flemington Road that crosses the Moonee Ponds Creek. Originally built in 1851, to improve the connection for gold prospectors travelling to the Bendigo goldfields, the bridge was named Mains Bridge, after James Patrick Mains, a well-known contractor. It was renamed Flemington Road Bridge, before being shortened to Flemington Bridge.

In 1886, permanent station buildings were erected at the station, with timber stairs leading to Boundary and Mount Alexander Roads.

In 1891, the Parliamentary Standing Committee on Railways recommended the construction of a spur line from Flemington Bridge to Pascoe Vale, to relieve crowding on the Essendon line at peak times, as well as providing a shorter alternative route to the city, following the route of what is now CityLink. The committee estimated the single track line would cost £93,000 to build, but recommended that only £30,000 be spent, with the remainder to be made up by donated land. However, the proposal was not taken up by government.

In 1944, the current station buildings, with asbestos cement roofs, were provided and, at the same time, the stairs were replaced by asphalted ramps.

In 1997, to allow construction of an elevated section of CityLink between Flemington Bridge and North Melbourne the Upfield Line was announced to be closed between North Melbourne and Flemington Bridge for 6 months. The closure was announced in February 1997. On 7 April 1997, a'facing' crossover was installed on the opposite side of the Mount Alexander Road bridge which would allow trains from Upfield to terminate and return at Flemington Bridge.

The Upfield Line was closed between North Melbourne and Flemington Bridge on 1 May 1997, despite promises from the Kennett government that the Upfield Line would remain open during CityLink construction. The closure was originally supposed to end on 31 October 1997, but due to delays with construction, the date of reopening was pushed back into 1998.

The Upfield Line between North Melbourne and Flemington Bridge was reopened after several months of delay on 23 February 1998 after the completion of bridge works for CityLink. To advertise the opening, travel along the Upfield Line was made free of charge for one month.

== Platforms and services ==
Flemington Bridge has two side platforms and is served by Upfield line trains.

Flemington Bridge platform arrangement
| Platform | Line | Destination | Via | Service Type | Notes | Source |
|---|---|---|---|---|---|---|
| 1 | Upfield line | Flinders Street | City Loop | All stations | See City Loop for operating patterns | |
| 2 | Upfield line | Upfield | | All stations | | |

== Transport links ==
Ventura Bus Lines operates one route via Flemington Bridge station, under contract to Public Transport Victoria:

- Night Bus 959 : Melbourne CBD (Queen Street) – Broadmeadows station (Saturday and Sunday mornings only)

Yarra Trams operates two routes via Flemington Bridge station:

- : West Maribyrnong – Flinders Street station (via Elizabeth Street)
- : Airport West – Flinders Street station (via Elizabeth Street)
