= Flemington Road =

Road in Melbourne, Victoria

Coordinates: 37°47′40″S 144°56′54″E

Flemington Road Victoria
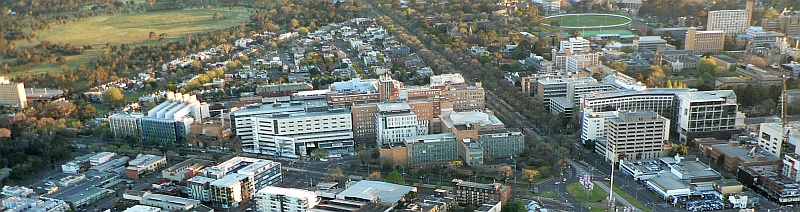
- Aerial view of the southeastern portion of Flemington Road (running from left to right) in 2010, prior to the construction of the Victorian Comprehensive Cancer Centre in the far southeast (bottom right). Click to enlarge.

General information
- Type: Road
- Length: 2.1 km (1.3 mi)
- Route number(s): Metro Route 60 (2013–present) (CityLink–Harker Street)
- Former route number: National Route 79 (1988–2013) (CityLink–Harker Street); Alt. National Route 1 (1978–1988); National Route 1 (1955–1978); National Highway 8 (1974–2009); National Route 8 (1955–1974) (Racecourse Road–Harker Street)

Major junctions
- Northwest end: Mount Alexander Road; Parkville, Melbourne
- CityLink; Racecourse Road; Elliott Avenue; Harker Street; Peel Street
- Southeast end: Elizabeth Street; Melbourne CBD

Location(s)
- LGA(s): City of Melbourne
- Major suburbs: North Melbourne, Parkville

Flemington Road is a major thoroughfare in the inner suburbs of North Melbourne and Parkville in Melbourne, Victoria, Australia. It runs for 2 km in a northwest–southeast direction, from the southern end of Mount Alexander Road, Flemington, to Haymarket roundabout and the northern end of Elizabeth Street, and provides a main connection between the northern arm of the CityLink tollway and Melbourne's CBD.

== Route ==
Flemington Road starts at the intersection of Boundary Road and the southbound ramp from CityLink and heads south-east as an eight-lane wide dual-carriageway, with a dedicated tram median down the centre; after passing the intersection with Racecourse Road and Elliot Avenue, the carriageways divide further to form a four-lane central carriageway with dedicated tram median, flanked by two-lane, one-way carriageways in each direction servicing properties and side-streets. The road passes the Royal Children's Hospital and then the Royal Melbourne and Royal Women's Hospitals, before ending at the large Haymarket roundabout.

== History ==
The road was signed National Route 79 in 1955, continuing south-east from Mount Alexander Road (and then from Tullamarine Freeway from 1972); National Routes 1 and 8 joined from Racecourse Road, all three continuing south-east until the intersection with Harker Street, where National Routes 8 and 79 terminated and National Route 1 continued south down Harker Street. National Route 8 was upgraded to National Highway 8 when the Western Highway was declared a National Highway in 1974; National Route 1 was re-routed to use the West Gate Freeway when it opened in 1978 and its former allocation was replaced with Alternative National Route 1, itself later removed in 1988. National Highway 8 was removed when the Deer Park bypass opened in 2009, and National Route 79 was replaced by Metropolitan Route 60 in 2013.

The passing of the Road Management Act 2004 granted the responsibility of overall management and development of Victoria's major arterial roads to VicRoads: in 2004, VicRoads re-declared the road as Flemington Road (Arterial #5044), beginning at Boundary Road at Parkville and ending at Peel Street in the Melbourne CBD.

== Facilities ==
The road provides access to several notable medicine and medical research institutions, as well as other facilities, particularly in the southeastern portion. It is a major healthcare precinct, containing many of inner Melbourne's hospitals. Some of these facilities are listed below, from north-westernmost to south-easternmost:

- Royal Park
- Royal Children's Hospital
- University of Melbourne Western Precinct

- Building 400 (Veterinary Preclinical Sciences)
- Bio21 Institute

- Royal Women's Hospital
- Frances Perry Private Hospital
- Royal Melbourne Hospital
- Victorian Comprehensive Cancer Centre

- Peter MacCallum Cancer Centre

== Transport ==
Flemington Road consists of four motor vehicle lanes, two in each direction, and two tram tracks, one in each direction. These tracks are within 'Zone 1' and are serviced by Yarra Trams route numbers 57, 58, and 59. The extreme north-west of Flemington Road is adjacent to Flemington Bridge railway station, which is on the Upfield railway line.

== Major intersections ==
Flemington Road is entirely contained within the City of Melbourne local government area.

Location	km	mi	Destinations	Notes
Parkville–North Melbourne boundary	0.0	0.0	Mount Alexander Road – Moonee Ponds, Essendon	Northwestern terminus of road and Metro Route 60, continues northeast as Mount Alexander Road
Parkville–North Melbourne boundary	0.0	0.0	CityLink (M2 north) – Tullamarine, Melbourne Airport; Boundary Road (south) – West Melbourne	No access to CityLink: one way southbound No right turn from Boundary Road northbound into Flemington Road
Parkville–North Melbourne boundary	0.3	0.19	Racecourse Road (Metro Route 83 west) – Footscray, Laverton North; Elliot Avenue (Metro Route 83 east) – Clifton Hill	No right turn from Flemington Road north-westbound into Elliot Avenue, south-eastbound into Racecourse Road
Parkville–North Melbourne boundary	0.9	0.56	Abbotsford Street – North Melbourne	No right turn from Abbotsford Street northbound into Flemington Road
Parkville–North Melbourne boundary	1.4	0.87	Harker Street (Metro Route 60 southwest) – Southbank, St Kilda, Dandenong; Gatehouse Street (northeast) – Parkville	Metro Route 60 continues southwest along Harker Street
Parkville–North Melbourne boundary	1.8	1.1	Wreckyn Street (southwest) – North Melbourne; Grattan Street (east) – Carlton	
Parkville–North Melbourne boundary	2.0	1.2	Peel Street (Metro Route 55 south) – Docklands	Southbound entrance via Haymarket roundabout
Parkville–North Melbourne boundary	2.1	1.3	Elizabeth Street (Metro Route 55 north, no shield southeast) – Brunswick, Coburg, City	Southeastern terminus of road, continues southeast beyond Haymarket roundabout as Elizabeth Street
Incomplete access; Route transition
