= University of Melbourne Faculty of Veterinary and Agricultural Sciences =

Agricultural Faculty of the University of Melbourne

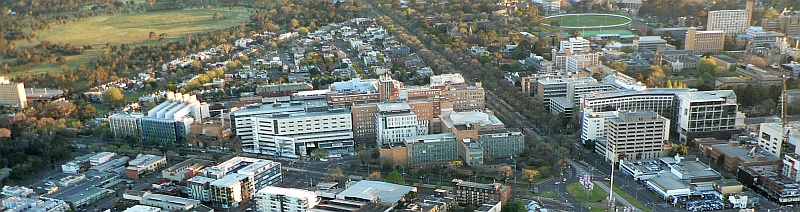
Aerial view of part of Parkville in 2010. Building 400 (Veterinary Preclinical Sciences) is visible as the brown building with vertical white stripes on the far-left of the triangle-shaped city block. (Click to enlarge)

The Faculty of Veterinary and Agricultural Sciences (FVAS) was a faculty of the University of Melbourne until it was disestablished on 1 January 2023. The two schools merged into the Faculty of Science. The faculty was a medium sized faculty for undergraduate education and academic research into economically and medically important fields related to agriculture and veterinary science, such as agronomy, biosecurity, environment, food security, food science, parasitology, pest control, veterinary virology, zoonotic diseases, etc.

== Organisation ==
The faculty was structured as follows while noting that all three leaders have left the University:

- Faculty of Veterinary and Agricultural Sciences – Dean: Prof. John Fazakerley

- Melbourne Veterinary School – Head of school: Prof. Anna Louise Meredith OBE FRCVS

Research centres: Animal Welfare Science Centre, Asia-Pacific Centre for Animal Health, Centre for Animal Biotechnology, Centre for Equine Infectious Disease, Mackinnon Project, OIE Collaborating Centre for Diagnostic Test Validation Science in the Asia-Pacific Region, Poultry CRC

- School of Agriculture and Food – Head of school: Prof. Herbert Kronzucker

Research centres: Healthy Soils for Sustainable Food Production and Environmental Quality, Primary Industries Climate Challenges Centre, Unlocking the Food Value Chain

=== History of organisation ===
The Faculty of Veterinary and Agricultural Sciences was disestablished on 1 January 2023. The Melbourne School of Land and Environment was disestablished on 1 January 2015. Its agriculture and food systems department moved alongside veterinary science to form the Faculty of Veterinary and Agricultural Sciences, while other areas of study, including horticulture, forestry, geography and resource management, moved to the Faculty of Science in two new departments. Previous constituent entities include the Faculty of Agriculture, Forestry and Horticulture (1995), Institute of Land and Food Resources (1997), Faculty of Land & Food Resources (2005) and School of Agriculture and Food Systems (in the Melbourne School of Land and Environment).

== Facilities ==
Locations of the two settlements within Victoria in which FVAS is represented

The faculty operated through the following facilities:

- Building 122 (a.k.a. Biosciences 2; Agriculture and Food), on Royal Parade, at the far-western edge of the Parkville campus, Melbourne – Faculty administration, study areas for students
- Building 400 (Veterinary Preclinical Sciences), on Flemington Road, part of the Western Precinct, an exclave of Parkville campus, together with the Bio21 Institute and the Walter and Eliza Hall Institute of Medical Research – Research
- Building 438 (Werribee Demountable Consult), Werribee campus, Melbourne – A veterinary hospital and the Veterinary Science Library Werribee are located here. The latter generally collects in the areas of surgery, pathology and parasitology. Services offered at the library include borrowing, membership, renewals, inter-library loans, inter-campus loans, BONUS+ borrowing scheme, and printing and scanning.
- The Dookie campus

== Student engagement ==
=== Courses ===
The faculty offered the following courses:

Agricultural science

- Bachelor of Agriculture*
- Bachelor of Agriculture (Honours)
- Honours in Agricultural Science (Bachelor of Science)
- Honours in Animal Science and Management (Bachelor of Science)
- Graduate Certificate in Agricultural Sciences
- Graduate Certificate in Climate Change for Primary Industries
- Graduate Diploma in Agricultural Sciences
- Master of Agricultural Sciences
- Master of Philosophy
- Doctor of Philosophy (Agricultural Sciences)

Veterinary science

- Honours in Veterinary Bioscience (Bachelor of Science)
- Graduate Certificate in Small Animal Emergency and Critical Care
- Graduate Certificate in Small Animal Ultrasound (Abdominal)
- Graduate Certificate in Veterinary Public Health
- Graduate Diploma in Agribusiness for Veterinarians
- Graduate Diploma in Veterinary Professional Leadership and Management
- Graduate Diploma in Veterinary Public Health
- Clinical Masters Residency Program
- Master of Philosophy (Veterinary Science)
- Master of Veterinary Public Health
- Master of Veterinary Science
- Master of Veterinary Studies
- Doctor of Philosophy (Veterinary Science)
- Doctor of Veterinary Medicine*

Food science

- Honours in Food Science (Bachelor of Science)
- Graduate Certificate in Food Science
- Graduate Diploma in Food Science
- Master of Food and Packaging Innovation
- Master of Food Science

General studies

- Diploma in General Studies

(*) The faculty required all students undertaking at least these courses to be vaccinated for the zoonotic bacterium Coxiella burnetii, the causal agent of Q fever.

=== Societies ===
Several student societies existed to foster cohesion among students in the faculty:

- Agricultural and Food Sciences Society
- Veterinary Students Society of Victoria
- Graduate student association

- Agrifoodies
- Animal Welfare Science Students of The UoM
- Postgraduates at Werribee (PAWS)
- Postgraduates of Veterinary Science (POVS)

== Rankings ==
The Academic Ranking of World Universities (ARWU) has produced and annual rank, since 2017, of universities according to subject area in the Global Ranking of Academic Subjects. The table below summarises the rankings of the University of Melbourne in the subjects of 'Agriculture' and 'Veterinary Sciences', in comparison to all universities and Australian universities only. Since 2018, the University of Melbourne Department of Veterinary Biosciences has ranked second in Australia in Veterinary Sciences, behind the University of Sydney School of Veterinary Science.

ARWU Global Ranking of Academic Subjects
Subject	Geographic scope	2017 ranking	2018 ranking	2019 ranking	2020 ranking	2021 ranking
Agriculture	World	47	▲40	▼43	▲30	▼32
Agriculture	Australia	6	▲5	5	▲3	3
Veterinary Sciences	World	39	▲32	▲27	▲26	▲21
Veterinary Sciences	Australia	3	▲2	2	2	2

== See also ==
- Related topics

- Agriculture in Australia
- Agricultural education (list of providers)
- Veterinary education (list of providers)

- Related faculties of the University of Melbourne

- University of Melbourne Faculty of Science
- University of Melbourne Faculty of Medicine, Dentistry and Health Sciences

- Pre-2015 University of Melbourne veterinary and agricultural academics

- Arthur William Turner OBE DVSc DSc FAA (1900–1989)
- Harold Addison Woodruff (1877–1966)
- Nancy Atkinson OBE (1910–1999)
