= Frances Perry =

Frances Perry may refer to:

- Frances Perry (gardener) (1907–1993), English gardener, administrator and writer
- Frances Perry (philanthropist) (1814–1892), English philanthropist
  - Frances Perry Private Hospital
