= Haymarket roundabout =

Roundabout in the Melbourne central business district

Coordinates: 37.8011°S 144.9573°E

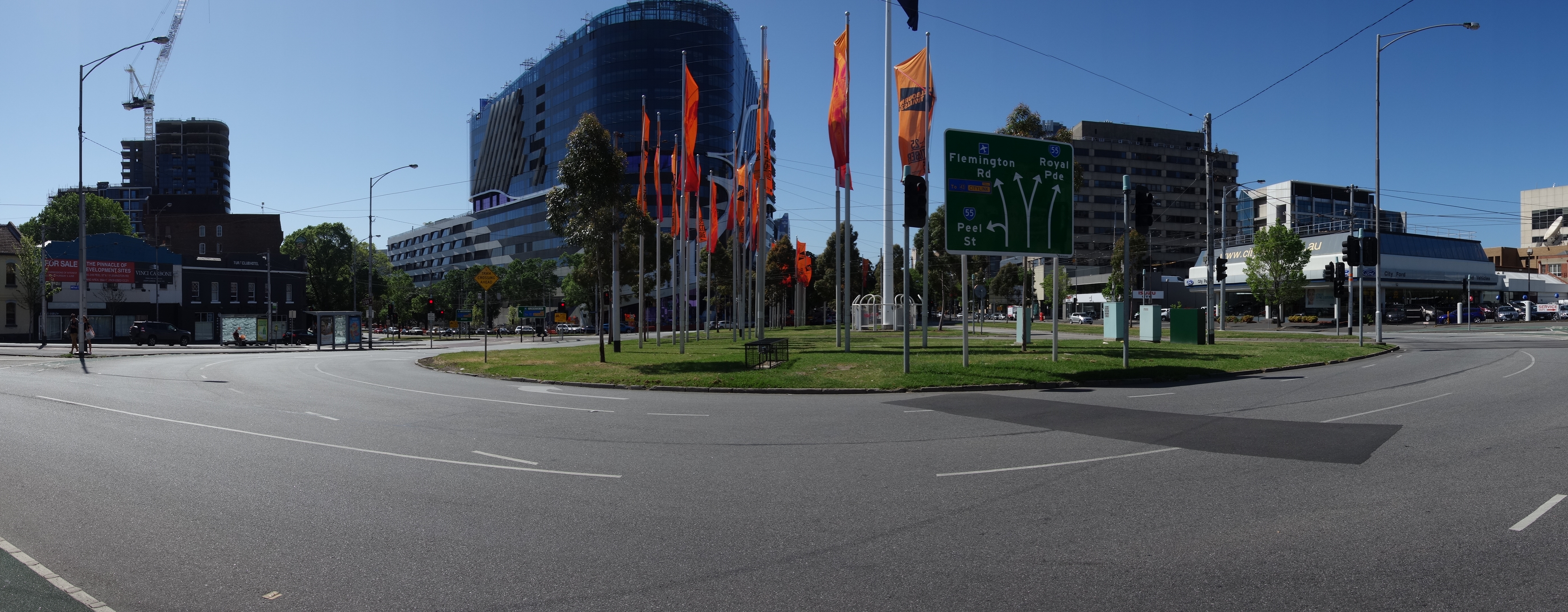
Haymarket roundabout

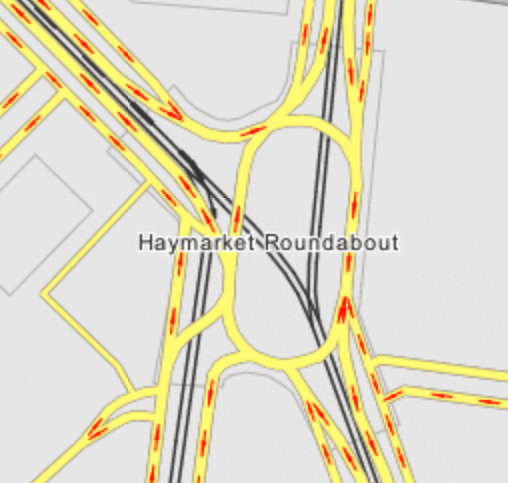
Map of roundabout

Haymarket roundabout is a roundabout located at the intersection of Elizabeth Street, Flemington Road and Peel Street near the northwest border of the Melbourne central business district in Australia. It is also the location of two tram stops. Royal Parade appears to begin at the roundabout. However, the block north of the roundabout, as far as Grattan Street, is formally still Elizabeth Street.

The roundabout used to be known informally known as the roundabout of death due to the high number of serious traffic incidents. Between 2000 and May 2011 there were 78 crashes recorded at the roundabout, including 14 with serious injuries. This has improved since the installation of traffic lights and pedestrian crossings at all entries in 2011. A November 2019 crash history check via the VicRoads crash statistics portal shows just 12 crashes during the previous five years. Despite improvements, continuing deficiencies with this roundabout include:

- A lack of adequate advance signage on Flemington Road and Royal Parade directing drivers into the appropriate entry lanes for their desired destinations.
- A lack of signage for northbound cyclists about the intended northbound Elizabeth Street cyclist movement – left turn into Flemington Road followed by a hook turn to the right in front of Peel Street traffic. (This works well but is not intuitive and is missed by many cyclists).
- As a pedestrian, getting from one side to the other can be very time-consuming, due to having to wait a complete cycle of the traffic lights between crossing each leg.

== Tram stops ==
Pelham Street Flemington Road

General information
- Location: Elizabeth and Peel Streets, Melbourne; Victoria; Australia
- System: PTV tram stops
- Owner: VicTrack
- Operator: Yarra Trams
- Platforms: 4 (2 side each on Elizabeth and Peel Streets)
- Tracks: 4 (2 each on Elizabeth and Peel Streets)
- Connections: Bus route 505

Construction
- Structure type: At grade
- Accessible: Yes on Elizabeth Street, no on Peel Street

Other information
- Station code: Pelham St/Elizabeth St: 9 Flemington Rd/Peel St: 12
- Fare zone: Myki Zone 1

History
- Electrified: 600 V DC overhead
Location

The Haymarket tram stops refer to two tram stops located next to the Haymarket roundabout, one on Elizabeth Street southeast of the roundabout, and one on Peel Street south of the roundabout. They are named: Pelham Street/Elizabeth Street and Flemington Road/Peel Street respectively.

=== Services ===
| Nº | Destination | via | Located on |
|---|---|---|---|
| 19 (Note: Operates overnight on Saturday and Sunday mornings.) | Coburg North | Parkville – Brunswick | Elizabeth Street |
| 19 | Flinders Street railway station, City | | Elizabeth Street |
| 58 | Pascoe Vale South | Parkville – Brunswick West | Peel Street |
| 58 | Toorak | City – Southbank – South Yarra | Peel Street |
| 59 | Airport West | Parkville – Travancore – Moonee Ponds – Essendon | Elizabeth Street |
| 59 | Flinders Street railway station, City | | Elizabeth Street |
