= Anna Meredith (disambiguation) =

Anna Meredith may refer to

- Anna Meredith (born 1978), Scottish composer
- Anna Meredith (veterinary surgeon)

== See also ==
- Anne Meredith Barry, Canadian artist
