= Elizabeth Street, Melbourne =

Road in Melbourne, Victoria

Elizabeth Street Victoria
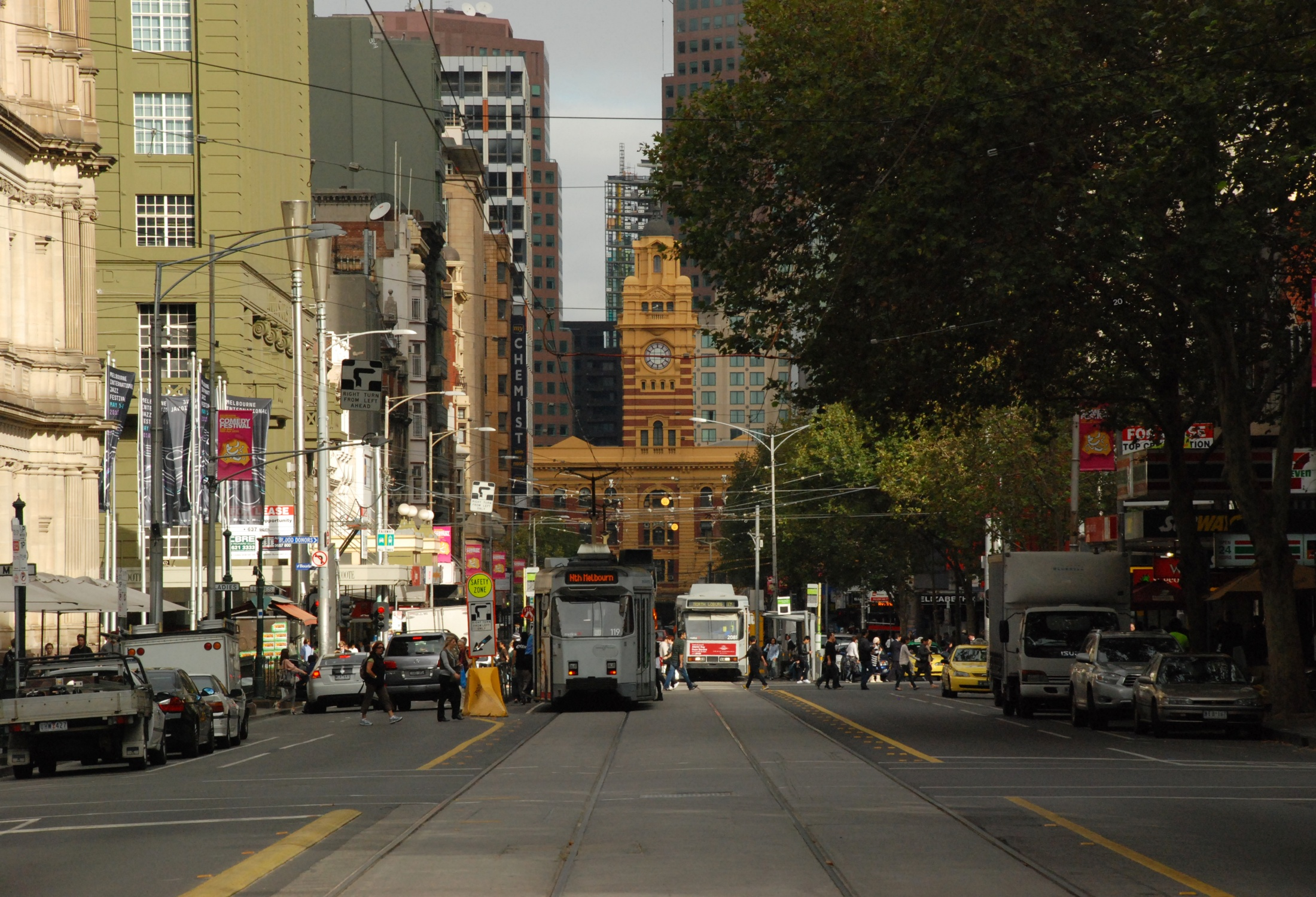
- Elizabeth Street looking south toward Flinders Street station, April 2010
- Coordinates: 37.8096°S 144.961°E

General information
- Type: Street
- Opened: 1837
- Route number(s): State Route 55 (2005–present) (Parkville–Haymarket roundabout)
- Former route number: National Highway 31 (1988–2005) (Parkville–Haymarket roundabout); State Route 3 (1965–1989) (Parkville–Melbourne)

Major junctions
- North end: Royal Parade; Parkville, Melbourne
- Grattan Street; Flemington Road; Peel Street; Queensberry Street; Victoria Street; Franklin Street; La Trobe Street; Lonsdale Street; Bourke Street; Collins Street
- South end: Flinders Street; Melbourne CBD

Location(s)
- Suburb(s): Parkville, Melbourne CBD

Elizabeth Street is one of the main streets in the Melbourne central business district, Victoria, Australia, part of the Hoddle Grid laid out in 1837. It is presumed to have been named in honour of governor Richard Bourke's wife, or for Elizabeth I.

The street is known as a retail shopping precinct. It is connected with key shopping and tourist destinations such as Bourke Street Mall, General Post Office, Melbourne Central Shopping Centre, Emporium Melbourne and Queen Victoria Market.

The intersection of Elizabeth Street and Flinders street has been the site of ongoing social and criminal issues in recent times.

== Geography ==
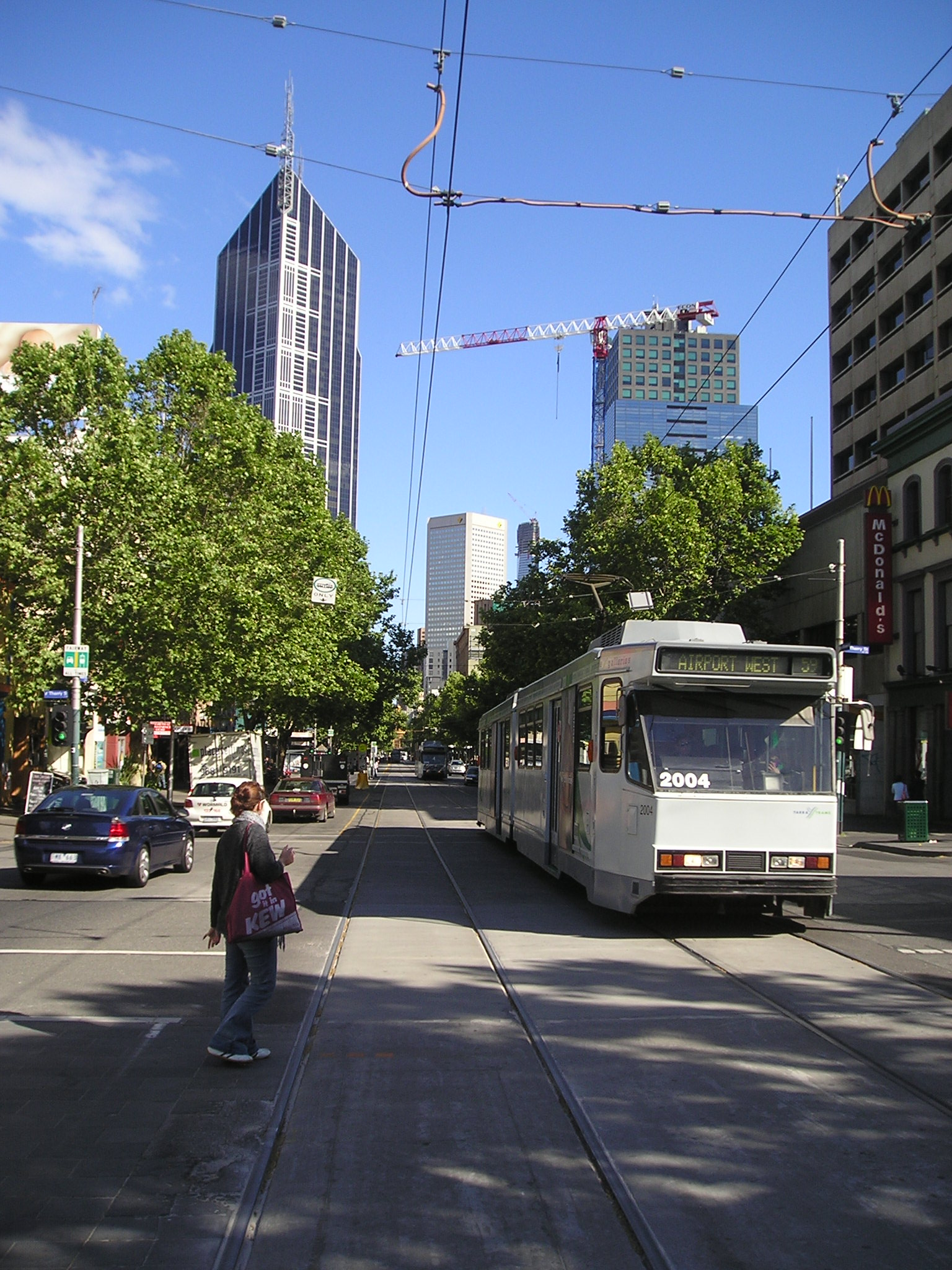
Elizabeth Street, looking south from the Queen Victoria Market

The street runs roughly north–south in-between Queen Street and Swanston Street. At the southern end the street terminates at Flinders Street station, whilst the northern end terminates at Grattan Street, north of the Haymarket Roundabout.

Haymarket connects Elizabeth Street to Peel Street towards the south-west, Flemington Road to the north-west, Royal Parade to the north and Grattan Street to the East. This complex, high-traffic roundabout is further complicated by trams travelling through it on varying routes. Traffic lights were installed on the roundabout in 2011 to limit the dangerous complexity of the intersection, it having previously functioned as a normal roundabout.

=== Floods ===
Elizabeth Street is the lowest point in the Melbourne central business district, with land rising both to the east and west, and more gradually to the north. The street was built on top of a historic natural creek and has suffered numerous floods in Melbourne's history.

Flash flooding south towards the Yarra River occurred in 1882, 1972 and more recently during the 2010 Victorian storms. The Elizabeth Street drain runs from Carlton in the north to the Yarra River in the south, carrying storm water from the inner northern suburbs and city centre. This drain is a significant source of pollutants entering the lower Yarra.

== Notable buildings ==
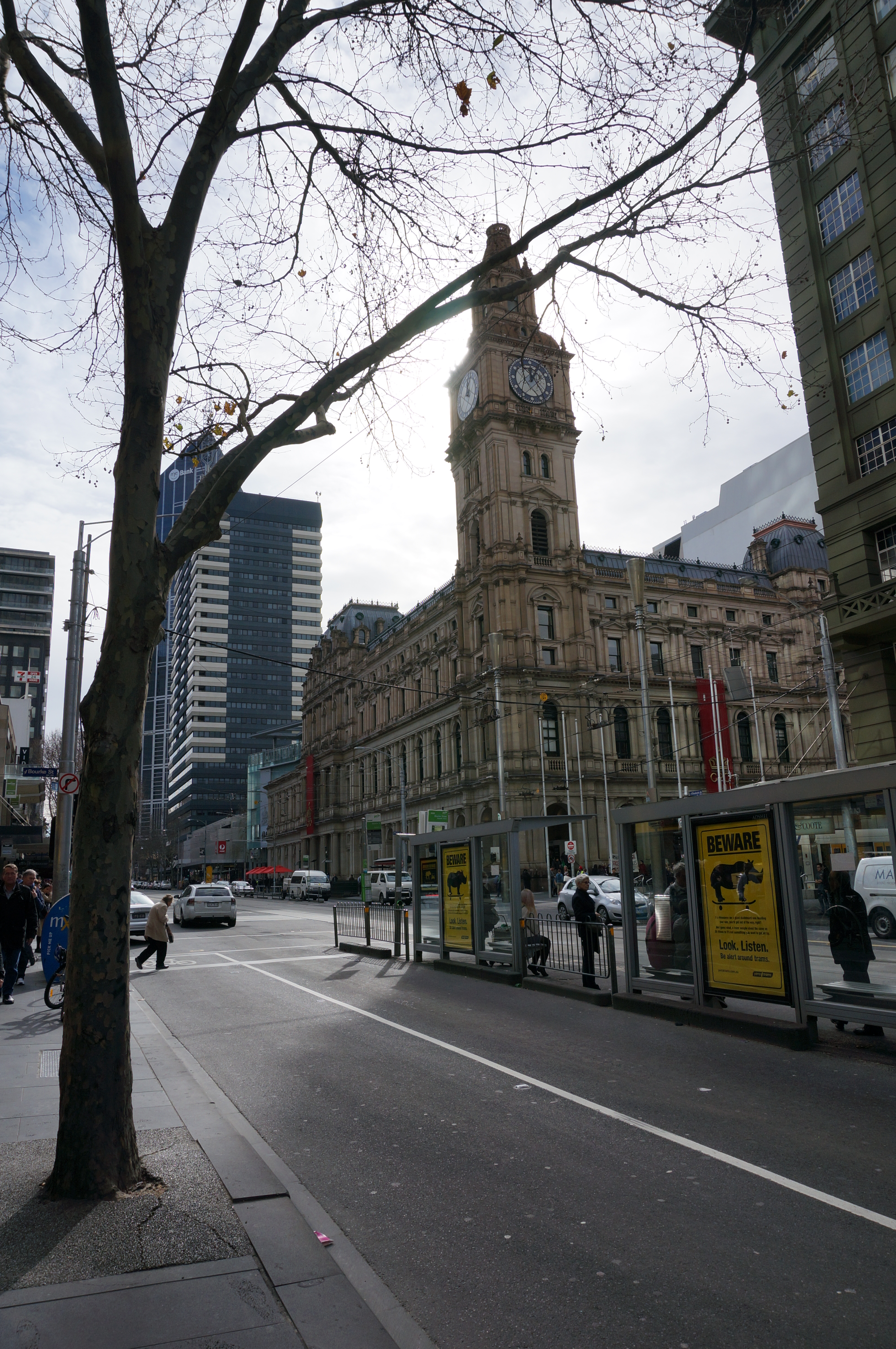
Melbourne's GPO is located on the corner of Elizabeth & Bourke Streets

Elizabeth Street is home to many historically important buildings, modern structures and works of art. These various works are listed on both the Victorian Heritage Register and National Trust of Australia.

=== Victorian Heritage Register ===
- Flinders Street Station
- Melbourne City Building
- General Post Office
- Underground Toilets
- Mitchell House
- Block Arcade
- Royal Arcade
- Queen Victoria Market
- Hosies Hotel Mural
- Former Melford Motors
- St Francis Church

=== National Trust ===
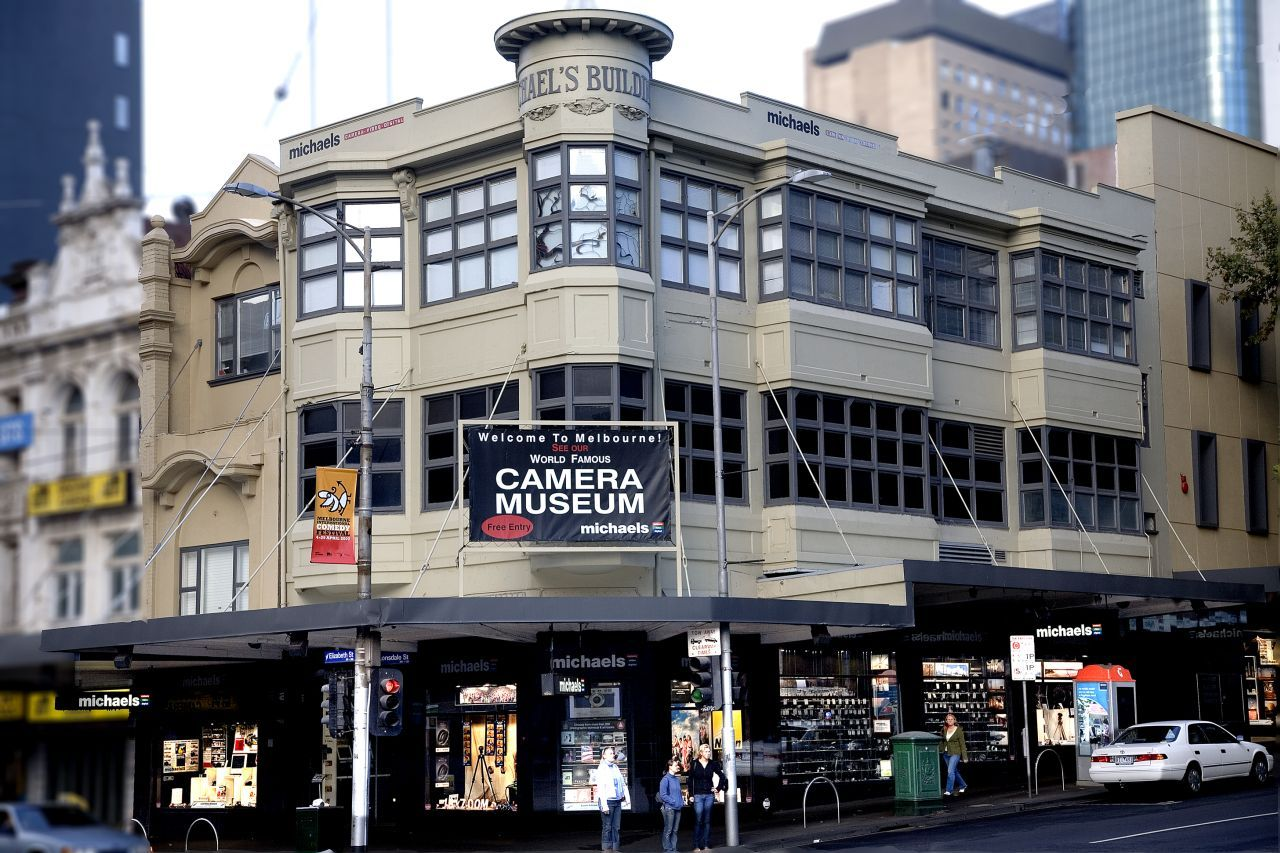
Michaels Building corner of Elizabeth & Lonsdale Streets

- 289 Elizabeth Street
- Angus & Robertson Building
- London Hotel
- Royal Saxon Hotel
- Argus Building
- Paton Building
- Brooks' Chambers
- Michaels Building
- Ampol House (demolished by the University of Melbourne and replaced with The Peter Doherty Institute for Infection and Immunity)
- Former Colonial Bank
- Former Kodak Factory Complex
- Former Hosies Hotel & Richard Beck Mural
- Womens Christian Temperance Union Drinking Fountain
- Heape Court Warehouses

== Motorcycle and Camera Precincts ==
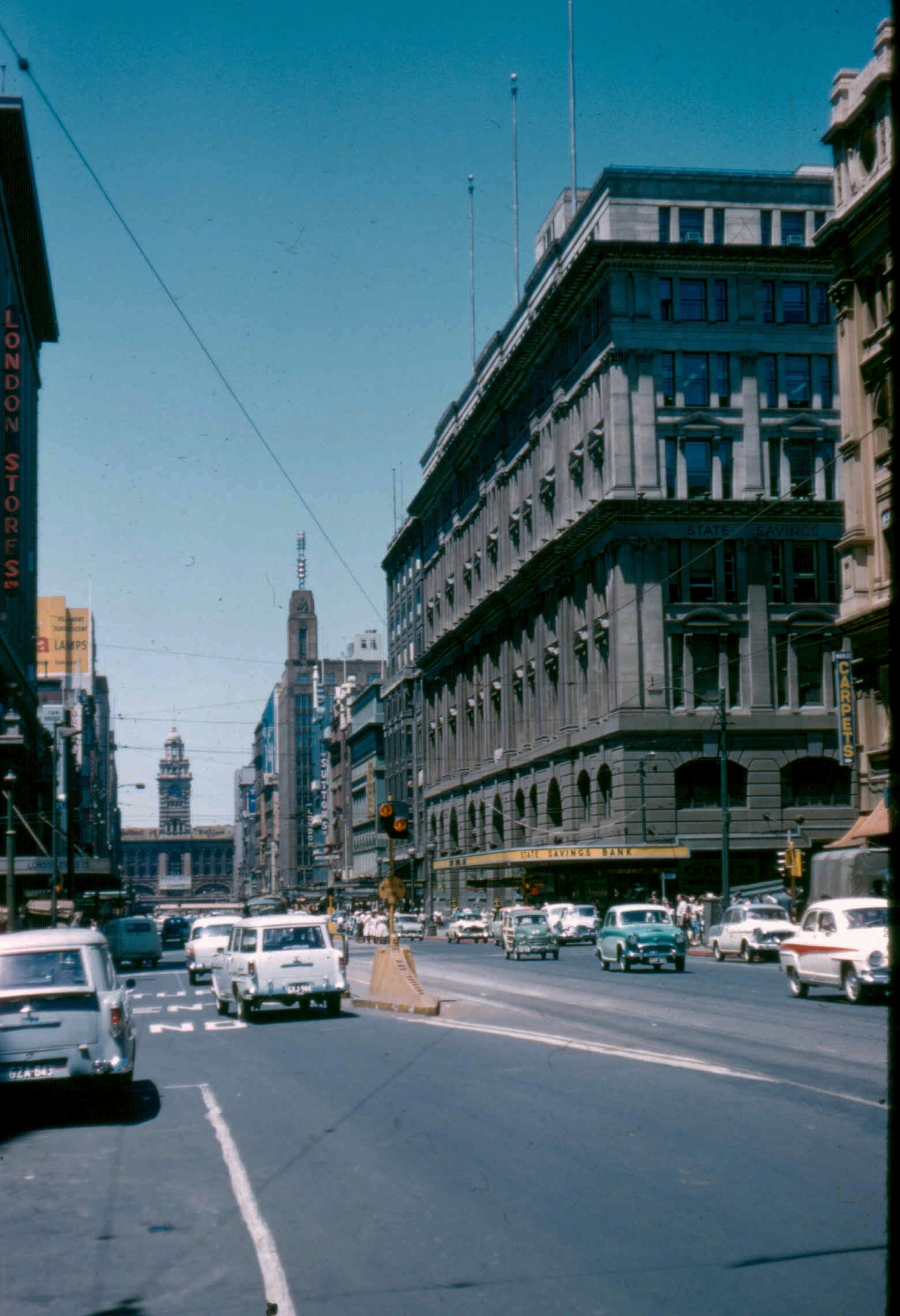
Elizabeth Street circa 1960

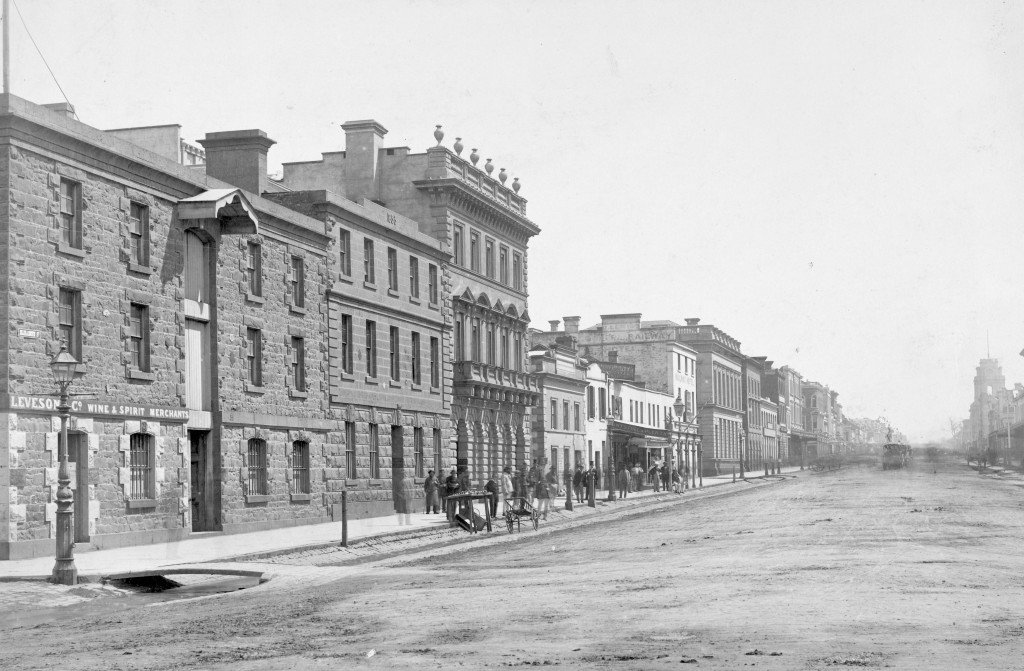
Elizabeth Street in 1870

Elizabeth Street has been home to a number of photography retailers and a considerable number of motorcycle dealers. The street has been the home of motorbike retailing in inner Melbourne since 1903, the longest-existing such area in the world.

== Transport ==
As well as Flinders Street station at the southern end, the western exit of Melbourne Central railway station is located at the intersection of Latrobe and Elizabeth Streets. A number of tram services run along the street, including route 19 trams to Coburg North, route 59 trams to Airport West and route 57 trams to West Maribyrnong.
