= Mitchell House, Melbourne =

Building in Melbourne, Victoria

Mitchell House
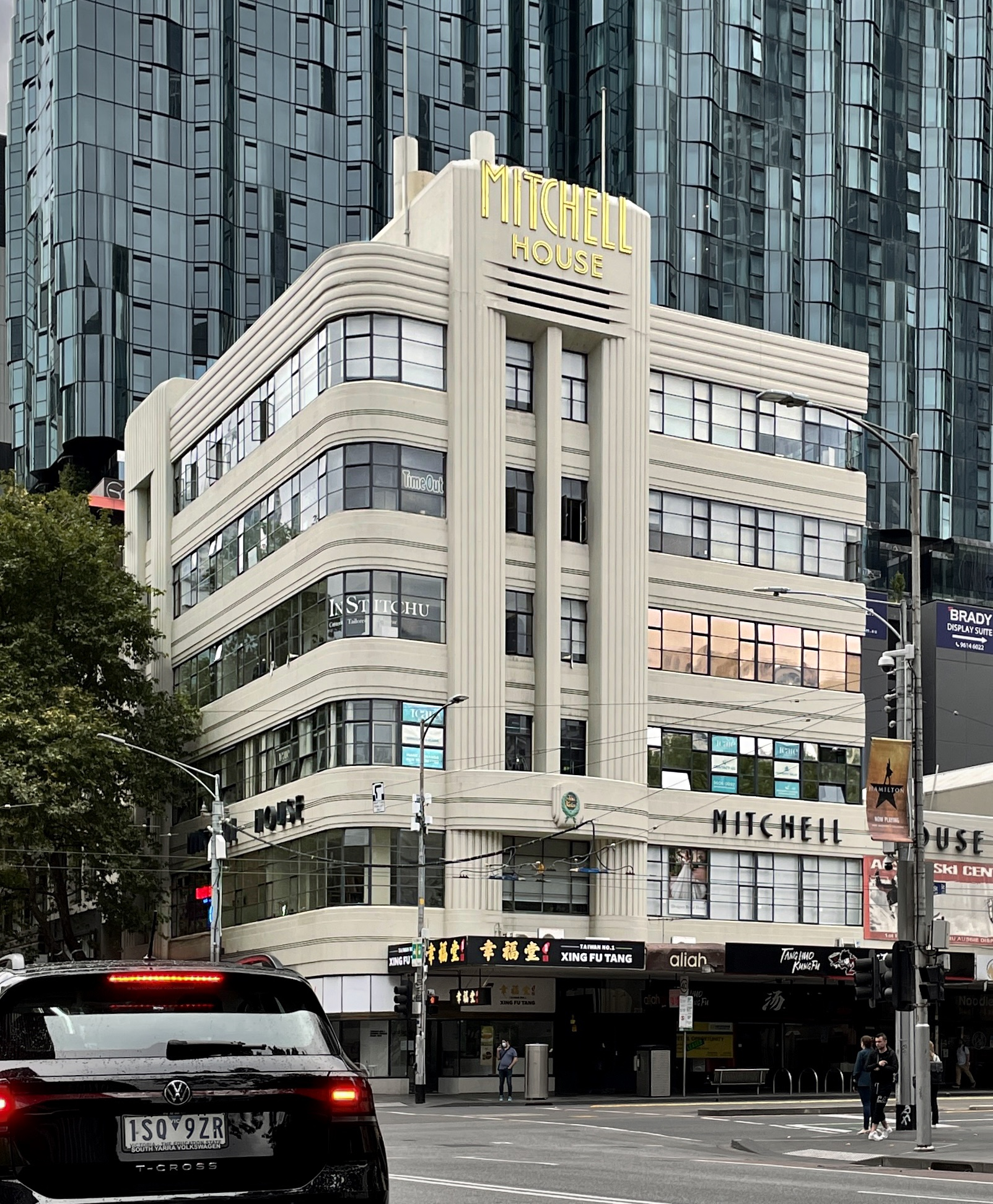
- Interactive map of the Mitchell House area

General information
- Location: 352-362 Lonsdale Street, Melbourne, Australia
- Coordinates: 37.8122°S 144.9619°E
- Completed: 1937
- Client: Thos. Mitchell & Co

Design and construction
- Architect: Harry Norris

Mitchell House is an historic six-storey Streamline Moderne commercial building located at 352-362 Lonsdale Street, on the corner of Elizabeth Street in Melbourne, Australia. It was built in 1937 for the Mitchell Brush Company, and designed by prolific architect Harry Norris.

== History ==
Mitchell House was built for Thomas Mitchell & Co, a long-established firm of brushware manufacturers. Their major brand name was Victor, with a logo of the name encircled by a wreath. The company occupied a site at 360 Lonsdale Street since the 1890s, and acquired the Commonwealth Hotel on the corner of Elizabeth and Lonsdale Streets in 1916; the hotel was described as one of Melbourne's oldest. In 1936 Mitchell's commissioned architect Harry Norris to design their headquarters.

It was initially designed as a ten-storey building up to the maximum height limit of 132 ft (40 meters), and out to the northern edge of the site. What was built by 1937 was only 6 levels, and well short of the northern boundary - this was described as the first stage, with the rest to come later. It was built by Hansen & Yuncken in only five months, at a cost of £150,000.

The company's original premises on Lonsdale Street, on the other side of a narrow laneway now called Mitchell Lane, was connected to the main building by elevated walkways, and its facade would be remodelled at a later date.

Mitchell's had their showroom on the second floor of the new building, and the other floors and the shops on the ground floor were tenanted. In 1940 they vacated the building for use by the cartographic section of the Australian Survey Corps, and never moved back. The building was sold in 1970, and the Mitchell company was dissolved in 1986.

The building was classified on 9 July 1987 by the National Trust, and added to the Victorian Heritage Register in 2010.

In January 2024, the Australian Financial Review reported that after more than 50 years' ownership, the Krongold family had sold the building, as well as the two shops to the north, to a 'Chinese syndicate partnered with a local investor'.

== Architecture ==
Mitchell House is a six-storey reinforced concrete commercial building in a Streamlined Moderne style, with a dominant horizontal emphasis, with bands of steel-framed windows and spandrels with incised 'speed lines' wrapping around the curved corner. On the Elizabeth Street frontage near the corner is a vertical element, defined by a pair of fluted piers, topped by the name Mitchell House in gilded letters, while on the base at the second floor is a panel with 'The Victor' logo. Mitchell House is also written in steel lettering along the second floor spandrel on each side. There is a similar vertical element on the west end of the Lonsdale Street elevation, marking the office floor entry. There is a pair of ornate Art Deco wrought iron gates across the end of Mitchell Lane. The ground floor shopfronts are largely intact. The entrance foyer is also intact, with the original doors, green faience tiles, a terrazzo floor in a pink and green, and a striking barrel-vaulted ceiling. The office floors are more utilitarian.
