= Bio21 Institute =

Australian research institute

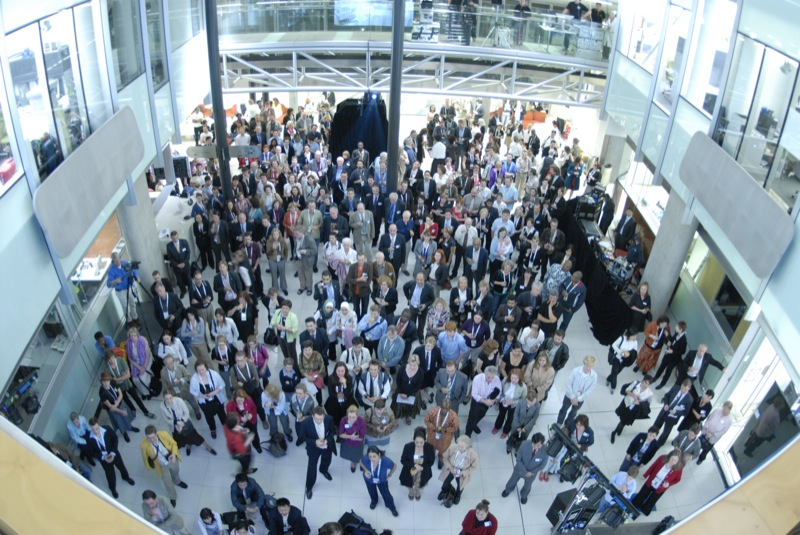
- The lobby of Bio21 Institute in 2007
- Established: 2002; 24 years ago
- Director: Michael Parker
- Faculty: University of Melbourne
- Location: Flemington Road, Parkville, Melbourne, Victoria, Australia
- Coordinates: 37°47′54″S 144°57′27″E
- Interactive map of Bio21 Institute
- Website: www.bio21.unimelb.edu.au

The Bio21 Institute of Molecular Science and Biotechnology, abbreviated as the Bio21 Institute, is an Australian scientific research institute that focuses on basic science and applied biotechnology. The Bio21 Institute is based at the University of Melbourne on Flemington Road in Parkville, Melbourne, Victoria.

The institute is managed by the University of Melbourne and is supported by funding from the Victorian Government.

== History ==
In September 2006, Bio21 formed a partnership with Australian-based global bio-pharmaceutical company CSL Limited. 50 scientists from CSL were relocated to participate in activities at the Bio21. The goal of the partnership was for Bio21 to gain the expertise of industry professionals and for CSL to gain access to state-of-the-art equipment.

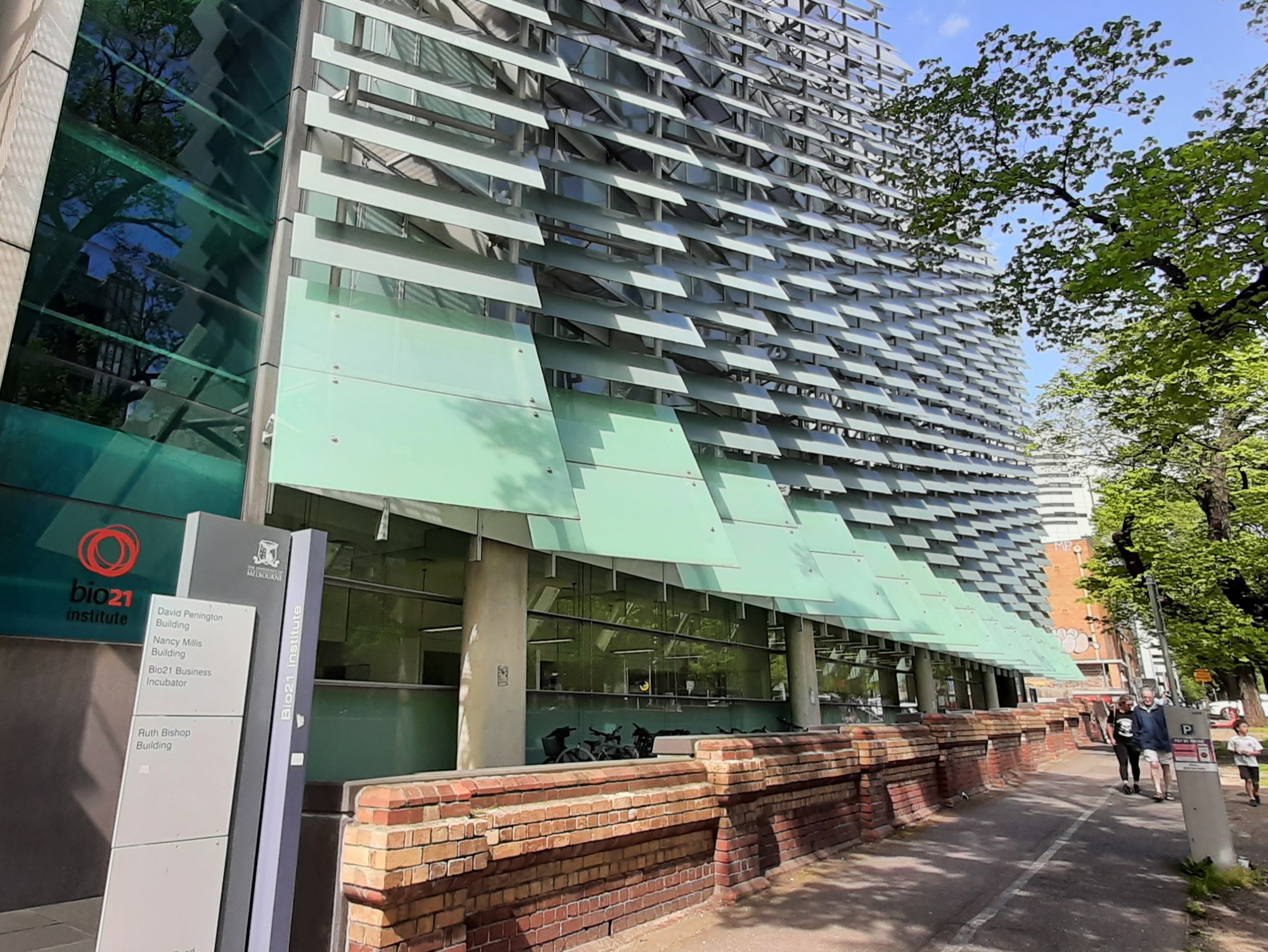
The facade of the Bio21 building

== See also ==
- Health in Australia
