= Frances Perry (philanthropist) =

Community worker in Melbourne in 19th century

- Born: Frances (Fanny) Cooper; 16 June 1814; Yorkshire, England
- Died: 2 December 1892 (aged 78); Loughrigg, Westmorland, England
- Occupations: Philanthropist; Community worker
- Known for: Head of committee that founded the Melbourne Lying-in Hospital (Royal Women's Hospital) in Melbourne, Australia
- Spouse: Charles Perry

Frances "Fanny" Perry (née Cooper; 1814–1892) was born in Yorkshire, England and migrated with her husband Charles Perry to Melbourne, Australia in 1848. Frances Perry was a philanthropist and community worker committed to the work of the church, morality and a focus on women's welfare. She was the chair of the committee that founded the Melbourne Lying-in (Royal Women's) Hospital, and was its first president from 1856 to 1874. She also had leading roles in the Governesses' Home, the Carlton Refuge, and was the first President of the Melbourne Orphan Asylum.

== Frances Perry House ==
The Melbourne Lying-in Hospital in Parkville, Melbourne is now known as the Royal Women's Hospital. In 1970 a maternity wing was opened and named Frances Perry House after her. This went on to become an independent private maternity hospital in 1997 called Frances Perry Private Hospital.
