= Upulie Divisekera =

Australian molecular biologist and science communicator

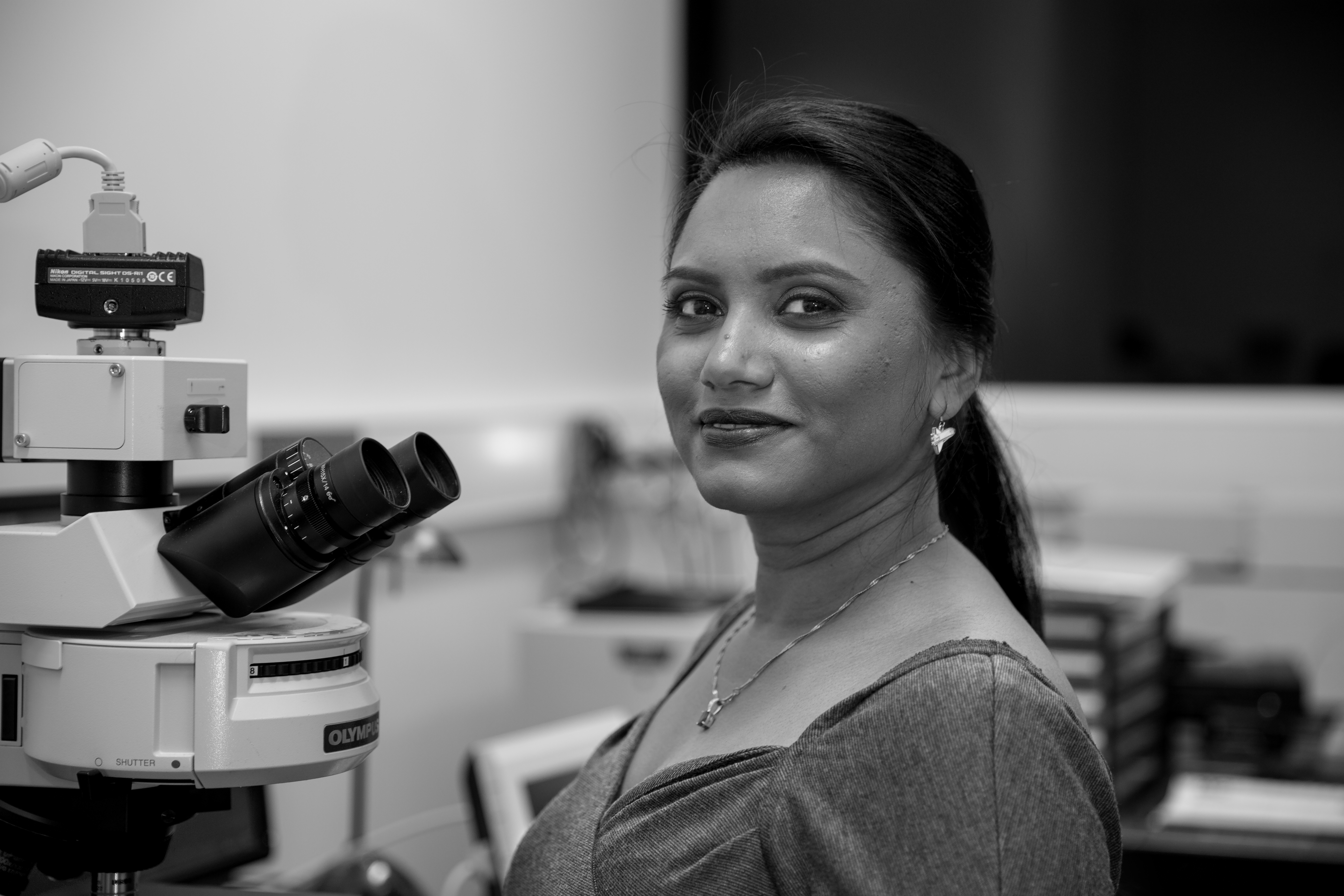
- Upulie Divisekera in 2017
- Education: University of Melbourne; Australian National University
- Scientific career
- Workplaces: Monash University

Upulie Pabasarie Divisekera is an Australian molecular biologist and science communicator. She is a doctoral student at Monash University and is the co-founder of Real Scientists, an outreach program that uses performance and writing to communicate science. She has written for The Sydney Morning Herald, Crikey and The Guardian.

== Early life and education ==
Divisekera wanted to be a scientist since she was a child. She is of Sri Lankan descent. After finishing high school she worked for biochemist Mary-Jane Gething from 1995 through 1997. She completed her undergraduate studies at the University of Melbourne in 2001. Here she worked on molecular parasitology with Malcolm McConville. Between 2002 and 2004, she worked as a research assistant at the Walter and Eliza Hall Institute of Medical Research on apoptosis and antibody production. She joined Australian National University for her postgraduate studies, graduating in 2007. Divisekera worked on the epithelial to mesenchymal transition in fruit fly embryos in Canberra. She worked as a research assistant at the University of Melbourne in 2007. Divisekera worked as a research assistant at Peter MacCallum Cancer Centre from 2008 to 2012. During this time, she worked in developmental biology and cancer research with Mark Smyth. She studied CD73 as a potential immunotherapy for breast cancer. She is a doctoral student in the department of chemical engineering at Monash University working on nanoparticles and drug delivery.

== Career ==
In 2011, Divisekera participated in and won the online science communication competition, "I'm a Scientist, Get Me Out of Here". Divisekera spoke at TEDx Canberra in 2012 on dinosaurs, curiosity and change in science. She has written for The Guardian, The Sydney Morning Herald, Crikey, and ABC TV's panel show Q and A, while also regularly contributing to ABC Radio National. In 2013, she was one of three co-founders of the Real Scientists project, a rotating-curator Twitter account where a different scientist is responsible for a week of science communication. Real Scientists looks to democratise access to science through live diarising of a scientists' day on Twitter, as well as demonstrating the diversity in the sector. She appears regularly on the Australian Broadcasting Corporation's radio channels. Divisekera provides training for academics, postgrads, clinicians and humanities students in science communication.

Alongside science communication, Divisekera is involved with arts programming, including events at the Wheeler Centre. She took part in a discussion with Cory Doctorow and Maggie Ryan Sandford about the prospect of inhabiting Mars in 2015. Since 2016 she has been a speaker at the Melbourne Writers Festival, and has spoken at The Writer's Bloc, the New South Wales Writers' Centre and the Emerging Writers' Festival.

Divisekera was included in the Government of Australia Chief Scientist "Five Scientist Pledge". She has spoken on Australian Broadcasting Corporation about what can be done to support more women into science. She gave a keynote talk at the March for Science in Melbourne. In May 2018 Upulie took on Elon Musk in a Twitter feud after he referred to nanotechnology as "bs". She is a contributor to the literary magazine The Lifted Brow.
