= Victorian Comprehensive Cancer Centre =

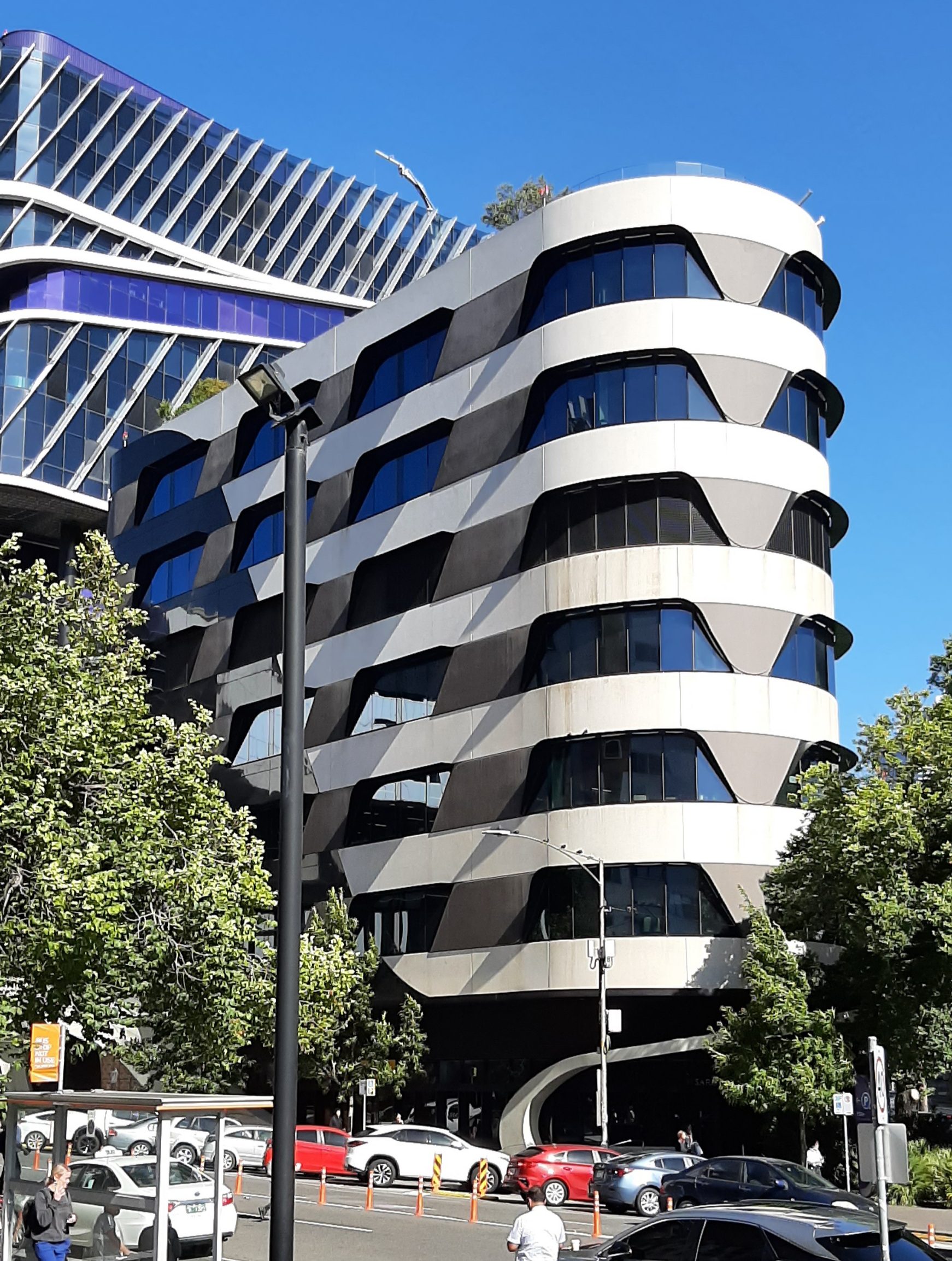

Geography
- Location: Flemington Road, Parkville, Melbourne, Victoria, Australia
- Coordinates: 37°48′1″S 144°57′24″E

Organisation
- Care system: Public Medicare (AU)
- Type: Specialist
- Affiliated university: The University of Melbourne

Services
- Beds: 160 overnight inpatient beds; 42-bed intensive care unit; 110 same-day beds
- Speciality: Cancer

Helipads
- Helipad: No

History
- Founded: 24 June 2016; 10 years ago

Links
- Website: www.viccompcancerctr.org
- Lists: Hospitals in Australia

The Victorian Comprehensive Cancer Centre (VCCC) is a multi-site, multi-disciplinary specialist cancer hospital and research centre located in Melbourne, Victoria, Australia. The VCCC comprises an alliance between The University of Melbourne, the Peter MacCallum Cancer Centre, Melbourne Health, the Walter and Eliza Hall Institute of Medical Research, the Royal Women's Hospital, the Royal Children's Hospital, Western Health, St Vincent's Hospital, Melbourne, Austin Health, and the Murdoch Children's Research Institute.

Comprising two facilities located on two sites, the VCCC building opened on 24 June 2016 in Melbourne's Parkville Biomedical Precinct, located on the intersections of Flemington Road, Grattan Street and Elizabeth Street. The building houses the Peter MacCallum Cancer Centre, formerly in East Melbourne. The second facility is located inside the Royal Melbourne Hospital. The two sites are joined by pedestrian bridges over Grattan Street.

== Cancer services ==
The VCCC as a multi-site collaboration is based on the NCI-designated Cancer Center model, which intends that through the collaboration of multiple sites, research and clinical care is increased.

Clinical cancer services on-site are found in the Peter MacCallum Cancer Centre, which house in total 160 inpatient beds, 110 same-day beds, 8 operating theatres, 2 procedure rooms and 8 radiation therapy bunkers. Additionally, there are approximately 1200 researchers that are housed in the upper floors of the VCCC.

== Building project ==
Designed by architects from Silver Thomas Hanley, DesignInc and McBride Charles Ryan, the building project was delivered as a public-private partnership, costing A$1.2 billion. Approximately $40 million in new medical and research equipment was bought prior to the opening of the new building. The project was delivered by the Plenary Health consortium, comprising PPP specialist Plenary Group, builders Grocon and PCL, and financiers including National Australia Bank. In 2015 the Premier, Daniel Andrews, made a controversial alteration to the project, removing a private hospital planned for the centre. In the months prior to its opening, building management signed tenants for commercial spaces including four cafes, a shop and a pharmacy. The buildings architecture has since been awarded the Victorian Medal and the William Wardell Award for Public Architecture in 2017.

== See also ==
- Health in Australia
