= Sarah Cleaveland =

British veterinary surgeon and epidemiologist

Sarah Cleaveland OBE FRS FRSE
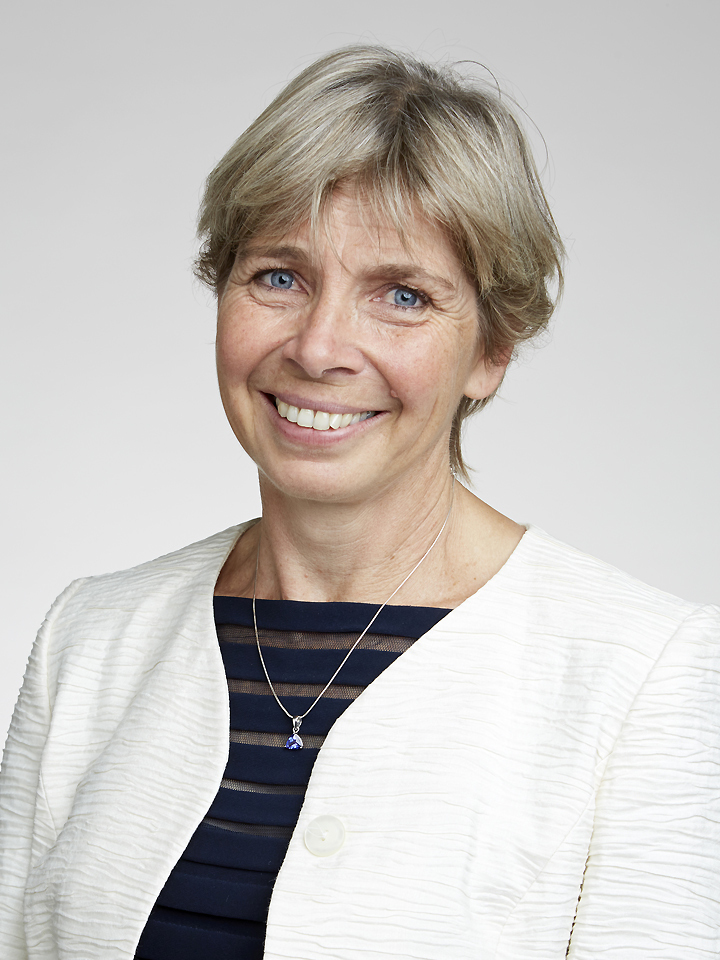
- Cleaveland in 2016
- Born: 1960 or 1961 (age 65–66); Malaysia
- Education: University of Cambridge (VetMB); London School of Hygiene & Tropical Medicine; (PhD)
- Awards: Leeuwenhoek Lecture (2018); Frink Medal (2016)
- Scientific career
- Fields: Infectious diseases; Zoonoses; Epidemiology; Neglected diseases; Tropical diseases
- Workplaces: University of Glasgow
- Thesis: The epidemiology of rabies and canine distemper in the Serengeti, Tanzania (1996)
- Doctoral students: Anna Louise Meredith
- Website: www.gla.ac.uk/researchinstitutes/bahcm/staff/sarahcleaveland/

Sarah Cleaveland (born 1960 or 1961) is a British veterinary surgeon and Professor of Comparative Epidemiology at the University of Glasgow.

== Education ==
Cleaveland obtained a Bachelor of Veterinary Medicine (VetMB) degree from the University of Cambridge in 1988 followed by a PhD from the London School of Hygiene & Tropical Medicine in 1996 for research on canine distemper and rabies in the Serengeti of Tanzania. During this time she was a postgraduate student at the Institute of Zoology in Regent's Park supervised by Chris Dye, Steve Albon and James Kirkwood.

== Career and research ==
She subsequently worked at the Centre for Tropical Veterinary Medicine, University of Edinburgh, before moving on to the University of Glasgow in 2008 where she is a professor at the Institute of Biodiversity, Animal Health and Comparative Medicine and a member of the Boyd Orr Centre for Population and Ecosystem Health. A large part of Cleaveland's research has focused on the epidemiology of zoonotic diseases in northern Tanzania, including rabies. Her work has involved the initiation of mass rabies vaccination programmes for domestic dogs in the Serengeti, which has not only indirectly prevented hundreds of human deaths, but also protected wildlife species such as the endangered African wild dog.

Her research has been funded by the Biotechnology and Biological Sciences Research Council (BBSRC) and the Medical Research Council (MRC). Her former doctoral students include Anna Louise Meredith.

=== Awards and honours ===
Cleaveland was the first woman to be awarded the British Veterinary Association Trevor Blackburn Award in 2008 in recognition of her work on animal and human infectious diseases in Africa. She was a founding director of the Alliance for Rabies Control, whose mission is to prevent human deaths caused by infection with the rabies virus and reduce the burden of this disease in animals. She was elected a Fellow of the Royal Society of Edinburgh (FRSE) in 2012, elected to the National Academy of Medicine (USA) in October 2015, elected a Fellow of the Royal Society (FRS) in 2016 and elected a Fellow of the Academy of Medical Sciences in 2019.

She was appointed Officer of the Order of the British Empire (OBE) in the 2014 Birthday Honours for services to veterinary epidemiology.

In 2018, Cleaveland was awarded the Leeuwenhoek Lecture by the Royal Society for "her pioneering work towards the eradication of rabies throughout the world".

In 2020, Cleaveland was awarded the George Macdonald Medal.
