= Peter MacCallum Cancer Centre =

Medical institute in Australia

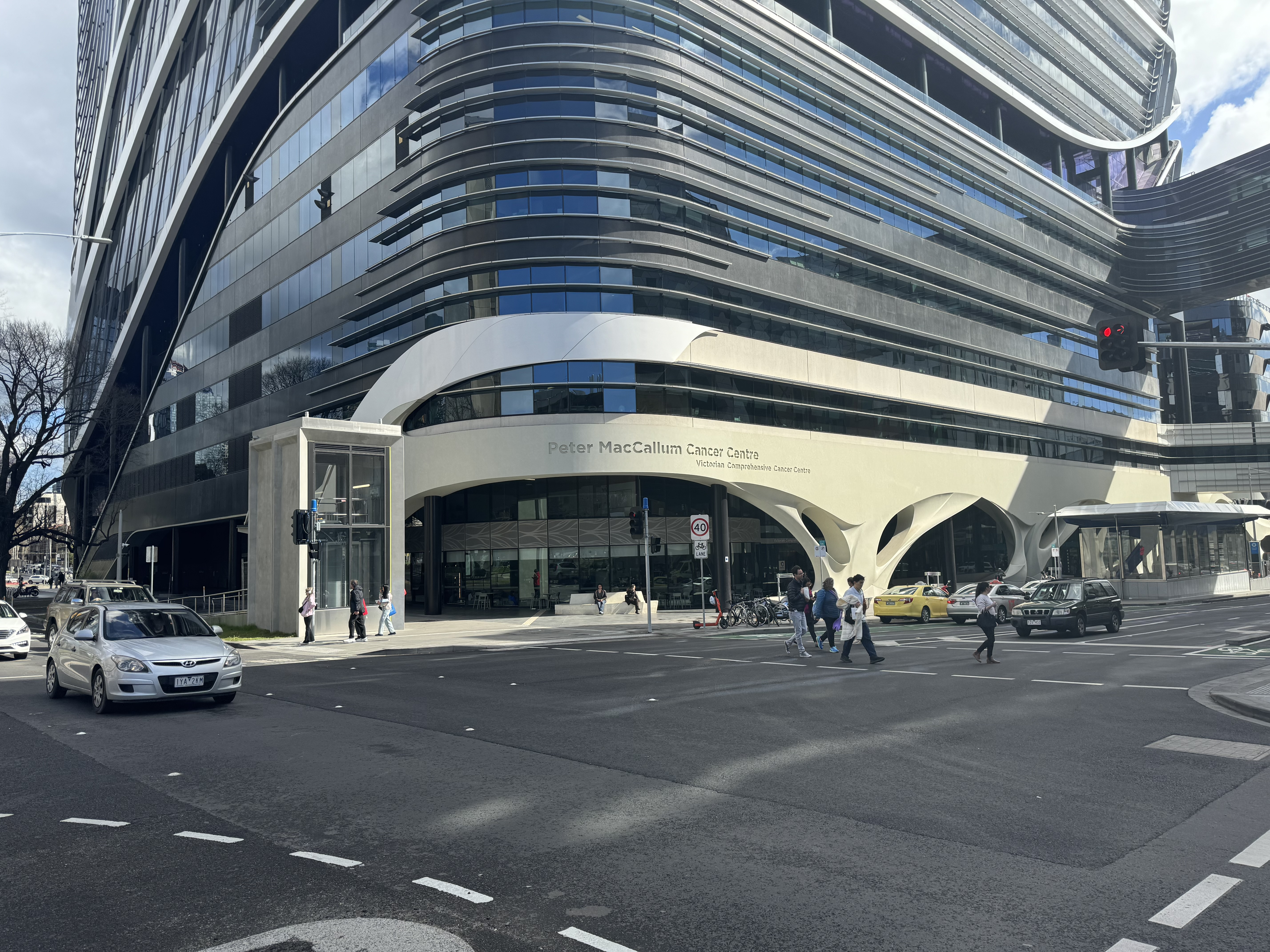
- The eastern and main entrance on Grattan Street and Royal Parade intersection
- Founders: Peter MacCallum; Rutherford Kaye-Scott
- Established: 27 April 1949; 77 years ago
- Mission: Medical research, patient care, education
- Focus: Oncology research and cancer treatment
- Chair: Professor Rosemary McKenzie
- Chief executive: Jason Payne
- Key people: Nicole Delaney
- Formerly called: Victorian Cancer Institute; Peter MacCallum Cancer Institute
- Location: 305 Grattan Street, Parkville, Melbourne, Victoria, Australia
- Coordinates: 37°48′1″S 144°57′24″E
- Interactive map of Peter MacCallum Cancer Centre
- Website: petermac.org

The Peter MacCallum Cancer Centre, also known as the Peter MacCallum Cancer Institute and commonly abbreviated as Peter Mac, is an Australian oncology research institute, cancer treatment and professional oncologist training centre located in Melbourne, Victoria. The centre is named in honour of Sir Peter MacCallum. Since June 2016, the centre has been located within the Victorian Comprehensive Cancer Centre (VCCC) in Parkville.

The centre is Australia's first public hospital dedicated to cancer treatment, research and education.

Research programs at the centre include the Australian Cancer Research Foundation (ACRF) Cancer Cell Biology Program and the ACRF Victorian Centre for Functional Genomics in Cancer.

== History ==
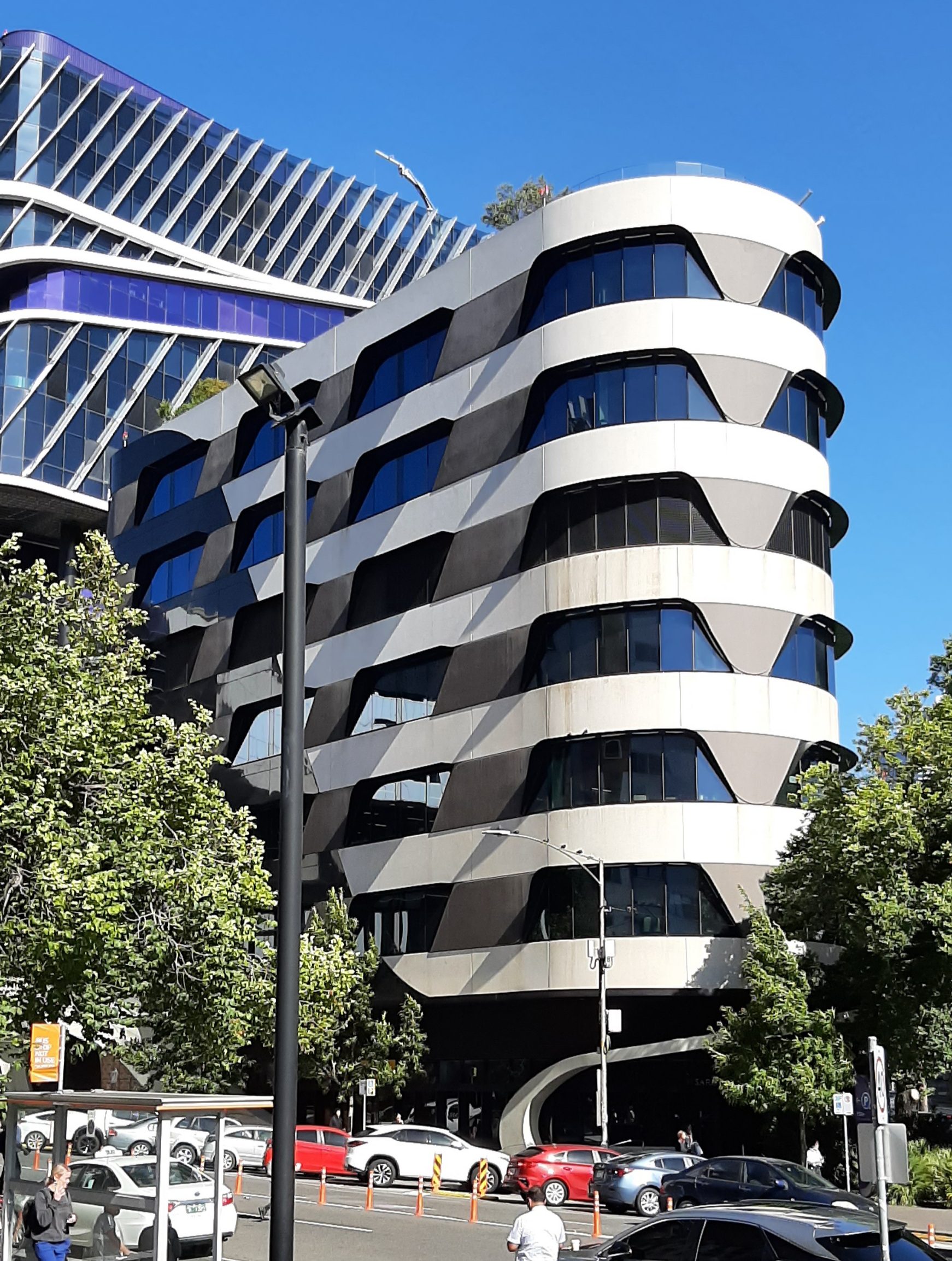
The Peter Mac is located within the Victorian Comprehensive Cancer Centre building

In 1949, the Victorian Cancer Institute was established and the following year its outpatient services were named the "Peter MacCallum Clinic". It was named after the (then) dean of the Faculty of Medicine at Melbourne University, Peter MacCallum who, with Rutherford Kaye-Scott, had a significant role in its founding. At the time it was a common practice not to inform patients that they had cancer. It was thought that because radiotherapy was also quite commonly used at that time to treat non-cancerous conditions such as severe acne, "strawberry birthmarks", frozen shoulders, keloid scars and also to provide a valuable and non-invasive means for medical sterilisation, the name "Peter MacCallum Clinic" was considered less threatening because the clinic could be positioned as a specialist radiotherapeutic centre rather than it being thought of as a dedicated cancer hospital.

The clinic was originally located in a single room of the Queen Victoria Hospital in central Melbourne. Its main facility was based at the corner William and Little Lonsdale streets, near Flagstaff Gardens where the County Court of Victoria buildings were later built. (The site was also at one time home to the Jessie McPherson Private Hospital.) The Institute established Australia's first training school for radiotherapists. In 1986, the institute (and the clinic) were collectively renamed as the "Peter MacCallum Cancer Institute". By 1994, the institute was operating out of 11 sites across Melbourne and it moved into St Andrew's Hospital in East Melbourne, which the state government had purchased from the Uniting Church of Australia and Presbyterian Church of Victoria in 1990.

== Achievements ==
The Peter MacCallum Cancer Centre is ranked 14th in the Newsweek 2024 World’s Best Specialised Hospitals. The Newsweek rankings, in partnership with global research company Statista, ranked Peter Mac alongside 1500 other specialised hospitals in oncology, cardiology, gastroenterology, neurology, obstetrics, paediatrics and more. Peter Mac was the only Australian hospital to be listed in the top 100 worldwide.

== Location ==
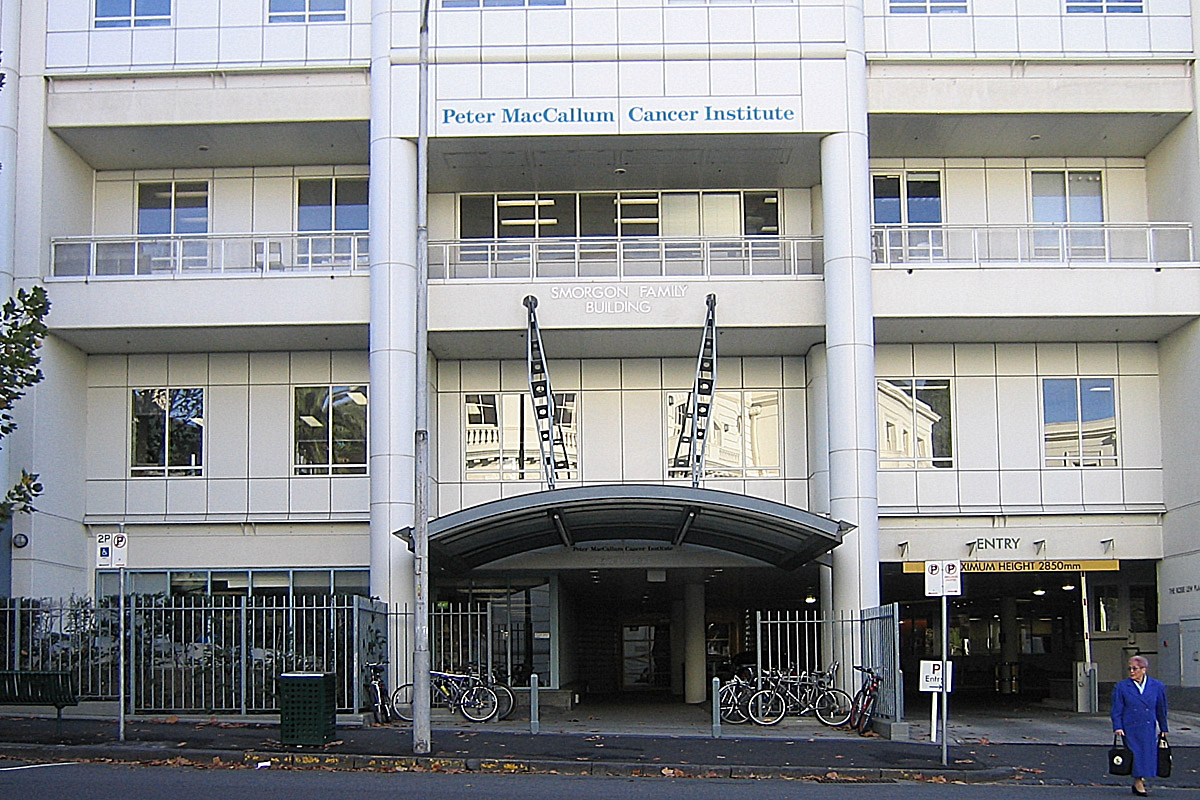
The former Peter Mac site in East Melbourne

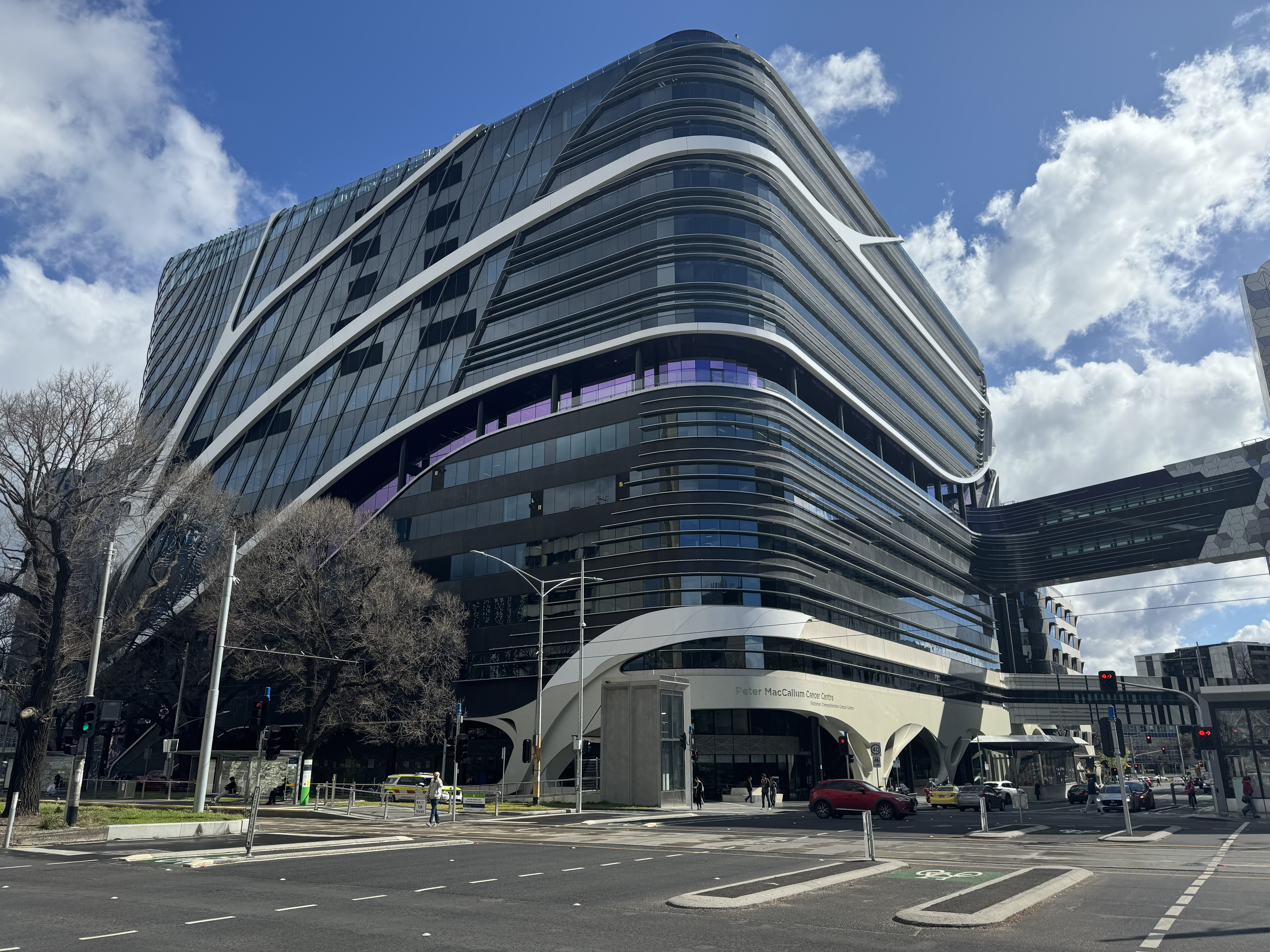
The current site of the Peter Mac site in Parkville, located on Grattan Street

In June 2016, the institute moved to the purpose-built building at the entrance to Melbourne's Parkville bio-medical precinct, located at 305 Grattan Street, Melbourne, with satellite services at the Bendigo Base Hospital, Epworth Eastern, the Monash Medical Centre (Moorabbin campus in East Bentleigh) and Sunshine Hospital in St Albans. It involves some shared services with the nearby Royal Melbourne Hospital, the Royal Women's Hospital and the Royal Children's Hospital. Its current site was previously home to the Royal Dental Hospital.

The $1 billion cancer treatment and research centre was designed by architects from Silver Thomas Hanley, DesignInc and McBride Charles Ryan.

== Notable staff ==
- Sarah-Jane Dawson
- Upulie Divisekera
- Declan G. Murphy
- Maxine Morand
