= Poultry CRC =

Defunct company

Poultry Cooperative Research Centre
- Company type: Not For Profit Cooperative Research Centre
- Industry: Poultry farming
- Founded: 2003
- Headquarters: Armidale, New South Wales, Australia
- Website: Poultry CRC

The Poultry Co-operative Research Center, or Poultry CRC, is a joint venture established and supported under the Australian Government's Cooperative Research Centre Programme.

The Poultry CRC's major challenge was to help Australia achieve sustainable, ethical poultry production in the face of population growth and climate change.

In July 2008, the Poultry CRC won the World's Poultry Science Association (WPSA) Industry/Organization Award at the World's Poultry Congress in Brisbane in recognition of an outstanding contribution to the development of the poultry industry. In August 2012, the Poultry CRC was awarded the WPSA's Education Award at the World's Poultry Congress in Brazil for their exceptional contribution to poultry education. In addition, the Poultry CRC received an Australian Collaborative Innovation Award in May 2012.

== Structure of the CRC ==
Poultry CRC was an unincorporated joint venture among seven essential participants and was governed by a skills-based board. It manages its research and development programme through a public company, Poultry CRC Ltd. Poultry CRC is headquartered at the University of New England in Armidale, New South Wales, and has an extensive collaborative network comprising researchers, educators, and support staff from its participating organizations. The original Poultry CRC was established on 1 July 2003, with the subsequent CRC being extended to 2017.

=== Essential Participants ===
- Australian Egg Corporation Limited
- Bioproperties Pty Ltd
- Commonwealth Scientific and Industrial Research Organization (CSIRO) Livestock Industries
- Department of Agriculture, Fisheries and Forestry (formerly DEEDI) Queensland
- Rural Industries Research and Development Corporation (RIRDC) Chicken Meat Program
- University of Melbourne
- University of New England

=== Other Participants ===
- Active Research Pty Ltd
- Alltech Biotechnology
- Aviagen
- Baiada Poultry
- Cordina Chicken Farms
- D.A. Hall & Co.
- Deakin University
- Feedworks
- FSA Consulting
- Golden Cockerel
- Hazeldene's Chicken Farm
- Hy-line
- Inghams Enterprises
- La Ionica
- Monash University
- Murdoch Children's Research Institute (MCRI)
- Northern Poultry Cluster
- Nutreco
- Pepe's Ducks
- Red Lea Chickens
- Scolexia
- The South Australian Research and Development Institute (SARDI)
- Ohio State University
- University of Adelaide
- University of New South Wales
- University of Queensland
- University of Sydney
- University of Western Australia
- Zoetis
- Zootechny

== Areas of research expertise ==
- Animal welfare
- Digestive physiology
- Environmental impacts
- Feed manufacture and formulation
- Immunology and microbiology
- Molecular and quantitative genetics
- Nutrition
- Vaccines and diagnostics

== See also ==
- Cooperative Research Centre
- Department of Innovation, Industry, Science and Research
