= Anna Meredith (veterinary surgeon) =

British veterinary scientist

Anna Meredith OBE FRCVS
- Born: Anna Louise Meredith b 03/10/1964
- Education: Magdalen College, University of Oxford (MA); Wolfson College, University of Cambridge (VetMB); University of Edinburgh (PhD)
- Scientific career
- Workplaces: Royal (Dick) School of Veterinary Studies; University of Edinburgh; University of Melbourne
- Thesis: Evaluation of predators as sentinels for emerging infectious diseases (2012)
- Doctoral advisor: Sarah Cleaveland
- Website: pursuit.unimelb.edu.au/individuals/professor-anna-meredith

Anna Louise Meredith OBE FRCVS is Pro Vice-Chancellor Executive Dean and Professor of Conservation Medicine at the Keele University, She was previously Professor of Zoological and Conservation Medicine conservation medicine at the Royal (Dick) School of Veterinary Studies, University of Edinburgh. From 2018 to 2022 she was Head of [Melbourne Veterinary School] University of Melbourne.

== Early life and education ==
Meredith's mother was a biology teacher. She was inspired by her mother's care for the planet, and joined the World Wide Fund for Nature. Her first job was at an animal and horse practise in Edinburgh. She worked alongside David Shannon, the veterinary surgeon for the Edinburgh Zoo. Meredith studied physiology at Magdalen College, University of Oxford and graduated in 1986. She qualified in veterinary medicine at Wolfson College, Cambridge University of Cambridge in 1999. Meredith worked in general practice for a year before moving to the Royal (Dick) School of Veterinary Studies (R(D)SVS) as a lecturer.

== Research and career ==
Meredith established the Exotic Animal and Wildlife Unit at the Royal (Dick) School of Veterinary Studies, which was the first in the United Kingdom. In 1992 she was appointed Head Veterinary Surgeon for the Royal Zoological Society of Scotland (RZSS) Edinburgh Zoo. She worked to embed exotic animal wildlife into the undergraduate curriculum. She was present for the key hole surgery that took place on a giraffe in 2004.

On the merit of her clinical and teaching work, Meredith was promoted to professor in 2015, before earning her doctorate. She worked on conservation medicine and the intersection of animal and human health. She has worked with Scottish Wildcat Action to protect her favourite species, the Scottish wildcat. She is interested in the diseases that are present in the wildcat population, and was part of the trap, neuter, vaccinate and release project.

Meredith completed a PhD in 2012 supervised by Sarah Cleaveland on the use of carnivores as sentinels – animals which can provide information about the ecosystems they live in. Meredith studied the antibodies inside foxes and used this to understand what animals were eating. Meredith and her research group found bacteria that cause leprosy in red squirrels in the United Kingdom. She also led a project to reintroduce beavers to Scotland, which had been hunted to extinction 300 years ago. Beavers are important in the maintenance of ecosystems; including forests and streams.

In 2010 Meredith was appointed chairperson of the Government of the United Kingdom Zoos Expert Committee. She has also served as a specialist for the European College of Zoological Medicine. Meredith served as director of postgraduate taught programmes. In June 2018 Meredith was made head of the Melbourne Veterinary School in the University of Melbourne Faculty of Veterinary and Agricultural Sciences. Meredith left her role at the University of Melbourne in January 2022.

=== Awards and honours ===
Her awards and honours include;

- 2003 British Small Animal Veterinary Association Blaine Award
- 2016 Appointed to the Scottish Science Advisory Council
- 2018 Elected to the council of the Scottish Wildlife Trust
- 2019 Appointed Officer of the Order of the British Empire for services to veterinary surgery in the 2019 New Year Honours
- 2023 Appointed to the UK Government's Animal Sentience Committee

Meredith was elected a Fellow of the Royal College of Veterinary Surgeons (FRCVS).

=== Books ===
Meredith has contributed to several books, including;

- BSAVA Manual of Exotic Pets
- Wildlife Medicine and Rehabilitation: Self-Assessment Color Review
- BSAVA Manual of Rabbit Medicine
- BSAVA Small Animal Formulary: Part B: Exotic Pets
