= Frances Perry Private Hospital =

Hospital in Australia

Coordinates: 37°47′55″S 144°57′18″E

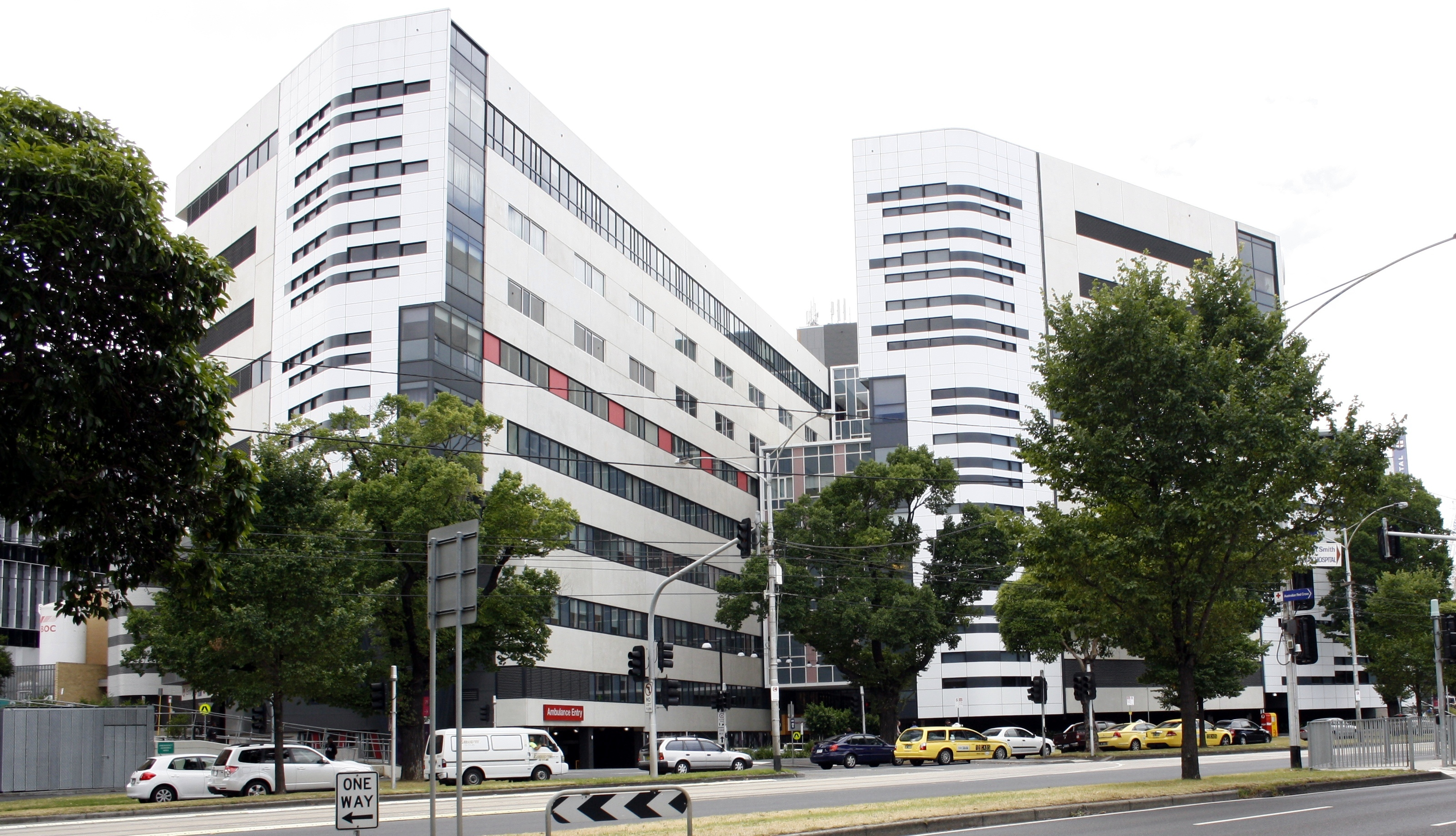

Frances Perry House, co-located with the Royal Women's Hospital in the Melbourne suburb of Parkville, is a 69-bed private hospital for women run by Ramsay Healthcare.

The hospital specialises in obstetrics, gynaecology, neonatology, breast surgery, day surgery, reconstructive surgery and plastic surgery.

Three floors of the Royal Women's Hospital in Carlton were opened as Frances Perry House on 2 November 1970 and named after Frances (Fanny) Perry, a key founder of the hospital. This facility offered maternity services to private patients who did not qualify for a free public bed at the time. It continued operating after the introduction of Medibank in 1975. It was fully privatised in 1997.
