= Royal Women's Hospital =

The Royal Women's Hospital
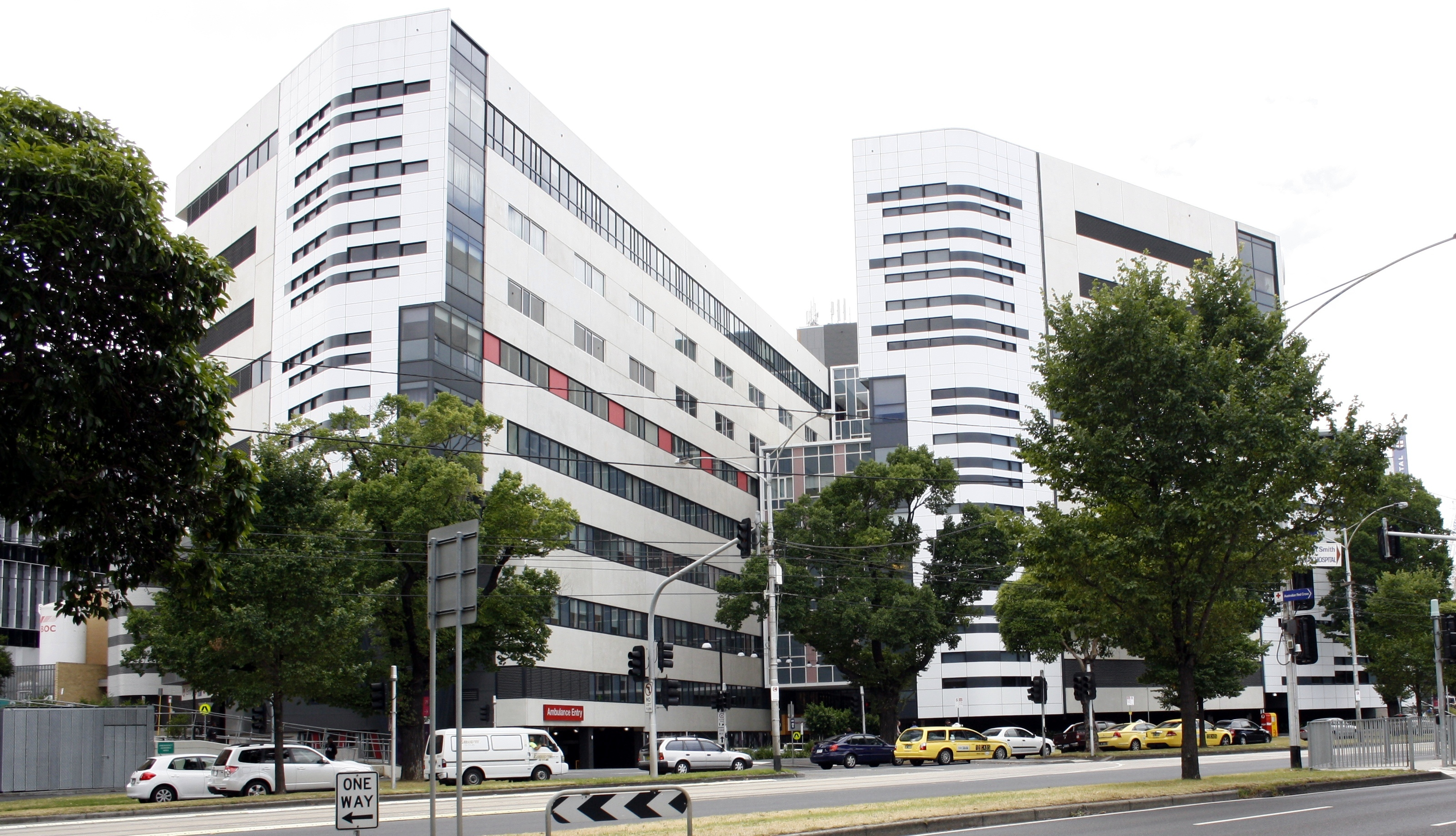
- The Royal Women's Hospital in Parkville

Geography
- Location: 20 Flemington Road, Parkville, Melbourne, Victoria, Australia
- Coordinates: 37°47′55″S 144°57′18″E

Organisation
- Care system: Public Medicare (AU)
- Type: Specialist

Services
- Emergency department: Yes
- Beds: 200
- Speciality: Women’s health, Maternity, Gynaecology, Neonatal

History
- Founded: 1856

Links
- Website: www.thewomens.org.au
- Lists: Hospitals in Australia

The Royal Women's Hospital, located in the Melbourne suburb of Parkville, is Australia's oldest specialist women's hospital. It offers a full range of services in maternity, gynaecology, neonatal care, women's cancers and women's health. It also offers complementary services such as social work, physiotherapy, dietetics, genetic counselling and pastoral care. Specialist clinics in endometriosis, chronic pelvic pain, menopause symptoms after cancer, and infertility are also available. It is a major teaching hospital of over 200 beds with links to the University of Melbourne and La Trobe University. Co-located in the same building is the Frances Perry Private Hospital, a 69-bed private hospital for women.

== History ==
The hospital was established at Eastern Hill by doctors Richard Tracy and John Maund on 19 August 1856 as a place where under-privileged women could give birth with proper medical attention. The doctors were assisted by a group of women led by Mrs Frances Perry, the wife of Charles Perry, the Bishop of Melbourne. The original title for the hospital was the Melbourne Lying-in Hospital and Infirmary for Diseases Peculiar to Women and Children.

The Women's was the first specialist teaching hospital in the Antipodes, and the first hospital in Australia to train nurses and midwives and the first in Australia to hold postgraduate classes for nurses.

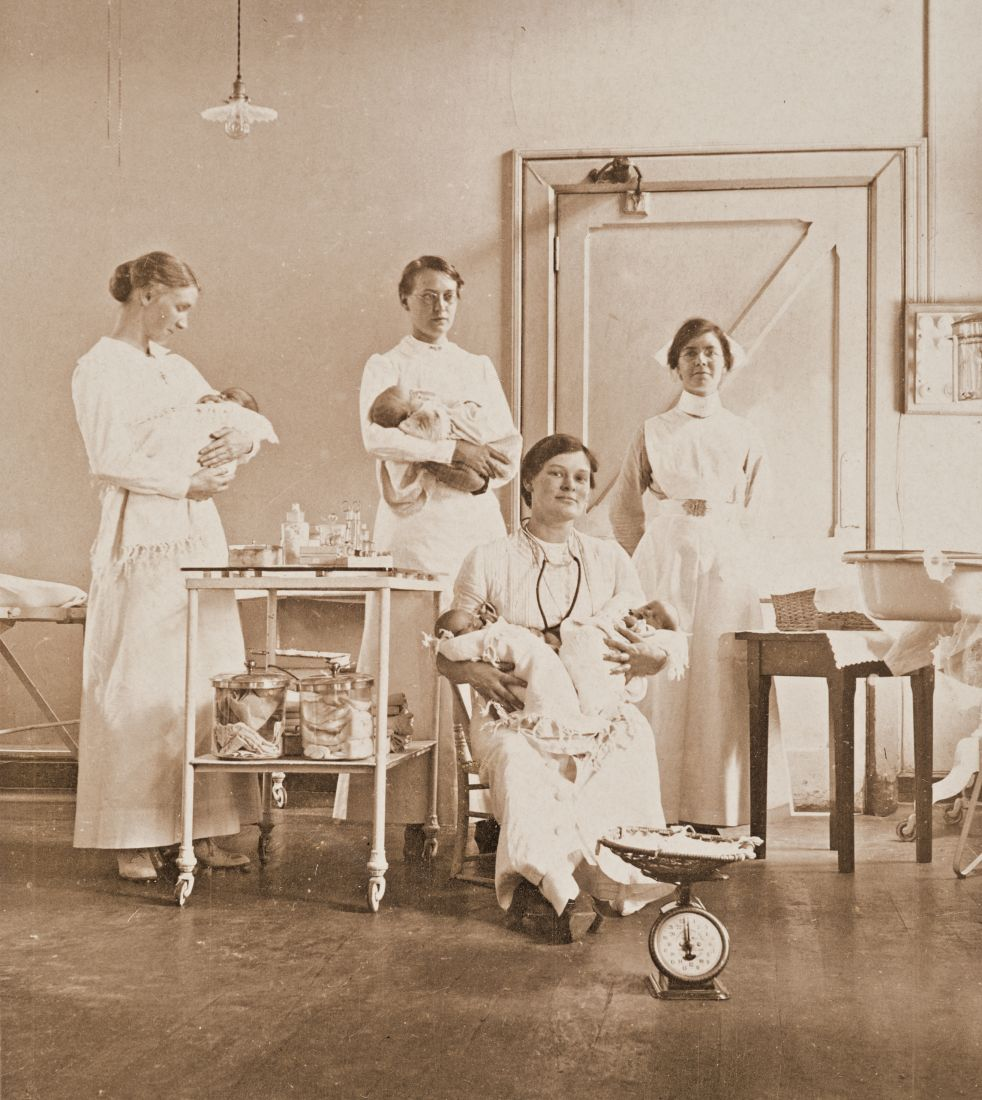
Drs Ellen Balaam, Annie Lister Bennett and Gweneth Wisewould, some babies and a nurse at the Women’s Hospital in 1915

In 1858 it was relocated to a site in Carlton, which spanned the block between Swanston and Cardigan Streets and Grattan and Faraday Streets. In March 1884, the hospital was renamed The Hospital for Women, with the royal title being conferred on 6 September 1954.

In 2005, then Victorian Premier Steve Bracks and Health Minister Bronwyn Pike announced a major redevelopment and relocation of the Royal Women's Hospital and Frances Perry Private Hospital next to the Royal Melbourne Hospital on the corner of Grattan Street and Flemington Road in Parkville. The new building and facilities, built by Baulderstone, were opened on 13 June 2008. The new building cost the Victorian Government $250 million, and has the capacity for more than 7,000 births per year.
