= Parkville, Victoria =

Parkville
- Suburb
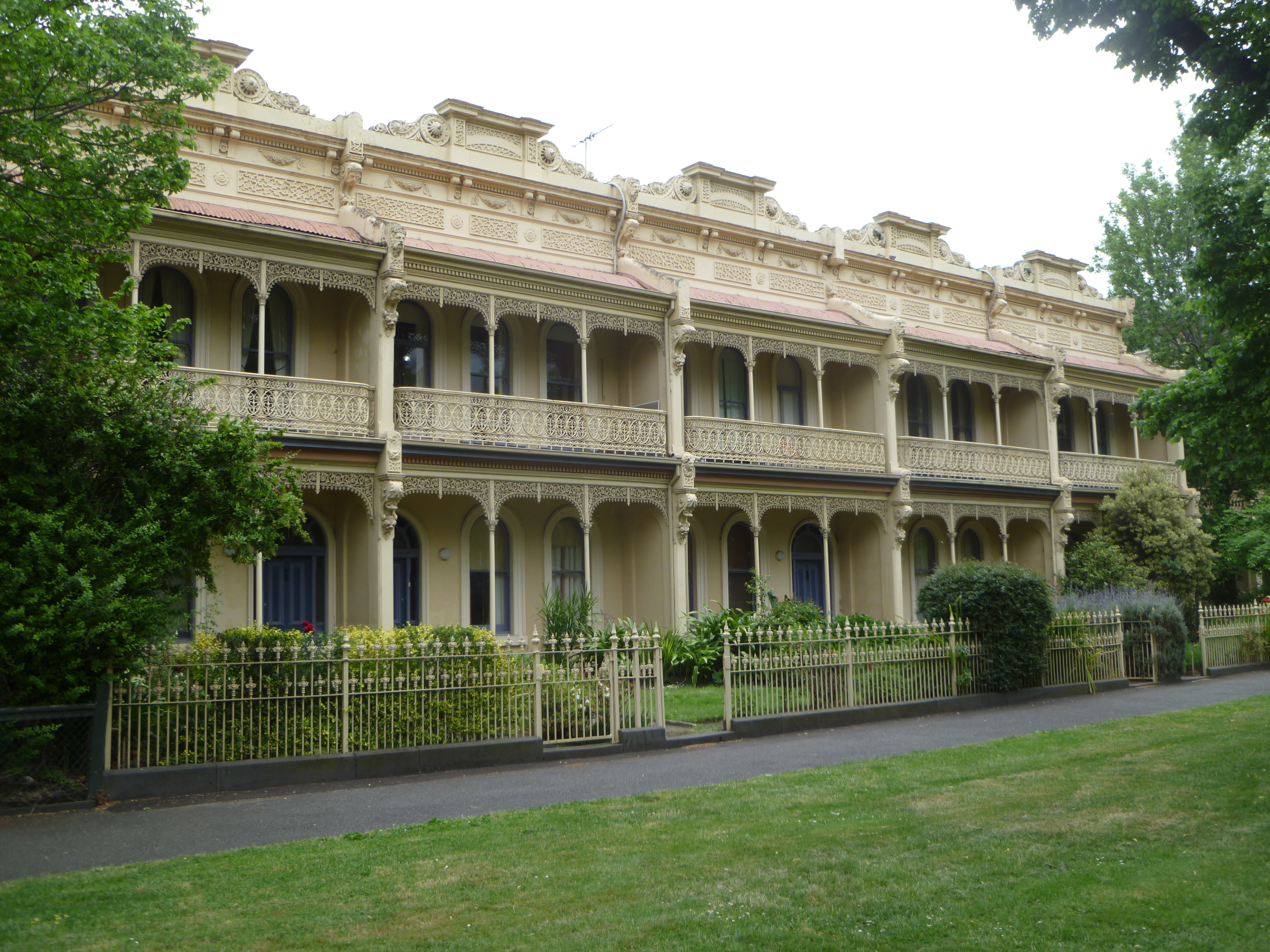
- Terrace houses in Parkville

- Interactive map of Parkville
- Coordinates: 37.788°S 144.951°E
- Country: Australia
- State: Victoria
- City: Melbourne
- LGAs: City of Melbourne; City of Merri-bek
- Location: 3 km (1.9 mi) N of Melbourne
- Established: 1861

Government
  - State electorates: Brunswick; Melbourne
  - Federal division: Melbourne

Area
  - Total: 4 km^{2} (1.5 sq mi)
- Elevation: 41 m (135 ft)

Population
  - Total: 7,074 (2021 census)
  - Density: 1,770/km^{2} (4,600/sq mi)
- Postcode: 3052, 3010
Suburbs around Parkville
Moonee Ponds	Brunswick West	Brunswick
Flemington; Travancore	Parkville	Carlton North
North Melbourne	Melbourne	Carlton

Parkville is an inner-city suburb in Melbourne, Victoria, Australia, 3 km (1.9 mi) north of Melbourne's Central Business District, located within the Cities of Melbourne and Merri-bek local government areas. Parkville recorded a population of 7,074 at the 2021 census.

Parkville is bordered by North Melbourne to the south-west, Carlton and Carlton North to the south and east, Brunswick to the north (where a part of Parkville lies within the City of Merri-bek), and Flemington to the west. The suburb includes the postcodes 3052 and 3010 (University).

The suburb encompasses Royal Park, an expansive parkland which is notable as home to the Royal Melbourne Zoological Gardens. Parkville was also the location of the athlete's village for the 2006 Commonwealth Games.

Parkville is a major education, research and healthcare precinct and home to the University of Melbourne, Monash University Pharmacy faculty, Royal Melbourne Hospital, Royal Women's Hospital, Royal Children's Hospital, the Victorian Comprehensive Cancer Centre and CSL.

The residential areas have a high median house price due to the proximity to the city centre and parkland, Victorian era buildings, terrace houses and tree-lined streets.

== History ==
=== Toponymy ===
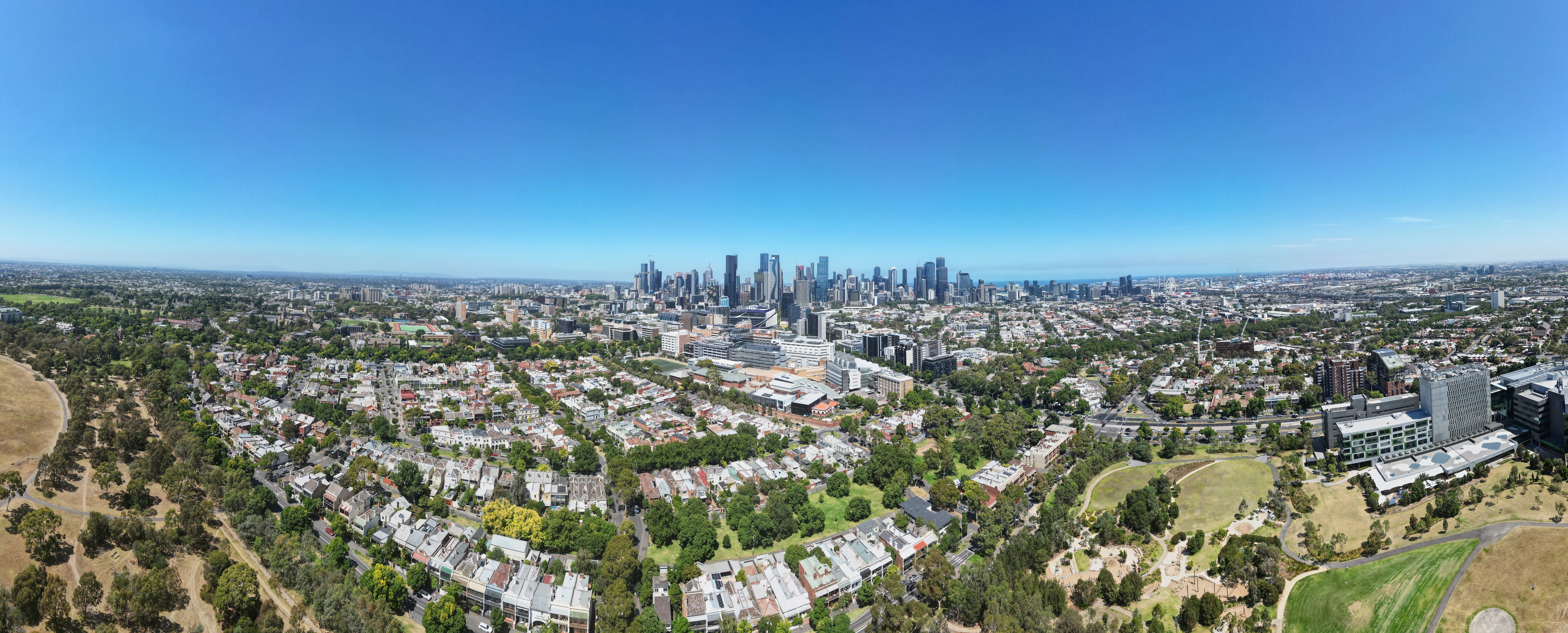
Melbourne city skyline panorama, as seen from Royal Park

Originally known as Park ville or Park-ville, the origins of the name are uncertain. The suburb may have been named after Royal Park. Park-ville was the name of one of the early homes along Flemington Road owned by the Ryan family in the 1870s, and there was once a street in Hotham named Parkville Street, which may have led toward this home. Before the 1870s, much of the area was known as either Hotham (North Melbourne) or Carlton, and during this time Parkville was simply a locality of Carlton. The name Park Ville came into common use after 1875, and was gradually shortened to its current form.

=== University and beginnings ===
The first institution of significance erected in the Parkville area was the University of Melbourne in 1853. A housing estate commenced sales in 1861 at what is now Parkville South. In 1868, further excisions from Royal Park were made for housing estates at Parkville North, along Royal Parade, and Parkville West, near Flemington Road. By the 1870s Parkville was a popular area for the middle class, and many large terrace houses were built in the area.

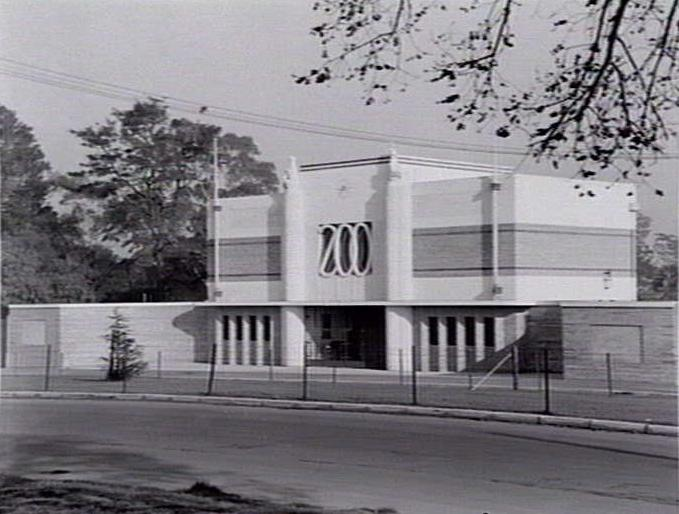
Royal Melbourne Zoological Gardens in 1940

=== Between the wars ===
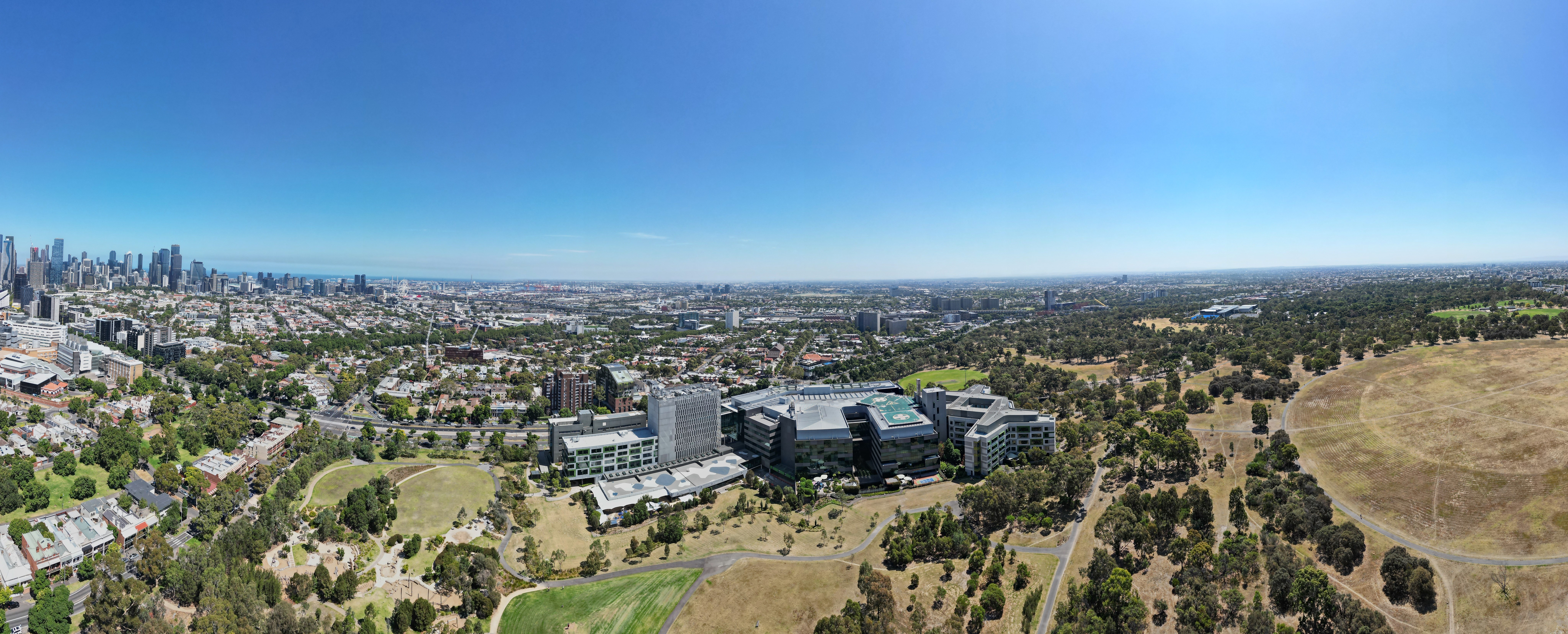
Aerial panorama of Royal Park. The Melbourne skyline sits on the left of the horizon.

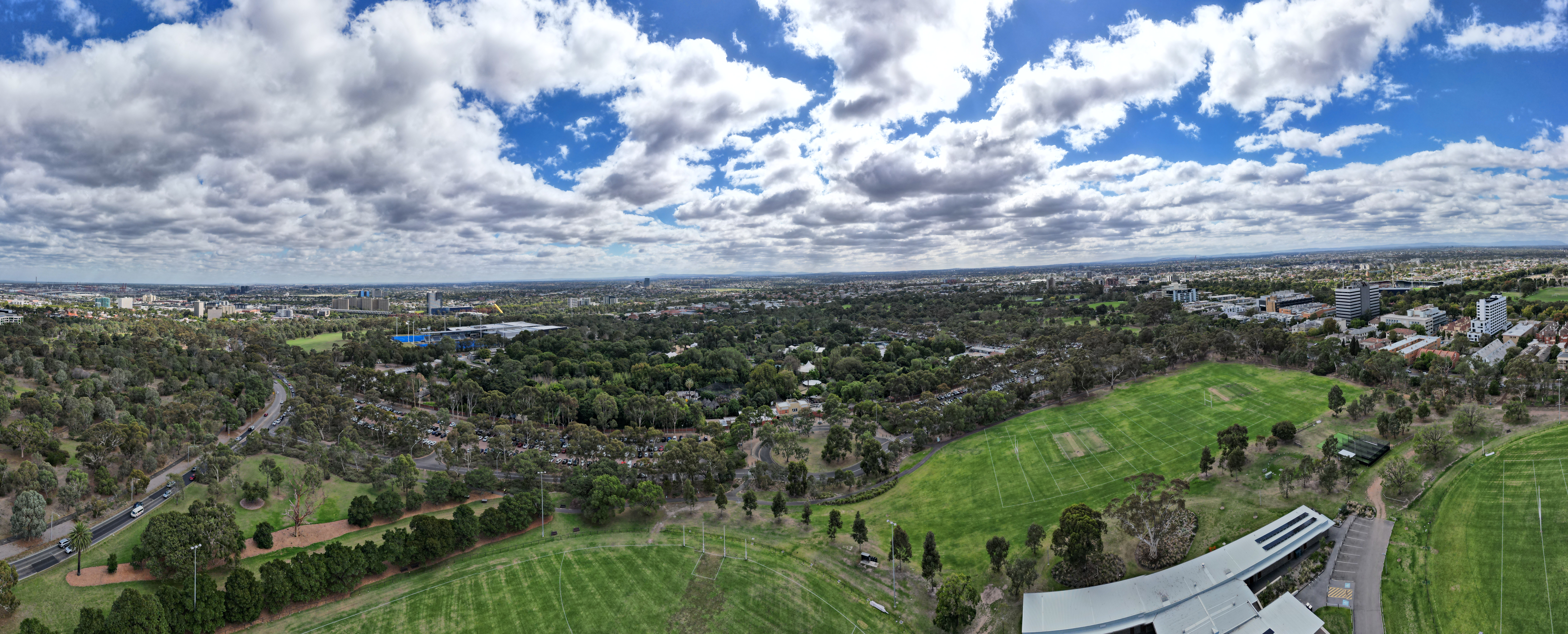
Aerial panorama of Parkville, and the Melbourne Zoo

During World War One and Two, Royal Park was the site of military encampments. Camp Pell in Royal Park was the temporary military camp for United States forces during the Second World War.

In 1944, Melbourne Hospital was moved to Parkville.

In 1960 Parkville became home to the Victorian College of Pharmacy, on Royal Parade, which is now a campus of Monash University.

The Athlete's Village for the 2006 Commonwealth Games was built on the grounds of the former Royal Park Psychiatric Hospital located in Parkville. The Athlete's Village has since been converted into a residential area known as Parkville Gardens.

== Demographics ==
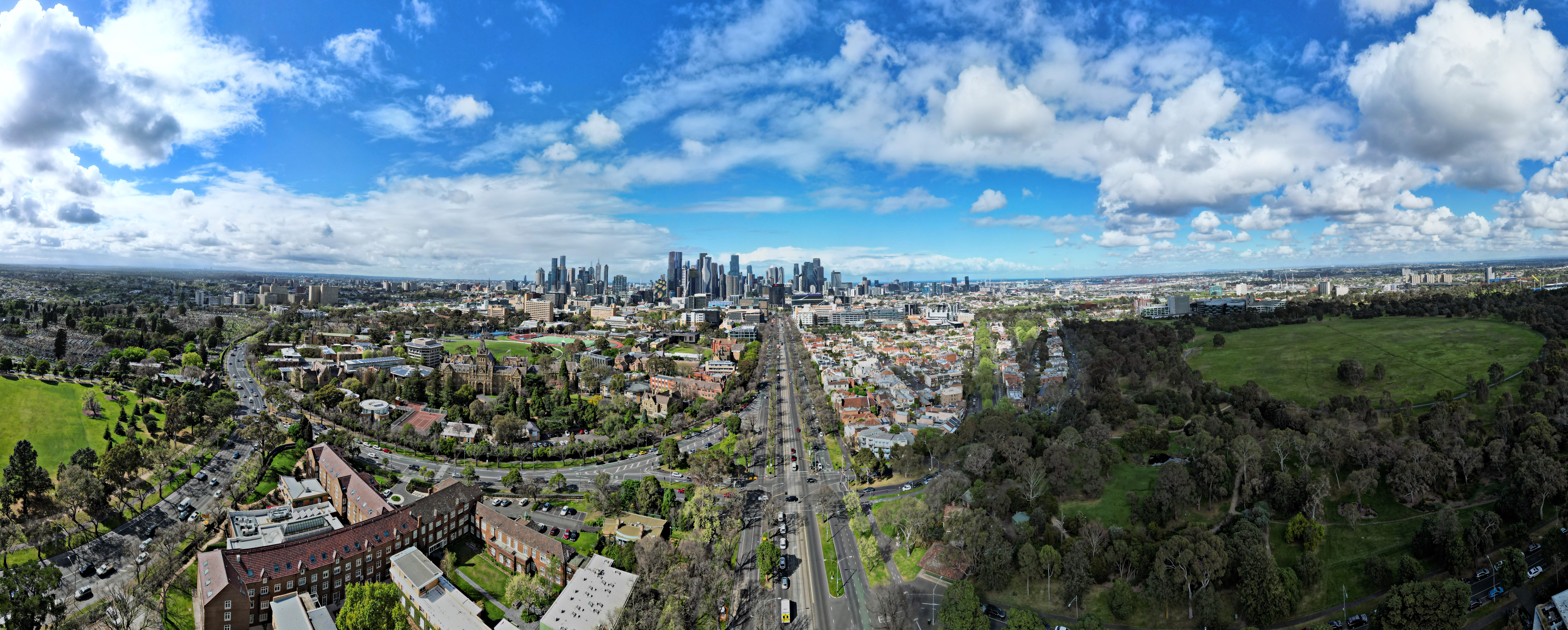
Aerial panorama of Melbourne's skyline from Parkville. September 2023.

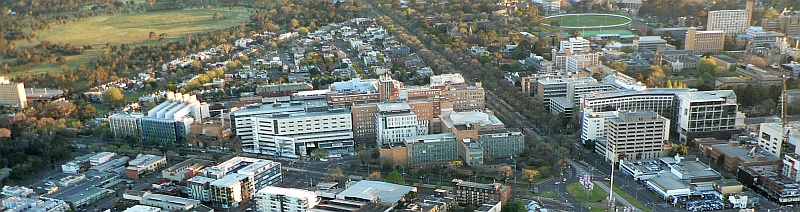
Aerial of Parkville looking north. Visible is Royal Park (top left); Royal Melbourne Hospital (centre left); Royal Parade (centre) and University of Melbourne campus (right).

In the 2016 census, there were 7,409 people in Parkville. 50.1% of people were born in Australia. The next most common countries of birth were China 7.1%, Malaysia 3.7%, England 2.7%, New Zealand 2.3% and India 2.2%. 58.2% of people only spoke English at home. Other languages spoken at home included Mandarin 9.1%, Cantonese 2.8%, Spanish 1.4% and Italian 1.4%. The most common response for religion was No Religion at 45.2%.

== Housing ==
The residential part of Parkville South, commenced in 1861, was listed as a Conservation Area under the Register of the National Estate and contains almost all of the suburb's housing.

== Educational institutions ==
Old Arts Building University of Melbourne

- University of Melbourne and associated residential colleges, including Queen's College, Melbourne and Ormond College.
- University High School
- Monash University Parkville Campus (formerly Victorian College of Pharmacy)
- Melbourne Youth Justice Centre, a youth corrections facility, is located in Parkville. Education is provided by Parkville College
- Ridley Melbourne - Mission & Ministry College

== Health and medical research institutions ==
- Royal Melbourne Hospital
- Royal Children's Hospital
- Royal Women's Hospital
- Commonwealth Serum Laboratories (CSL), where vaccines and medicines are discovered and produced.
- Walter and Eliza Hall Institute of Medical Research
- Murdoch Children's Research Institute
- Monash Institute of Pharmaceutical Science (MIPS) Part of Monash Universities Parkville Campus
- Victorian Comprehensive Cancer Centre, accommodating the relocated Peter MacCallum Cancer Centre that opened in 2016.

== Transport ==
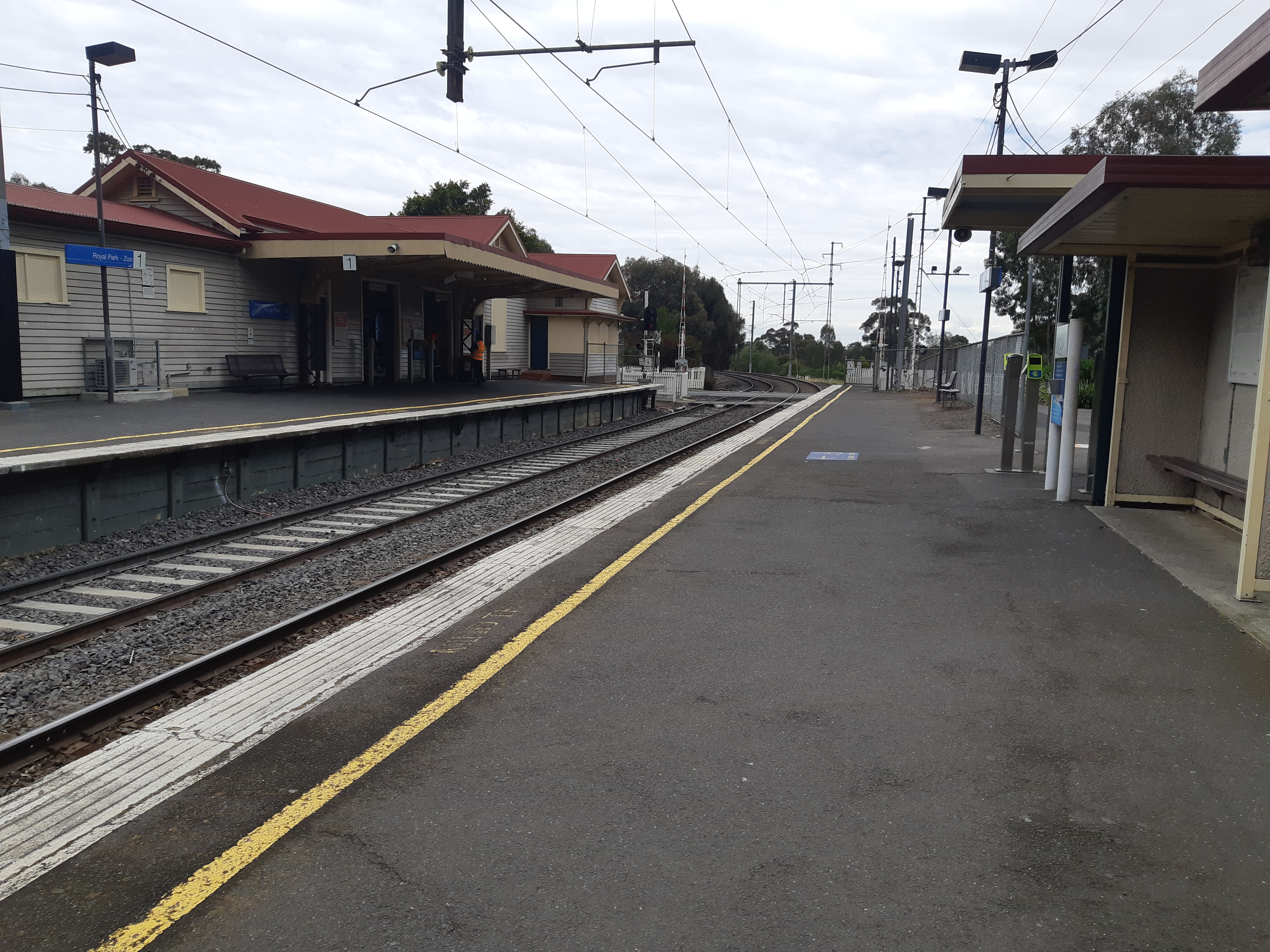
Royal Park railway station

=== Bus ===
Five bus routes service Parkville:

- 241 : North Melbourne station – Yarra Bend Park via University of Melbourne. Operated by Transit Systems Victoria.
- 402 : Footscray station – East Melbourne via North Melbourne. Operated by Transit Systems Victoria.
- 505 : Moonee Ponds Junction – University of Melbourne via Parkville Gardens. Operated by Dysons.
- 546 : Heidelberg station – Queen Victoria Market via Clifton Hill, Carlton and the University of Melbourne. Operated by Dysons.
- Night Bus 959 : Melbourne CBD (Queen Street) – Broadmeadows station via Niddrie and Airport West (operates Saturday and Sunday mornings only). Operated by Ventura Bus Lines.

=== Road ===
The main arterial road is Elizabeth Street, which becomes Royal Parade before becoming Sydney Road and the Hume Highway, the main highway heading towards Sydney.

=== Train ===
The primary station serving the area is the Parkville railway station, located on the southern boundary of the suburb, under Grattan Street, which was built as a part of the Melbourne Metro Rail Project and opened in late 2025.

Royal Park is another station serving the suburb, located in Royal Park to the north and adjacent to the Melbourne Zoo, and is on the Upfield line, serviced by Metro Trains Melbourne.

=== Tram ===
Twelve tram routes service Parkville, all operated by Yarra Trams:

- : East Coburg – South Melbourne Beach
- : Melbourne University – Malvern East
- : Melbourne University – Malvern
- : Moreland station – Glen Iris
- : Melbourne University – Kew
- : Coburg North – Flinders Street station
- : West Maribyrnong – Flinders Street station
- : West Coburg – Toorak
- : Airport West – Flinders Street station
- : Melbourne University – Brighton East
- : Melbourne University – Carnegie
- : Melbourne University – Camberwell

The Melbourne University Tram Stop is a major terminus for seven tram routes that operate along Swanston Street.

== Parks and open space ==
=== Royal Park ===
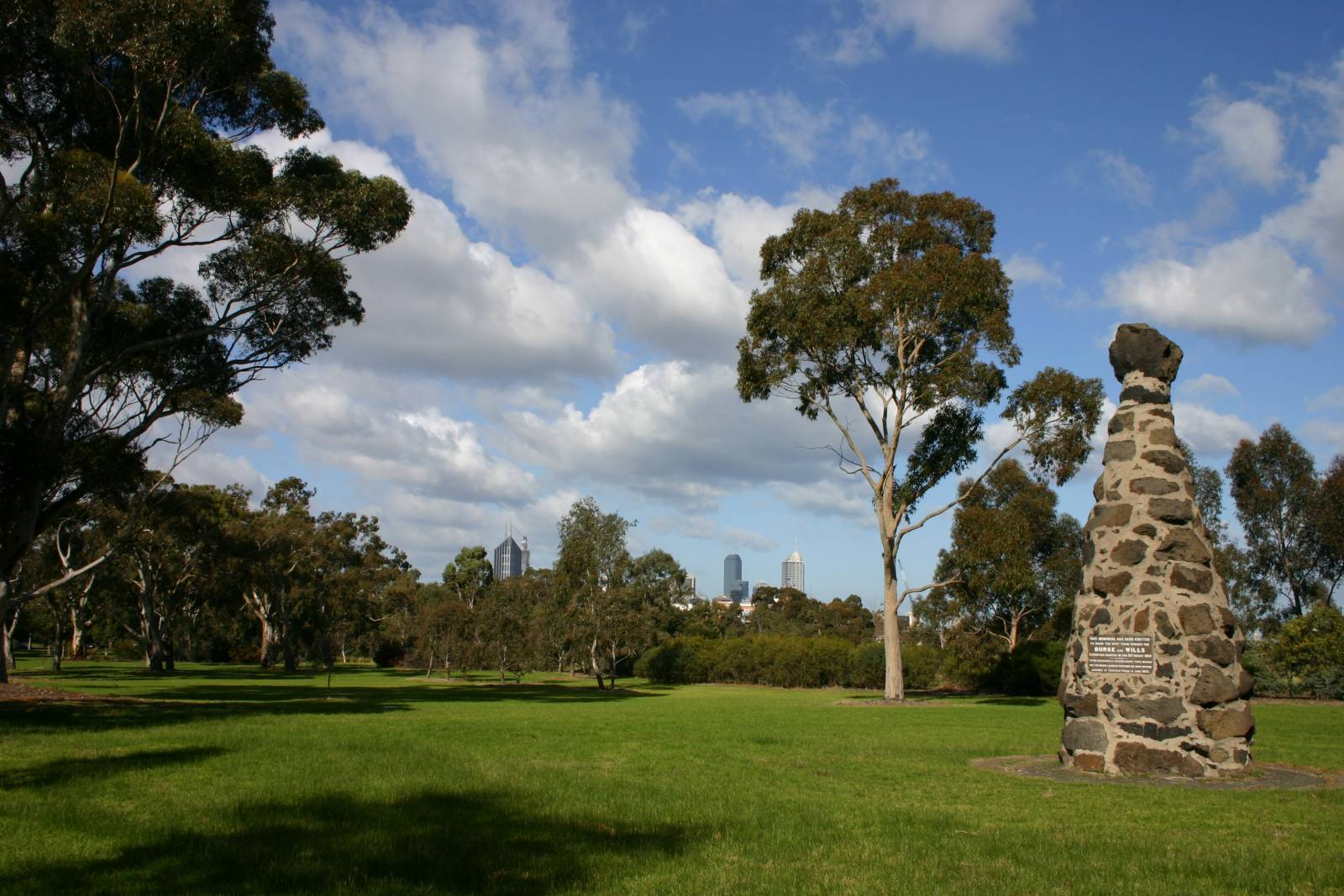
Royal Park

Royal Park, which Parkville was named after, is the largest of Melbourne's inner city parks (181 hectares) and is home to the Royal Melbourne Zoological Gardens. The park is home to a wide range of sports and wildlife. Royal Park is home to the Parkville District Cricket Club, who are based at Brens Pavilion.

Royal Park Golf Course is north of the Zoological Gardens.

== See also ==
- City of Brunswick – Parts of Parkville were previously within this former local government area.
