= Earless water rat =

Conservation status
- Least Concern (IUCN 3.1)

Scientific classification
- Kingdom: Animalia
- Phylum: Chordata
- Class: Mammalia
- Order: Rodentia
- Family: Muridae
- Subfamily: Murinae
- Tribe: Hydromyini
- Genus: Crossomys; Thomas, 1907
- Species: C. moncktoni

Binomial name
- Crossomys moncktoni Thomas, 1907
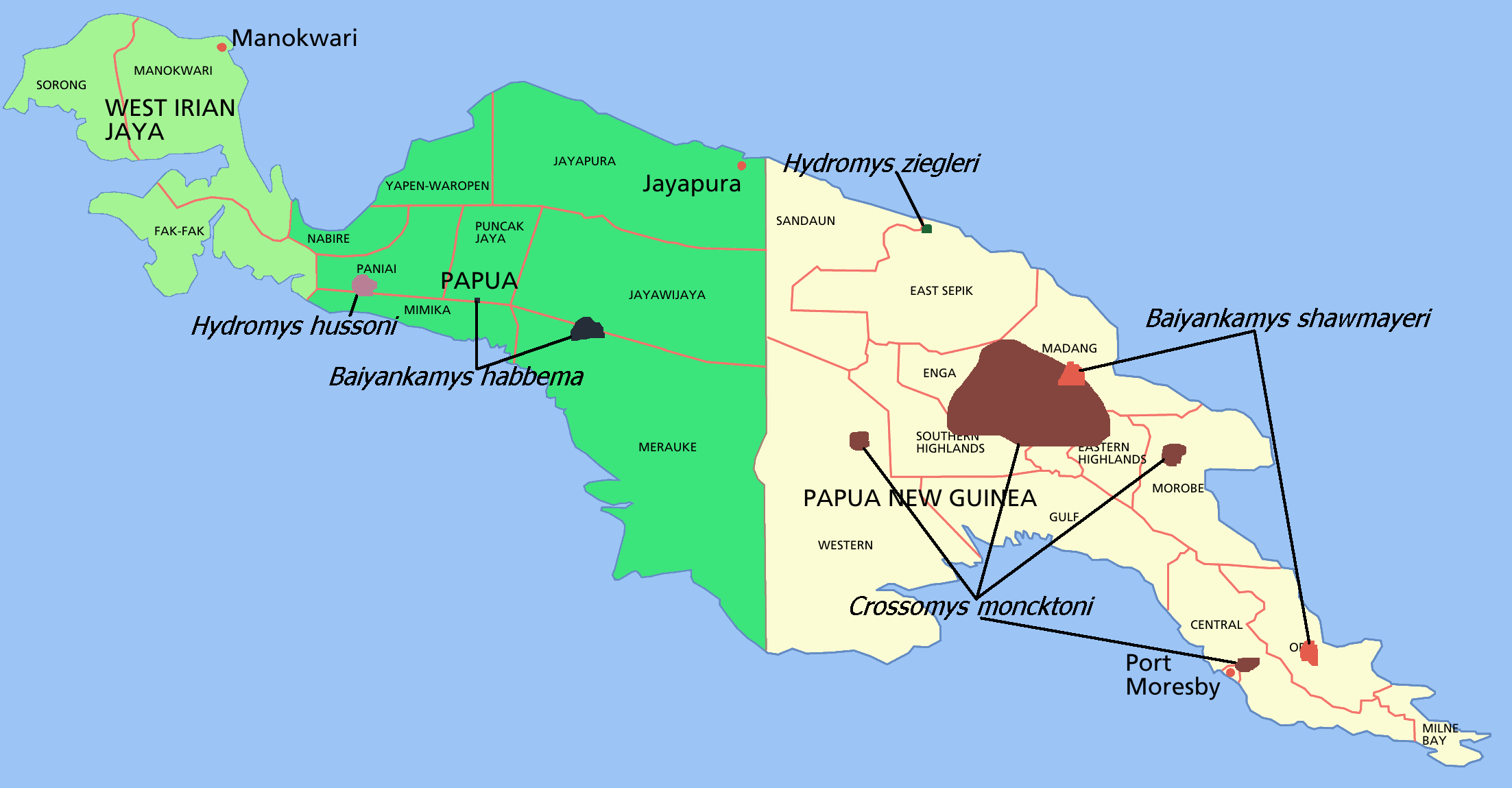
- Distribution of the earless water rat and related species.

Species of rodent

The earless water rat (Crossomys moncktoni) is a New Guinea rodent, part of the Hydromys group of the subfamily of Old World rats and mice (Murinae). It is the only species in the genus Crossomys. This species is probably most closely related to Baiyankamys. It is still unclear to which species this group is related. It is one of the most aquatically adapted rodents of the world.

== Names ==
It is known as kuypep in the Kalam language of Papua New Guinea.

== History of discovery ==
This animal was first described in 1907 by the British mammalogist Oldfield Thomas, based on a single specimen caught by one Mr. C. A. W. Monckton, after whom the species was named, near Brown River, Central Province, south-east Papua New Guinea. Only in July 1950 a second specimen was captured. Since then, several other examples have been caught in the mountains of eastern New Guinea, but the earless water rat remains a rather rare species. The scientific name means "Monckton's fringed mouse", which refers to the collector of the original specimen (C. A. W. Monckton) and to the fringe of hairs on the tail.

== Relationships ==
The German mammalogist Hans Rümmler placed this rodent (and Parahydromys asper) in Hydromys, but that has not been accepted generally. Lidicker (1968), who studies the morphology of the phallus of New Guinea rodents, speculated that Crossomys might not be as closely related to Hydromys as was then generally thought. Later on, this was supported by the immunological study of Watts & Baverstock (1994). This study placed Crossomys closer to Leptomys, Pseudohydromys and Xeromys than to Hydromys.

The American mammalogists Guy Musser and Michael Carleton, in their contribution to the authoritative Mammal Species of the World (3rd ed.), divided the group of murine rodents that had before been called "Hydromyinae" or "Hydromyini" in two "divisions": the Xeromys Division (Leptomys, Pseudohydromys and Xeromys) and the Hydromys Division (Crossomys, Hydromys, Microhydromys, Paraleptomys and Parahydromys [Baiyankamys was added later]). According to them, the morphology of Crossomys is more like the Hydromys Division than the Xeromys Division, and therefore they placed it in the Hydromys group. They supported their opinion with an unpublished study of the Australian biologist Ken Aplin, who also placed Crossomys closer to Hydromys.

Helgen (2005) concluded that Crossomys is most closely related to Baiyankamys, which had usually been placed in Hydromys before. Baiyankamys has not been studied genetically. According to his data, the Crossomys-Baiyankamys group is most closely related to Hydromys and Parahydromys, though he did not give material to support his opinion.

== Characteristics ==
The earless water rat is adapted best to a life in water out of all the muroids. It has extremely long hindfeet, the toes of which are webbed completely, strongly reduced forelegs, absent or invisible ears, very small eyes, and a long tail with a row of hairs at the downside. That row starts at each side of the beginning of the tail as a long white row of hairs; these two rows merge at about 50 mm from the beginning of the tail and the row goes on to the end of the tail. In all these characters, it resembles the elegant water shrew (Nectogale elegans), a good example of convergent evolution.

The back is greyish brown, and the belly is white. The fur is soft and waterproof. The top half of the tail is light grey, and the bottom half is white. The forefeet and claws are very small, but the hindfeet are very large. The upper lip contains a row of short, strong brushes, which may be used for rasping. The external ear (the pinna) is reduced to a small oval that does not or hardly protract above the fur. It is possible that the ear canal can be closed. The brain is rather large, like in many aquatic animals. The nasals are relatively small, just like the palate and the molars. The bullae are small. The rostrum is narrow. The earless water rat is a medium-sized rat, about as large as its close relative Baiyankamys. The head-body length is 175 to 200 mm (6.9 to 7.9 in) (based on four specimens), tail length is 212 to 260 mm (8.3 to 10.2 in) (4), hind foot length is 44 to 53 mm (1.7 to 2.1 in) (4), ear length is 1 to 45 mm (0.039 to 1.772 in) (2), and weight 165 g (5.8 ounce avoirdupois) (1). Females have 0+2=4 mammae (no thoracic and two inguinal pairs), the same number as most other Australasian rodents.

The earless water rat and Baiyankamys are related because they share the following characters: tail much longer than head-body length; soft, thick, greyish dorsal coat; long, narrow rostrum with a narrow top; very narrow canines; very narrow mesopterygoid fossae; narrow zygomatic arches with a high squamosal root. B. habbema also has the reduced external ears of the earless water rat.

== Distribution, habitat and behavior ==
This animal lives at 1000 to 2700 meters in elevation in Central Cordillera of Papua New Guinea, including the Huon peninsula. The cold, fast-flowing streams of the mountains are its habitat.

During the day it is actively hunting for tadpoles, worms, and river insects (mostly larvae), but at night it sleeps in holes along the river bank. The animal gets only one young at the same time. It is only captured by Telefol hunters when river levels are low.

It is called kwypep by the Kalam tribe (Madang Province), possibly ogoyam in the Telefol language (in Sandaun Province) and momo by the Rofaifo (Southern Highlands Province), although that name is also used for other water rats, like the common Rakali. Some local names can be translated as "water sugar glider", which refers to the similarity of the fur of these two species.

Little is known about the conservation status of this species, although it has the status "least concern" in the IUCN Red List.
