= MREAM =

Former community arts organisation in Melbourne, Australia

The Maribyrnong River Edge Art Movement (MREAM) was a community arts organisation in Melbourne, Australia.

== History ==
The Maribyrnong River Edge Art Movement was established in 1988 by a co-operative of Western Suburbs of Melbourne artists. MREAM obtained the use of a disused industrial building from the City of Footscray which had been compulsorily acquired as part a proposed urban renewal project on the banks of the Maribyrnong River. The group produced its first guide to studio spaces and

MREAM began working from a building in Moreland Street Footscray in the 1980s, where a vibrant arts community developed around the Footscray Community Arts Centre. When the area began to be gentrified in a common process where artists led the revitalisation of run-down and therefore cheap rental areas in inner cities, the organisation was forced out of the building in 2008. They then moved to Pipemakers Park in Maribyrnong, where the group used space in the historic bluestone buildings there to establish studio and exhibition space. However, these buildings were under lease to Melbourne's Living Museum of the West, which had a long-term lease from Parks Victoria, and despite an attempt to place their own representatives on the committee of management of the Living Museum in 2011, they were subsequently evicted from the building.

MREAM continued as a loose coalition, although was not particularly active in 2012–3. Some exhibitions were staged under the banner "Mream in Exile" in 2012.
