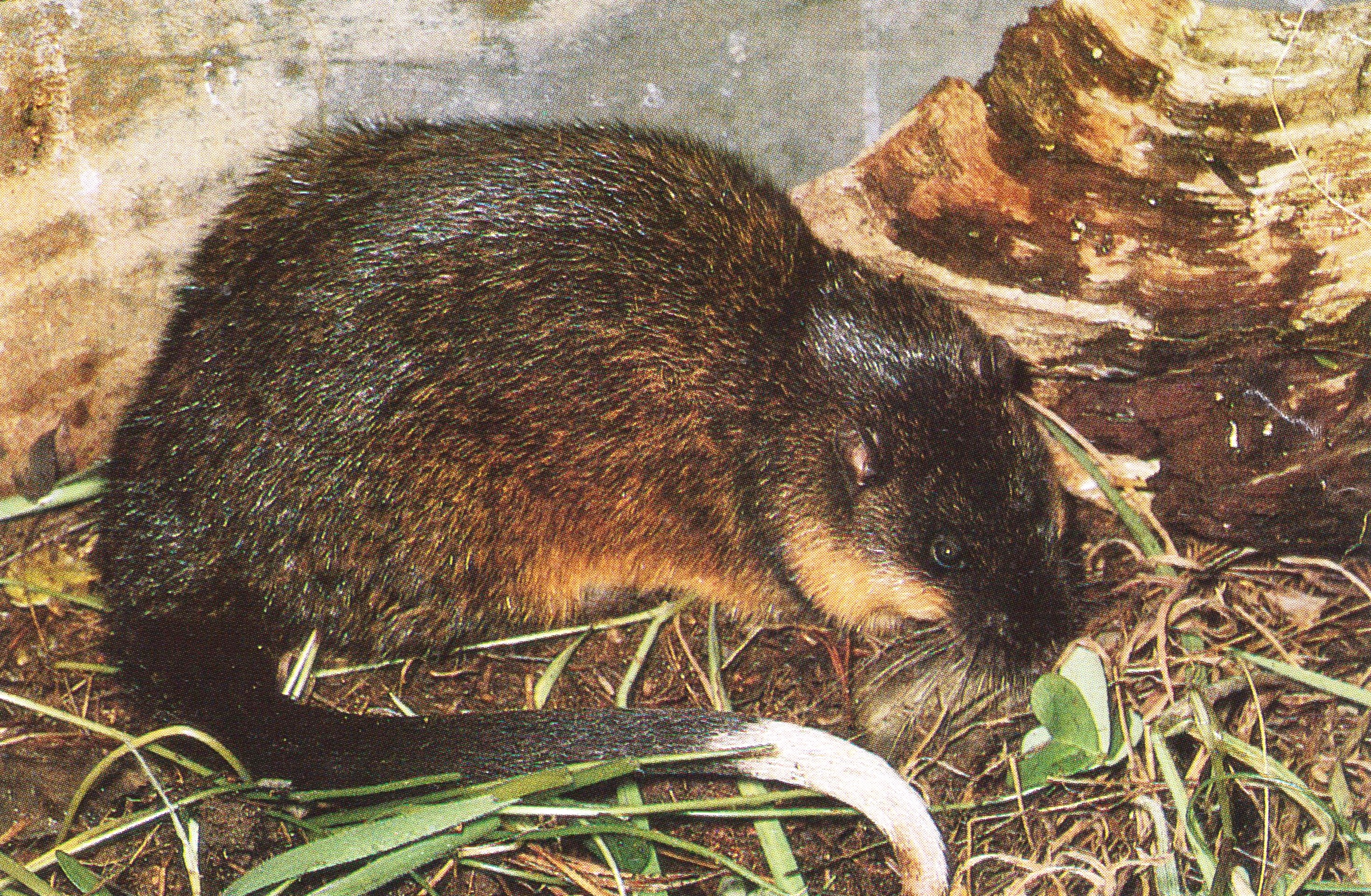
- Rakali (Hydromys chrysogaster)

Scientific classification
- Domain: Eukaryota
- Kingdom: Animalia
- Phylum: Chordata
- Class: Mammalia
- Order: Rodentia
- Family: Muridae
- Tribe: Hydromyini
- Genus: Hydromys; É. Geoffroy, 1804

Type species
- Hydromys chrysogaster É. Geoffroy, 1804

Species
- Hydromys chrysogaster Hydromys hussoni Hydromys neobritannicus Hydromys ziegleri
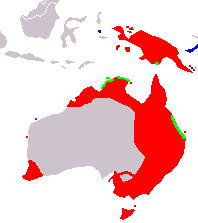
- red=Hydromys chrysogaster green=Xeromys sp. and Hydromys chrysogaster blue= Hydromys spp.

= Hydromys =

Hydromys Temporal range: Middle Pliocene - Recent

Genus of rodents

Hydromys is a genus of semiaquatic rodents in the subfamily Murinae. Three species are endemic to New Guinea and nearby islands. The fourth species, the rakali, is also found on Australia. The most recently discovered member of this genus was described in 2005.

== List of species ==
Genus Hydromys - water rats:

- Rakali, Hydromys chrysogaster E. Geoffroy, 1804
- Western water rat, Hydromys hussoni Musser and Piik, 1982
- New Britain water rat, Hydromys neobritannicus Tate and Archbold, 1935
- Ziegler's water rat, Hydromys ziegleri Helgen, 2005

Note: Hydromys habbema Tate and Archbold, 1941 and Hydromys shawmayeri (Hinton, 1943) are placed within Baiyankamys after Helgen, 2005.
