= Baiyankamys =

Scientific classification
- Domain: Eukaryota
- Kingdom: Animalia
- Phylum: Chordata
- Class: Mammalia
- Order: Rodentia
- Family: Muridae
- Tribe: Hydromyini
- Genus: Baiyankamys; Hinton, 1943

Species
- Baiyankamys habbema Baiyankamys shawmayeri

Genus of rodents

Baiyankamys is a genus of amphibious murid rodents. It was originally described, along with the species Baiyankamys shawmayeri by Hinton in 1943 after he found the remains of a single individual in south east of the Bismarck Mountain Range, north east New Guinea. Tate, in 1951 and, Laurie and Hill in 1954, confirmed the existence of both the species and genus.

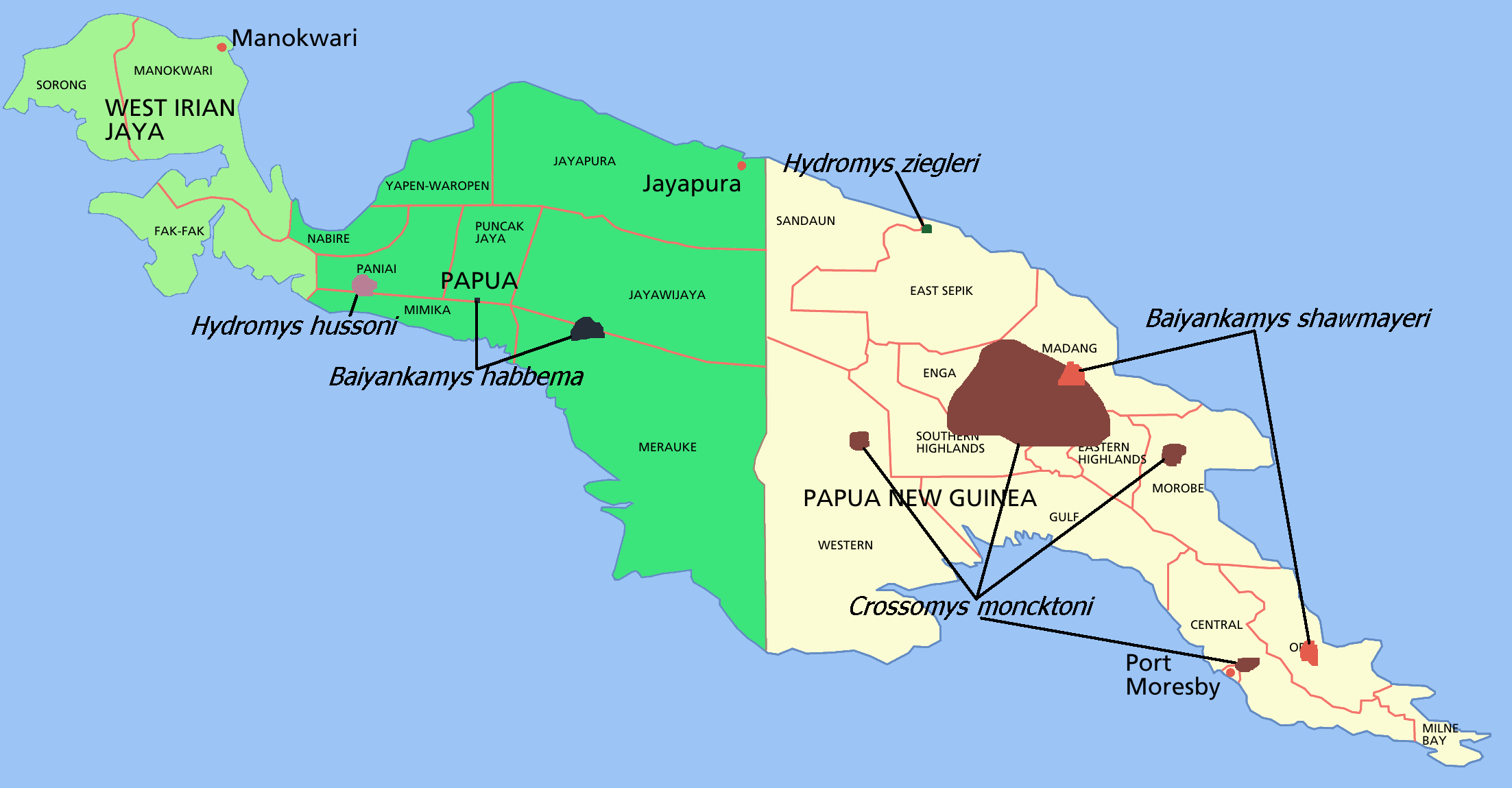
Distribution of the murine rodent genera Baiyankamys, Crossomys and Hydromys (except for the widespread Hydromys chrysogaster) on New Guinea

== Classification ==
Hinton described Baiyankamys as similar in appearance to the species Hydromys habbema but differed due to its unreduced pinnae and its lower teeth. It was described as having three lower molars on both sides of the lower jaw, whereas other genera of amphibious murines in New Guinea have only two.

In 1968 Mahoney discovered that the specimen of B. shawmayeri was a composite resulting from an incorrectly associated mandible of the species Rattus niobe and the skull of a small water rat. When the correct mandible was found in the BMNH collections Mahoney proposed that, based on their similarity B. shawmayeri should be classified as a synonym of H. habbema. However, Musser and Carleton (1993, 2005) and Flannery (1995) later proposed that the species Hinton described should be classified as Hydromys shawmayeri, closely related but distinct from H. habbema, based on the fact that they are easily distinguished by external and cranial traits,.

In 2005 Helgen proposed that generic name of Baiyankamys be used for shawmayeri and habbema, removing them both from the genus Hydromys. This was due to morphological differences in phallic anatomy, and many external and craniodental traits.

== Appearance ==
Baiyankamys is distinguished by soft, dense, frosted grey upperparts; a tail that is longer than its head-body length; a long, narrow snout, and extremely narrow incisors.

== Habitat ==
Baiyankamys habbema is found in a small region of the upper montane forests of the Snow Mountains of western New Guinea, between 2800 and 3600 m. Baiyankamys shawmayeri is found in lower to upper montane forests between 1500 and 2600 m in eastern and central highlands regions of Papua New Guinea.
