= Ziegler's water rat =

Conservation status
- Data Deficient (IUCN 3.1)

Scientific classification
- Kingdom: Animalia
- Phylum: Chordata
- Class: Mammalia
- Order: Rodentia
- Family: Muridae
- Genus: Hydromys
- Species: H. ziegleri

Binomial name
- Hydromys ziegleri Helgen, 2005

Species of rodent

Ziegler's water rat (Hydromys ziegleri), described in the mid-2000s, is a semiaquatic species of rodent native to the mountains Papua New Guinea of which little is known.

== Research and history ==
It was described in 2005 by K. Helgen, and later was assessed by Helgen, and A. Allison in 2008. The water rat was named in honor of the deceased Dr. Alan C. Ziegler from the Bishop Museum. It has been rated as data deficient for the purposes of the IUCN Red List because insufficient is known about the creature's population range, threats, and numbers. Only two specimens have ever been recorded by scientists. The water rat may be threatened by logging of its forest habitat but more research is needed to codify this theory. It is also believed it may inhabit the northern slopes of its mountain home but study is needed to determine this as fact.

== Habitat ==
This species inhabits both terrestrial and freshwater systems. This includes forests, subtropical and tropical moist lowland forests, inland wetlands, permanent watercourses, and artificial terrestrial areas. The animal has only been recorded in Bainyik, located on the south slopes of the Prince Alexander Mountains at an elevation of 200 metres (660 ft). The rat has been found to live in creeks and rivers in low lying tropical rain forests but it may also live in higher elevations.
