= Western water rat =

Conservation status
- Data Deficient (IUCN 3.1)

Scientific classification
- Kingdom: Animalia
- Phylum: Chordata
- Class: Mammalia
- Order: Rodentia
- Family: Muridae
- Genus: Hydromys
- Species: H. hussoni

Binomial name
- Hydromys hussoni Musser & Piik, 1982

Species of rodent

The western water rat (Hydromys hussoni) is a semiaquatic species of rodent in the family Muridae. It is found in West Papua, Indonesia and Papua New Guinea. It is threatened by habitat loss however a lot is still unknown about the species and it has been classified as Data Deficient on the IUCN Red List.
