= Pipemakers Park =

Park in Melbourne, Victoria, Australia

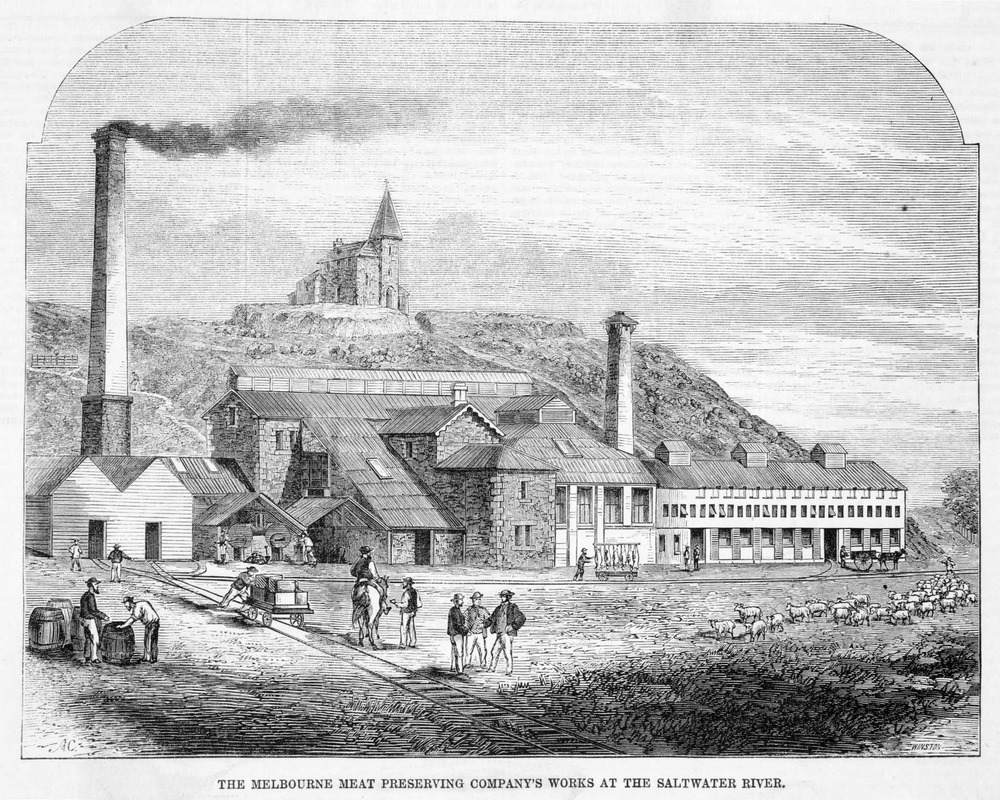
- Meat preserving on Saltwater River, Pipemakers Park, undated

- Location within Melbourne
- Interactive map of Pipemakers Park
- Type: Urban park
- Location: Maribyrnong, Melbourne, Victoria, Australia
- Coordinates: 37°46′37″S 144°53′42″E
- Area: 8 ha (20 acres)
- Opened: 1987; 39 years ago
- Founder: Melbourne & Metropolitan Board of Works
- Etymology: Former pipe works
- Operator: City of Maribyrnong (since 2014); Parks Victoria (1987–2014)
- Status: Open
- Paths: Sealed paths
- Terrain: Remnant riparian bushland
- Water: Maribyrnong River, artificial wetlands
- Vegetation: Australian native
- Parking: available
- Public transit: – Craigieburn, Sunbury, Werribee; –, – 6, 223, 406, 409, 468, 408; – Maribyrnong River Trail
- Landmarks: Melbourne's Living Museum of the West; Public art sculpture
- Facilities: Barbecues; conference room; ecomuseum; picnic areas; playground; toilets; wildlife sanctuary
- Website: maribyrnong.vic.gov.au

Victorian Heritage Register
- Official name: Pipemakers Park Complex
- Type: Registered place
- Criteria: A, C, D
- Designated: 20 August 1982
- Reference no.: H1503
- Category: Manufacturing and Processing
- Heritage overlay no.: HO64

The Pipemakers Park (Note: Sometimes spelled as "Pipemaker's Park".) is an 8-hectare (20-acre) urban park located in Maribyrnong, an inner western suburb of Melbourne, in Victoria, Australia. The park is situated on the western bank of the Maribyrnong River, near the Highpoint Shopping Centre. Established in 1987, the park was created on the site of a former pipe works and meat preserving company, and retains historic buildings adapted as Melbourne's Living Museum of the West and interpreted industrial ruins.

The park forms part of the Pipemakers Park Complex, a former manufacturing site that consists of three historic bluestone buildings and other structures. The complex was added to the Victorian Heritage Register on 20 August 1982, in advance of the park's establishment, due to its historical, archaeological and architectural significance.

Established by the Melbourne & Metropolitan Board of Works, the park was initially managed by Parks Victoria, and has been managed, since 2014, by the City of Maribyrnong as one parkland, together with the adjacent Burton Crescent Reserve, located to the north along the Maribyrnong River, Frogs Hollow Wetlands, located to the south, and the Thompson Reserve, located to the west. The park is located on the traditional lands of the Marin Balluk people.

== Description ==
Joseph Raleigh established a boiling down works on the banks of the river in the 1840s. The original 1940s buildings were adapted to the Melbourne Meat Preserving Company works in 1868, and then taken over by Hume Pipes in c. 1911 for the manufacture of concrete pipes. Hume Pipes closed the factory in 1978 and the site was purchased by the Melbourne & Metropolitan Board of Works.

The site was cleaned up, with stabilisation and preservation works undertaken and one of the buildings refurbished and leased to the Living Museum of the West that was opened in 1984. A $2 million Bicentennial grant in 1987 enabled further development of the Living Museum. The area was declared a parkland in 1987. In 1995, one of the factories was converted into an interpretative garden called the History of the Land Discovery Trail and retains some features including tramways, concrete chutes, repurposed pipes, and parts of the original concrete slab.

The park sits on the floodplain of the Maribyrnong River below a steep escarpment of the Western Basalt Plains.

A 8-metre-high (26 ft) and 12-metre-wide (39 ft) sculpture by Matthew Harding is located in the park. Called Pipedreams, it was made from fabricated marine grade stainless steel.

== See also ==
- Parks and gardens of Melbourne
- Melbourne's Living Museum of the West
- Heritage gardens in Australia
- List of places on the Victorian Heritage Register in the City of Maribyrnong
