= Maribyrnong River =

River in Melbourne, Victoria, Australia

Maribyrnong Salt Water River
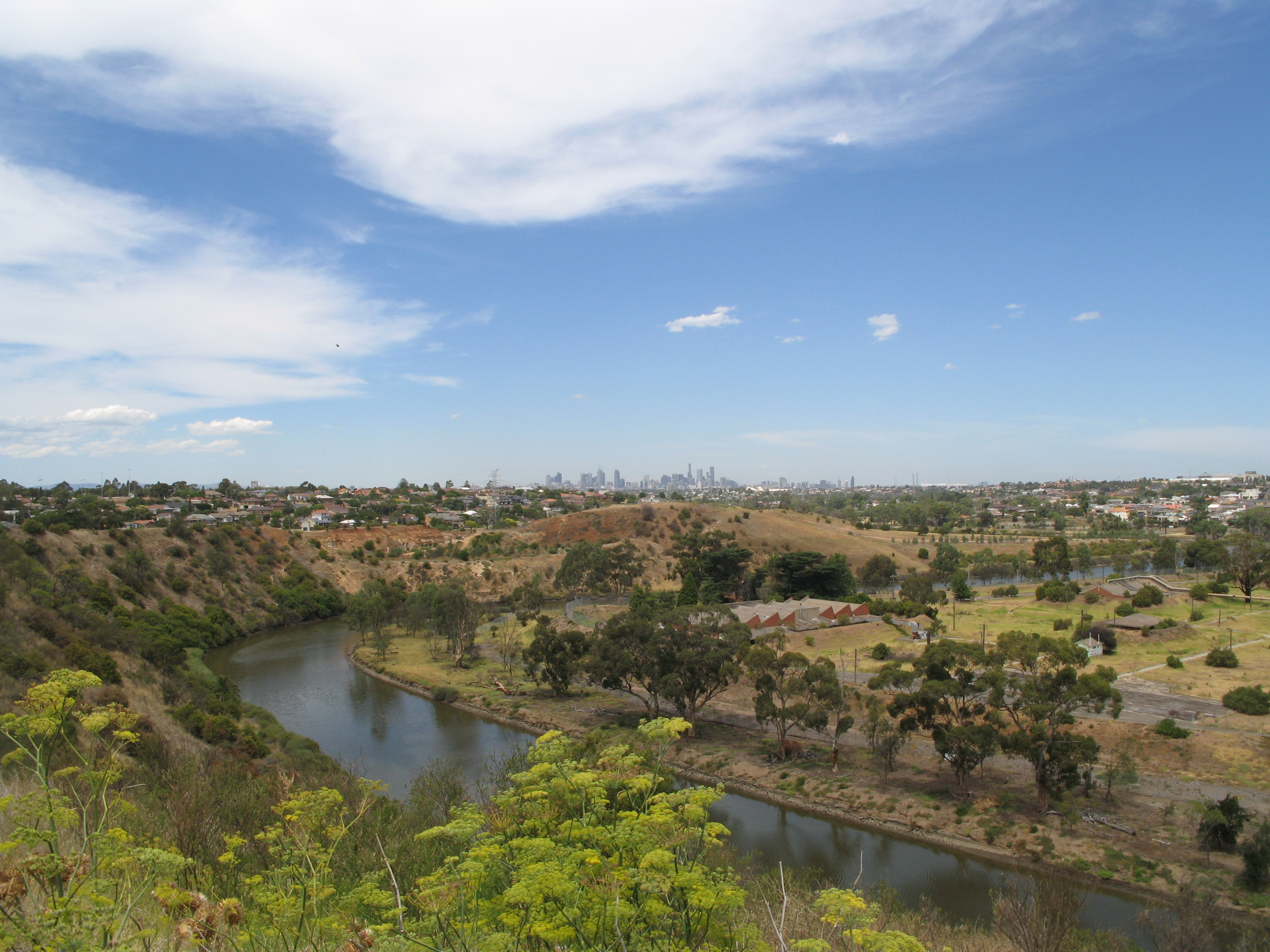
- The Maribyrnong River as it flows past the Melbourne suburb of Essendon West

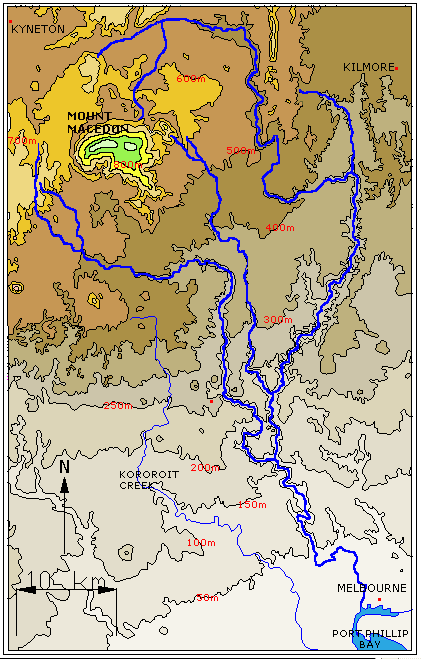
- Contour map of the river basin
- Etymology: ringtail possum
- Native name: Mareingalk (Woiwurrung); Mirrangbamurn (Woiwurrung)

Location
- Country: Australia
- State: Victoria
- Region: North–western Melbourne
- City: Melbourne

Physical characteristics
- Source: Macedon Ranges, Great Dividing Range
- Source confluence: Deep and Jackson Creeks
  - location: Taylors Lakes
  - coordinates: 37°40′10″S 144°48′17″E
  - elevation: 42 m (138 ft)
- Mouth: confluence with the Yarra River
  - location: Yarraville
  - coordinates: 37°49′14″S 144°54′25″E
  - elevation: 0.2 m (7.9 in)
- Length: 40 km (25 mi)
- Basin size: 1,450 km^{2} (560 sq mi)

Basin features
- River system: Port Phillip catchment

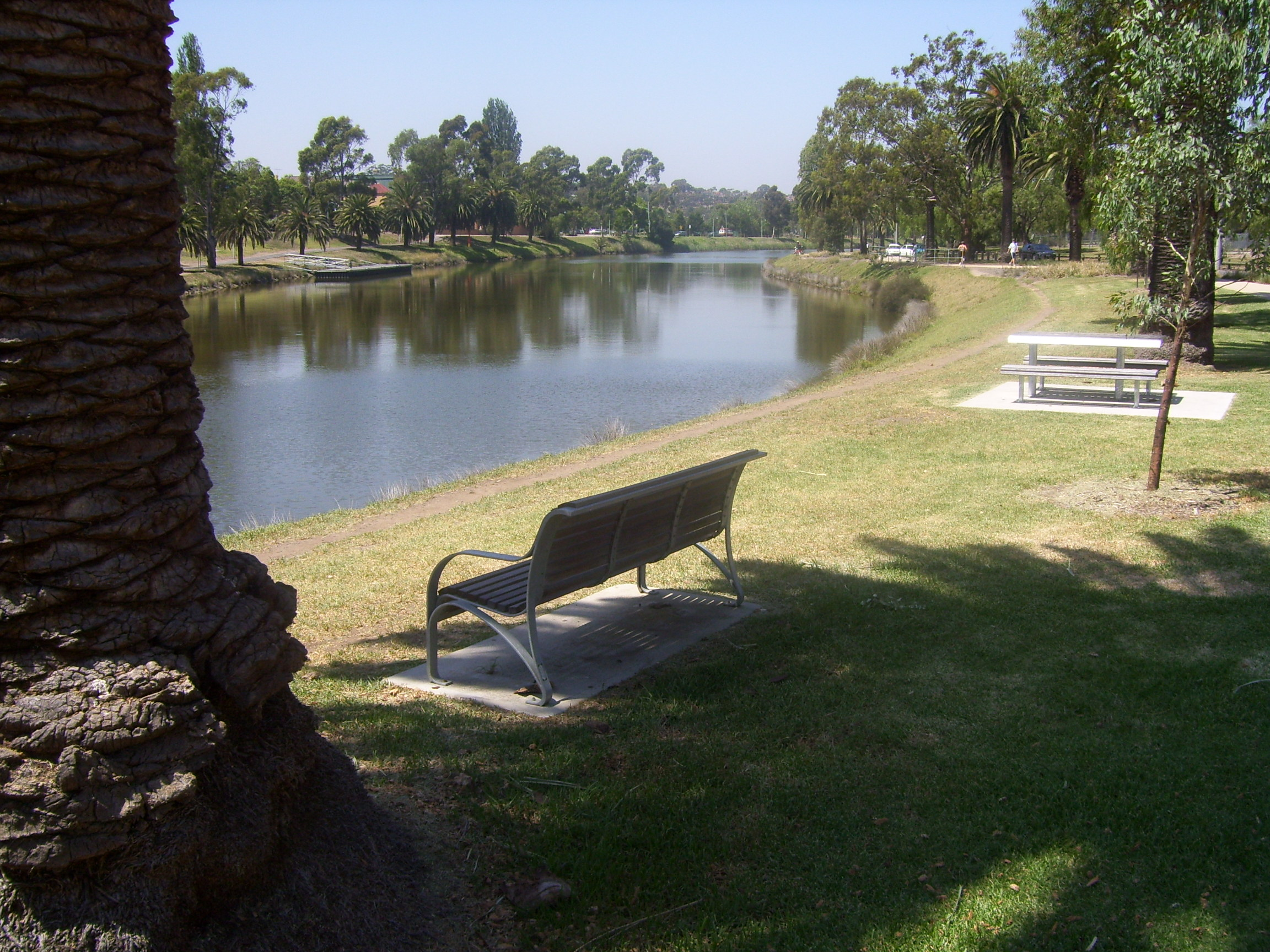
Maribyrnong River in the suburb of Maribyrnong

The Maribyrnong River /ˈmærəbənɒŋ/ is a perennial river of the Port Phillip catchment, in the north–western suburbs of Melbourne, in the Australian state of Victoria.

== Course ==
The Maribyrnong River draws its headwaters from near Mount Macedon within the Macedon Ranges, part of the Great Dividing Range. Formed by the confluence of the Jackson Creek and the Deep Creek below Taylors Lakes, the river flows generally southward, joined by two minor tributaries before reaching its confluence with the Yarra River at Yarraville, to eventually empty into Port Phillip. The river descends 42 metres (138 ft) over its 40-kilometre (25 mi) course.

=== Headwaters ===
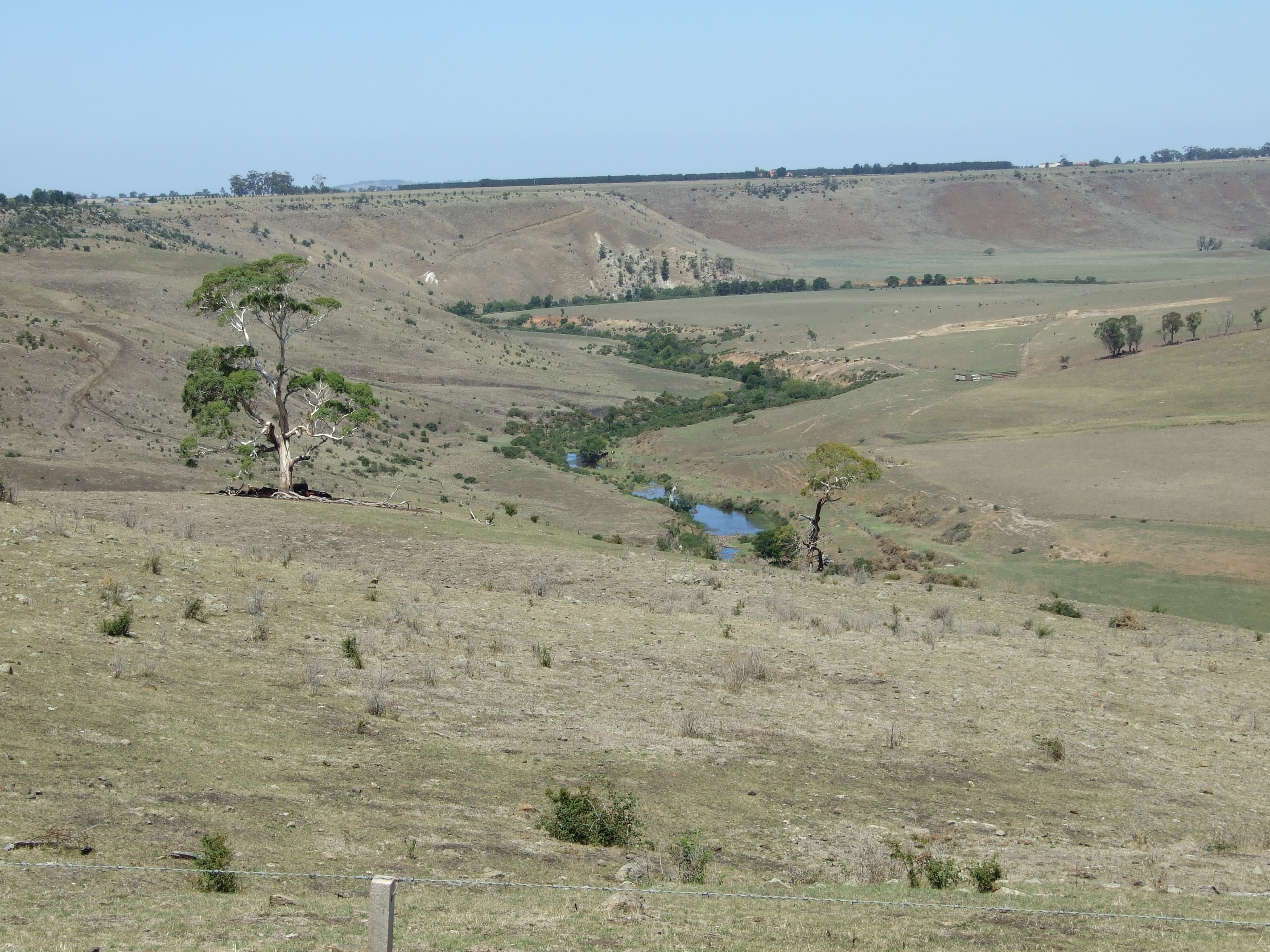
Jackson Creek, a tributary of the Maribyrnong River at Clarkefield

The head of the Maribyrnong catchment is situated in the Macedon Ranges region of central Victoria around 60 kilometres (37 mi) northwest of Melbourne City Centre. Various creeks beginning in the southern Mount Macedon area flow into Riddells Creek which in turn flows into the Jackson Creek. The Jackson Creek starts its journey northwest of Gisborne, 50 kilometres (31 mi) north of Melbourne CBD. The other major tributary of the Maribyrnong is Deep Creek, which also has its headwaters in the northern and eastern parts of the Macedon Ranges. The creek has cut a deep valley through the surrounding basalt plains in its southward course, in particular as it flows through localities such as Konagaderra and Bulla. To the west of Melbourne Airport the tributaries of the Jackson Creek and the Deep Creek conjoin to form the Maribyrnong River. The Organ Pipes National Park can be found adjacent to the Jackson Creek, near the Calder Freeway, with picnic facilities and a prominent display of basaltic columns, a geological formation, so named because they look like organ pipes. Swimming occurs in these upper reaches of the river, but is not recommended.

=== Middle reaches ===
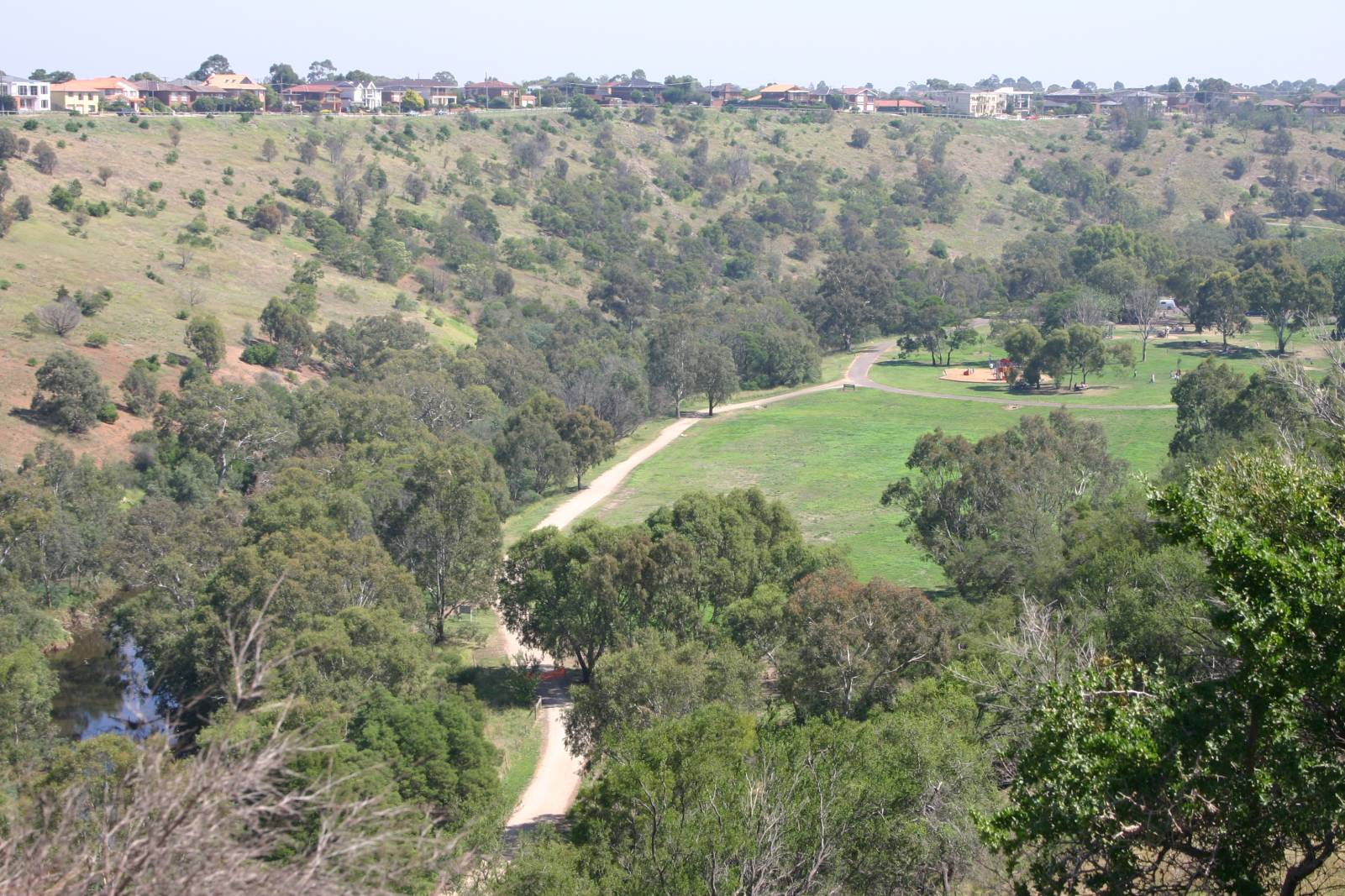
Maribyrnong River at Brimbank Park

The river flows south and west. At Keilor the river winds back on itself in a giant horseshoe bend, before winding south again at Brimbank Park. Here the river flows 55 metres (180 ft) below the western plains. Brimbank Park forms a huge amphitheatre in the bend in the river with picnic areas, cycle and walking trails, and a café, that is usually busy on weekends and holidays. The area is rich in birdlife and native fauna. The Maribyrnong River Trail shared path starts at Brimbank Park, following mostly beside the river to near its confluence with the Yarra River in Footscray. At Avondale Heights and Essendon West residents have views over the river valley to the skyscrapers of the Melbourne CBD. Up until this area, the Maribyrnong is unusual in being one of the few large basaltic streams in Victoria. The Maribyrnong is a freshwater river as far downstream as Solomon's Ford, Avondale Heights. Swimming in the river is not permitted downstream of the Canning Street bridge in Avondale Heights.

=== Lower reaches ===
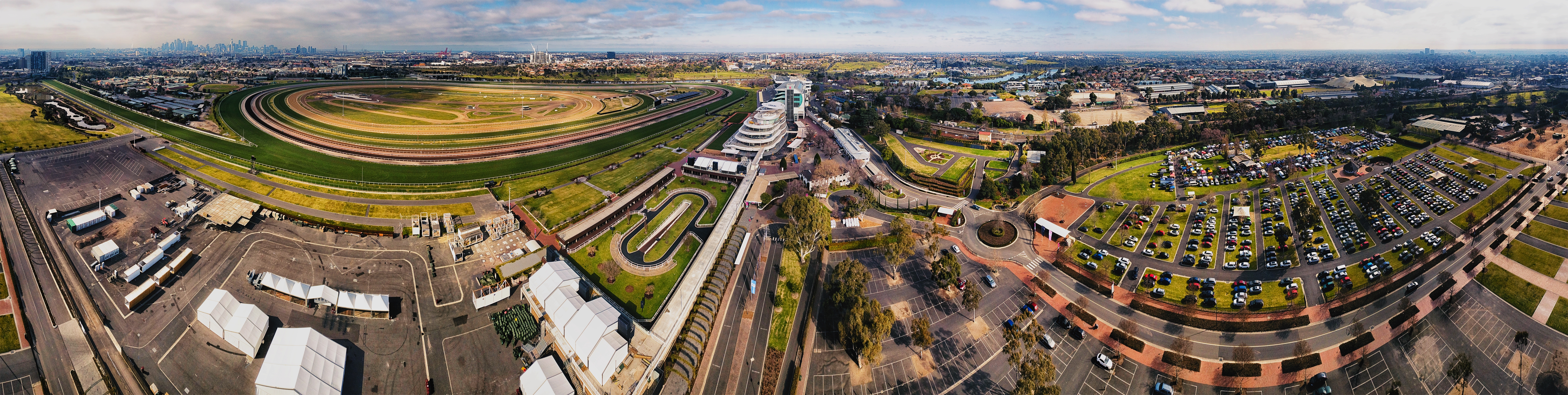
Aerial panorama of Flemington Racecourse along the Maribyrnong, 2018

The river becomes estuarine as it flows through Avondale Heights. At Maribyrnong, Melbourne's Living Museum of the West presents information on the history of the river and the early industrial history of the site. Dolphins are sometimes sighted in the lower reaches of the river, along with many water birds, especially at Burndap Park. Footscray Park opposite the Flemington Racecourse is only metres down river from Pipemakers Park and Burndap Park, the river then meanders across the floodplain to its juncture with the Yarra River at Yarraville. The water quality of these estuarine reaches of the river is poor. Sediments show considerable pollution from past industrial activities and sewage discharge from the 20th century. Today, swimming is not recommended due to exposure to untreated sewage in run-off from these heavily urbanised areas.

== Geography ==
The geographic features and tributaries of the river are listed below, tributaries in bold:

- Yarraville Wharves
- Maribyrnong Berth
- Newells Paddock Wetlands
- Burndap Lakes
- Jacks Canal
- Frogs Hollow Wetland
- Cliffs
- **Steele or Rose Creek**
- Grimes Flat
- Kulin Wetlands
- **Taylors Creek**
- Horseshoe Bend
- Gumms Corner
- **Arundel Creek**
- **Jackson Creek / Deep Creek**

== Etymology ==
The river was initially named Saltwater River by early settlers, due to the tidal nature of its lower reaches. The name Maribyrnong however, is derived from mirring-gnay-bir-nong which in Woiwurrung, the language of the local Wurundjeri people, is said to mean "I can hear a ringtail possum" or "saltwater river" (Gunung or Gunnung is Woiwurrung for river, as seen in the names of other watercourses in the area, such as; Koonung Creek and Birrarung).

Marriburnong is an alternate spelling listed on a map dated from 1840.

The inner western and north-western suburbs of Melbourne are located in the vicinity of the Maribyrnong River and the river has given its name to the suburb of Maribyrnong and the local government area, the City of Maribyrnong.

== History ==
The Maribyrnong River valley has been home for the Wurundjeri people of the Kulin nation for up to 40,000 years. Human remains dated at least 15,000 years old have been found along the river, with much older signs of human habitation also present.

The first Europeans to explore along the river were the party led by Charles Grimes, Deputy Surveyor-General of the Colony of New South Wales, in February 1803. John Batman is likely to have explored up the river in early 1835. With the establishment of the colony of Melbourne later that year, sheep runs were soon established by Edmund Davis Fergusson and Michael Solomon in the Avondale and Sunshine areas. On Solomon's sheep station the ford now near the west end of Canning Street in Avondale Heights soon became known as Solomon's Ford. This was the lowest crossing on the Saltwater (Maribyrnong) River, and the furthest inland point of tidal influence. Batman is believed to have crossed the river at this point probably in the well worn steps of Aboriginals. It was for many years the only way from Melbourne to Geelong and land west.

During the second half of the 19th century much of Melbourne's industry was located along the river, and the water quality became very degraded. With the closure of many industries since the 1960s and 1970s, much river front land has opened up to parkland and residential estates.

=== Heritage listings ===
Sites, on the banks of the river, have been added to the Victorian Heritage Register, including:

- Albion Viaduct
- Arundel Road Trestle Bridge
- Avon River Rail Bridge
- Brimbank Park
- Buckland River Crossing
- Footscray Wharves Precinct, incorporating the Saltwater River Crossing Site, on the west bank of the river
- Genoa River Bridges
- Green Gully archaeological site
- Keilor archaeological site
- Keilor Iron Bridge
- Little River Railway Station and Goods Yard
- River House, Kew
- Saltwater River Rail Bridge including elements also listed on the now defunct Register of the National Estate
- Thomson River Diversion Tunnel Site

== Recreational use ==
As the second major river in metropolitan Melbourne, the Maribyrnong plays a very important part in Melbourne's recreation. Boating, cycling along its bike paths such as the Maribyrnong River Trail, fishing, and walking. Light bushwalking can also be done and nature watchers can observe Australian native fauna such as echidna, wallabies as well as the ubiquitous possums and flying foxes.

== Crossings ==
From source to mouth, the following road and rail bridges and other structures cross the Maribyrnong River, showing their contemporary use:

- Arundel Road Weir – pedestrians
- Arundel Road Bridge (1989) – local road
- Arundel Road Trestle Bridge (1906–7) – closed to vehicles 1989, closed to pedestrians 2007; partially destroyed by floods in 2022
- Flora Street Bridge – local road and private access
- Calder Freeway Bridge – dual carriageway as two bridges, Calder Freeway
- Keilor Iron Bridge (1868) – pedestrians, since 2012
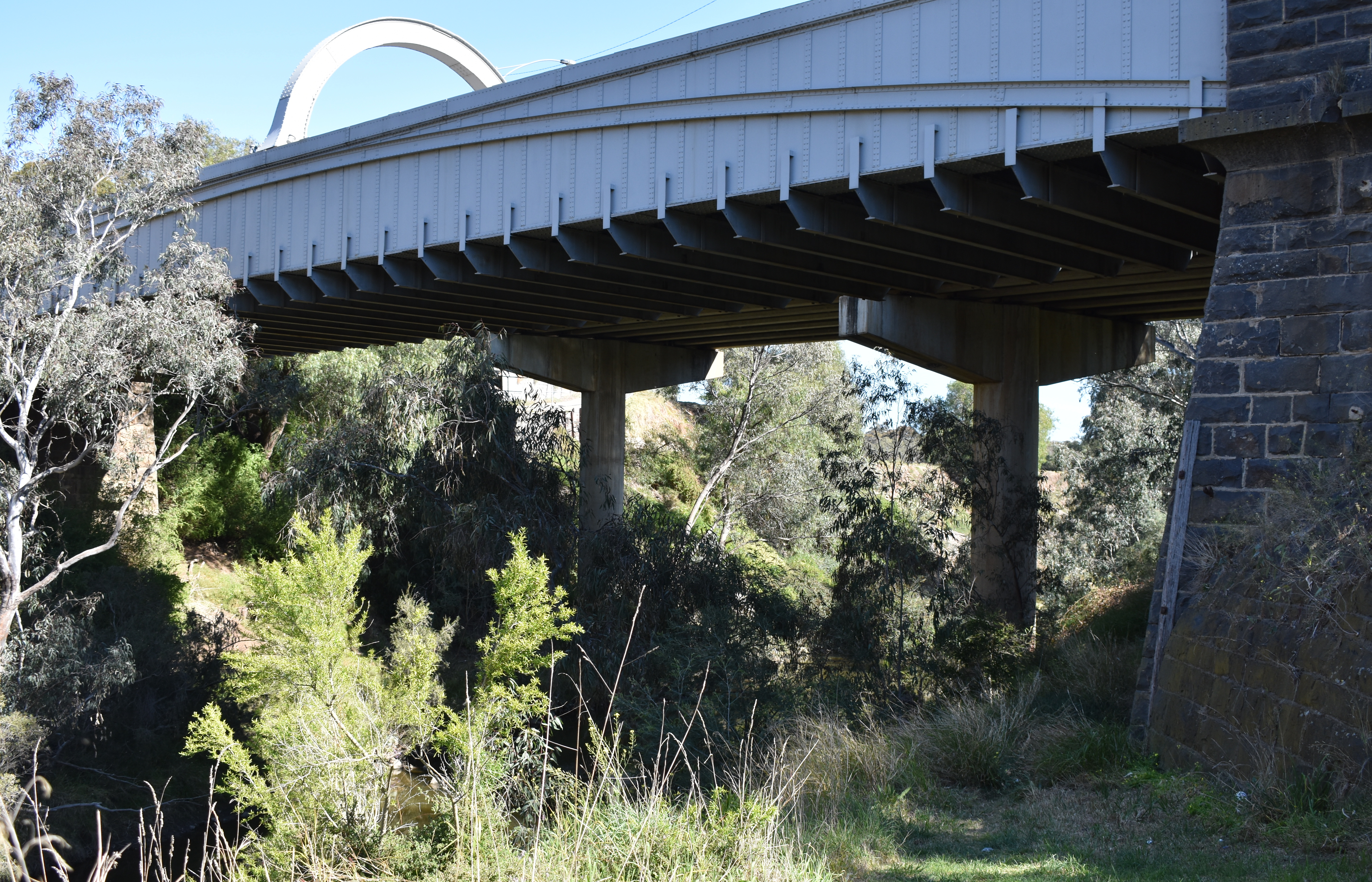
  Keilor Iron Bridge
- Old Calder Highway Bridge – Old Calder Highway, primary arterial road
- Brimbank Park ford – pedestrians
- Ford – south-east of Kealba, pedestrians
- E.J. Whitten Bridge – M80 Ring Road, as the Western Ring Road
- Albion Viaduct (1929) – Albion-Jacana line
- Solomon's Ford (c. 1830s – c. 1840s) – the first crossing point in Melbourne, pedestrians
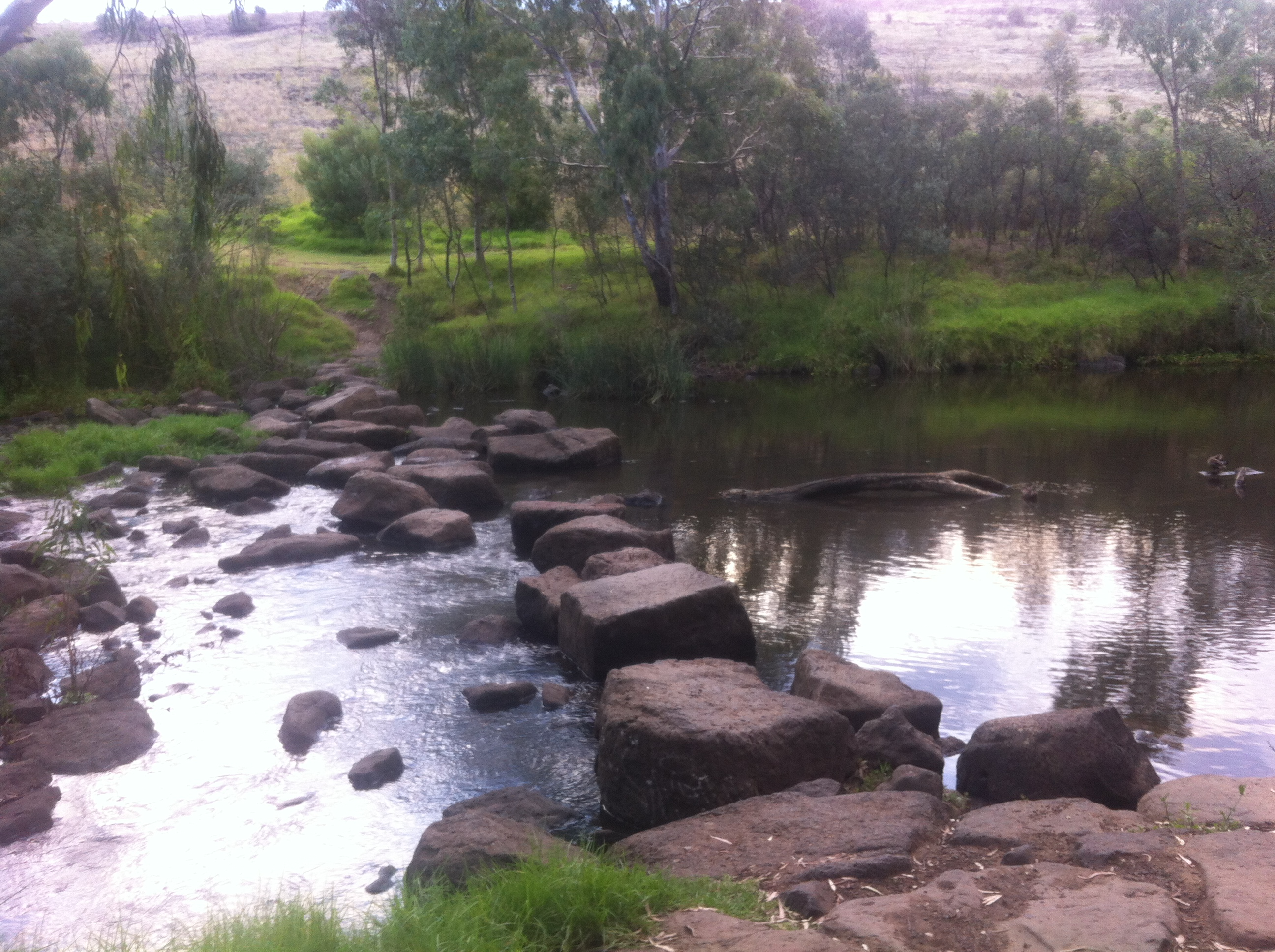
  Solomon's Ford, Avondale Heights
- Lorenc Bridge (1929) – pedestrians, water supply
- Canning Street Bridge (1970) – primary arterial road
- Afton Street Footbridge – pedestrians
- Raleigh Road Bridge – Raleigh Road / Maribyrnong Road, primary arterial road
- Pipemakers Park Footbridge (1995) – Maribyrnong River Trail, pedestrians and cyclists
- Fisher Parade Road Bridge – secondary arterial road, named as Farnsworth Avenue on the western bank
- Lynchs Bridge (1935) – dual carriageway as two bridges, Princes Highway as Ballarat Road
- Angliss Stock Bridge – relocated from Punt Road, South Yarra, pedestrians and cyclists
- Saltwater River Rail Bridge – comprises three separate rail bridges that carry the Sunbury line
- Hopetoun Bridge – Doron Road, primary arterial road
- Brunbury Street Railway Bridge (1928) – South Kensington–West Footscray line
- Shepherd Bridge and adjacent footbridge – Footscray Road, primary arterial road
- West Gate Tunnel elevated section (2025) – toll road
- Entrance and exit ramps of West Gate Tunnel (separate structures) – access roads to the Port of Melbourne

== Flora and fauna ==
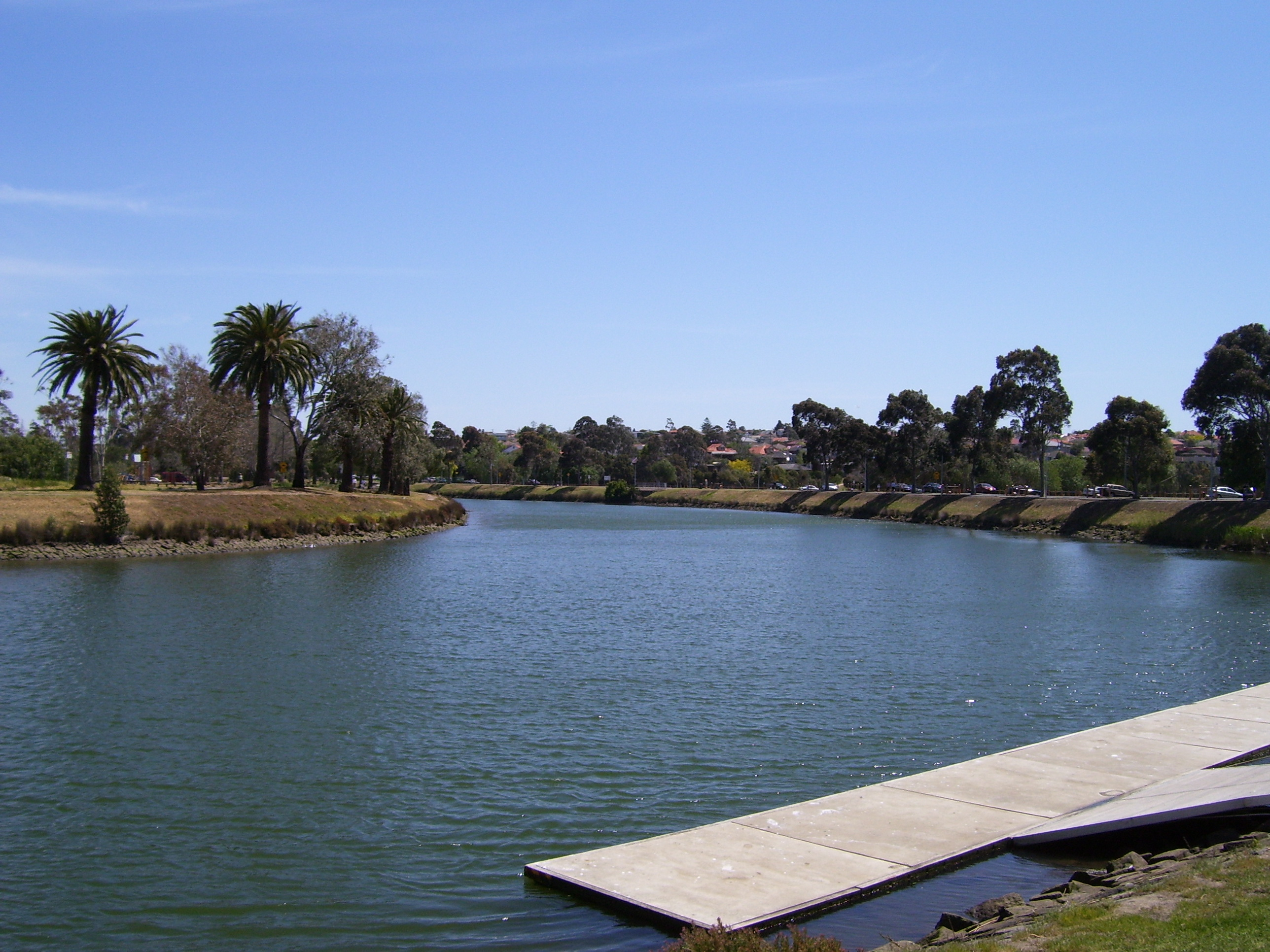
The river as it flows through Aberfeldie

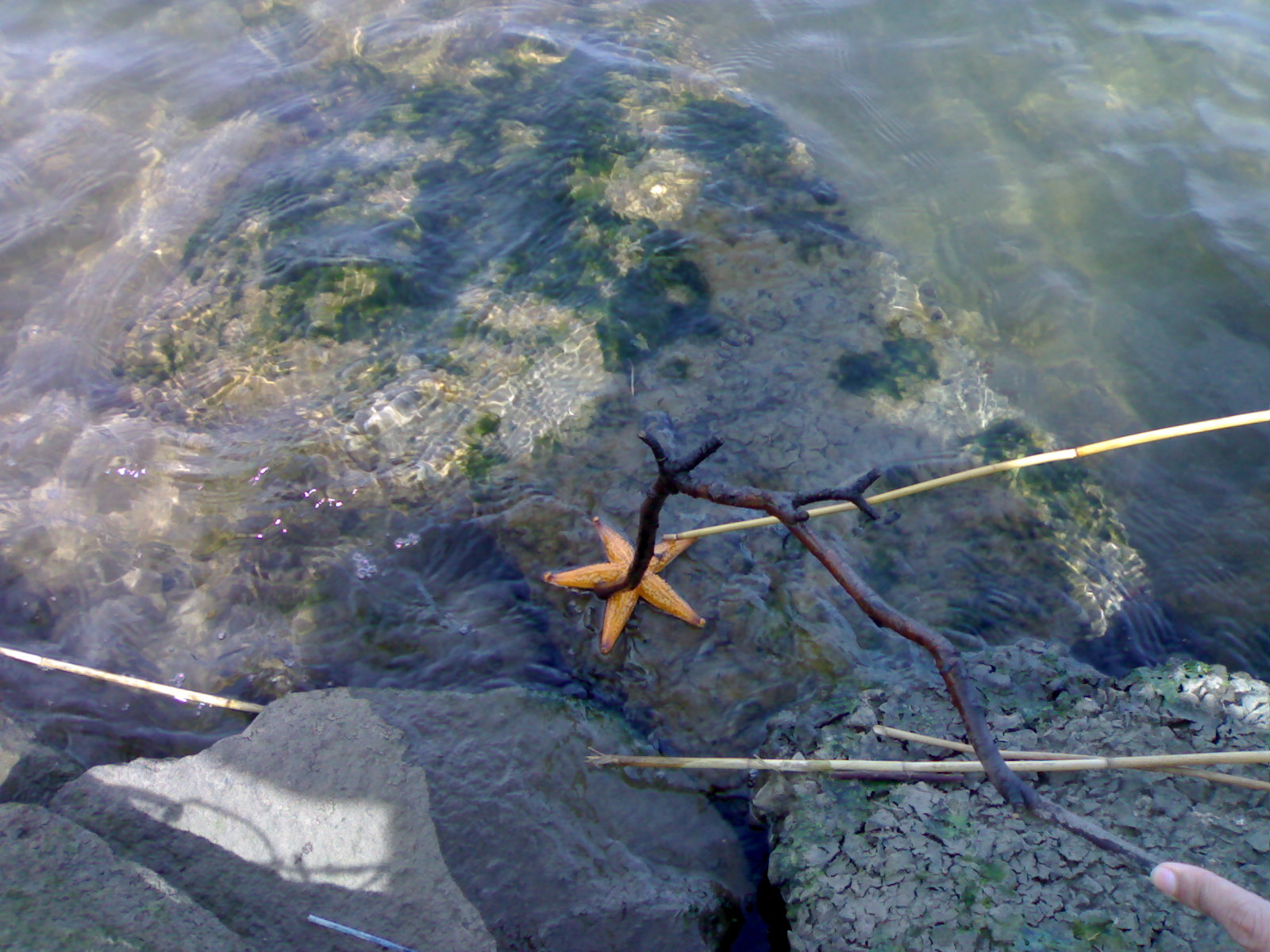
A starfish in the Maribyrnong River near the Flemington Racecourse

=== Native species ===
Many native species exist along the Maribyrnong River with many species thriving in the area. Native mammals include swamp wallabies, grey-headed flying foxes, common brushtail possums, common ringtail possums, water rats, echidnas, and platypus in the upper reaches of the river. Native reptile species include eastern brown snakes, tiger snakes, skinks, and common snakeneck turtles. Native birds include the eastern whipbird, cockatoo, rainbow lorikeet, galah, brown falcon, peregrine falcon, square-tailed kite, royal spoonbill, black swan, Pacific black duck, little pied cormorant, moorhen, and long-billed corella. There are various native frogs and native fish species include the short-finned eel, tupong, short-headed lamprey, Australian grayling, southern black bream, common galaxias, broad-finned galaxias and spotted galaxias. Starfish may also be found in the river.

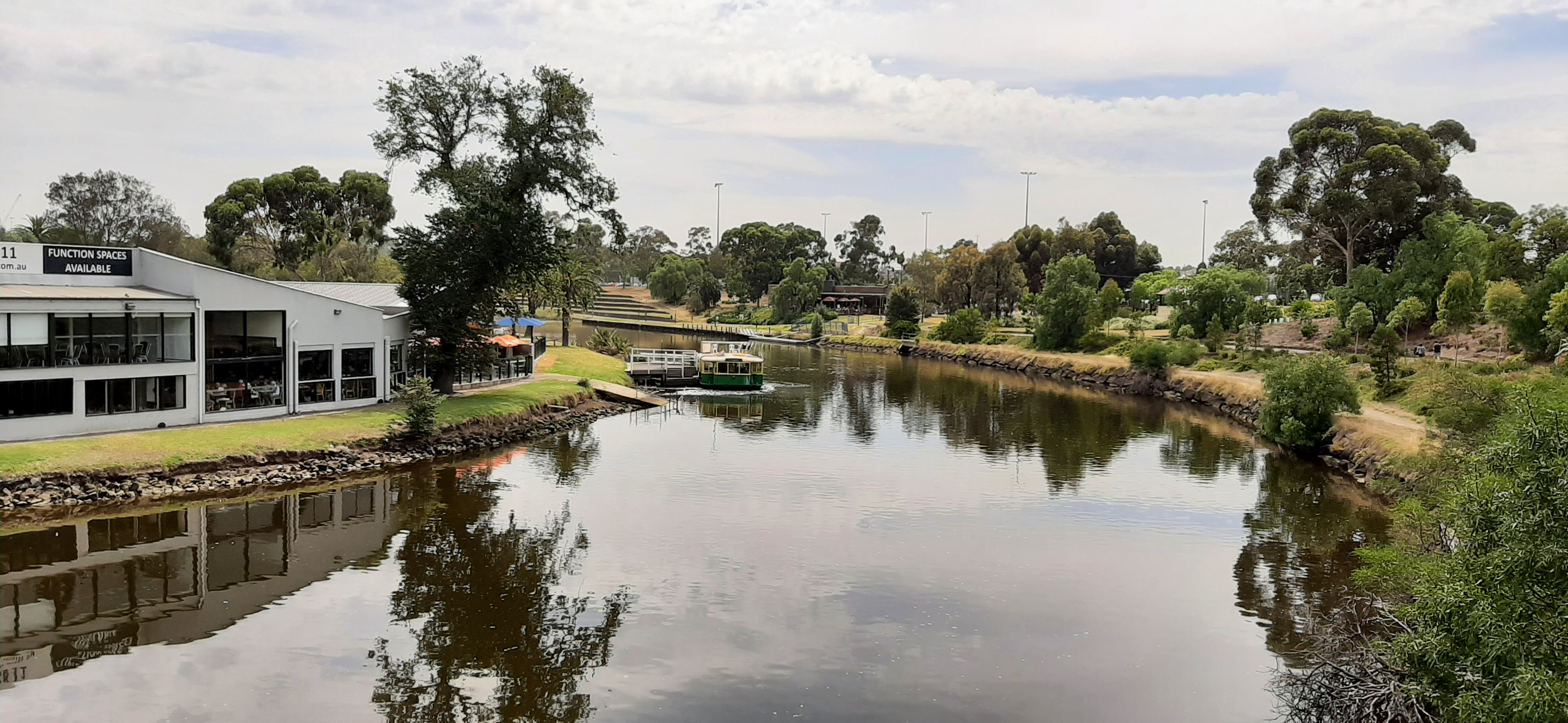
The river as seen from the Maribyrnong Road Bridge

=== Introduced species ===
Introduced species include the red fox, European rabbit, and feral cat. While introduced birds include the song thrush, common blackbird, common myna, common starling, house sparrow, spotted turtle dove, rock pigeon, and mallard. Common carp have also been introduced to the river.

== Environmental issues ==
The Maribyrnong River faces various environmental issues, apart from introduced pest species, also pollution and contamination – arsenic and heavy metals from industry and litter including one trap to mitigate litter entering the river from stormwater. Today, industrial pollution still occurs due to poor chemical handling practices, improper storage, and dilapidated infrastructure. Continued land development for housing causes soil disturbance resulting in increased river turbidity.

== See also ==
- Afton Street Conservation Reserve
- List of rivers of Australia § Victoria
