= New Britain water rat =

Conservation status
- Data Deficient (IUCN 3.1)

Scientific classification
- Domain: Eukaryota
- Kingdom: Animalia
- Phylum: Chordata
- Class: Mammalia
- Order: Rodentia
- Family: Muridae
- Genus: Hydromys
- Species: H. neobritannicus

Binomial name
- Hydromys neobritannicus Tate & Archbold, 1935

Species of rodent

The New Britain water rat (Hydromys neobritannicus) is a species of semiaquatic rodent in the family Muridae. It is found only on the island of New Britain in Papua New Guinea. It is threatened by habitat loss.
