= Arundel Road Trestle Bridge =

Trestle bridge in Melbourne, Australia

- Coordinates: 37°42′16″S 144°49′59″E
- Carried: Arundel Road; no longer in use
- Crossed: Maribyrnong River
- Began: Keilor (south)
- Ended: Tullamarine (north)
- Other name: Arundel Trestle Bridge
- Preceded by: Arundel Road Bridge (1989)
- Followed by: Flora Street Bridge

Characteristics
- Design: Trestle bridge
- Material: Timber
- Total length: 72 m (236 ft)
- Width: 3.7 m (12 ft)
- No. of spans: 9

History
- Construction start: May 1906
- Construction end: September 1907
- Construction cost: £680
- Opened: September 1907; 119 years ago
- Rebuilt: 1977–1978 (restored)
- Destroyed: October 2022 (partially washed away)
- Closed: 1989 – to vehicular traffic; 2007 – all users
- Replaced by: Arundel Road Bridge (1989)

Statistics
- Daily traffic: nil

Victorian Heritage Register
- Official name: Trestle Bridge
- Type: Registered place
- Designated: 13 September 2001
- Reference no.: H1952
- Heritage overlay nos.: HO15; HO395
- Category: Transport - Road

Register of the National Estate
- Official name: Trestle Bridge, Arundel Rd
- Type: Defunct register
- Designated: 22 June 1983
- Reference no.: 18458

Location
- Interactive map of Arundel Road Trestle Bridge

The Arundel Road Trestle Bridge, also known as the Arundel Trestle Bridge, is a disused and damaged trestle bridge across the Maribyrnong River that carried Arundel Road, between Keilor, in the City of Brimbank to Tullamarine, in the City of Hume, located in the outer north-western suburbs of Melbourne, in Victoria, Australia. Following the extreme flooding of the Maryibrong River during October 2022, the former bridge was partially washed away with only a short section on the northern (Tullamarine) bank left intact.

Completed in 1907, replaced in 1989, closed to all users in 2007, and partially destroyed in 2022, the former bridge is located on the traditional lands of the Wurundjeri people. The former bridge was added to the Victorian Heritage Register on 13 September 2001 in recognition of its historical and technical significance; and was also added to non-statutory lists by the Victorian branch of the National Trust on 3 February 1986 and the now defunct Register of the National Estate on 22 June 1983.

== History ==
The Overnewton estate in Keilor was one of the earliest estates in Victoria to be acquired under the Victorian Closer Settlement Act on 29 May 1905. The Closer Settlement scheme is important to the State of Victoria as one of sequence of Government schemes from the 1860s onwards, which aimed at promoting closer settlement and agricultural development of the state. The Closer Settlement Act entitled the government to compulsorily acquire up to £500,000 worth of private land per year. Arundel Estate was one division of the original Overnewton Estate and was the first of the subdivisions undertaken in the Keilor district. Access to the Estate was impassable in wet weather hence the Shire of Keilor and the Closer Settlement Board raised the funds to construct a bridge across the Maribyrnong River at Arundel. The Closer Settlement Board initially contributed no more than £300 toward the construction of the bridge. They then raised this amount to £400 after council representatives suggested that selections would not be successful without the bridge.

Construction of the bridge began in May 1906. Works were slowed by a dispute over the supply of suitable timber. Half of the completed bridge was washed away after the flood in September and the bridge was then redesigned and lengthened. The new work began in early 1907 and the bridge was officially opened in September 1907, at a cost of £680. The bridge was an essential link to Melbourne for the market gardeners established under the scheme, who required frequent and reliable access in all weathers to the city markets.

Restoration work to the bridge was carried out from 1977–1978. A new bridge took over the flow of vehicular traffic in 1989. Lobbying by the ‘Friends of the Maribyrnong’ helped to prevent demolition of the old bridge as part of the new bridge works. The bridge was repaired, from 1989, to take pedestrian and equestrian traffic only. More restoration work was undertaken from 1996–1997 after vandalism had forced its closure during 1991.

During an extreme flood of October 2022, southern spans of the bridge were washed away when a shipping container, that was carried down the Maribyrnong River in flood waters, crashed into the bridge and ripped the structure apart. Only a short section on the northern (Tullamarine) bank of the bridge was left intact.

== Description ==
The timber bridge consisting of nine timber beam spans on timber trestle piers. The roadway is 72 metres (236 ft) long and 3.7 metres (12 ft) wide. The bridge slopes between the high north bank and the lower alluvial flats on The bridge features a two pile-pier system of construction. The original transverse deck was replaced with longitudinal planks. Extra piles were added on either side of the piers in the river to stabilise the bridge against floods and compensate for the deterioration of the original piles.

The bridge was a component of the Victorian government-funded road system designed to allow access to the Arundel Estate, an area of land repurchased by the Government as part of their scheme to encourage closer settlement. This scheme, which was later followed by the Soldier Settlement Scheme, resulted in some areas in the development of major townships or city suburbs.

== See also ==
- List of bridges in Melbourne
- List of places on the Victorian Heritage Register in the City of Brimbank
- List of places on the Victorian Heritage Register in the City of Hume
