= Green Gully archaeological site =

The Green gully archaeological site is an Aboriginal archaeological site in Keilor, Victoria, Australia. The site was discovered during soil quarrying in the 1960s, when artefacts and a burial were uncovered in the alluvial terraces in the Maryibyrnong Valley.

The site is located near the confluence of Taylors Creek and the Maribyrnong River at 37°43′46″S 144°49′42″E.

The Keilor Terraces were identified as a sequence of Pleistocene alluvial terraces, which in several locations have revealed very old Aboriginal remains, for example the Keilor archaeological site.

The site has also been important in development of an understanding of climate change and different river conditions in the Melbourne area over a period of more than 30,000 years.

The Catalogue of Fossil Hominids Database notes that the site is dated to about 6500 years old.
