= Melbourne's Living Museum of the West =

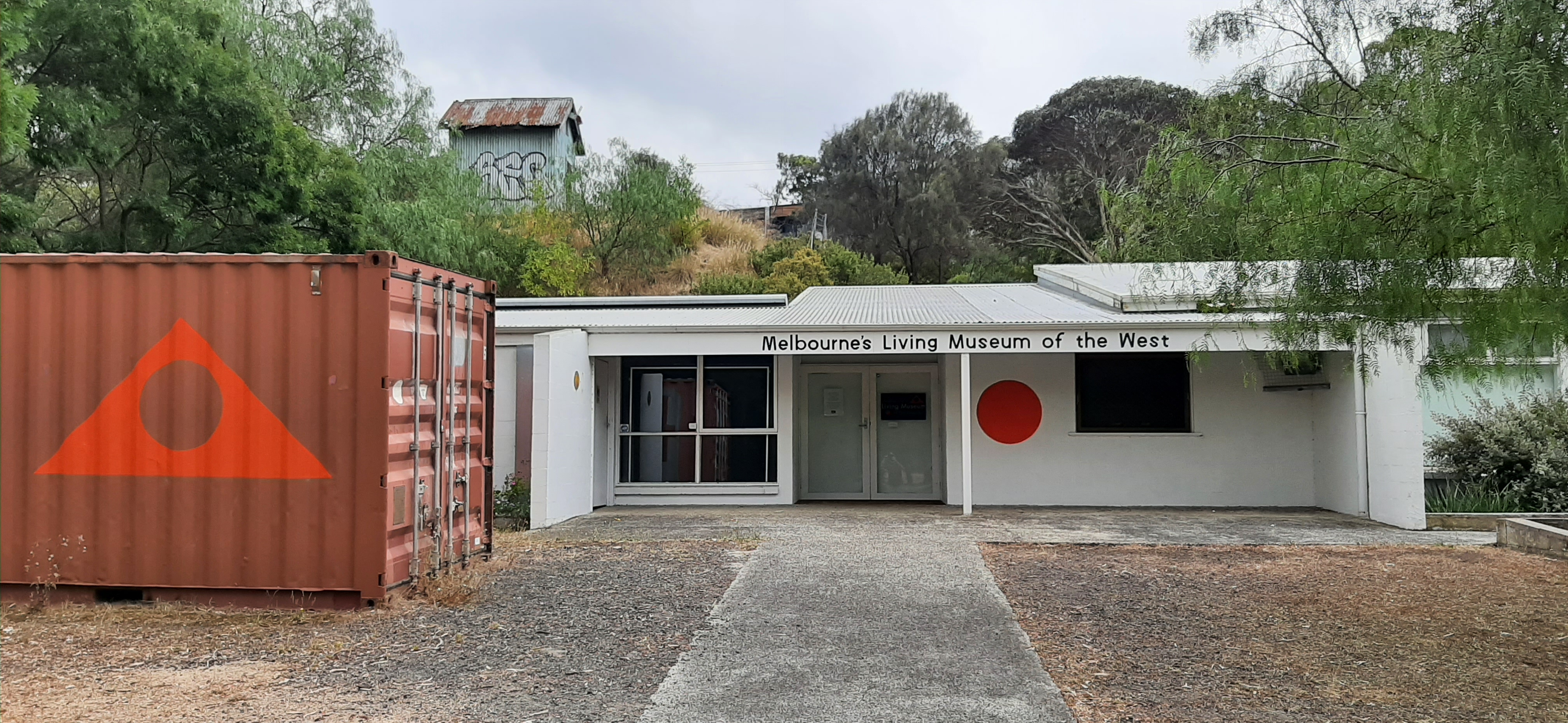
- Entrance to the museum in 2022, prior to its temporary closure for renovations in 2025

- Location of the museum in Melbourne
- Established: 1984; 42 years ago
- Location: Pipemakers Park, Maribyrnong, Melbourne, Victoria, Australia
- Coordinates: 37°46′32″S 144°53′42″E
- Type: History, culture and ecomuseum
- Key holdings: Industrial, environmental, social and Indigenous history of the western suburbs of Melbourne
- Collections: Books, reports and articles; maps, plans and drawings; photographs; oral histories; exhibition materials
- Collection size: c. 10000
- Founder: Melbourne & Metropolitan Board of Works
- Founding Patron: Joan Kirner AC ( –2015)
- Director: Rebecca Dauti
- President: Kerrie Poliness
- Website: livingmuseum.org.au

Melbourne's Living Museum of the West (Note: Generally simplified as the Living Museum of the West, or just the Living Museum.) is a community history, culture and ecomuseum, located in Maribyrnong, a western suburb of Melbourne, in Victoria, Australia. The focus of the museum is to document, preserve and interpret the industrial, environmental, social and Indigenous history of the western suburbs of Melbourne.

Established as part of Victoria's sesquicentenary in 1984, along with the Children's Museum and the Museum of Chinese Australian History, the museum is contained within the Pipemakers Park and forms part of the Pipemakers Park Complex, a former manufacturing site that consists of three historic bluestone buildings and other structures. The Pipemakers Park Complex was added to the Victorian Heritage Register on 20 August 1982, in advance of the museum's establishment, due to its historical, archaeological and architectural significance. In 2025, the museum temporarily moved to the Maribyrnong Library whilst refurbishments are completed at the Pipemakers Park site.

The museum is located on the traditional lands of the Wurundjeri people.

== Origin and philosophy ==
The museum was established in 1984 in Footscray, specifically to address the perceived disadvantage of Melbourne's Western Region, which as well as being generally a working class, industrial area, was considered to lack many cultural facilities. The ecomuseum concept was adopted to focus on the environment, landscape and people and their culture, and to involve the community in recording and preserving their own stories.

Described as "Australia's first ecomuseum, the museum focusses on the stories of people of Melbourne's Western Region, extending from Footscray to Bacchus Marsh, and from Sunbury to Werribee. Initially intended to be a museum without walls and focussing on oral history recording and community participation, it did not have a tradition objects collection until more recently.

The museum's founding patron was Joan Kirner AC, a former Premier of Victoria, until her death in 2015.

Having lost its recurrent core funding from Arts Victoria, in 2011 the Living Museum went into decline and struggled to secure replacement income. For a time it was dominated by a group of local artists known as MREAM (Maribyrnong River Edge Art Movement, who wished to develop the Pipemakers Park as artists studios and exhibition space, but were subsequently outvoted in 2011. In 2012 the Living Museum re-established the collection in the Visitor Centre in Pipemakers Park and commenced digitising the collection and presenting and publishing the archives on the internet.

== Collection ==
The Living Museum maintains a resources collection which includes over 10,000 documents, photographs, tapes and artefacts which form the resource centre, as well as the personnel and facilities at the museum itself. The collections include published books, reports and articles; maps, plans and drawings; a photographic archive; oral histories; and exhibition materials. It contains about 500 artefacts, 5000 archival records (primarily copies of documents and plans), 10,000 photographic images (both copies of historical photographs and contemporary photos documenting the region and museum activities). Its most significant core collection is the oral history recordings, which focusses on the "themes of migration, work, environment, culture, heritage, industry, women in the community and the everyday stories of the people of Melbourne's West".

== See also ==
- List of museums in Victoria
- Industrial archaeology
