= Shaw Mayer's water rat =

Conservation status
- Least Concern (IUCN 3.1)

Scientific classification
- Domain: Eukaryota
- Kingdom: Animalia
- Phylum: Chordata
- Class: Mammalia
- Order: Rodentia
- Family: Muridae
- Genus: Baiyankamys
- Species: B. shawmayeri

Binomial name
- Baiyankamys shawmayeri Hinton, 1943

Synonyms
- Hydromys shawmayeri

Species of rodent

Shaw Mayer's water rat (Baiyankamys shawmayeri) is a semiaquatic species of rodent in the family Muridae. It is found in the mountains of Papua New Guinea.

== Names ==
It is known as kuypep kuykuy-sek in the Kalam language of Papua New Guinea.
