= Mountain water rat =

Conservation status
- Data Deficient (IUCN 3.1)

Scientific classification
- Kingdom: Animalia
- Phylum: Chordata
- Class: Mammalia
- Order: Rodentia
- Family: Muridae
- Genus: Baiyankamys
- Species: B. habbema

Binomial name
- Baiyankamys habbema (Tate & Archbold, 1941)

Synonyms
- Hydromys habbema

Species of rodent

The mountain water rat (Baiyankamys habbema) is a semiaquatic species of rodent in the family Muridae. It is found in West Papua, Indonesia and Papua New Guinea. Its natural habitat is rivers.
