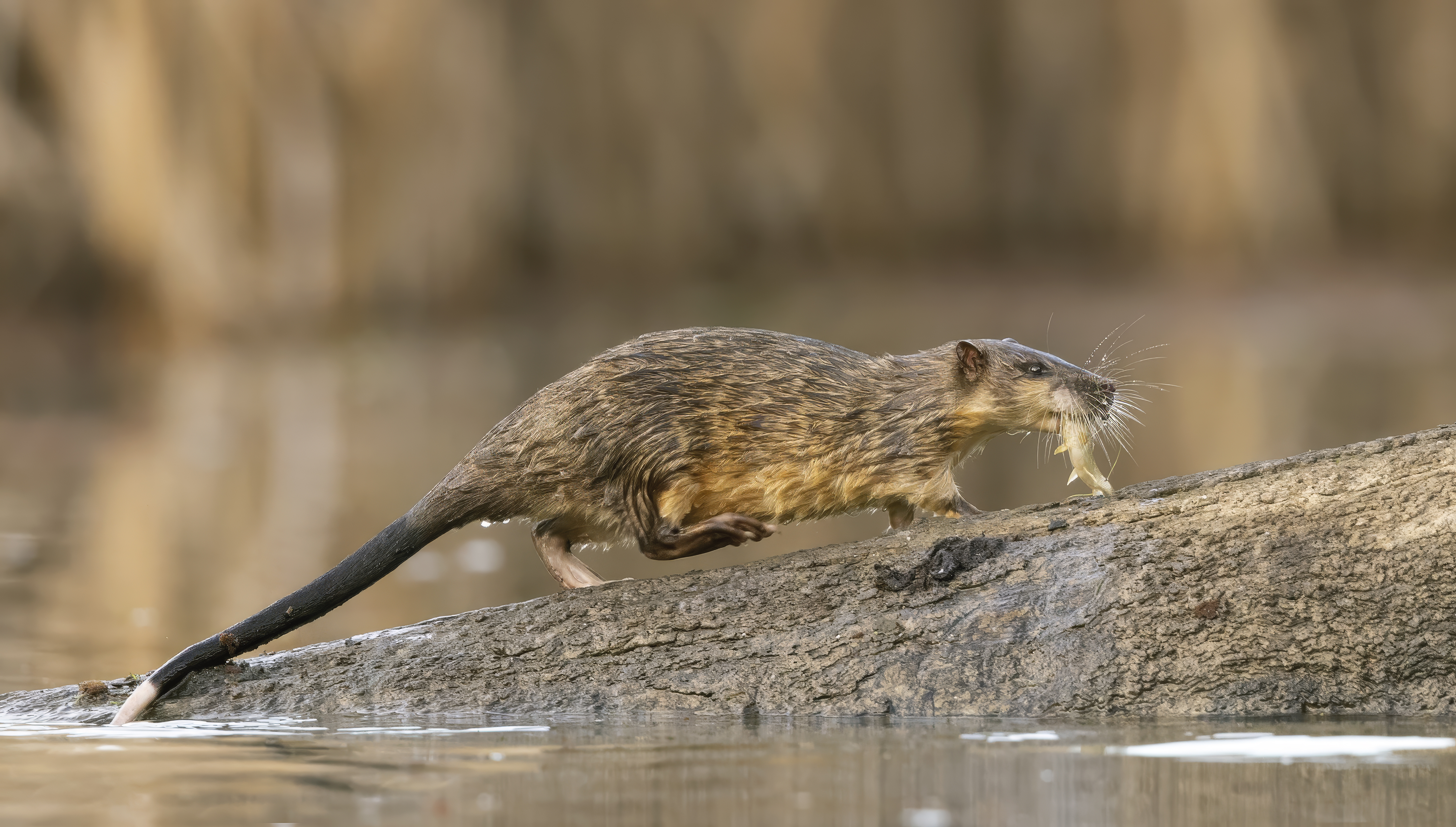

Conservation status
- Least Concern (IUCN 3.1)

Scientific classification
- Kingdom: Animalia
- Phylum: Chordata
- Class: Mammalia
- Order: Rodentia
- Family: Muridae
- Genus: Hydromys
- Species: H. chrysogaster

Binomial name
- Hydromys chrysogaster Geoffroy, 1804
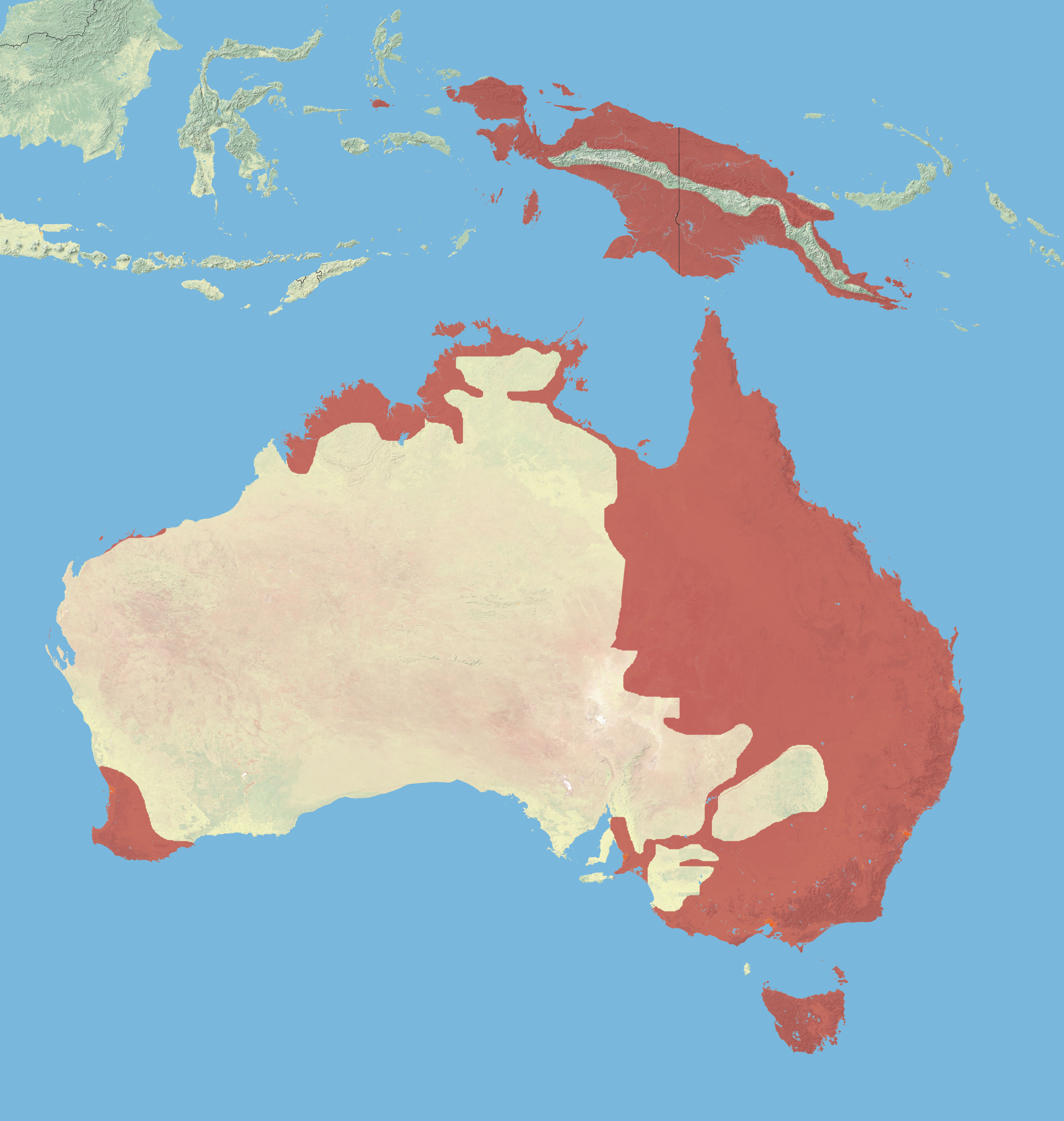
- Distribution of the rakali

= Rakali =

Rakali Temporal range: Holocene

Species of mammal

The rakali (Hydromys chrysogaster), also known as the rabe, the "Australian otter" or water-rat, is an Australian native rodent first scientifically described in 1804. Adoption of the Ngarrindjeri name rakali is intended to foster a positive public attitude by Environment Australia.

One of four described species in the genus Hydromys, it is the only one with a range extending beyond New Guinea. Having adapted to and colonised a unique niche of a semiaquatic and nocturnal lifestyle, this species lives in burrows on the banks of rivers, lakes and estuaries and feeds on aquatic insects, fish, crustaceans, mussels, snails, frogs, cane toads, bird's eggs and small water birds.

Rakali have a body length of 23–37 cm (9–15 in), weigh 340–1,275 g (12–45 oz), and have a thick tail measuring around 24–35 cm (9–14 in). Females are generally smaller than males but tail lengths are normally the same. They have partially webbed hind legs, waterproof fur, a flattened head, a long blunt nose, many whiskers and small ears and eyes. The body is streamlined with a skull that is large, flat and elongated, with two molars on the upper and lower jaw, similar to the water mouse. They are black to brown in colour with an orange to white belly, and dark tail with a white tip.

Long considered a nuisance animal, rakali were hunted for their soft fur, particularly in the Depression of the 1930s, when a ban was placed on imported pelts such as the American muskrat. With their numbers under threat, a protection order was issued in 1938. However, they were still subject to destruction permits from 1938 to 1957 due to their effect on irrigation banks and alleged damage to fishing nets. Additionally, from 1957 to 1967 a number of licensed seasons were also held for this reason.

== Common names ==
Until the 1980s, this species was commonly known as "water-rat" (also "common water-rat", or "golden-bellied water-rat"), but during the 1990s there was a push for such descriptive English common names to be replaced with indigenous names. In 1995, the Australian Nature Conservation Agency released a document in which the following indigenous names were recorded for H. chrysogaster. They recommended that "rakali" be adopted as the common name, and the Australian Department of Environment and Heritage has taken up this suggestion. Both common names are now widespread.

Indigenous names for Hydromys chrysogaster
Indigenous name	Linguistic group or area
Ayam	Miyanmin
Bud-bud	Ngarigu
Dalgan	Djabugay
Dhulurryamba	East Arnhem
Djinnjokma	Daly River
Durrgin	Guugudic
Galiba:y	Yawaalaraay
Guma:y	Yawaalaraay
Gurrumu	Yolngu
Jawurrk	Kamu
Kal	Wik-Mungkan
Kathi thukathayini	Innamincka
Kirnrti	Kalkatungu
Kumbuna	Nyikina, Kayardild
Mamgericht	Nyungar
Minha watha	Kugu Nganhcara
Moinah	Tasmania
Moo'nyp	Wik-Ngathana
Mu-mun	Murrinh
Mulundarru	Upper Barcoo
Murit-ya	Nyungar
Muuruung	Kuurnkopan
Namurr	Yanyuwa
Ngaljatbil	Jawoyn
Ngoor-joo, Ngurju, ngoodjo	Nyungar
Ngwir-ri-gin, ngwiridjin	King George Sound, Nyungar
Njimba'rrolbumbu	Mayali
Nurn	Warray
Otol	Gnog
Pikun	Ngiyampaa
Pikunra	Kalkatungu
Pwampungini	Tiwi
Rakali	Murray River
Rekaldi	Ngarrindjeri
Renah	Tasmania
Riyariyangkanu	Yanyuwa
Thaargh	Kurtjar
Wambu	Wunambal
Wamp-wamp	Noongar
Wampi	Ungaringyin
Wapu-nu	Gupaguyngu
Wapun-u	Yolŋu
Wardunda	Kayardild, Nyikina
Warunu	East Arnhem
Wath	Wik-Mungkan
Wirrkup	Maung
Wubui	Yidiny
Wungujang wara	Nunggubuyu
Wurriyangkirraburna	Groote Eylandt
Yanjuna	Wanyi
Yerr-ek	Wada wurrung
Yirrku	Gaagudju
Yirrkku	Kunwinjku
Yurru	Mangarrayi

== Taxonomy and description ==
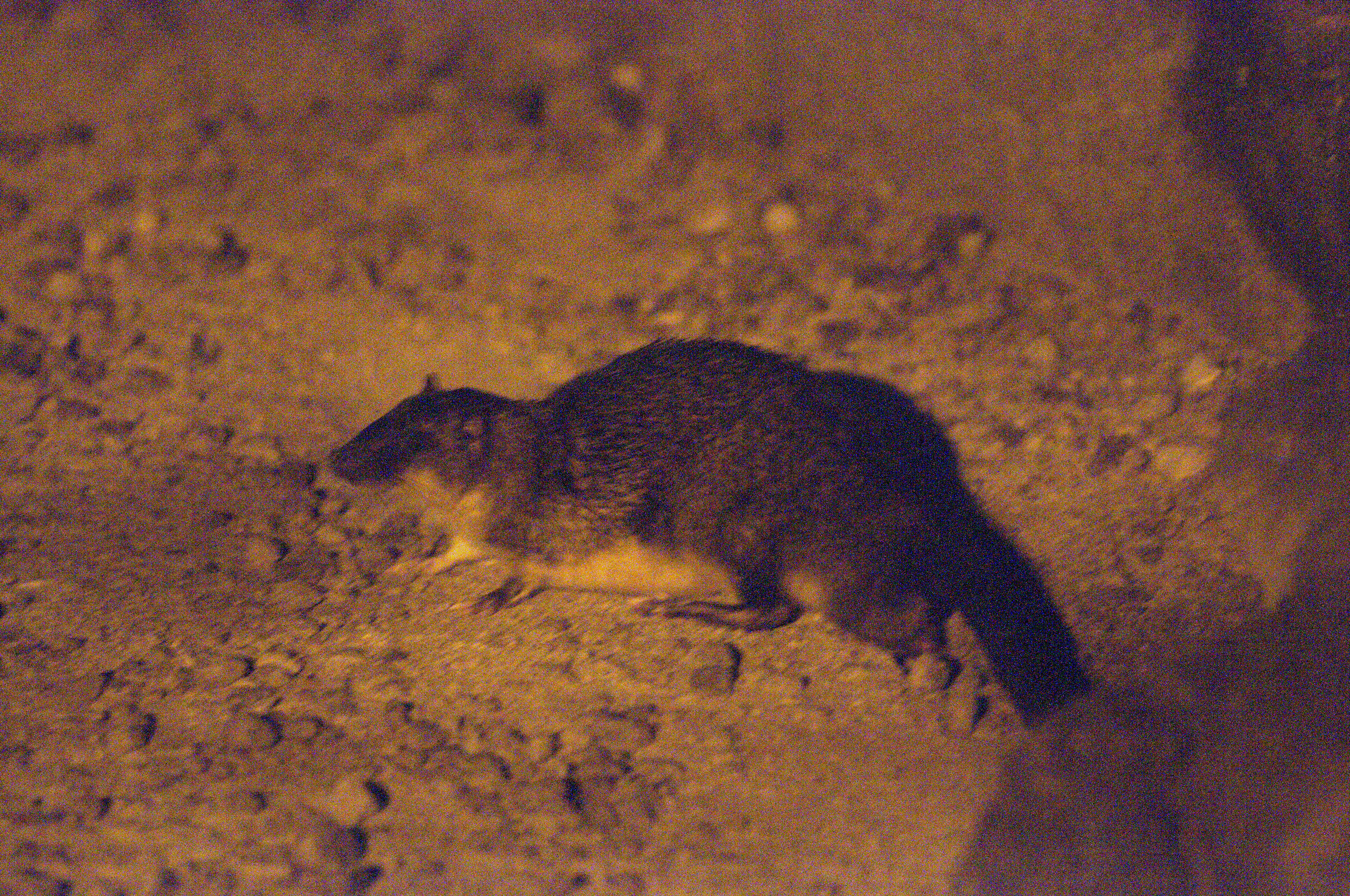
Rakali: Breakwater St Kilda.

Hydromys chrysogaster is the most specialised of the Hydromyini rodent group for aquatics. They feature a flattened head, partly webbed hind feet and water repellent fur that also offers insulation. Their waterproof thick coat varies from extremely dark fur, black to slate grey on their back and white to orange underneath. The thick dark tail is an identifying feature with its white tip. Their coat changes through the process of moulting, according to sex. Males and females moult in autumn and summer, and females additionally in spring. Moulting is conditional to temperature, reproductive condition, adrenal weight, health and social interaction. The hind feet are wide and partially webbed, the broad face, flattened head and long whiskers are all distinguishing features. Their body grows to a length of about 39 cm (15 in) excluding the tail.

This well-adapted semi-aquatic and territorial species may become very aggressive in high-density populations as they are mostly solitary. Fighting is common, leading to scarred tails from being bitten during fighting amongst both adult males and females. Animals often exhibit ulcerated wounds, subcutaneous cysts and tumours mostly in the dorsal and posterior regions.

== Ecology ==
=== Distribution, range and habitat ===
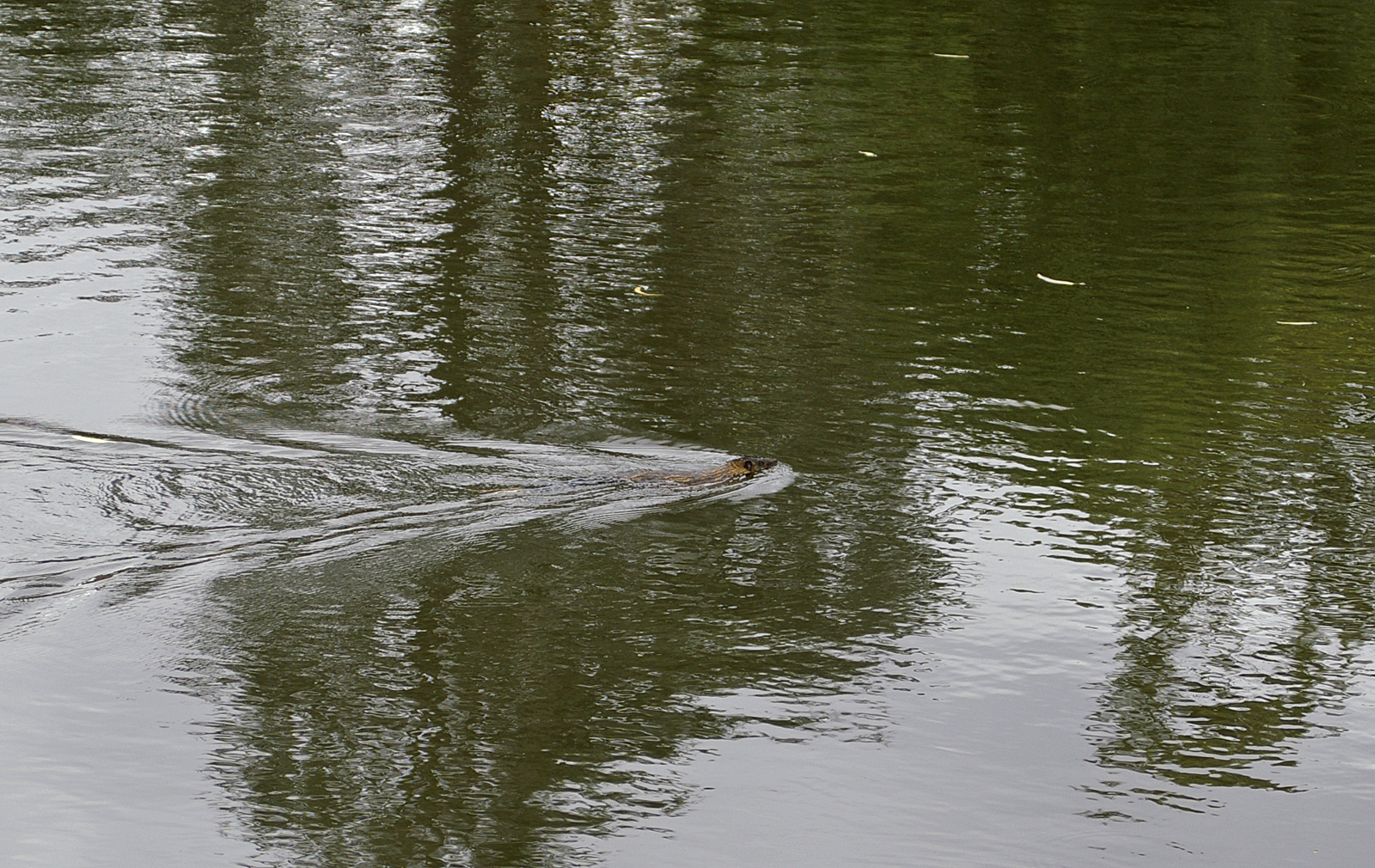
Habitat: Rakali swimming in a creek

This widespread species can be found in permanent water systems in Australia, New Guinea and offshore islands. Rakali live near permanent water in a diverse range of habitat that varies from fresh slow-moving streams, brackish inland lakes and creeks to wetlands, rivers, estuaries and beaches on coastlines. Found in all states and territories, this adaptable species has resumed resettlement populations in both Australia and New Guinea. The map above shows their distribution throughout Australia and New Guinea.

Widely distributed throughout most of eastern Australia (including Tasmania), along the coast of northern Australia (except for the Pilbara), and South West WA, their habitat varies from freshwater streams to brackish wetlands, including shallow lakes (up to 2 m (6 ft 7 in) in depth) and farm dams, deep water storages, slow-moving rivers, creeks and streams, estuaries, coastal lakes and sheltered marine bays.

Their home range typically comprises 1–4 km (0.6–2.5 mi) of waterways and they can travel a distance of between 200 m (660 ft) to 1 km (0.6 mi) in a night when foraging. They prefer low banks with flat, densely vegetated water edges for protection and ease of stalking prey, spending time when not foraging resting in hollow logs and burrows.

=== Diet and foraging ===
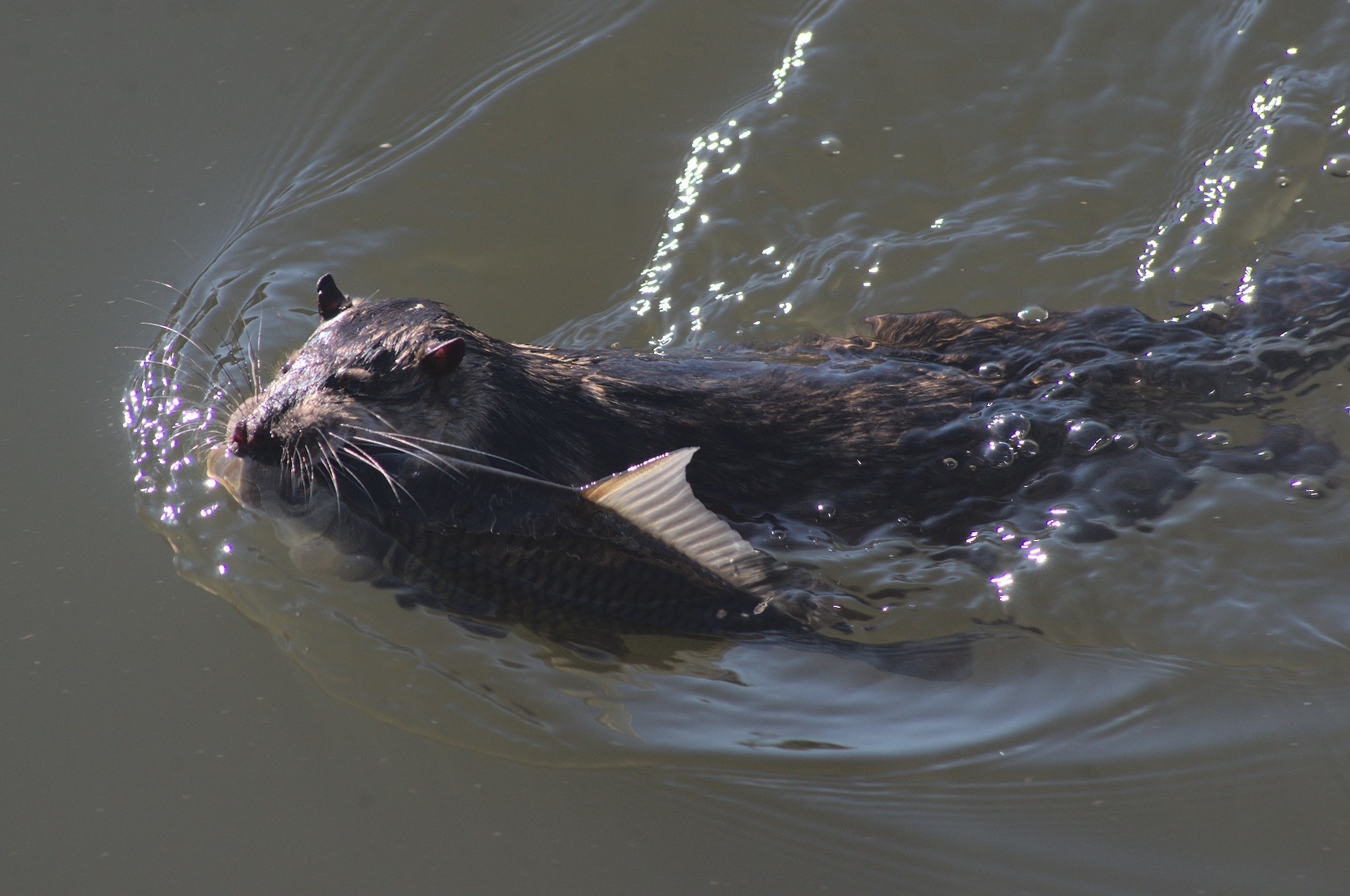
Rakali fishing in Lake Burley Griffin, ACT

The rakali is a predominantly carnivorous species, feeding on a variety of aquatic animals including fish, crustaceans, molluscs (such as mussels), other shellfish, insects, small birds (such as the young of waterfowl and poultry), eggs, mammals (such as house mice and even bats), frogs, and reptiles (such as young turtles). In winter, when resources are limited, they will also feed on plants. A mostly nocturnal species, they search for their food at dusk; guided by sight while in the water, and hunting at the water's edge with the apparent memory of previous catches' locations. They can also exhibit crepuscular habits, being found swimming and feeding in the early morning and evening. The animal does not tolerate low temperatures well, so they prefer terrestrial prey in winter over the aquatic species. They also spend longer winter periods in the warmth of their burrows.

A relatively new addition to the rakali's diet is, specifically, the heart and liver of the toxic cane toad, in regions where the toads have moved into their territory. The rakali have figured out how to avoid the toad's poisonous shoulder glands by flipping them onto their backs for ease of dispatch. They are, seemingly, unaffected by any poisonous secretions on the toads' skin which they may inadvertently ingest. This makes the rakali one of the very few natural defenses in the fight to contain the cane toad's population boom and spreading westward. Since the early twentieth century (when cane toads were introduced in the mistaken belief that they would control sugar cane beetles on farms), the toads in Australia have multiplied from an initial 100 animals to as many as 100 million. Their poisonous skin secretions (which the eggs and tadpoles contain as well) can kill a dog or cat, and have contributed to the decline of several species of Australian reptiles, mammals, fish, and birds.

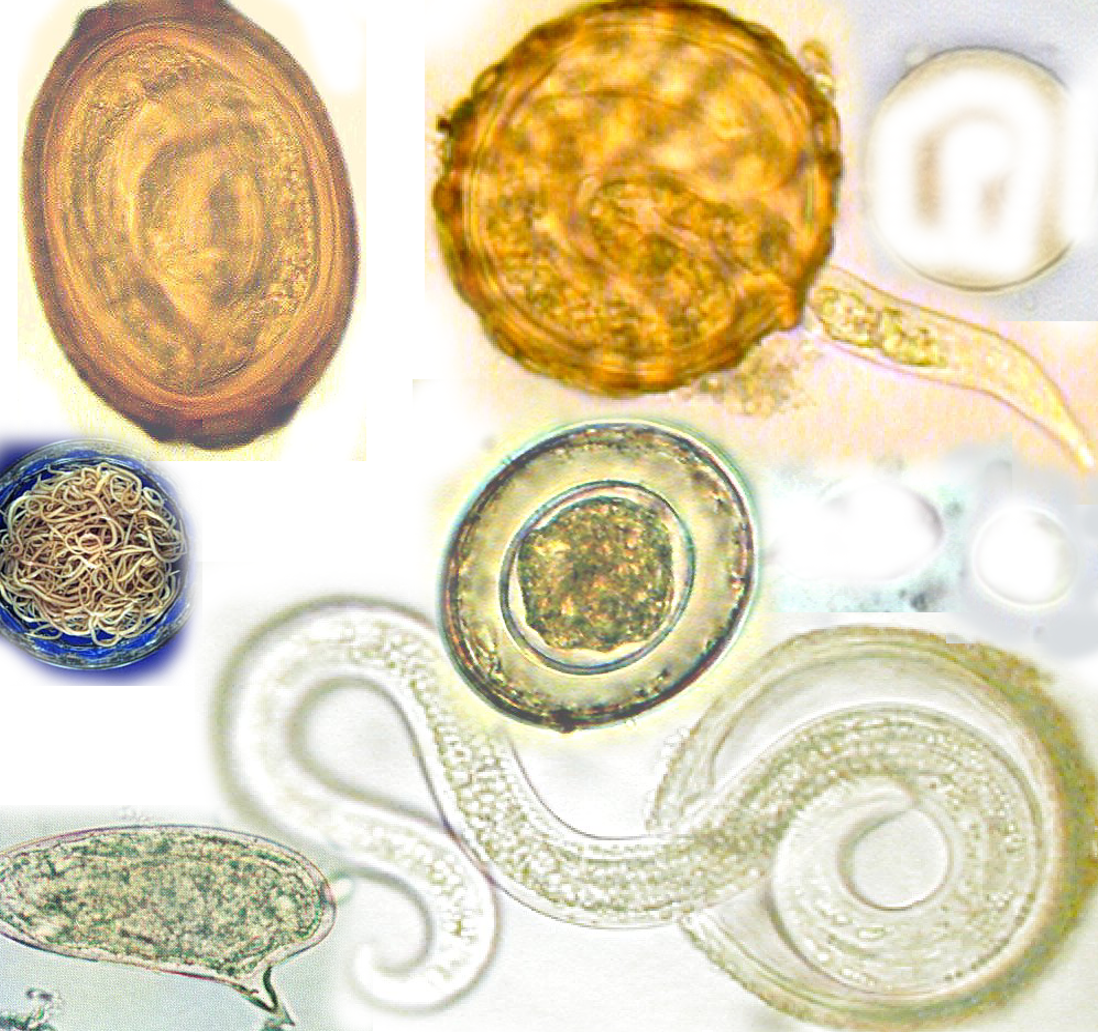
Helminth: various species of worms that infest water rats

Their diet makes this species susceptible to infestations of nematodes, with large numbers of Cosmocephalus australiensis recorded in 1959, burrowed into their stomach walls. Other worms, namely cestodes and trematodes, occur in high numbers in the small intestines. Sparganosis also afflicts rakali; these parasites coil under the skin surface around the shoulder and back region. The extent of infestation, and the varieties of helminths that are present, vary according to the region which they inhabit.

=== Metabolism ===
The rakali is not well adapted to hot and cold extremes as it has poor insulation qualities. Aquatic mammals need to maintain relatively constant body temperature to prevent or compensate for their thermally hostile environment. One of the few diurnal Australian rodents, they cannot maintain their body temperature below 15° and risk hyperthermia in temperatures that exceed 35°. Their vascular system has network adaptions for heat loss, but no major heat conserving vascular retia. This causes poor thermoregulation and poor insulative capacity in wet fur. They control body temperature by remaining in the burrow in the heat of the day in summer and by foraging during the day in winter.

Expending energy in this aquatic species is documented as lower, using less oxygen when moving on land than locomotion in water. Rakali have the capacity to run at twice their maximum swimming velocity. Their metabolic rate increases during running at a rate of 13-40% greater than when swimming.

=== Predators and predation ===
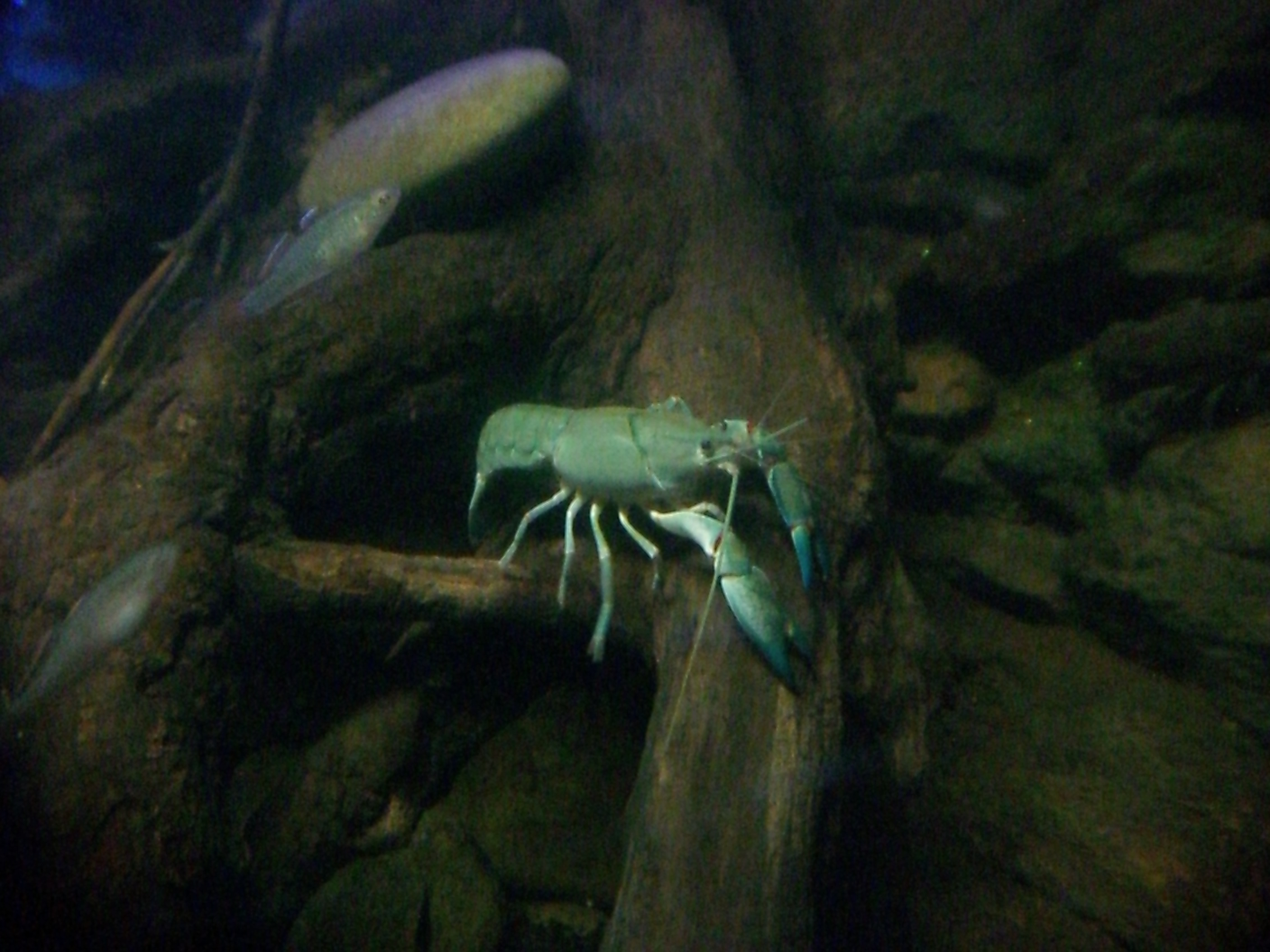
Yabbies: most common food source

Humans have been their greatest predator, with rakali requiring protection by legislation in 1938. They were hunted for their soft fur and considered a pest species. Populations are considered to have recovered and in all states considered of 'least concern' with the exception of Western Australia. Considered a pest in irrigation systems due to burrowing into banks and creating leaks, in a positive sense they have also been attributed to reduction of bank damage as they prey on freshwater crayfish (yabbies).

Predators of the rakali range from large fish and snakes when they are young and in the water, to birds of prey, foxes and cats. The rakali has the unusual ability to kill cane toads without being poisoned.

== Behaviour and life history ==
=== Nesting ===
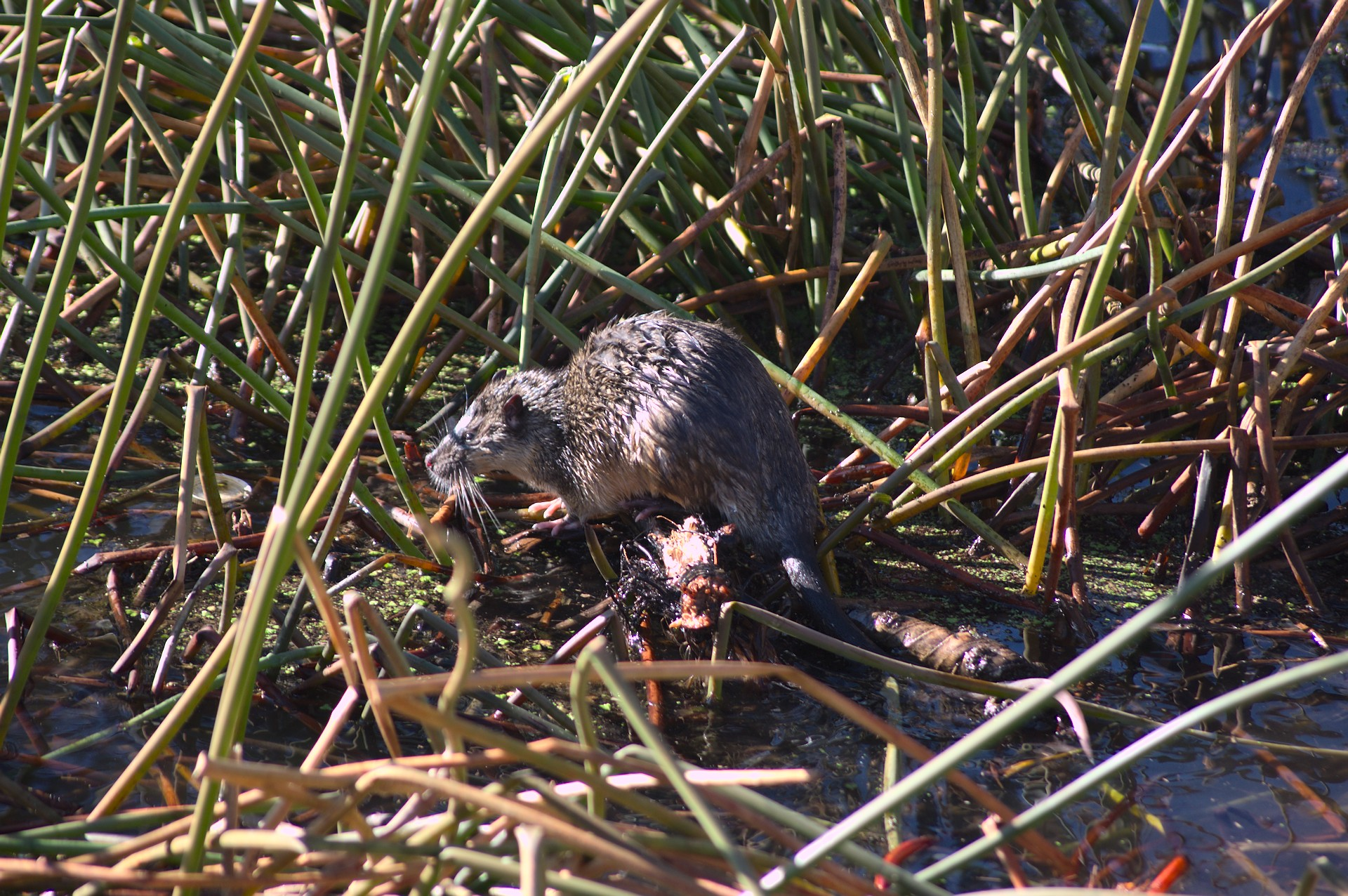
Reeds offer protection from predators.

The breeding behaviours are influenced by seasonal conditions. Under good seasonal conditions the solitary water rat comes together with their mate and may produce several litters (if young are removed will reproduce again within two months), but separate on the birth of the young. Limited information is available on home range, but suggests localised movement around the nesting sites and foraging areas. Rakali construct burrows dug into river banks but have also been documented building nests within sunken logs and reeds, in areas surrounded by roots and dense riparian vegetation for cover from predators.

There is increasing evidence of altered nesting habitat with rakali using artificial shelters of drainage pipes, exhaust pipes in moored boats, and rubber tyres in human-modified areas.

=== Breeding and growth ===
Females are able to reproduce from one year old or 425 g. Mating commences from late winter to early spring with a gestation period of 34 days. Rakali have four mammae with nipples located in the abdominal inguinal area enabling litters of an average of four to five are born from September to February and are suckled for four weeks. Sexual maturity develops at around twelve months but has been documented to commence at 4 months and breeding in the season of their birth. They are able to continue breeding until females are three and a half years old, and have a life expectancy of 3–4 years.

A territorial species, they are mostly solitary excluding the periods of mating and rearing their young. Their social organisation suggests adults are intra-sexually aggressive with their limited home range and overlapping sex and age classes. In captivity, only the dominant female in the hierarchy will successfully reproduce. Fecundity is lower than that of other murid species producing only four to five litters, but fertility is very high which can create high population growth in a period of favorable breeding conditions. This can be also influenced by the rapid growth in juveniles who can reach maturity and size within their first year.

H. chryogaster in comparison to the Rattus species mature late and have long reproductive lifecycles. They have lower reproductive output, delayed implantation, lactation anoestrus, winter anoestrus, longer estrous and longer gestation cycle. Their development occurs in stages associated with the eruption of incisors, hearing and eye-opening, eating solid foods, puberty and full reproductive maturity.

== Status ==
Although nationwide the populations appear stable there are individual populations facing a significant threat. Near threatened in Western Australia's Wheatbelt, urbanisation, salinisation, waterway degradation and pollution have all attributed to this status change. In the Northern Territory, Queensland, Tasmania and New South Wales they are classified as 'least concern'. In the Victorian Lake Wellington, Lake Victoria and Lake Tyers region, numbers have declined in the past fifty years attributed to commercial eel-fishing, predation, loss of habitat due to commercial development and poisoning from baiting programs placing this species at risk.
