= List of places on the Victorian Heritage Register in the City of Bayside =

This is a list of places on the Victorian Heritage Register in the City of Bayside in Victoria, Australia. The Victorian Heritage Register is maintained by the Heritage Council of Victoria.

As of September 2026, the Victorian Heritage Register listed the following 23 state-registered places within the City of Bayside:

Place name	Place #	Location	Suburb or Town	Co-ordinates	Built	State registered	Photo
Sir Thomas Bent statue	H2023	Nepean Hwy	Brighton	37°54′22″S 145°00′28″E	1913	13 February 2003	
Billilla	H1155	26 Halifax Street	Brighton	37°55′04″S 145°00′04″E	1878	8 April 1996	
Black Rock House	H0216	30–36 Ebden Ave	Black Rock	37°58′41″S 145°01′07″E	1856	9 October 1974	
Brighton Bathing Boxes	H2369	The Esplanade	Brighton	37°55′08″S 144°59′14″E	c. 1850	2 August 2018	
Brighton Beach railway station	H1077	1 The Esplanade	Brighton	37°55′35″S 144°59′21″E	1889	31 August 1995	
Brighton Municipal Offices	H1292	15 Boxshall St	Brighton	37°54′39″S 144°59′52″E	1959	6 February 1997	
Chevy Chase	H0125	201 Were St	Brighton	37°55′34″S 145°00′28″E	1881	28 November 1979	
Congregational Church (former; now Uniting Church)	H0724	15–17 Black St	Brighton	37°54′46″S 144°59′43″E	1875	22 April 1989	
David Godsell House	H2379	491 Balcombe Rd	Beaumaris	37°58′38″S 145°01′43″E	1960	24 May 2018	
Grant House	H2392	14 Pasadena Ave	Beaumaris	37°59′05″S 145°01′50″E	1956	29 August 2019	
Kamesburgh	H1186	74–104 North Rd	Brighton	37°53′57″S 144°59′52″E	1874	11 April 1996	
Kiora	H0621	81 South Rd	Brighton	37°55′41″S 144°59′52″E	1891	19 February 1986	
Kuring-Gai	H2414	257 St Kilda St	Brighton	37°54′31″S 144°59′11″E	1923	1 December 2022	
Masonic Centre	H2355	23 Abbott St	Sandringham	37°56′54″S 145°00′13″E	1931	16 June 2016	
Middle Brighton railway station	H1561	Church St	Brighton	37°54′54″S 144°59′47″E	1882	3 June 1999	
New Street railway gates (closed and automated)	H0269	New St	Brighton	37°55′55″S 144°59′36″E	1902	undated	
Old Melbourne Goal; Burial Markers	H2206	Off Beach Rd	Brighton	37°55′56″S 144°59′34″E	1929	14 May 2009	
The Pines	H2364	10 Middle Cres	Brighton	37°54′24″S 144°59′54″E	1866	12 January 2017	
Seccull House	H2406	23 North Rd	Brighton	37°53′54″S 144°59′28″E	1972	25 November 2021	
St Andrew's Church	H0124	15 St Andrew's St	Brighton	37°54′41″S 144°59′34″E	1857	13 May 2010	
St James' Church and Presbytery	H0748	73 North Rd	Brighton	37°53′54″S 144°59′48″E	1891	15 November 1989	
St John's the Less Anglican Church and schoolroom (former)	H1970	709 Hawthorne Rd	Brighton East	37°54′34″S 145°01′06″E	1840	undated	
St Kilda Street Bridge (Note: Also listed on the VHR in the City of Port Phillip.)	H2080	St Kilda St	Brighton	37°53′09″S 144°59′30″E	1905	undated (Note: Prior to 2015, based on the nomination report for an Engineering Heritage Marker by Engineers Australia.)	
