= St James' Church, Brighton =

Heritage-listed church building in Melbourne, Victoria, Australia

- St James' Catholic Church, Gardenvale
- Location of the church in Greater Metropolitan Melbourne
- St James' Church, Brighton
- 37°53′54″S 144°59′48″E
- Location: 73 North Road, Brighton, City of Bayside, Melbourne, Victoria
- Country: Australia
- Denomination: Roman Catholic
- Sui iuris church: Latin Church
- Website: melbcatholic.org/emmaus

History
- Status: Parish church
- Founded: 1848 (as a parish)
- Founder: Rev'd Matthew Carey
- Dedication: James the Great
- Dedicated: 1892

Architecture
- Functional status: Active
- Architects: Edgar J. Henderson (1891); Schreiber and Jorgensen (1924)
- Architectural type: Church
- Style: Gothic Revival
- Completed: 1891; 135 years ago

Specifications
- Materials: Bricks; timber; stained glass; marble; ceramic tiles

Administration
- Archdiocese: Melbourne
- Parish: Emmaus: Brighton, Brighton East & Gardenvale

Clergy
- Priest: Fr Ian Ranson

Victorian Heritage Register
- Official name: St James Church and Presbytery
- Type: Registered place
- Designated: 15 November 1989
- Reference no.: H0748
- Heritage overlay no.: HO327
- Category: Religion

Register of the National Estate
- Official name: St James Catholic Church
- Type: Defunct register
- Designated: undated
- Reference no.: 15506

The St James' Church, Brighton, also known as St James' Catholic Church, Gardenvale, is a Catholic church, located at 73 North Road in Brighton, in the City of Bayside, in the south eastern suburbs of Melbourne, in Victoria, Australia.

Built in 1891 on the traditional lands of the Bunurong people, the church building and its presbytery were added to the Victorian Heritage Register on 15 November 1989; and was also added to non-statutory lists by the Victorian branch of the National Trust on 10 May 1984 and the now defunct Register of the National Estate on an unknown date.

== Description ==
The first Catholic church in the southern region of Melbourne was St Patrick's, Brighton – a wooden building facing Centre Road opened in 1848. The first mention of a building on the North Road site was of a brick presbytery in 1854, as the home for the pastor of the "Mission of Brighton". This vast mission area covered all the territory south of the Yarra from Emerald Hill to the Mornington Peninsula and to the east into Gippsland. It is thought that some of the 1850s building survives in the present presbytery (or rectory) which was extended in 1889 and later. The wooden church building was replaced with a more substantial brick building and renamed St Finbar's, as the patronage of St Patrick was claimed for the Melbourne cathedral.

In 1876, the Rev'd Matthew Carey was appointed to the Mission of Brighton; and in 1882, he constructed a temporary wooden building facing North Road that was used as a church on Sundays and a schoolhouse on weekdays. In 1883 the Mission was divided up into parishes and Fr Carey's was named Elsternwick, under the patronage of St James the Great. Extensions were made in 1889, necessitated by an increase in school pupils.

Construction of the present church commenced in 1891 and included the present eastern portion, as far as the transepts, and cost £6,000. It was dedicated to St James and blessed by Dr Reville, the Co-adjutor Bishop of Sandhurst, in 1892. The designing architect was Melbourne born Edgar J. Henderson, who was responsible for the design of a number of Catholic churches, presbyteries and convents during the late 1880s and early 1890s.

The 1904 Melbourne and Metropolitan Board of Works (MMBW) plan shows St James as part of an important church precinct with the Star of the Sea Convent on its northern side and St Andrew's Presbyterian church complex to the west. The 1906 MMBW plan indicates the elaborate Victorian design of the garden associated with the presbytery. During the 1920s alterations and additions were made to the church and its rectory designed by the architectural firm of Schreiber and Jorgensen. In 1924 the temporary timber section at the rear of the church was replaced by the transepts, sanctuary and chancel at a cost of c.£14,000. The nave was extended and two side chapels were built. In the early 1930s decorative tiling was commissioned for the sanctuary and side altars.

The nave is of interest for its facade, with traceried window, comparable to Henderson's earlier design for St Mary's Cathedral, Sale and the large sexfoil clerestory windows. Also of architectural importance is the unusually elaborate 1934 decoration of the chancel with Roman mosaic flooring, opus sectile tiling and marble altars and rails.

The pipe organ, built by Alfred Fuller of Kew, installed in 1891, placed centrally in the rear gallery, is a rare example of his work; and was restored in 2001.

== See also ==
- Architecture of Melbourne
- List of places on the Victorian Heritage Register in the City of Bayside
