= St John's the Less Anglican Church =

Heritage-listed former church in Melbourne, Victoria, Australia

St John's the Less Anglican Church (former)
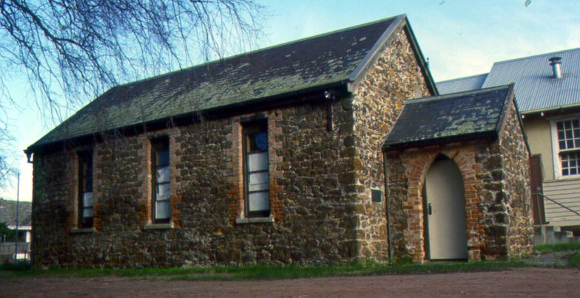
- The former church in 2012

- Location of the former church in Greater Metropolitan Melbourne
- St John's the Less Anglican Church (former)
- 37°54′34″S 145°01′06″E
- Location: 709 Hawthorne Road, Brighton East, City of Bayside, Melbourne, Victoria
- Country: Australia
- Previous denomination: Anglican

History
- Former name: St John's Anglican Church
- Founded: 1 February 1850

Architecture
- Functional status: Preserved
- Architectural type: Church / School
- Style: Gothic Revival
- Completed: 1840; 186 years ago
- Closed: 1890 (as a church)

Specifications
- Capacity: 120 worshippers
- Materials: Bluestone; timber; slate

Administration
- Diocese: Melbourne

Victorian Heritage Register
- Official name: St John's the Less Anglican Church and Schoolroom (former)
- Type: Registered place
- Designated: undated
- Reference no.: H1970
- Heritage overlay no.: HO203
- Categories: Education; Religion

Register of the National Estate
- Official name: St John's the Less Anglican Church and schoolroom
- Type: Defunct register
- Designated: undated
- Reference no.: 103735

St John's the Less Anglican Church is a former Anglican church and former schoolhouse building, located at 709 Hawthorne Road, situated in the grounds of Vasey RSL Care, in Brighton East, in the City of Bayside, in the south eastern suburbs of Melbourne, in Victoria, Australia. Built in 1840 on the traditional lands of the Bunurong people, the building is one of the oldest religious and educational buildings in Victoria.

The former church and school building was added to the Victorian Heritage Register on an unknown date in recognition of its historical and architectural significance; and was also added to non-statutory lists by the Victorian branch of the National Trust on 12 February 1981 and the now defunct Register of the National Estate on an unknown date.

The church building was replaced by a new church in 1890; and the building was subsequently used as a Sunday school.

== Description ==
The former Anglican church of St John's and its schoolroom is one of the oldest religious and educational buildings in Victoria, having been constructed before the 1851 separation of the Colony of Victoria from the Colony of New South Wales . It is also one of the earliest known surviving buildings from the pioneering days of Brighton, Melbourne's oldest satellite settlement. It is also the earliest surviving Anglican school building in Melbourne.

St John's Anglican Church and schoolroom, designed to seat about 120 people, was opened on 1 February 1850 to serve the pioneer agricultural settlement around the Elster Creek at Little Brighton (now East Brighton). Construction of the humble building, using local ironstone and volunteer labour was assisted by a grant of £35 from the Melbourne Diocesan Society. Later named St John's the Less, to distinguish it from the larger Church of St John built in East Brighton (now Bentleigh), the building was continuously used for worship until replaced by a new brick church in 1890. It then became a Sunday School for many years. The building has a small entrance porch and the slate roof and timber boarded ceiling is supported on exposed king post trusses. A fireplace on the south wall is boarded over and the top of the chimney was removed.

The former Anglican church of St John's the Less and schoolroom is important to the history of education in Victoria as a rare surviving example of a pre-separation and pre-Victorian gold rush school building, and as the earliest extant school building in Brighton. Its construction, at the predominantly Protestant settlement of Brighton, predated the establishment of a National Board of Education which aimed to acknowledge the diversity of religious and cultural affiliations in Australia and to minimise sectarian animosities.

The former church of St John's the Less and schoolroom is architecturally important as a representative example of the simple pioneer construction methods and techniques of the 1840s using local labour and locally quarried ironstone.

== See also ==
- Architecture of Melbourne
- List of Anglican churches in Melbourne
- List of places on the Victorian Heritage Register in the City of Bayside
