= New Street railway gates =

Heritage-listed former level crossing in Melbourne, Victoria, Australia

- Location of the former gates in Greater Metropolitan Melbourne

General information
- Status: Closed (2010); Automated as boom barriers (2013)
- Type: Manually-operated railway gates (1902–2010)
- Architectural style: Federation
- Location: New Street, Sandringham railway line, Brighton, City of Bayside, Melbourne, Victoria, Australia
- Coordinates: 37°55′55″S 144°59′36″E
- Completed: 1902; 124 years ago
- Closed: 2010 (as manually operated)

Technical details
- Material: Timber; weatherboard; corrugated iron

Victorian Heritage Register
- Official name: New Street railway gates
- Type: Registered place
- Designated: undated
- Reference no.: H0269
- Heritage overlay no.: HO769
- Category: Transport - Rail

The New Street railway gates are former manually-operated railway gates and associated rail infrastructure that were located on New Street, on the Sandringham line, in Brighton, in the City of Bayside, in the south eastern suburbs of Melbourne, in Victoria, Australia. The manual gates – the last of their type in Victoria – operated between 1902 until their closure in 2010, following an accident. The gates were subsequently automated and reopened in 2013.

Built on the traditional lands of the Bunurong people, the railway gates were added to the Victorian Heritage Register in recognition of its historical and social significance; and was also added to a non-statutory list by the Victorian branch of the National Trust on 29 January 2007.

== Description ==
The former New Street Railway Gates were located at the intersection of New Street and the Sandringham railway line, just inland of the intersection of New Street and Beach Road, and between the Brighton Beach and Hampton railway stations. The railway gates were hand-operated and were kept open for road traffic. There was a pair of timber gates on each side, flanked by lengths of timber picket fencing and with pedestrian gates on the north side.

The gate-keeper's cabin on the north was a small timber-framed weatherboard structure with gabled corrugated iron roof and a single doorway facing the track. A small brick fireplace and chimney were located opposite the door. The signal levers were housed in an open-sided timber lean-to off the cabin on the crossing side. The weatherboard outhouse with small gable roof was at the other side of the cabin.

In 1887, the Brighton Beach railway line was extended with a single track to Sandringham, via Hampton station. The line was duplicated in 1902, and the former hand-operated gate layout probably dates from that time. There were five level crossings with gatekeeper's houses on the line, and as this caused excessive expense, the number of gatekeeper's houses was reduced and some of the crossings closed. From mid-1892 over 900 level crossings across Victoria had gates and gatehouses removed. Most of the remaining hand-operated gates were in inner suburban areas, with a handful at the major country stations.

The addition of signals at crossings began in 1903 with New Street receiving them in 1919. Pedestrian gates were introduced from the 1920s. Mechanically operated gates (sector gates) operated by a wheel from a distance, usually at the signal box, were introduced at inner suburban stations from 1879, and eighty were introduced up to 1935, at which time there were over sixty hand-operated gates in Melbourne. Until the 1930s hand-operated gates were kept open for trains rather than road traffic. Boom barriers were introduced from 1956. Following continuing installation of booms and grade separations, only sixteen hand-operated gates remained in the Melbourne suburbs by 1988. Most of these were on the Upfield railway line. The hand-operated gates at Brighton were the last manual gates in operation, although some of the gates and cabins remain in various locations.

=== Replacement and automation ===
In 2007, the swing gates were hit by a train, causing significant damage. In 2010, the manually-operated railway gates were closed by the Brumby government, and they planned to re-open the level crossing, initially proposed with an underpass, and then with barriers. The project, which cost $4.4 million, included the replacement of the hand-operated gates with boom barriers, installation of flashing lights and bells, and a wider pedestrian crossing. It was opened in 2013 by Louise Asher, the Member for Brighton.

== See also ==
- Architecture of Melbourne
- Level crossings by country
- List of places on the Victorian Heritage Register in the City of Bayside
