= Ku-ring-gai (disambiguation) =

The Kuringgai (Ku-ring-gai, Guringai) is a name applied (possibly erroneously) to a group consisting of several diverse indigenous Australian people. Things named after this group include:

- Electoral district of Ku-ring-gai
- Hornsby Ku-ring-gai Hospital
- Ku-ring-gai Chase National Park
- Ku-ring-gai Creative Arts High School
- Ku-ring-gai Council
- Kuring-Gai (house), a heritage-listed house in Brighton, Melbourne, Victoria
- Mount Ku-ring-gai, New South Wales
- SS Kuring-gai, a former steam ferry on the Sydney to Manly run
