= Old Melbourne Gaol Burial Markers =

Heritage-listed sea wall and archaeological site in Melbourne, Victoria, Australia

- Location of the seawall in Greater Metropolitan Melbourne

General information
- Status: Completed
- Type: Sea wall; Cemetery; Archaeological site
- Location: Off Beach Road, from Brighton towards Beaumaris, City of Bayside, Melbourne, Victoria, Australia
- Coordinates: 37°55′56″S 144°59′34″E
- Year built: from 1929–c. 1939
- Completed: 1929; 97 years ago

Technical details
- Material: Bluestone; concrete

Design and construction
- Developer: Public Works Department (Victoria)

Victorian Heritage Register
- Official name: Old Melbourne Gaol Burial Markers
- Type: Registered place; Registered archaeological place
- Designated: 14 May 2009
- Reference no.: H2206
- Heritage overlay no.: HO768
- Categories: Law Enforcement; Cemeteries and Burial Sites

The Old Melbourne Gaol Burial Markers is a bluestone sea wall and archeological site, located off Beach Road, from Brighton towards Beaumaris, in the City of Bayside, in the south eastern suburbs of Melbourne, in Victoria, Australia. The wall was built from 1929 to the late 1930s, as a project initiated to reuse some of the bluestone wall from the Old Melbourne Gaol, that had closed in 1924, to partly to save the Brighton Beach from erosion, and to generate employment during the Great Depression. The sea wall contains some of the grave-markers of prisoners who were executed at the former gaol after 1880.

Built on the traditional lands of the Bunurong people, the wall was added to the Victorian Heritage Register on 14 May 2009 in recognition of its historical and archaeological significance.

== Description ==
The Old Melbourne Gaol was constructed from 1839, and during its operation as a prison between 1845 and 1924, it held and executed some of Australia's most notorious criminals, including bushranger Ned Kelly and serial killer Frederick Bailey Deeming. In total, 133 people were executed by hanging at the former gaol. Following its closure on 1 July 1924 and to make way for the development of the Working Men’s College, some of the former burial grounds and prison walls were dismantled and relocated. Most of the known graves were relocated to HM Prison Pentridge, and part of the former gaol was preserved as a history museum.

The bluestone sea wall along the Brighton Beach foreshore contains some grave-marked blocks that originally formed part of the former gaol. The bluestone blocks were reused in the construction of the sea wall, following the closure of the gaol and the dismantling of some walls in the 1920s and in 1937. Some of the bluestones are carved with the initials and date of execution of former inmates, who were hanged and buried at the former gaol. Executed inmates at the gaol were not given tombstones. However, from c. 1880, their burial locations were marked by the carving of their initials and dates of execution into the bluestone blocks directly adjacent to their burial sites.

The Brighton Beach sea wall contains the largest number (eight) of known former Old Melbourne Gaol bluestone burial markers. It is likely that other markers exist in the sea wall between Wellington Street, Brighton, to Second Street, Black Rock, and towards Beaumaris. The bluestone blocks from the Brighton Beach foreshore towards Beaumaris contain the initials of eight executed inmates and included Philipi Castillo, who was executed on 16 September 1889; John Wilson, on 23 March 1891; Joseph Pfeffer, on 29 April 1912; John Conder, on 28 March 1893; Fatta Chand, on 27 April 1891; and William Colston, on 24 August 1891.

Whilst initially six markers were understood to have been part of the sea wall, in 2011 the Public Record Office Victoria published an image of a grave marker located in the sea wall at Beaumaris for Alfred Archer, executed on 21 November 1898; and in 2016, a grave marker for Martha Needle, executed on 22 October 1894, was discovered after being buried by metres of sand, located adjacent to the sea wall at Brighton Beach, near Wellington Street.

The sea wall along the Brighton Beach foreshore was constructed as part of a Department of Public Works initiative established to during the Great Depression to address unemployment and an attempt to reduce sand erosion on the beach.

== See also ==
- List of places on the Victorian Heritage Register in the City of Bayside
