= Masonic Centre, Sandringham =

Building in Melbourne, Australia

Masonic Centre
- Location of the centre in Greater Metropolitan Melbourne
- Former names: Sandringham Masonic Hall

General information
- Status: Completed
- Type: Masonic lodge (1931–2017); Community centre (since 2017– )
- Architectural style: Egyptian Revival
- Location: 23 Abbott Street, Sandringham, City of Bayside, Melbourne, Victoria, Australia
- Coordinates: 37°56′54″S 145°00′13″E
- Groundbreaking: 27 May 1931
- Completed: 1931; 95 years ago
- Inaugurated: 29 October 1931
- Client: United Grand Lodge of Victoria
- Owner: United Grand Lodge of Victoria (1931–2017); City of Bayside (since 2017)

Technical details
- Material: Rendered bricks; timber; tiles

Design and construction
- Architect: Gordon J. Sutherland

Victorian Heritage Register
- Official name: Sandringham Masonic Centre
- Type: Registered place
- Criteria: a., b., e.
- Designated: 16 June 2016
- Reference no.: H2355
- Heritage overlay no.: HO772
- Category: Community Facilities

The Masonic Centre is a former Masonic lodge, now community centre, located at 23 Abbott Street in Sandringham, in the City of Bayside, in the south eastern suburbs of Melbourne, in Victoria, Australia.

Built in 1931 on the traditional lands of the Wurundjeri people, the lodge was added to the Victorian Heritage Register on 16 June 2016 in recognition of its historical, architectural, and aesthetic significance.

== History ==
=== Freemasonry in Victoria ===
The first lodge meeting in Victoria was held in 1839. The United Grand Lodge of Victoria was established in 1889, bringing together lodges which had previously worked under separate constitutions and this resulted in increased numbers of suburban lodges. A large increase in the popularity of freemasonry in Victoria in the early 1920s resulted in the formation of many suburban and country lodges and the necessity for meeting places. More than twelve masonic halls were built in Victoria between 1922 and 1925, including halls at Brunswick, Greensborough, Ivanhoe, Oakleigh, Prahran, Avoca, Colac, Kaniva, Maffra, Nagambie, Wycheproof and Yarrawonga.

=== Sandringham site ===
The Sandringham Masonic Hall was built in 1931 to provide a purpose-built facility for five Masonic lodges operating in the locality. The first of these, Sandringham Lodge No 220, was founded in 1912. The site in Abbott Street, Sandringham was acquired by the newly formed Sandringham District Hall Co Ltd in 1924 and plans for a masonic hall were prepared by architect Gordon J. Sutherland. On 27 May 1931 the foundation stone for the Sandringham Masonic Hall was laid by Lord Somers in his capacity as Grand Master of the United Grand Lodge of Victoria. Somers was, at the time, also the Governor of Victoria.

At its peak the Sandringham Masonic Hall provided a meeting place for fourteen lodges and the building was enlarged in 1956 to provide for increasing membership.

The building was sold by the Freemasons in 2017 and purchased by the City of Bayside for use as a community centre.

== Description ==
The Sandringham Masonic Hall is a two-storey rendered brick building designed in an Egyptian Revival style. It is a large parapeted building with a concealed gabled roof above the main lodge room and a symmetrical front facade. The Egyptian Revival style is evident in the dominant projecting two storey central front porch which contains cavetto cornices, columns with palmiform capitals, papyrus-bundle capitals, side grilles with stylised columns, two-winged solar discs and two flanking obelisks. Side elevations contain small window openings and a rear brick addition continues the two-storey form of the original building.

The Sandringham Masonic Hall consists of a main hall and entrance foyer at ground level and a lodge room and foyer at first floor level. Panelled ceilings, wall pilasters, window and door frames and stained glass windows are decorated with Egyptian-themed motifs, including palmette and papyrus mouldings, astrological symbols, winged solar discs and pentangles. Masonic symbols, such as the compass and square, are incorporated into the decorative scheme. The former lodge room contains original light fittings, ritual furniture, and raised side platforms with timber bench seating. The 1956 addition at the rear of the building contains a small lodge room at the upper level.

== See also ==
- Architecture of Melbourne
- List of Masonic buildings
- List of places on the Victorian Heritage Register in the City of Bayside
