= Kiora (house) =

Heritage-listed house in Melbourne, Victoria, Australia

- Location of the house in Greater Metropolitan Melbourne

General information
- Status: Completed
- Type: House
- Architectural style: Late Victorian; Picturesque
- Location: 81–83 South Road, Brighton, City of Bayside, Melbourne, Victoria, Australia
- Coordinates: 37°55′41″S 144°59′52″E
- Completed: 1891; 135 years ago
- Client: John Russell Brown
- Owner: John Russell Brown

Technical details
- Material: Bricks; timber; slate; tiles; stucco; cast iron
- Floor area: 1,345 m^{2} (14,480 sq ft)
- Grounds: 2,077 m^{2} (22,360 sq ft)

Design and construction
- Architect: John Russell Brown (atrib.)

Victorian Heritage Register
- Official name: Kiora
- Type: Registered place
- Designated: 19 February 1986
- Reference no.: H0621
- Heritage overlay no.: HO207
- Categories: Education; Health Services; Residential buildings (private)

Register of the National Estate
- Official name: Kiora
- Type: Defunct register
- Designated: 27 October 1998
- Reference no.: 7608

Kiora is a house located at 81–83 South Road in Brighton, in the City of Bayside, in the south eastern suburbs of Melbourne, in Victoria, Australia.

Built in 1891 on the traditional lands of the Bunurong people, the house was added to the Victorian Heritage Register on 19 February 1986 in recognition of its architectural and historical significance; and was also added to a non-statutory and now defunct Register of the National Estate on 27 October 1998.

== History ==
Kiora was built in 1891 at the very end of Melbourne's land boom. It is an outstanding example of the boom-style mansions characteristic of that hectic time. The first owner, and almost certainly the designer, was John Russell Brown, an architect with the Public Works Department between 1877 and 1900. He was responsible for many important public buildings – with the Flemington Post Office of 1888 perhaps his most successful. His designs were characterised by elaborate ornamentation and were sometimes even absurdly decorative.

In 1892 a new owner appears in the rate books, Abram Crawford, a successful Scottish merchant. In a move typical of the Depression which followed the boom, Crawford's wife, Margaret, became the owner in 1896. Following the 1901 death of Margaret Glendinning Crawford, ownership of the property was transferred back to her husband. The owners in 1912 were listed as the late J. J. Hammond and his wife.

From about 1913, Kiora became an exclusive girls' school known as Norfolk House. It was described in March 1918 as a children's hostel. It then became the home of a veterinary surgeon. It was subsequently subdivided to become the Wahroonga Flats.

Listed for the first time in forty years, the 1,345-square-metre (14,480 sq ft) house was sold for A$6.5 million in December 2023.

== Description ==
Several architectural sources can be identified. The verandah (now demolished) was particularly notable and probably derived from the contemporary American Stick style . The plan of Kiora was also unusual with its central octagonal hall. Parallels exist with the work of Lloyd Tayler, a prominent architect in private practice, who lived in Brighton. Tayler's houses were characterised by, among other things, unusual planning and central skylights. The sky-light at Kiora is the largest example known and may be influenced by Tayler's work.

Kiora is a late Victorian-era boom-style mansion that incorporated such picturesque elements as Gothic drip moulds and French Chateau conical and mansard roof forms. The basically two-storey brick building consists of two projecting gable ended wings, with third floors in the roof sections and a four-storey tower and conical roofed bayed section being the principal elements linking the two wings. The body bricks are blacks, relieved with reds with painted black string courses, stuccoed dressings, drip moulds and bracketed frieze. Each window has cream borders with incised stucco keystones. The slate roof is patterned, whilst the vertical proportions of the building are emphasised by the narrow windows. An encaustic tiled terrace links the wings at ground level. The entrance hall has a timber vaulted ceiling.

== See also ==
- Architecture of Melbourne
- List of places on the Victorian Heritage Register in the City of Bayside
