= Brighton Municipal Offices =

Heritage-listed government building in Melbourne, Victoria, Australia

- Location of the Council building in Greater Metropolitan Melbourne

General information
- Status: Completed
- Type: Local government administration
- Architectural style: International style
- Location: 15 Boxshall Street, Brighton, City of Frankston, Melbourne, Victoria, Australia
- Coordinates: 37°54′39″S 144°59′52″E
- Year built: 1959–1961
- Groundbreaking: 13 February 1959
- Completed: 1961; 65 years ago
- Opened: 21 July 1961
- Owner: City of Bayside

Technical details
- Material: Red bricks

Design and construction
- Architect: Kevin Knight
- Architecture firm: Oakley and Parkes
- Engineer: John Connell and Associates
- Other designers: Grant Featherston (interior); Alnis Ansons (ceramic mural)
- Main contractor: Prentice Builders Pty Ltd

Victorian Heritage Register
- Official name: Brighton Municipal Offices
- Type: Registered place; Registered object integral to a registered place
- Designated: 6 February 1997
- Reference no.: H1292
- Heritage overlay no.: HO83
- Category: Government and Administration

The Brighton Municipal Offices is a local government administration building located at 15 Boxshall Street in Brighton, in the City of Bayside, in the south eastern suburbs of Melbourne, in Victoria, Australia.

Built between 1959 and 1961 on the traditional lands of the Bunurong people, the administration building was added to the Victorian Heritage Register on 6 February 1997 in recognition of its aesthetic, historic, and architectural importance; and was also added to a non-statutory list by the Victorian branch of the National Trust on 5 December 1994.

== History ==
The Brighton Municipal Offices in Boxshall Street were designed by Kevin Knight of Oakley and Parkes with the engineers John Connell and Associates and were erected by Prentice Builders Pty Ltd., the foundation stone being laid on 13 February 1959. The interior decoration and furniture was by Grant Featherston. The building was opened on 21 July 1961.

With local council amalgamations in the late 1990s, the Brighton Civic Centre became surplus to requirements when the new City of Bayside consolidated its corporate headquarters at nearby Sandringham. While the foyers and office areas at Brighton were sympathetically re-purposed as a local library, the council chamber was retained virtually unaltered and remains in use to this day for official gatherings.

== Description ==
The circular foyer, Council Chamber, and two circular meeting rooms designed by Grant Featherston including their extant furniture and light fittings, are of aesthetic and historic importance as an intact example of interior design in Victoria of the late 1950's, and as an important work of Grant Featherston, a leading Australian industrial designer of the 1950's and 1960's. Grant Featherston earned for his profession a popular acceptance unique in the history of the industrial design movement in Australia.

The Brighton Municipal Offices are of architectural importance as an expression of the influence in Australia of the work of internationally renowned American architect Frank Lloyd Wright. The building, with its prominent curved and tapering 'drum' form recalls Wright's design for the Guggenheim Museum, in New York City, successfully combines the different curved and planar forms and integrates the landscaping into the building fabric through use of planter retaining walls. The building represents a successful translation of the organic International style into a suburban public building in Victoria.

== See also ==
- Architecture of Melbourne
- List of city and town halls
- List of places on the Victorian Heritage Register in the City of Bayside
