= Kuring-Gai (house) =

Heritage-listed house in Melbourne, Victoria, Australia

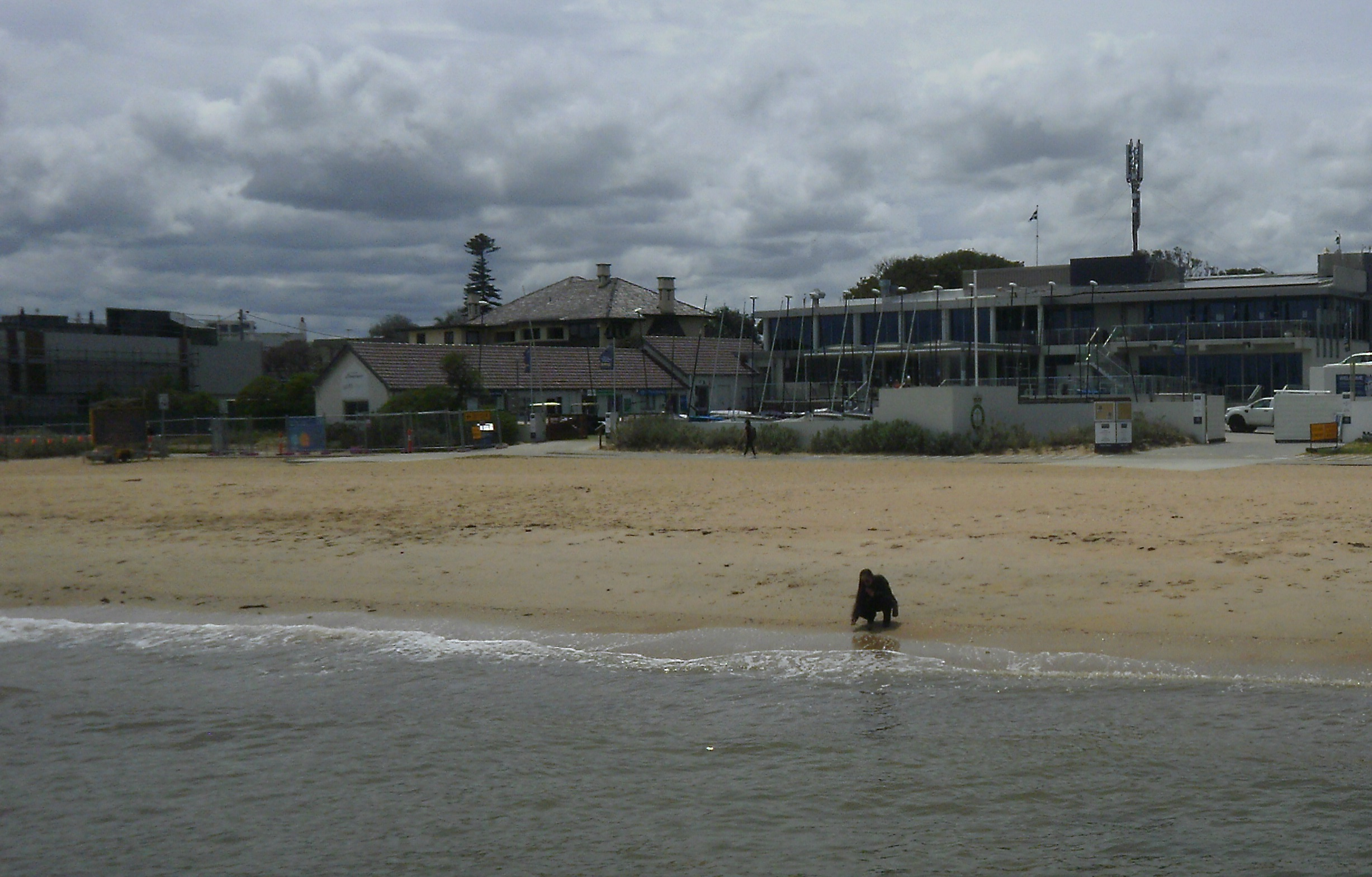
- An image of the Royal Brighton Yacht Club in November 2021, viewed from the beach, with Kuring-Gai, partially obscured, on the left

- Location of the house in Greater Metropolitan Melbourne
- Alternative names: Majellan House (1963–2025)
- Etymology: Kuringgai

General information
- Status: Completed
- Type: House
- Architectural style: Federation Arts and Crafts; Inter-war Californian Bungalow; Inter-war Georgian Revival; Inter-war Spanish Mission / Mediterranean
- Location: 257 St Kilda Street, Brighton, City of Bayside, Melbourne, Victoria, Australia
- Coordinates: 37°54′31″S 144°59′11″E
- Year built: 1923–1924
- Completed: 1924; 102 years ago
- Client: William and Florence Carr
- Owner: William and Florence Carr (1923–1963); Redemptorists (1963–2025)

Technical details
- Material: Stone rubble; rendered brick; terracotta tiles; marbled stained glass
- Floor count: 2 (Note: Sometimes listed as three storeys.)
- Grounds: 3,348 m^{2} (36,040 sq ft)

Design and construction
- Architect: Cedric Heise Ballantyne

Victorian Heritage Register
- Official name: Kuring-Gai
- Type: Registered place
- Criteria: a., d.
- Designated: 1 December 2022
- Reference no.: H2414
- Categories: Religion; Residential buildings (private)

Kuring-Gai, later known as Majellan House, is a house located at 257 St Kilda Street in Brighton, in the City of Bayside, in the south eastern suburbs of Melbourne, in Victoria, Australia. Used as a house until 1963, the building was acquired by a Roman Catholic religious order and then sold as a residence in 2025.

Built between 1923 and 1924 on the traditional lands of the Bunurong people, the house was added to the Victorian Heritage Register on 1 December 2022 in recognition of its historical and architectural significance.

== History ==
Kuring-gai was commissioned by William Bertram Carr (1883-1961), director of W. B. Carr Constructions Pty Ltd, a leading Melbourne firm of engineering contractors in the early 1920s. At the time Cedric Ballantyne was one of Melbourne's leading residential architects. Carr had purchased a large beachside allotment in St Kilda Street, and Ballantyne proposed an imposing two-storey plus basement California bungalow-style residence with a broad verandah overlooking Port Phillip Bay.

Kuring-gai was featured in the October 1925 edition of The Australian Home Beautiful. This article reproduced the architects’ landscape plan, with a sunken formal garden south of the main house, a rear garden pavilion, a tennis court, and a bathing box opening directly onto the beach. A later design for a garden on the north side of the house by Edna Walling no longer exists as it appears that this portion of the allotment was taken to construct Mytton Grove.

William Carr and his wife, Florence, remained in Kuring-gai for several decades and were frequent hosts for various social events. Following William's death in 1961, and Florence's death in 1963, the house was purchased for £32,000 by the Redemptorists, a Roman Catholic religious order, and subsequently renamed as Majellan House, and used as a base for the Redemptorist's media operations and as a residence. While the function of some of the rooms has been altered, very few physical changes were made to the building.

Set on 3,348 square metres (36,040 sq ft), located adjacent to the Royal Brighton Yacht Club with frontage to Brighton Beach, the Redemptorists listed the house for sale in November 2021; at the time, not included on the Victorian Heritage Register. However, a month later, the Heritage Council of Victoria served an Interim Protection Order to the property, the property was added to the Register in December 2022, and the Redemptorists sold the heritage-listed property in June 2024 for A$18 million.

== Description ==
Significant elements of the house include the relationship of the residence within its formal landscaped surrounds and bayside location; the overall form and footprint of the building and general internal layout; distinctive and intact 1920s internal elements, such as the floorboards, granolithic/terrazzo and tiled surfaces, coffered and decorative plaster ceilings, cornices, joinery, the main and secondary staircase, fireplaces (including the inglenook), timber panelling and joinery, built in timber furniture, doors, bathroom fittings and fixtures, and the staff indicator board (kitchen); and landscape elements and layout associated with the place's formative phase, including the stone entrance piers, circular carriageway, northern driveway, paving, basalt retaining walls, the southern and rear sunken garden, and some mature exotic trees.

The built and garden character of the place was celebrated in The Australian Home Beautiful – an important architectural periodical – around the time of its construction and in subsequent editions (the mid-1960s and mid-1990s). This coverage reflected continued broader awareness of the place and provides ample evidence of its high level of integrity. Such evidence, alongside tangible elements, allows the historical associations of Kuring-gai to be understood and appreciated with greater clarity than in other equivalent places.

Kuring-gai is architecturally significant as a substantial, fine and remarkably intact example of an interwar mansion. The design illustrates – at a grand level – Ballantyne's careful eclectic approach, which during the 1920s drew from multiple then popular stylistic sources. The outcome is a striking residence with a prevailing North American bungalow character, unusual for a two-storey building in Victoria, which is combined with a general Arts and Crafts Movement character as well as Georgian Revival and Spanish Mission/Mediterranean influences. The interior is also closely considered and lavishly finished, accentuating the place's prestigiousness and further distinguishing it from other examples of its class. Kuring-gai is complemented by its siting within formally landscaped grounds that retain several original or early features.

== See also ==
- Architecture of Melbourne
- List of places on the Victorian Heritage Register in the City of Bayside
