= Brighton, Victoria =

Suburb of Melbourne

Brighton
- Suburb
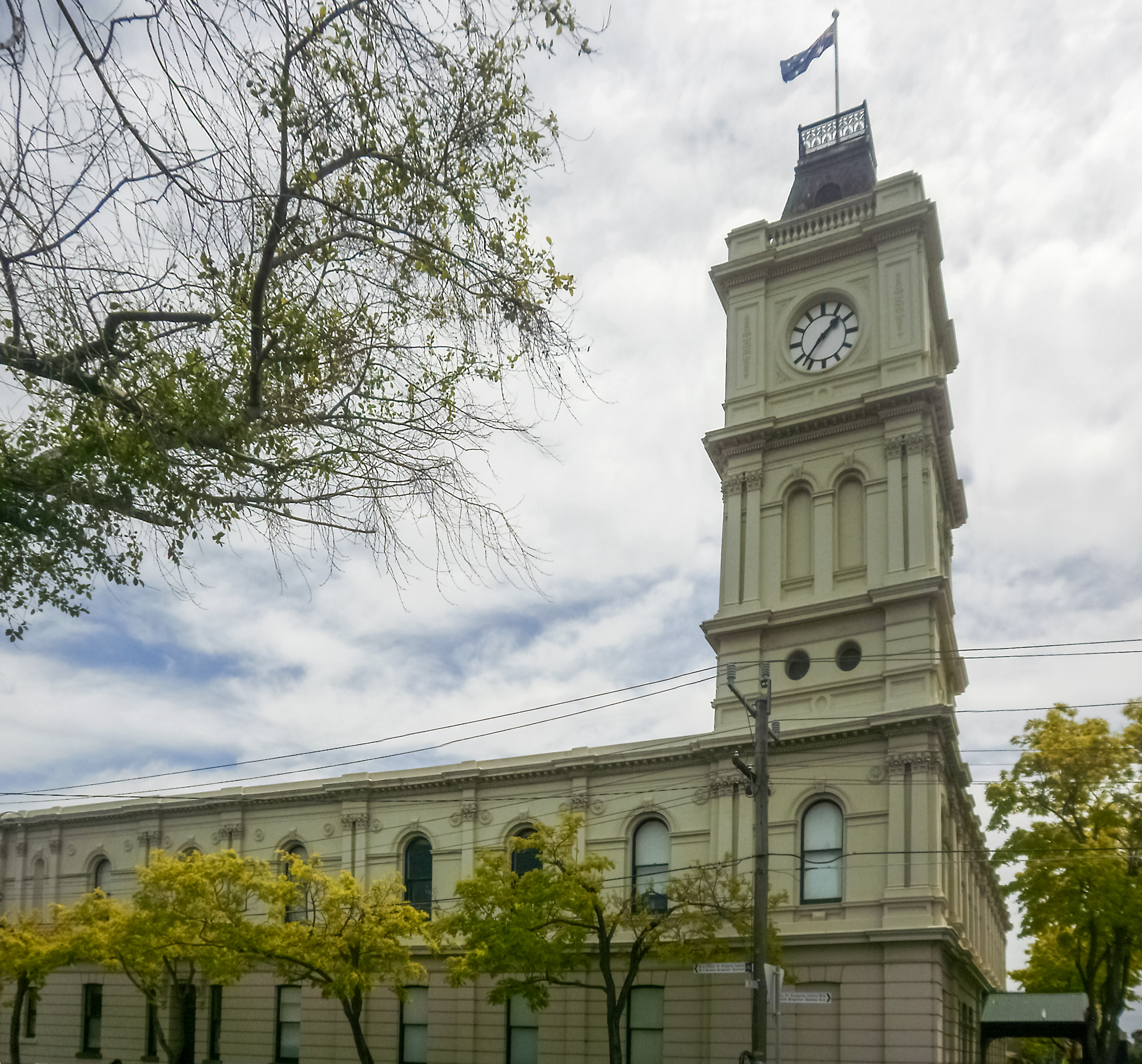
- Brighton Town Hall

- Interactive map of Brighton
- Coordinates: 37.905°S 144.996°E
- Country: Australia
- State: Victoria
- City: Melbourne
- LGA: City of Bayside
- Location: 11 km (6.8 mi) from Melbourne
- Established: 1840

Government
  - State electorate: Brighton
  - Federal division: Goldstein

Area
  - Total: 8.2 km^{2} (3.2 sq mi)
- Elevation: 15 m (49 ft)

Population
  - Total: 23,252 (2021 census)
  - Density: 2,836/km^{2} (7,340/sq mi)
- Postcode: 3186
Suburbs around Brighton
Port Phillip	Elwood	Elsternwick
Port Phillip	Brighton	Brighton East
Port Phillip	Hampton	Hampton

Brighton is a suburb in Melbourne, Victoria, Australia, 11 km south-east of Melbourne's Central Business District, located within the City of Bayside local government area. Brighton recorded a population of 23,252 at the 2021 census.

Brighton is named after Brighton in England.

== History ==
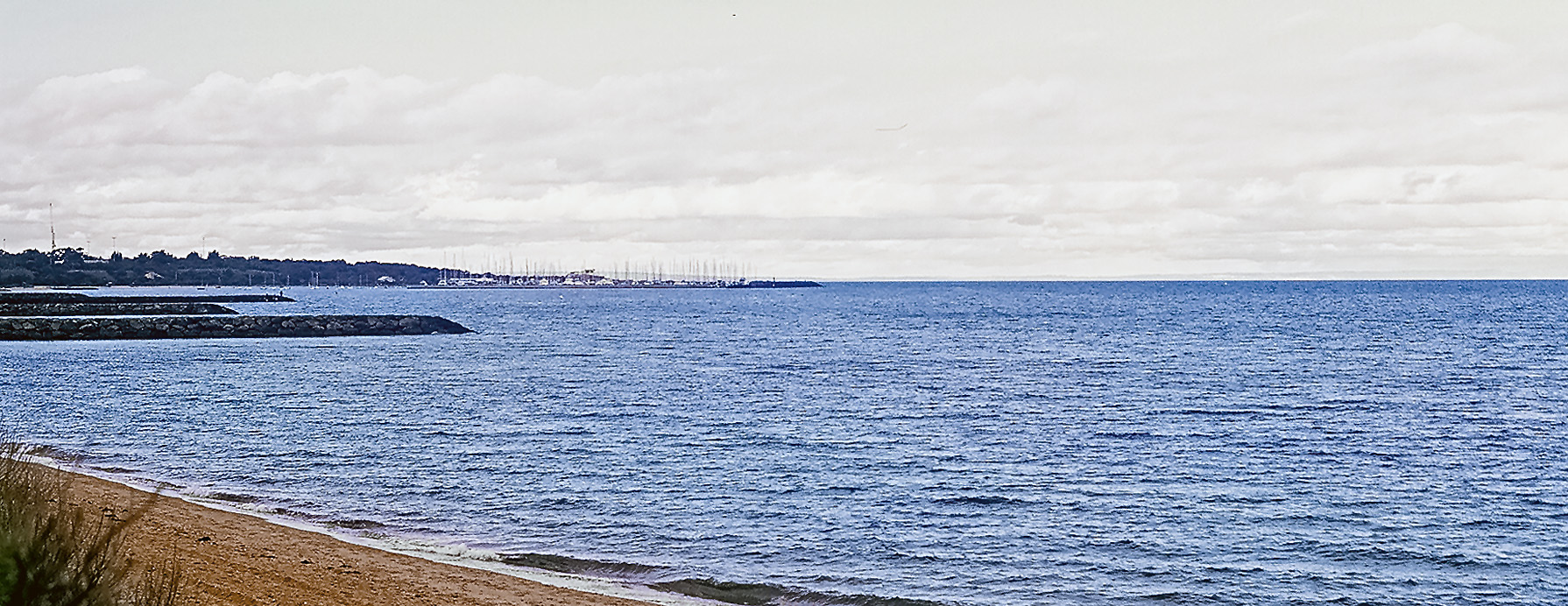
Brighton Beach in July 2024

In England, on 29 August 1840, Henry Dendy (1800–81) purchased 5,120 acres (2,070 ha) of Port Phillip land at £1 per acre, sight unseen, under the terms of the short-lived Special Survey regulations. Dendy arrived on 5 February 1841 to claim his land. The area was known as Dendy's Special Survey.

The area Dendy was compelled to take, called "Waterville", was bound by the coastline to the west and the present day North Road, East Boundary Road and South Road. A town was surveyed in mid-1841, defined by the crescent-shaped street layout which remains today, and subdivided allotments were offered for sale. The area soon became the "Brighton Estate", and Dendy's site for his own home was named "Brighton Park". Unfortunately, the land did not have any ready sources of water. Sales were slow at first, and the financial depression came and Dendy's scheme for emigration and land sales failed. The family of his agent Jonathan Binns Were (1809–85) who had arrived in Melbourne in 1839, bought the land. All of Dendy's business ventures failed, and he died a pauper.

After the depression, sales of land resulted in Brighton becoming the third most populated town in the Port Phillip District (after Melbourne and Portland), by 1846. Brighton attracted wealthy residents who wanted generous building sites and the prospect of sea bathing. By the late 1840s stately homes were built in an area known as 'The Terrace', now called the Esplanade, overlooking Dendy Street Beach. The Brighton Post Office opened on 19 April 1853.

St Andrew's Anglican Church, Brighton, one of the earliest churches in Victoria, was founded in 1842. Wesleyan and Catholic churches followed by 1848, and a Methodist church in 1851. Schools were opened on the Anglican Church land (1849) and by the Catholic Church in Centre Road (1850). Another was opened in the Wesleyan Church in 1855. In 1854, Brighton had a census population of 2,731.

A railway connection to Melbourne was built in stages: Windsor to North Brighton was completed in 1859 and connected to the loop line to St Kilda station; the connection to Melbourne was made in 1860; and the line was extended from North Brighton to Brighton Beach in 1861. A single line railway-tram from St Kilda to Brighton Beach was completed in 1906. The railway tramline was duplicated in 1914. In 1919 the railway was electrified. A tram ran down Hawthorn Road; the section from Glenhuntly to North Road was completed in 1925 and extended to Nepean Highway in 1937.

The noted bathing boxes in Brighton are known to have existed as far back as 1862, although the earliest ones were at the water's edge at the end of Bay St rather than their present location on Dendy Street Beach just south of Middle Brighton. In 1906, the completion of a tram line from St Kilda to Brighton led to an increase in applications for bathing box permits and significant construction between 1908 and 1911; final numbers are uncertain, but between 100 and 200 bathing box sites may have been allocated prior to the Great Depression. As part of capital works programs during the Depression to help relieve unemployment, the City of Brighton, backed by State Government funding, relocated all bathing boxes to the high-water mark on Dendy Street Beach, or removed them completely. The boxes were relocated again in 1934 to their present position at the rear of this beach.

Two years after the opening of the railway line to Brighton Beach in 1861, Captain Kenny's Brighton Beach Baths opened. At the time, bathing in the open during daylight hours was strictly prohibited, as was mixed bathing: separate sections of the beach were designated for men and for women. The baths were built off shore and were accessed by a wooden bridge, so that bathers would not have to cross the sand clad only in bathing costumes, but could gain entry straight into the water. Brighton Beach Baths had been destroyed several times, and were finally demolished in 1979. The Middle Brighton Municipal Baths were opened in 1881. The Baths are one of the only remaining caged open water sea baths in Australia.

On 18 January 1859, the municipality of Brighton was proclaimed extending eastwards between Dendy's survey boundaries to Thomas Street and Nepean Highway. Brighton became a borough in October 1863, and in 1870 parts of Elwood and Elsternwick were added. Brighton became a town on 18 March 1887. It annexed 13.8 hectares (34.1 acres) from the City of Moorabbin on 3 April 1912 and became the City of Brighton on 12 March 1919. On 14 December 1994, the City of Brighton was incorporated in a new municipality called City of Bayside.

The Brighton Magistrates' Court closed on 1 February 1985.

=== Heritage listings ===
Tait set at Brighton Beach railway station, 2024

Kamesburgh, 2024

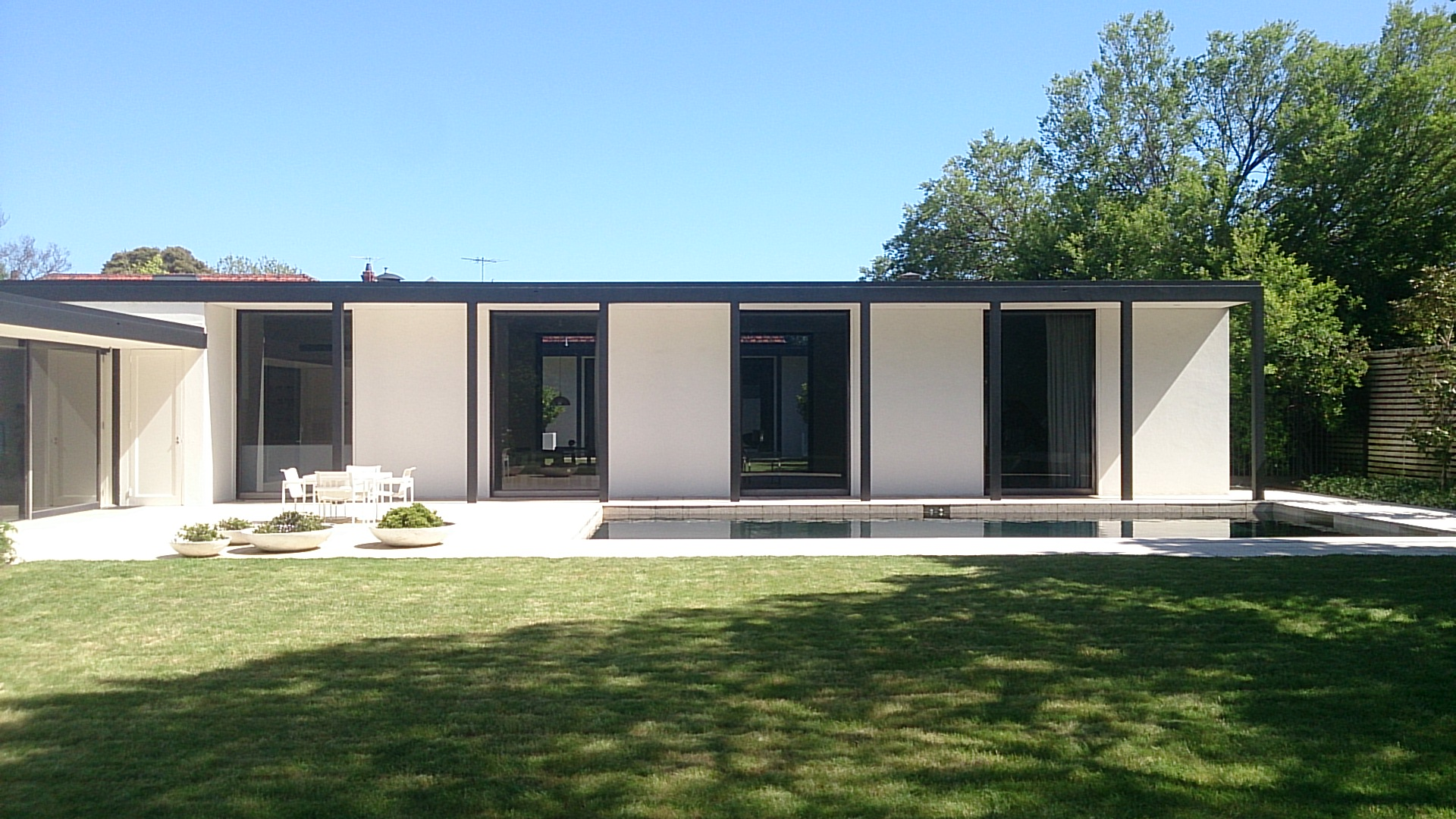
Seccull House, 2016

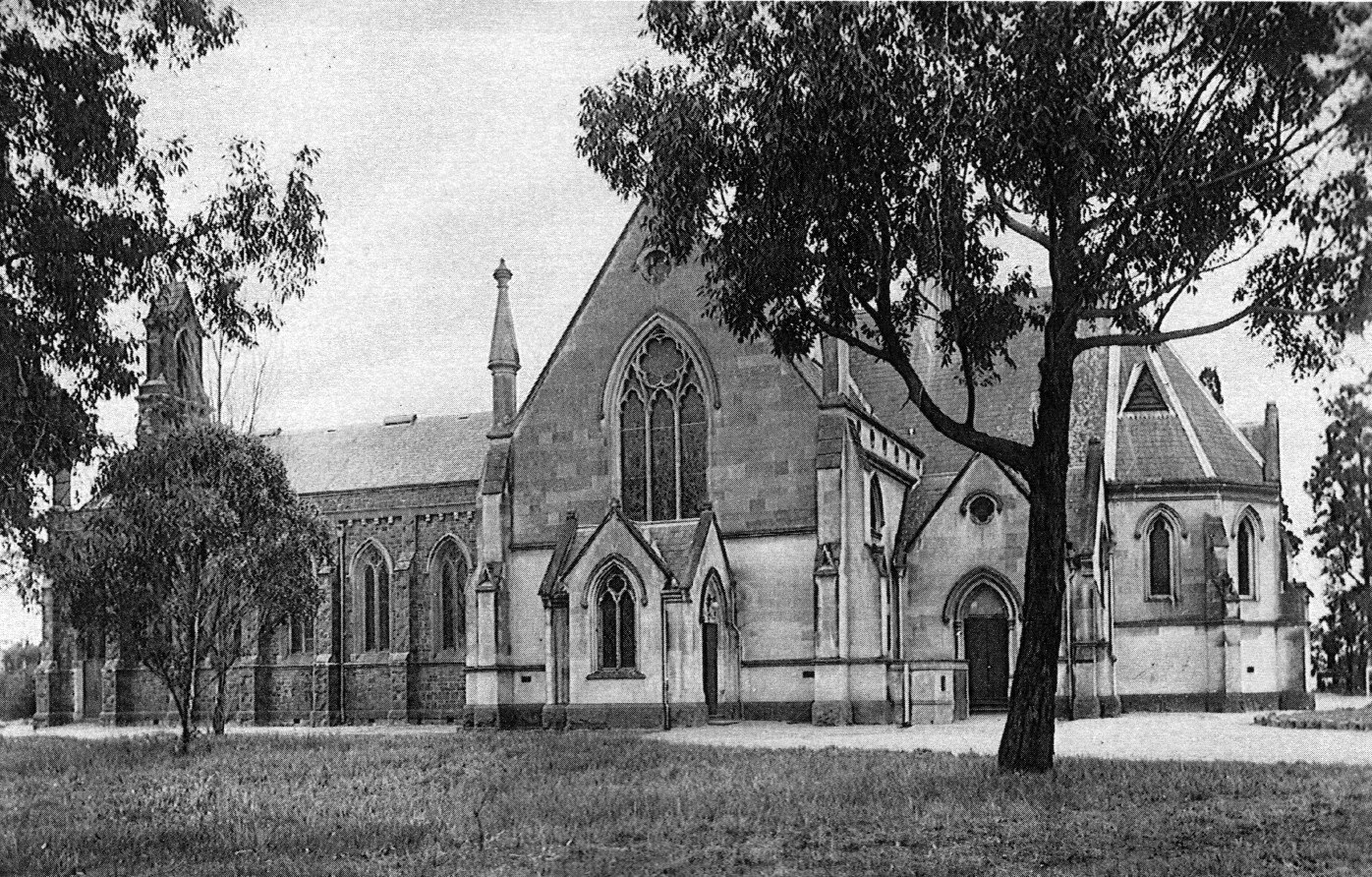
St Andrew's Church, 1887

The following places in Brighton are listed on the Victorian Heritage Register:

- Sir Thomas Bent statue, Nepean Hwy
- Billilla, 26 Halifax Street
- Brighton Bathing Boxes, The Esplanade
- Brighton Beach railway station, 1 The Esplanade
- Brighton Municipal Offices, 15 Boxshall Street
- Chevy Chase, 201 Were Street
- Congregational Church (former; now Trinity Uniting Church), 15–17 Black Street
- Kamesburgh, 74–104 North Road
- Kiora, 81 South Road
- Kuring-Gai, 257 St Kilda Street
- Middle Brighton railway station, Church Street
- New Street railway gates, New Street
- Old Melbourne Gaol Burial Markers, Off Beach Rd, from Brighton to Beaumaris
- The Pines, 10 Middle Crescent
- Seccull House, 23 North Road
- St Andrew's Church, 15 St Andrew's Street
- St James' Church and Presbytery, 73 North Road
- St Kilda Street Bridge, St Kilda Street, also awarded an Engineering Heritage Marker by Engineers Australia

== Former cinemas ==
=== Prince George Theatre ===
The Prince George Theatre was located in Church Street, Middle Brighton.

The building was originally built as the Caledonian Hall by David Munro in the late 19th century. It was first used as a public hall, doubling as a cinema when moving pictures were created in the first decade of the 20th Century. In 1920 the hall was refurbished, and reopened as the Grand Central Cinema. In October 1926 Robert McLeish Theatres of Swanston Street, Melbourne took over operations of the cinema, renaming it the Paramount.

Bert Ward (born c.1907), (Note: This cinema family dynasty comprised Robert Glanville "Bert" Ward XIII; Robert Ward XIV; and Robert Cameron Ward XV.) had been running and the Hoyts Southern in Hampton, having also learnt projectionist skills. When the run-down Paramount was put on sale at a low price in 1928, he bought the theatre at the age of 21. With assistance from his family he made improvements, including central heating and quality sound equipment.

In 1933, Ward renamed the cinema the Prince George Theatre (after the son of King George V and Queen Mary). A CinemaScope screen was installed in the 1950s, and with the introduction of television, the cinema, then under the management of Bert's son Robert Ward, was also used to broadcast television programmes onto the big screen. At that time, the Ward family owned several cinemas, including the Burnley in Burnley; the Civic in Ashburton; the Mayfair in Gardenvale; the Prince George; and the Dendy Theatre. They also had interests in the Savoy in Russell Street, Melbourne.

With the coming of television, Ward introduced a policy of showing arthouse films, probably the first such cinema to do so in Melbourne. However, with the Dendy Cinema increasingly difficult to maintain afloat financially, Robert Ward closed the Prince George, and instead turned the Dendy into an arthouse cinema.

The building reopened as the Basin Street Jazz Centre, which closed in 1962. It then underwent various other changes and became derelict.

=== Dendy Theatre ===
The Dendy Theatre in Church Street, Middle Brighton, was built in 1940 and named after Henry Dendy, to designs in Art Deco style by Cowper Murphy Appleford. It was built on a site where Dendy made his first camp. It was built as a single-screen cinema with 1,172 seats, each with individual foot-warmers, and opened on 29 November 1940. It also included a crying room for mothers with young children. It was later known as the Dendy Cinema.

The cinema was owned by Bert Ward (born c.1907), who passed his cinema industry knowledge and skills onto his son Robert Ward OAM (died 2017). Under Robert, the Dendy cinema brand spread first into the city in Collins Street, then across the suburbs and interstate. Dendy Theatre was known as Dendy Cinema in the 1960s. Film screenings were regularly advertised in The Australian Jewish News, which reported in 1966 that "generous concessions" were available to Jewish organisations for group bookings.

In March 1966 the cinema underwent a major renovation and upgrade of its equipment, costing A$45,000. It was fitted with 70 mm and Todd-AO widescreen equipment, with Otto Preminger's In Harm's Way the first film scheduled to be shown using the new equipment the following month. In April 1967, a three-manual, fifteen-rank Wurlitzer organ was installed in the theatre, after being transported from the Capitol Theatre in Swanston Street, Melbourne. The organ was officially opened by organist Horace Webber, who had first opened the instrument in 1924. It was played almost every night for around 15 years, and was featured on television. In December 1983 organ was removed ahead of demolition of the theatre in January 1984.

In March 1969, American group The Platters, who were touring Australia, played live at the cinema over two weeks, along with screenings of the film Becket (1964 film), starring Peter O'Toole and Richard Burton.

In 1979 Andrew Ward applied to replace the Dendy Cinema with a two-screen cinema complex, along with shops and offices. Redevelopment of the site began four years later and the new Dendy Centre opened on 30 April 1985. The cinema was called the Brighton Village Twin (also referred to as the Dendy Twin), with the organ eventually reinstalled in Cinema One in 1988.

The cinema closed for renovations in 2000, reopening as a multi-screen cinema in the same year. Screen 4 contained the organ. By 2009 it had expanded to include five cinemas, operated by Palace Cinemas as an arthouse cinema. In 2021 Palace Cinemas announced that the auditorium housing the organ would be converted into four screens, and that the organ would be reinstalled at The Capitol.

== Today ==
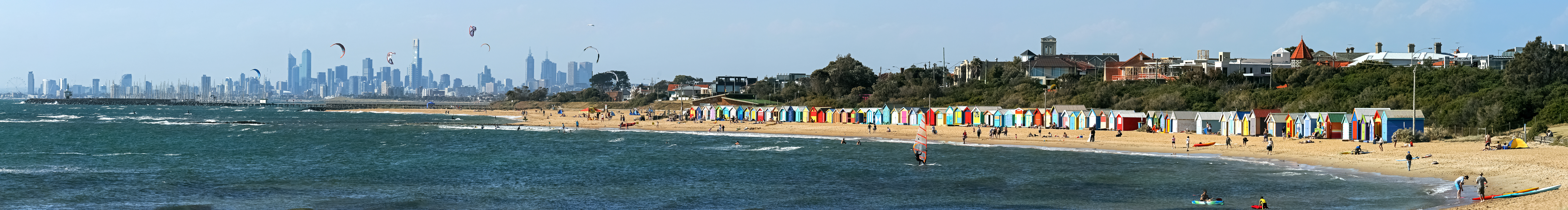
Bathing boxes on Dendy Street Beach with Middle Brighton pier and breakwater and the city skyline in the background

On the beach, Beach Road is a popular cycling route, with the Bay Trail off-road walking/cycling tracks also following the coastline.

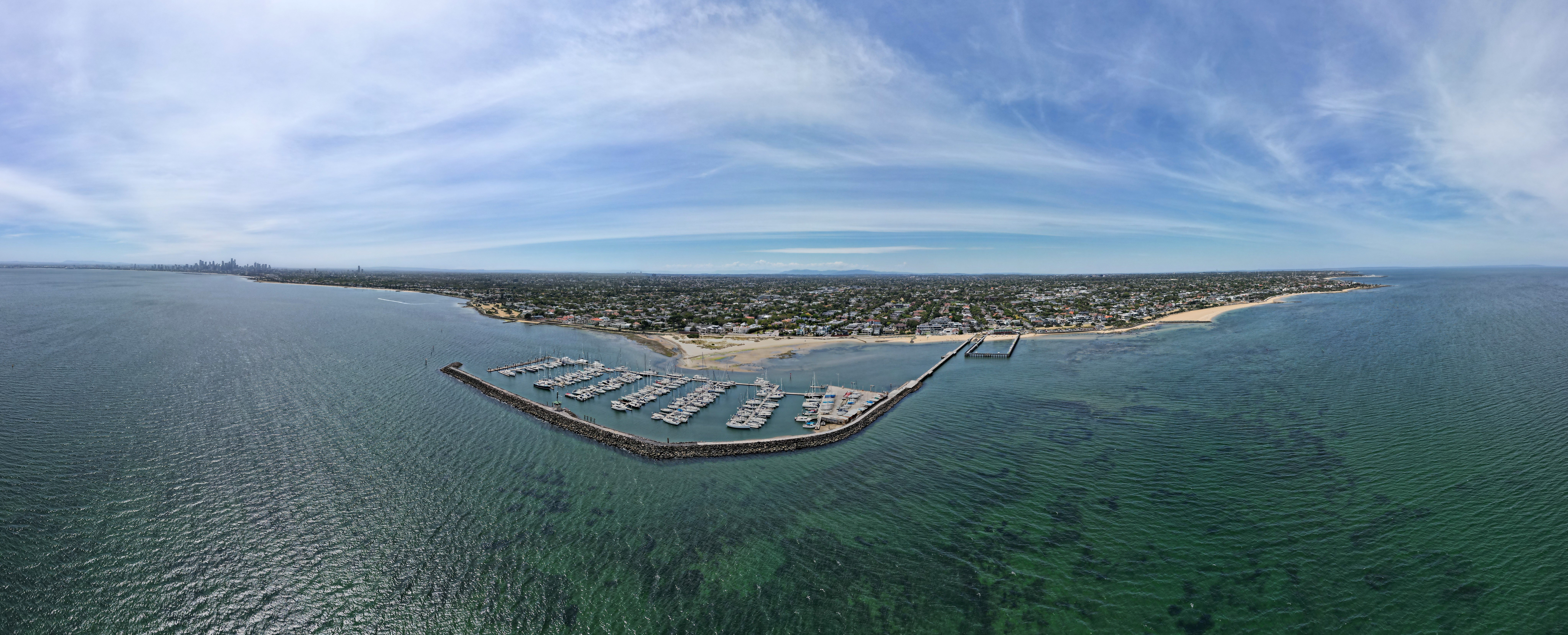
Aerial panorama of Middle Brighton pier and its surrounds (Feb. 2023)

Dendy Street Beach, just south of Middle Brighton, features 82 colorful bathing boxes, which are one of the tourist icons of Melbourne. The boxes share a uniformity of size and build, and a regular arrangement along the beach, and are the only surviving such structures close to the Melbourne CBD. A Planning Scheme Heritage Overlay on the boxes by the Bayside City Council restricts alterations, and all retain their Victorian era architecture, such as timber frames, weatherboard sidings, and corrugated iron roofs, without amenities such electricity or running water. The bathing boxes may only be purchased by residents paying local council rates, and as of 2020 were selling for prices in the range of A$300,000 - 400,000 with annual council rates of around A$500, despite their lack of amenities. In 2009 plans were announced to build at least six new bathing boxes in an effort by the council to raise funds in excess of A$1 million during the 2008 financial crisis.

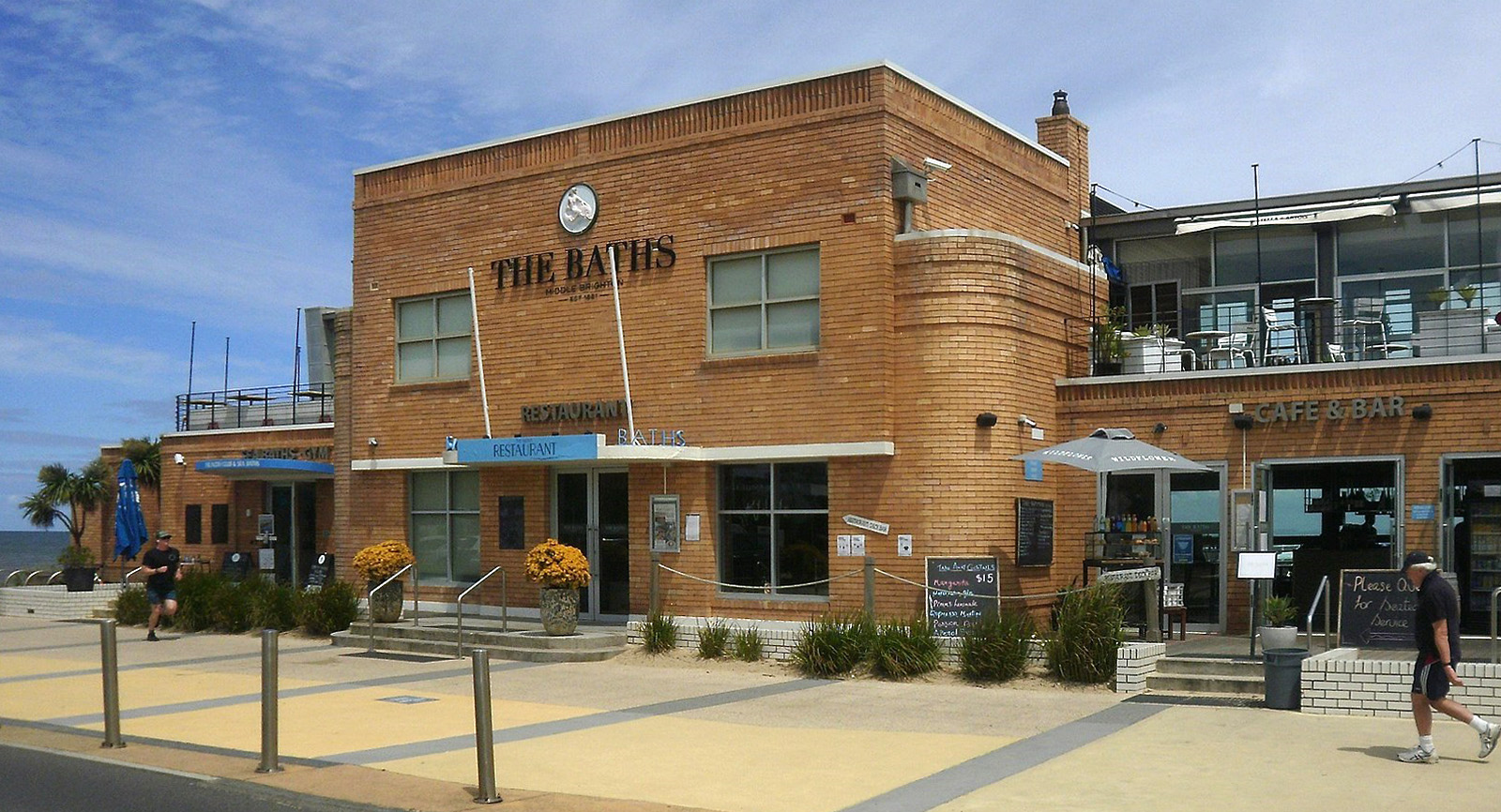
The Baths - including sea baths, gym, and restaurant

Between Middle Brighton Beach and Sandown St Beach are the historic moderne Middle Brighton Municipal Baths, Royal Brighton Yacht Club, and the Middle Brighton Pier and breakwater. North Road in Brighton features many old churches and residences. The North Road Pavilion is a café which has an outlook of Port Phillip Bay, while the beachfront features views of the Melbourne city skyline.

There are two cinemas in Brighton, both owned by Palace Cinemas; one in Middle Brighton (on the site of the former Dendy Theatre), and the Palace Brighton cinema located at Bay Street, North Brighton.

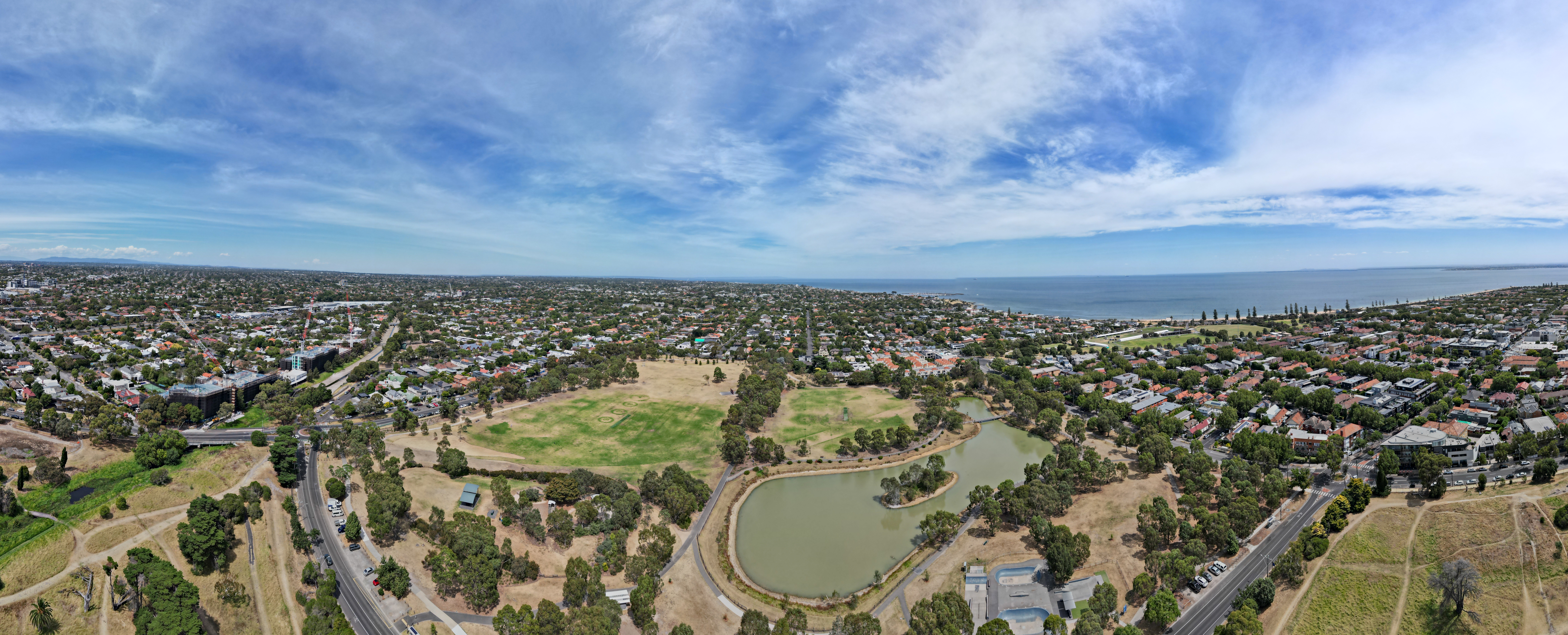
Aerial panorama of Elsternwick Park and Port Phillip Bay, 2023

The former Brighton Municipal Offices, now the Brighton library and council chamber, were designed by K. F. Knight in 1959-60 are a red brick miniature of Frank Lloyd Wright's Guggenheim Museum in New York City. The interior furnishings were created by industrial designer Grant Featherston.

== Population ==
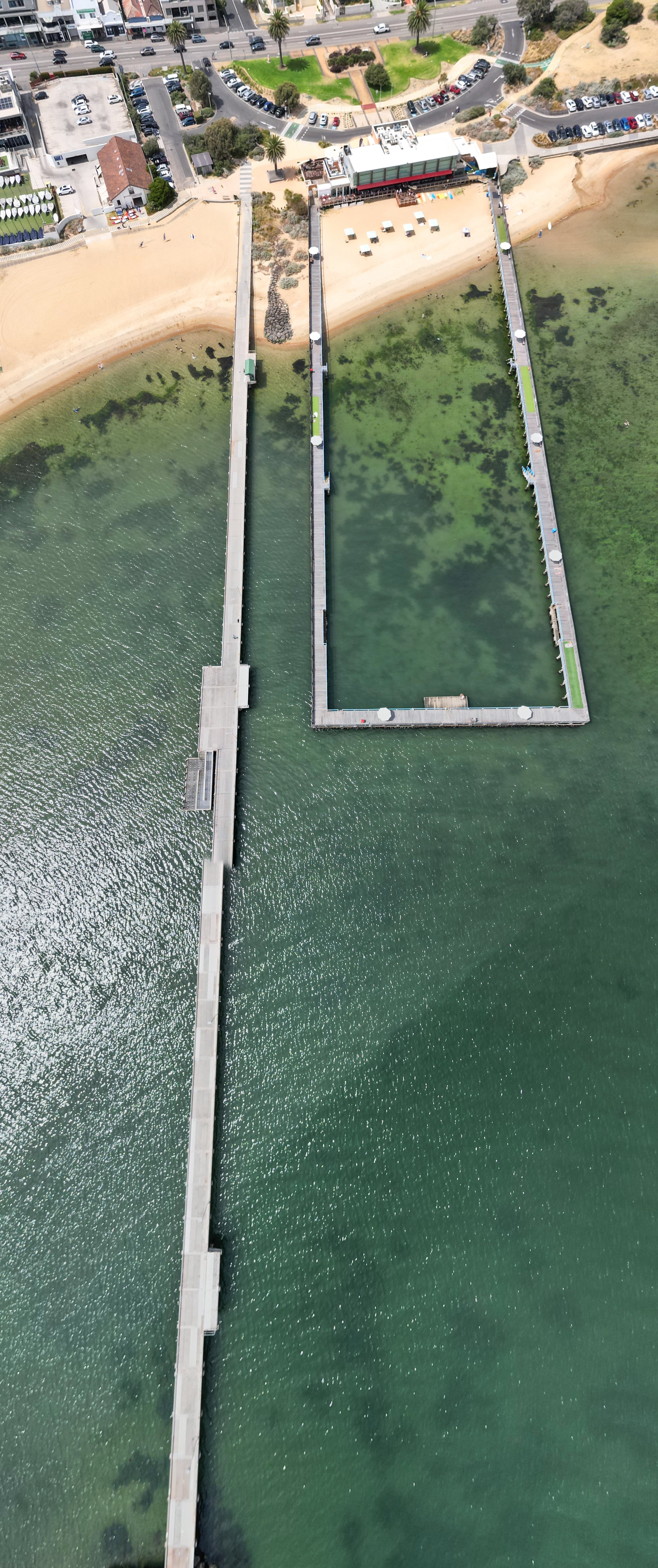
Vertical aerial panorama of Middle Brighton Pier.and the Brighton Baths from above, 2023

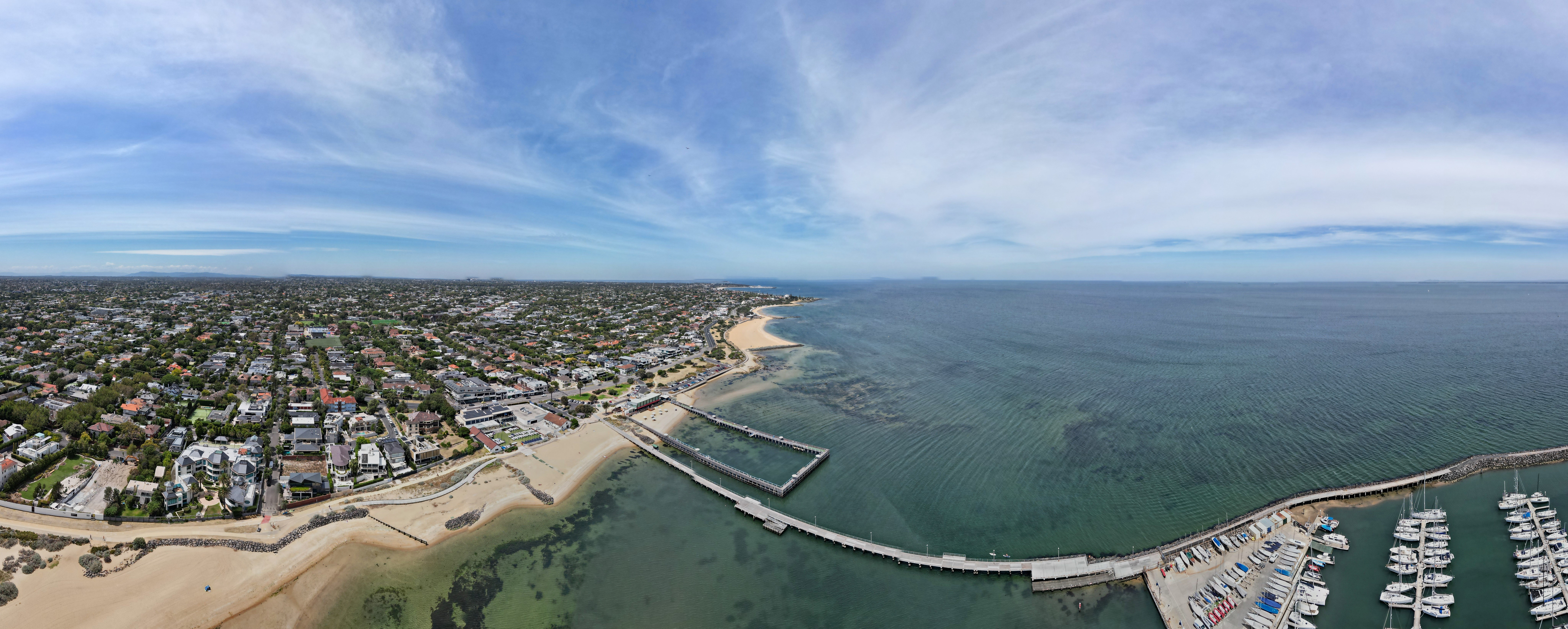
Aerial panorama of Middle Brighton Pier and its fleet of yachts, 2023

In the 2016 Census, there were 23,253 people in Brighton. 68.1% of people were born in Australia. The next most common countries of birth were England 5.4%, China 2.8%, New Zealand 1.7%, United States of America 1.2% and South Africa 1.1%. 79.0% of people spoke only English at home. Other languages spoken at home included Mandarin 3.2%, Greek 1.9%, Italian 1.5%, Russian 1.4% and French 0.8%. The most common responses for religion in Brighton were Christianity 55.9%, No Religion 33.6%, Catholic 22.5% (subsector of Christianity) and Anglican 16.7% (subsector of Christianity.

== Transport ==
Brighton is serviced by the Gardenvale, North Brighton, Middle Brighton, and Brighton Beach railway stations on the Sandringham line.

There is an extensive network of bus routes in the area. Major routes include 600/922/923, forming a related corridor between St Kilda and Southland Shopping Centre north-south through the suburb; 603 north to Burnley; and routes 630 and 703 running east towards Monash University (Clayton) (and Blackburn for 703). Parts of routes 606, 626, 811/812, and 823 also run through the suburb.

Major arterial roads, such as South Road and North Road, run near or through Brighton.

The Bay Trail off-road bicycle path passes through the Brighton foreshore.

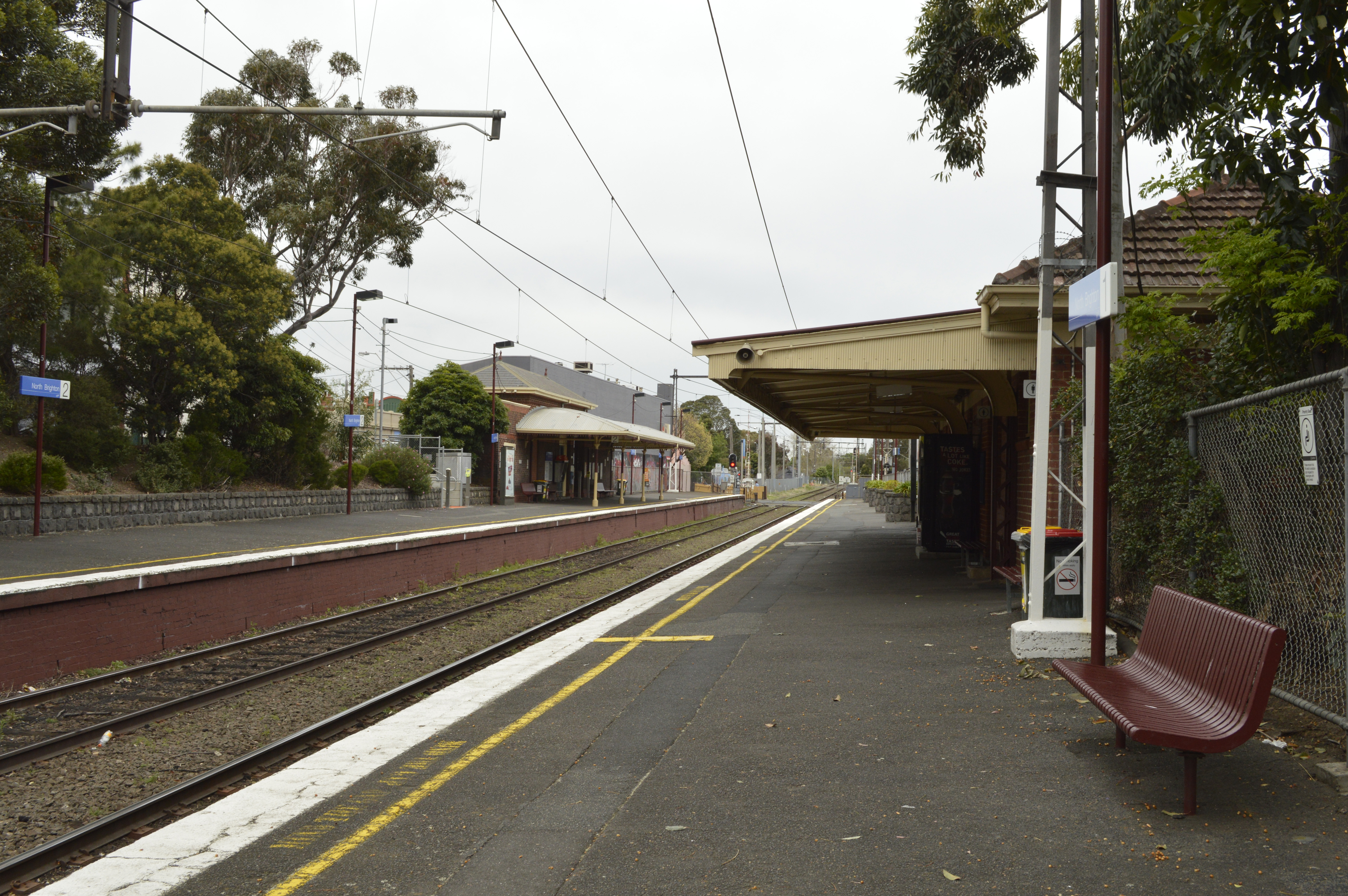
North Brighton station

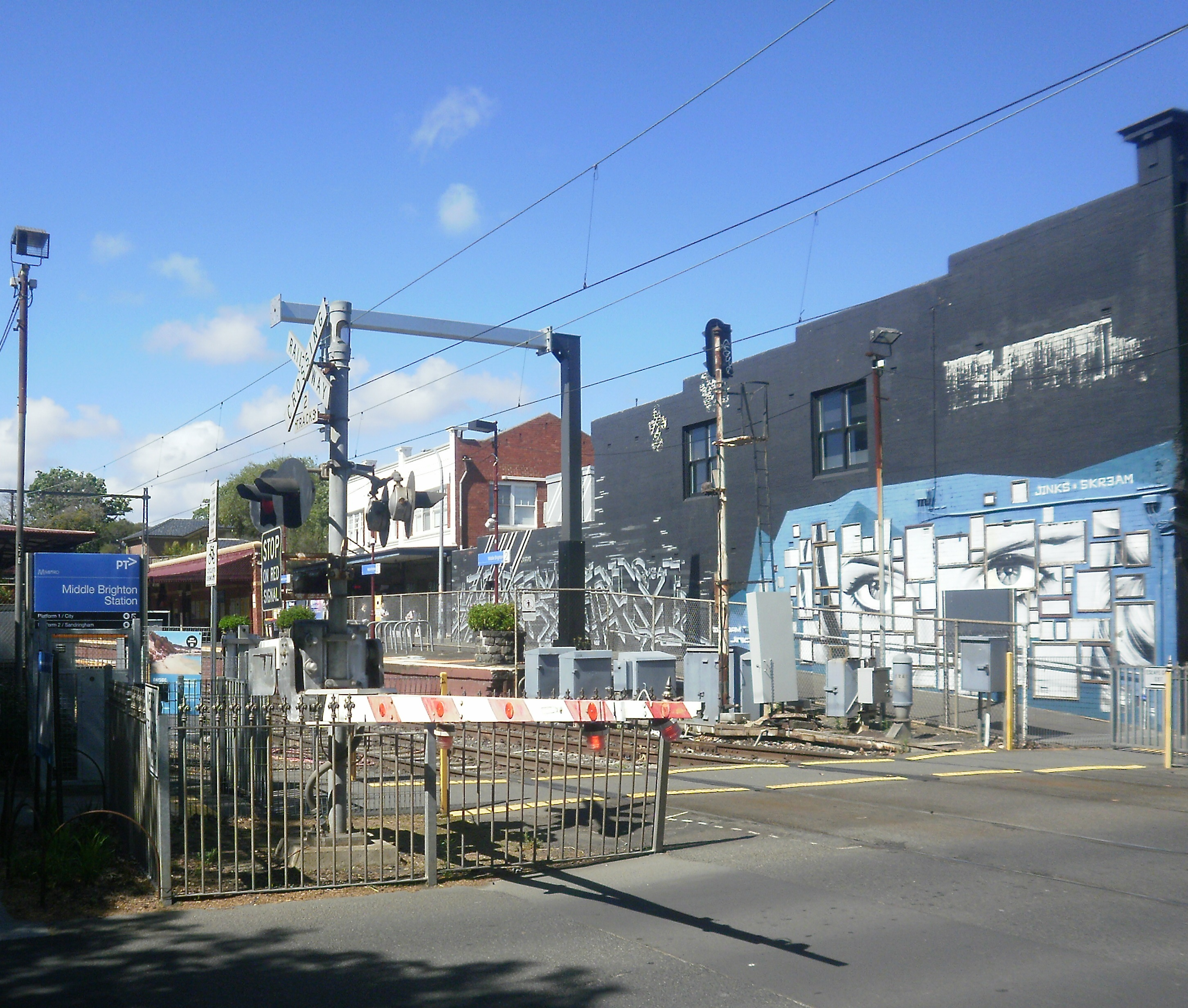
Middle Brighton station

== Education ==
Secondary schools within Brighton includes Brighton Grammar School, Brighton Secondary College, Firbank Girls' Grammar School, Haileybury's Castlefield campus, St Leonard's College, Xavier College's Kostka Hall junior campus (closed down in 2021), and Star of the Sea College.

The Melbourne International School of Japanese, a part-time Japanese school, previously held its classes at the Brighton Grammar School in Brighton. The local Catholic Primary schools are St Joan of Arc's Brighton and St James Primary School which is near Star of the Sea.

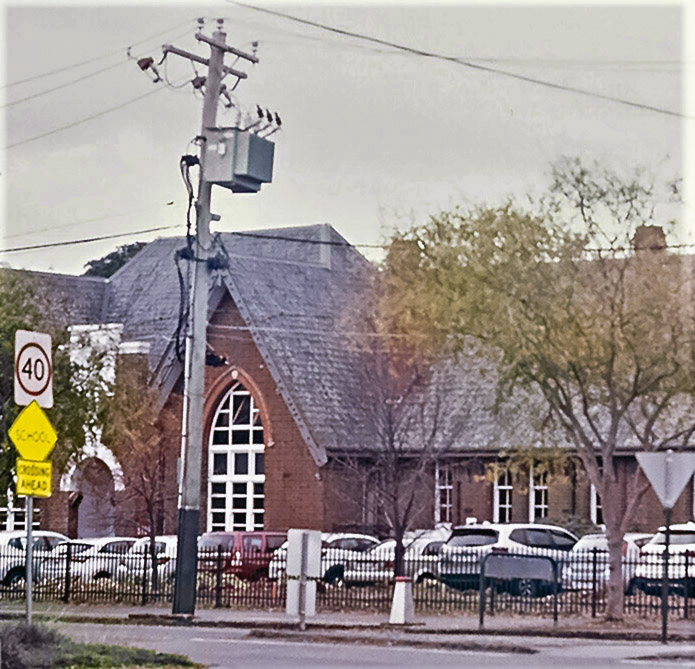
Brighton Primary School

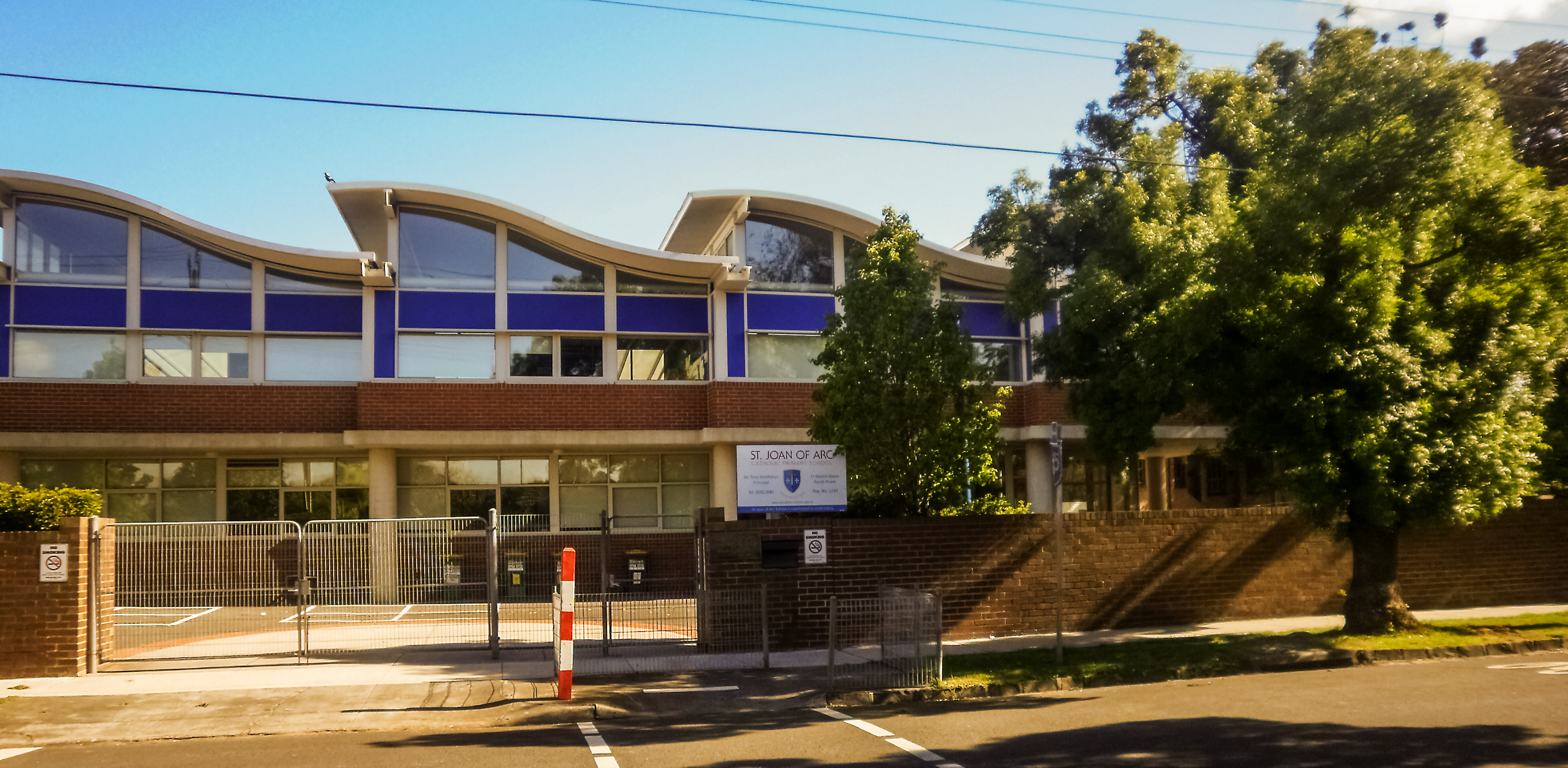
St Joan of Arc's Primary School

== Sport ==
Golfers play at the Brighton Public Golf Course on Dendy Street.

Brighton is home to the Brighton Icebergers.

Brighton Beach is one of Port Phillip Bay's premier kite surfing locations with designated access lanes for kitesurfing and regular lessons being held opposite the beachfront hotel; The Brighton Savoy.

Bridge is taught and played the Dendy Park bridge club.

Brighton is also home to the following sports clubs:

- Bayside Cougars Hockey Club
- Brighton Soccer Club
- Brighton Cricket Club
- Cluden Cricket Club
- East Brighton United Soccer Club
- Old Brighton Grammarians Amateur Football Club (Australian Rules)

== Notable residents ==
Some notable residents, past and present, include:

- Shaniera Akram
- Wasim Akram, former cricketer and Pakistan captain
- Alfred William Anderson, butcher and entrepreneur
- Eric Bana, actor
- Marcus Bastiaan, businessman and Liberal Party power broker
- James Brayshaw, former cricketer, media personality, and The AFL Footy Show host
- Philippa Christian, author, celebrity nanny & TV personality
- Alastair Clarkson, sportsman
- Leslie Cochrane, politician
- Timothy Conigrave, actor, writer and activist
- Shane Crawford, former Australian rules football player, television media personality, and author
- Brendan Fevola, former Australian rules footballer
- Danny Frawley, former Australian rules footballer and media personality
- Cathy Freeman, former athlete
- Adam Lindsay Gordon, poet
- Thomas Francis Hyland, pioneering wine industry businessman, associated with Penfolds
- Jack Iverson, cricketer who lived and sold real estate in the area
- Justus Jorgensen, artist
- Chris Judd, Australian rules footballer
- Chris Lilley, comedian and actor
- Matthew Lloyd, former [ustralian rules footballer
- John Mather (artist), lived at The Pines, Wellington Street Brighton from 1895 to 1900
- Livinia Nixon, TV presenter
- Jesper Olsen, former Manchester United F.C. and Danish football (soccer) player
- Oscar Piastri, Formula 1 driver
- Ricky Ponting, former cricketer and Australian captain
- Jack Riewoldt, Australian rules footballer
- Nick Riewoldt, Australian rules footballer and media personality
- Jock Serong, author
- Frederick Taylor, squatter/property manager and mass murderer
- Shane Warne, former cricketer
- Jonathan Binns Were, stockbroker and politician
- Chester Wilmot, journalist and broadcaster
- Todd Woodbridge, tennis player

== Gallery ==
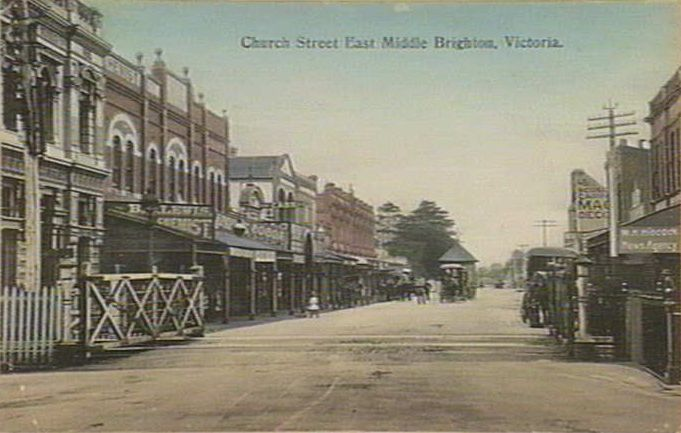
Church Street, Middle Brighton, 1907

Postcard of Brighton Beach, 1910

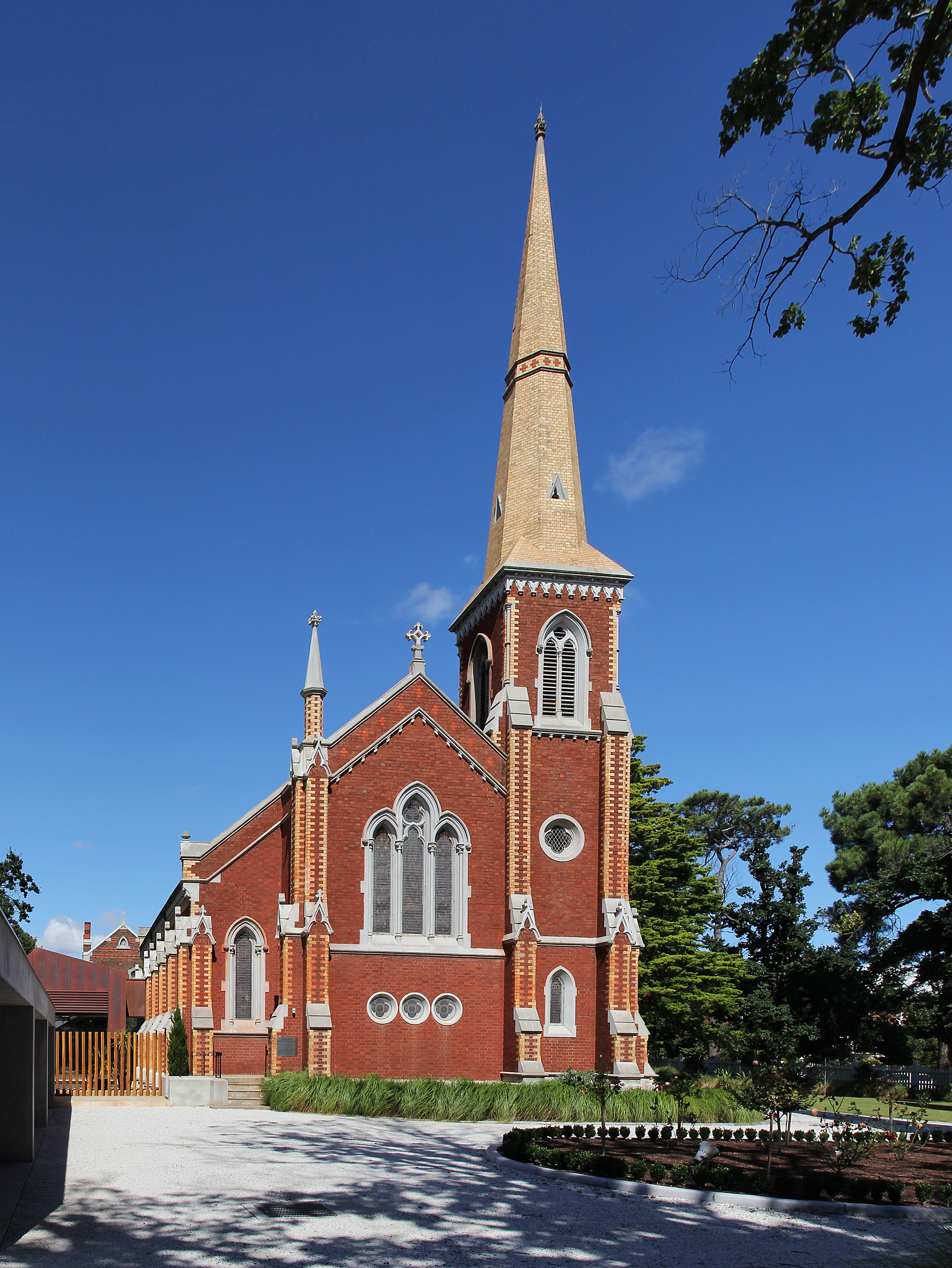
John Knox church, built 1876

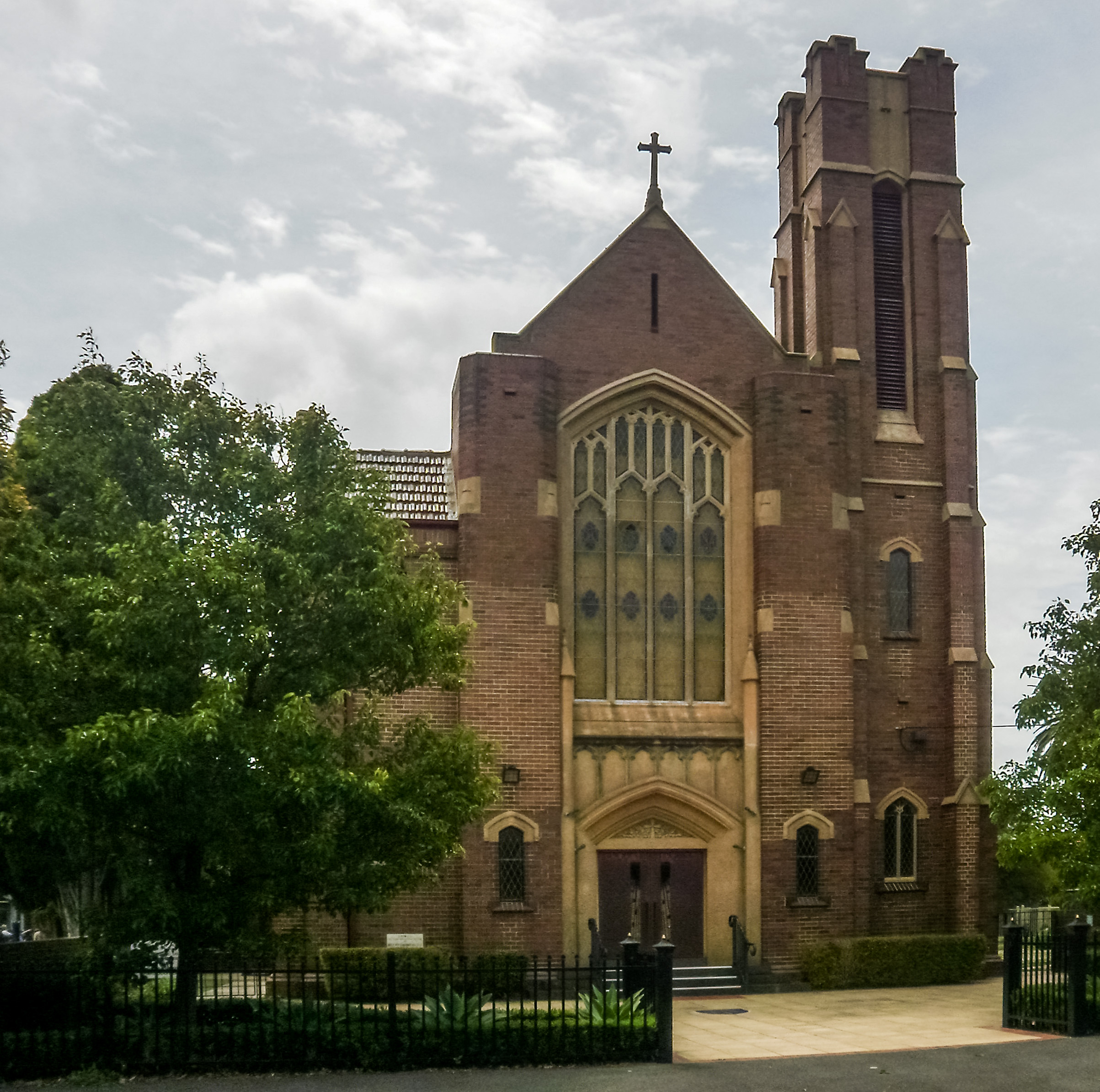
St Joan of Arc church in Brighton, 2021

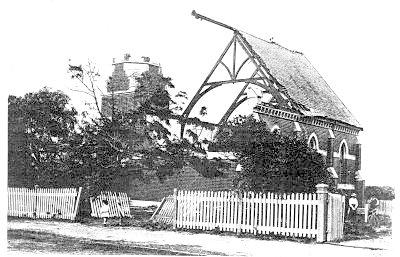
Aftermath of the Brighton tornado of 2 February 1918

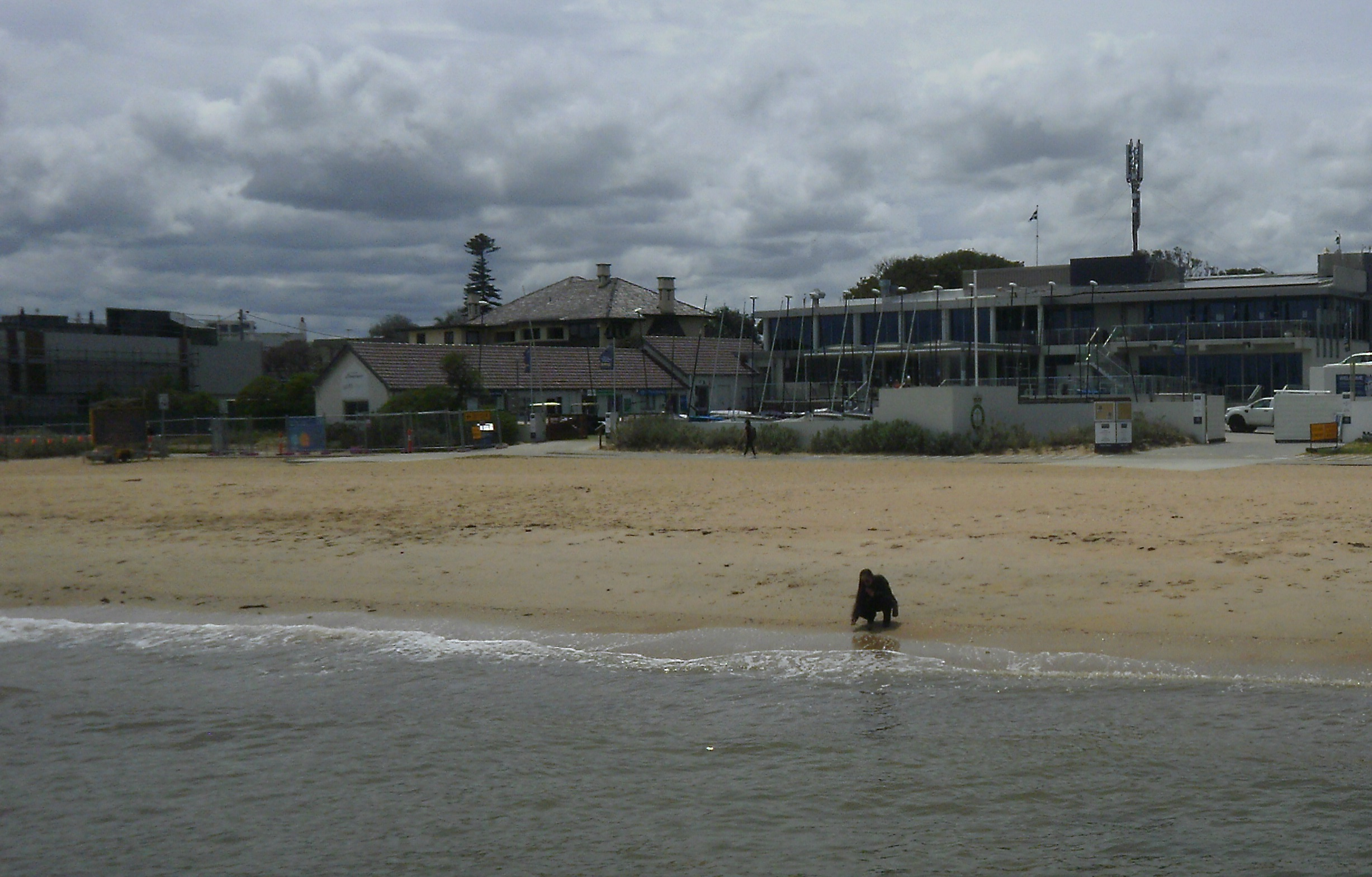
Royal Brighton Yacht Club, 2011

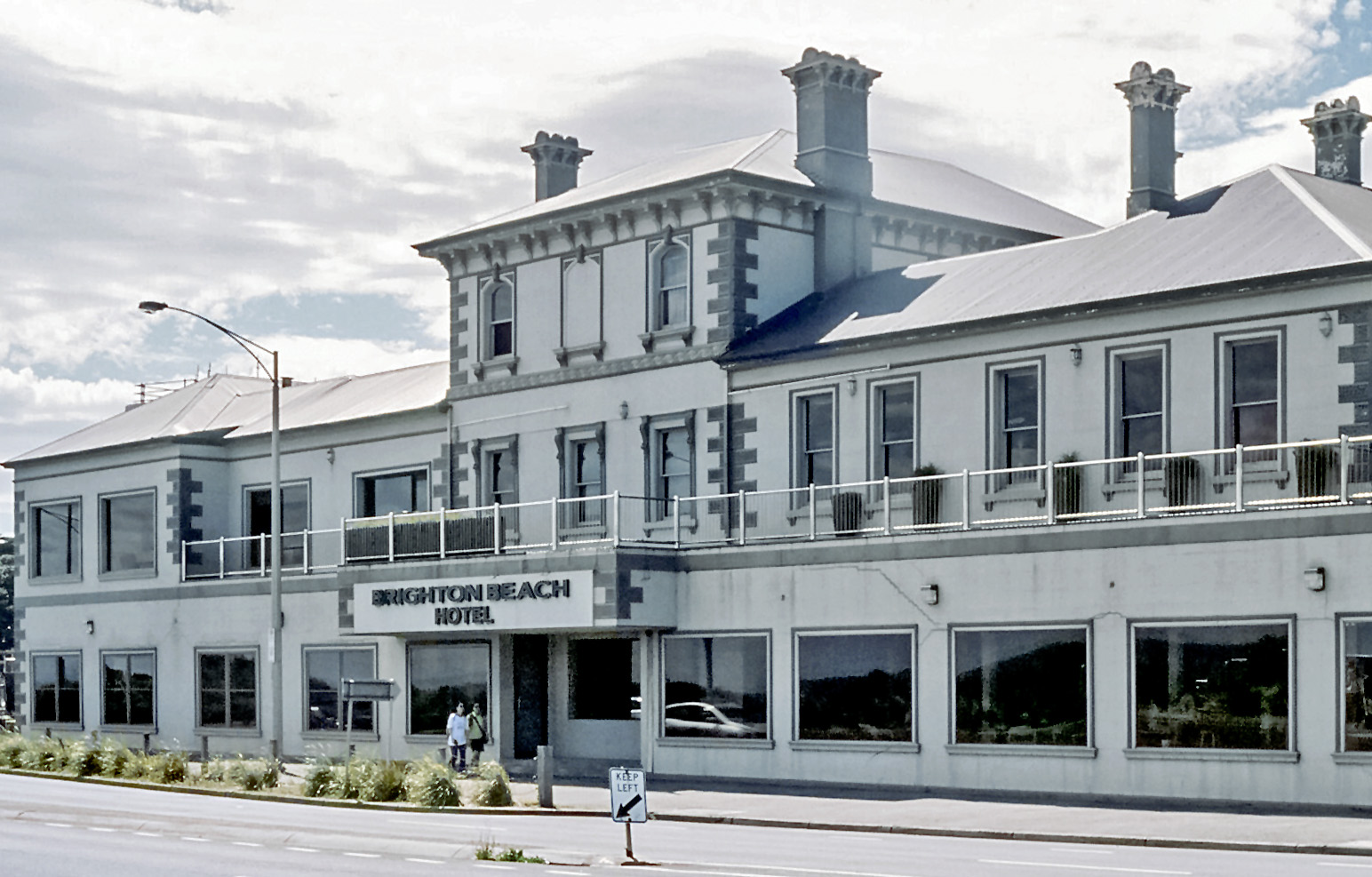
Brighton Beach Hotel

== See also ==
- City of Brighton – Brighton was previously within this former local government area.
- Ebrington (Brighton)
- Warrowen massacre
