= Brighton East =

East Brighton
- Suburb
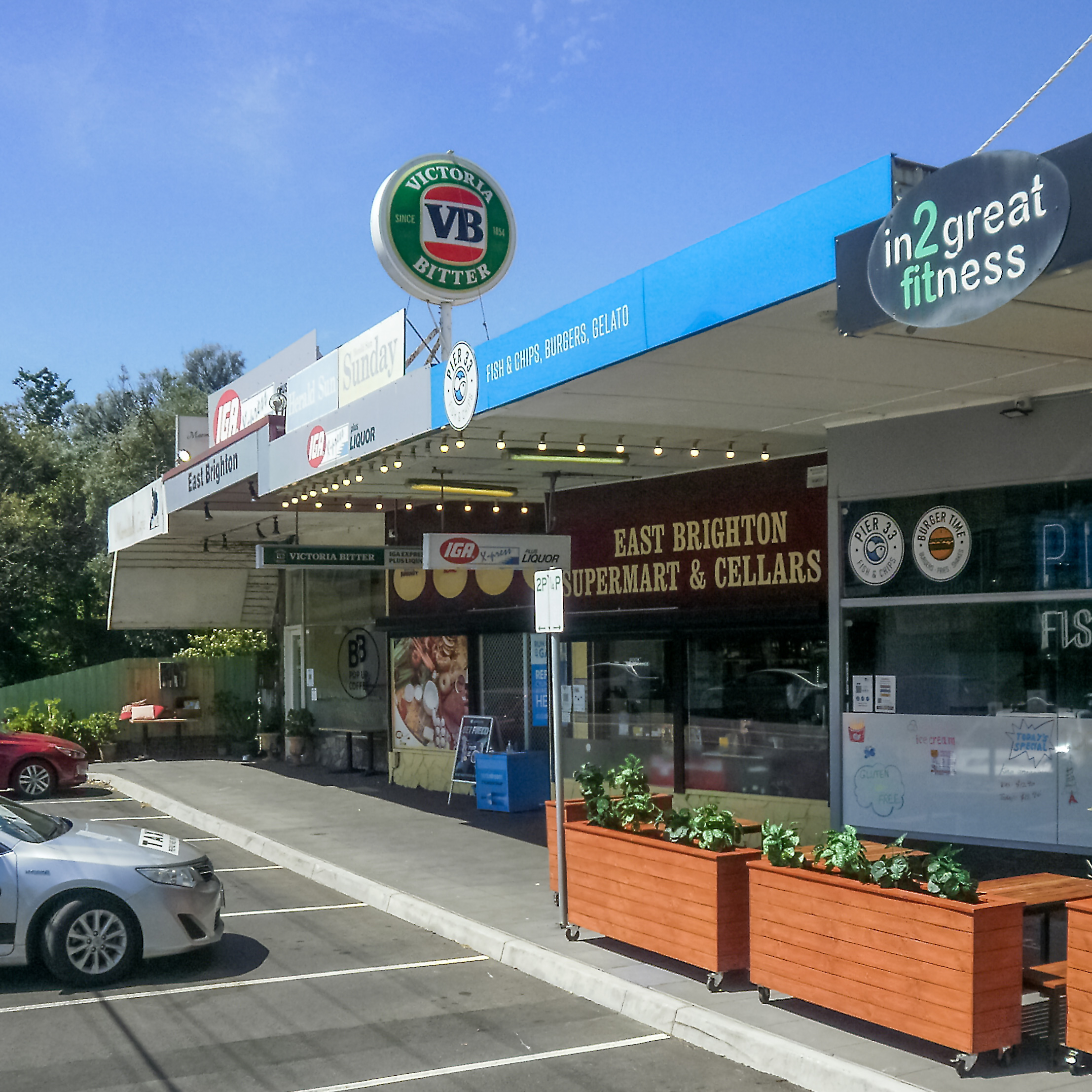
- Shops in Brighton East in 2021

- Interactive map of East Brighton
- Coordinates: 37.916°S 145.015°E
- Country: Australia
- State: Victoria
- City: Melbourne
- LGAs: City of Bayside; City of Glen Eira
- Location: 12 km (7.5 mi) from Melbourne

Government
  - State electorates: Bentleigh; Brighton
  - Federal division: Goldstein

Area
  - Total: 5.6 km^{2} (2.2 sq mi)
- Elevation: 23 m (75 ft)

Population
  - Total: 16,757 (2021 census)
  - Density: 2,992/km^{2} (7,750/sq mi)
- Postcode: 3187
Suburbs around East Brighton
Gardenvale	Caulfield South	Ormond
Brighton	East Brighton	McKinnon
Hampton	Hampton East	Bentleigh

Brighton East is a suburb in Melbourne, Victoria, Australia, 12 km south-east of Melbourne's Central Business District, located within the Cities of Bayside and Glen Eira local government areas. Brighton East recorded a population of 16,757 at the 2021 census.

Brighton East lies further inland from the coast of Port Philip Bay than Brighton, its affluent, neighbouring community to the west. Its boundaries are Nepean Highway in the northwest, North Road in the north, Thomas Street in the east, Nepean Highway in the southeast, South Road in the south, and Hampton Street in the west. Whilst most of Brighton East is located within the City of Bayside, a number of properties on Thomas Street are located within the City of Glen Eira.

Brighton East is known for its spacious parklands, most notably Dendy Park, one of Victoria's 10 biggest parks and outdoor recreation areas, Hurlingham Park, and Landcox Park.

== History ==
A massacre of at least 60 Bunurong people took place on the site of present-day Hurlingham Park and Landcox Park in the early 1830s, at a place known as Warrowen (various spellings, meaning "place of sorrow" or "incessant weeping"). It was "well known to early settlers, is mentioned in histories of Brighton, and pioneers' accounts – it was commonplace information in early Melbourne history".

=== Heritage listing ===
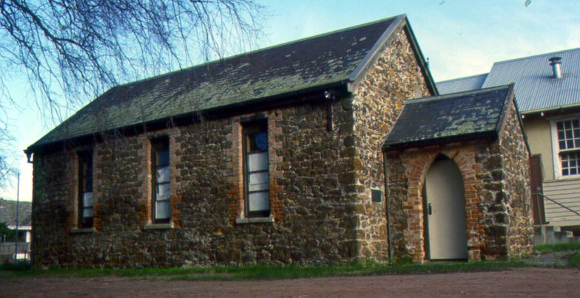
The former Anglican church and schoolroom, in 2012

The following place in Brighton East is listed on the Victorian Heritage Register:

- St John's the Less Anglican Church and schoolroom (former), 709 Hawthorne Road, built in 1840

== Educational institutions ==
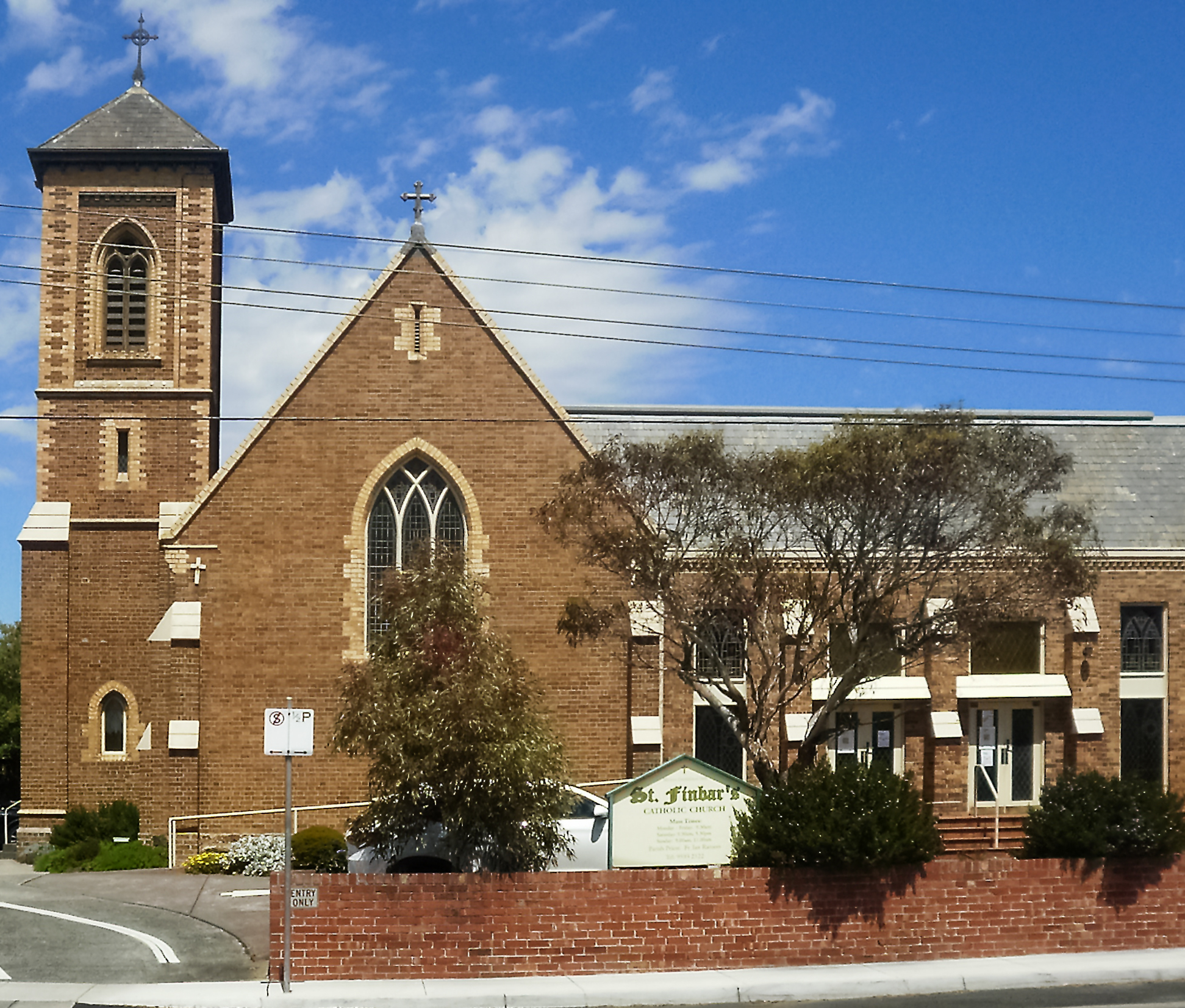
St Finbar's Catholic church

Public schools located in Brighton East include Gardenvale Primary School and Brighton Secondary College. Independent schools located in the suburb include Haileybury College, St. Finbar's Catholic primary school, and St Leonard's College.

Near Brighton East is Bentleigh West Primary School.

== Sport ==
East Brighton Football Club (senior Football Federation Victoria club known locally as "The Vampires"), Brighton Soccer Club (the largest Soccer Club in Victoria), Brighton District Cricket Club and Dendy Park Tennis Club are based at Dendy Park. East Brighton Junior Vampires Football Club, competing in the Moorabbin Saints Football League and Brighton Union Cricket Club, competing in the South East Cricket Association, are based at Hurlingham Park. Brighton Bowls Club is situated on the northeastern boundary of Dendy Park.

== Notable residents ==
- Oscar Piastri, a McLaren Formula 1 driver, born and raised in Brighton East

== See also ==
- City of Brighton – Brighton East was previously within this former local government area.
