= City of Bayside =

- Local government area
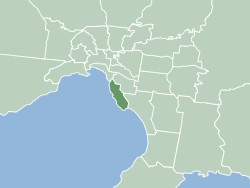
- Map of Melbourne showing City of Bayside

- Interactive map of City of Bayside
- Coordinates: 37°56′00″S 145°01′00″E
- Country: Australia
- State: Victoria
- Region: Greater Melbourne
- Established: 1994
- Council seat: Sandringham

Government
  - Mayor: Cr Hanna El Mouallem
  - State electorates: Brighton; Sandringham
  - Federal division: Goldstein

Area
  - Total: 37 km^{2} (14 sq mi)

Population
  - Total: 105,718 (2018)
  - Density: 2,860/km^{2} (7,400/sq mi)
- Website: City of Bayside
LGAs around City of Bayside
| Port Phillip | Port Phillip | Glen Eira |
| | City of Bayside | Glen Eira |
| Port Phillip | | Kingston |

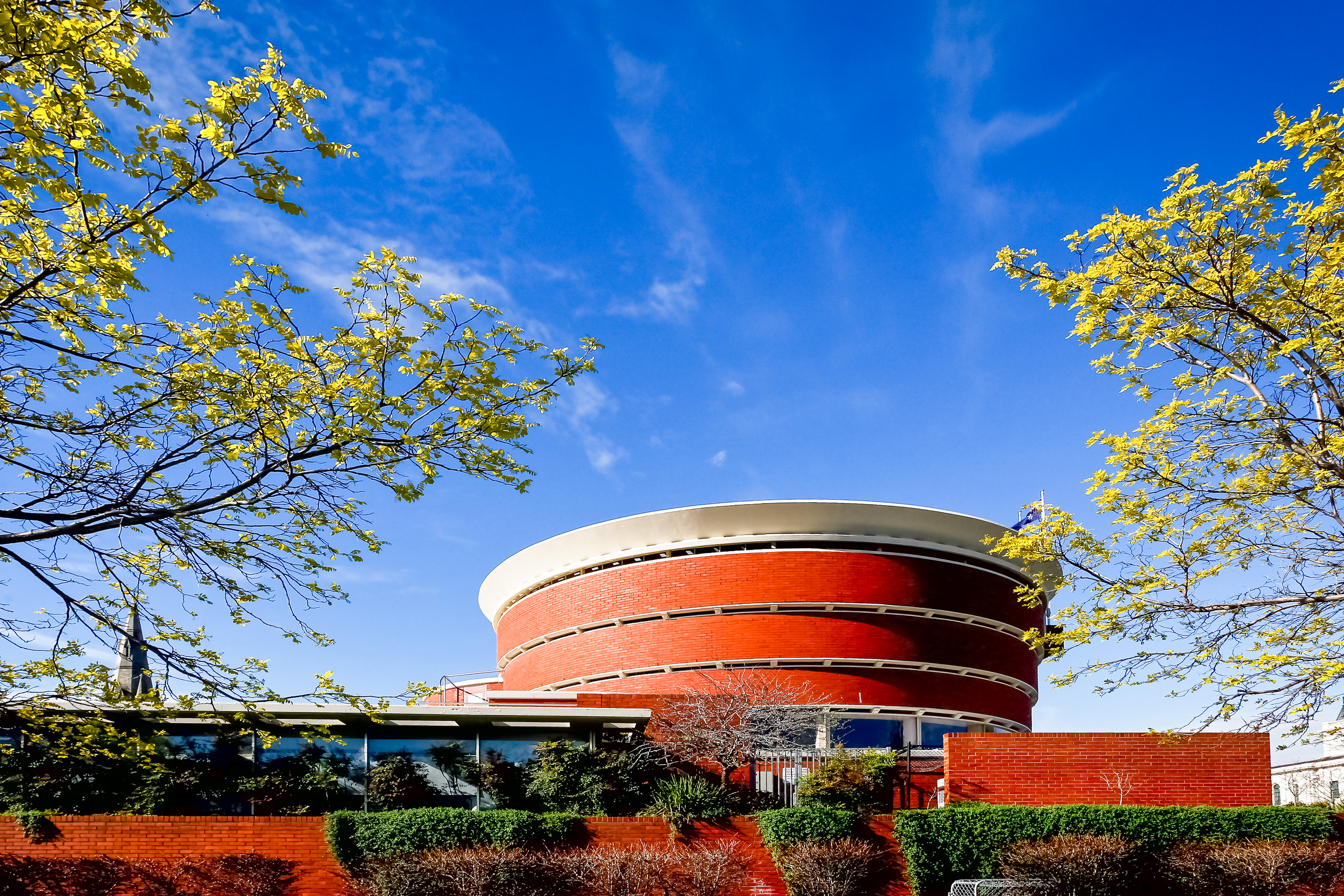
Council Chambers, Boxshall Street Brighton

The City of Bayside is a local government area in Victoria, Australia. It is within the southern suburbs of Melbourne. It has an area of 36 square kilometres and in 2018 had a population of 105,718 people.

== History ==
=== City of Brighton ===
In 1858, after receiving two petitions, the Government proclaimed the Municipality of Brighton. Brighton was proclaimed a borough in 1863, a town in 1887, and a city in 1919.

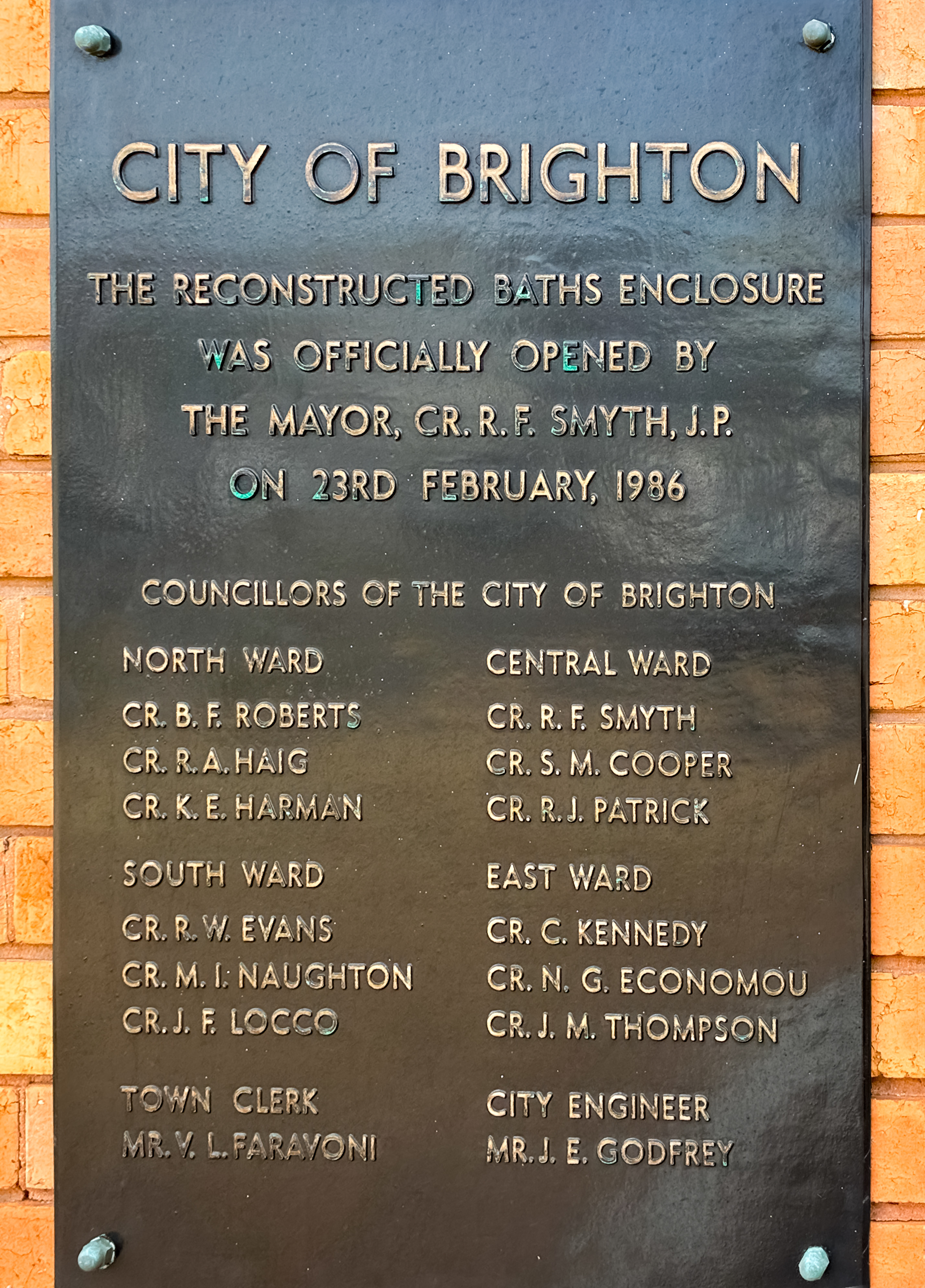
City of Brighton plaque from 1980's

=== City of Sandringham ===
The Moorabbin Road District was created in 1862 and became the Shire of Moorabbin in 1871. In 1917, parts of the West and South ridings were severed to create the Borough of Sandringham and three years later parts of the South and Cheltenham ridings were severed to create the Borough of Mentone and Mordialloc. The two boroughs became the Town of Sandringham and the Town of Mentone and Mordialloc in 1919 and 1923 respectively and Sandringham the City of Sandringham in 1923.

=== City of Moorabbin ===
Created a road district on 16 May 1862 and later proclaimed a shire in January 1871. A portion of Moorabbin Shire severed and annexed to Brighton Town in 1912 and a portion severed in 1917. The Borough of Mentone and Mordialloc was established in 1920 and re-subdivided in 1929 and later proclaimed a city in 1934.

=== City of Mordialloc ===
Created as the Borough of Mentone and Mordialloc by severance from Moorabbin Shire in May 1920. Redefined as a portion of Moorabbin Shire being severed and annexed in 1921. Declared a town in April 1923 and its name changed to Town of Mordialloc in April 1923 and later gazetted a city on 5 May 1926.

=== City of Bayside ===
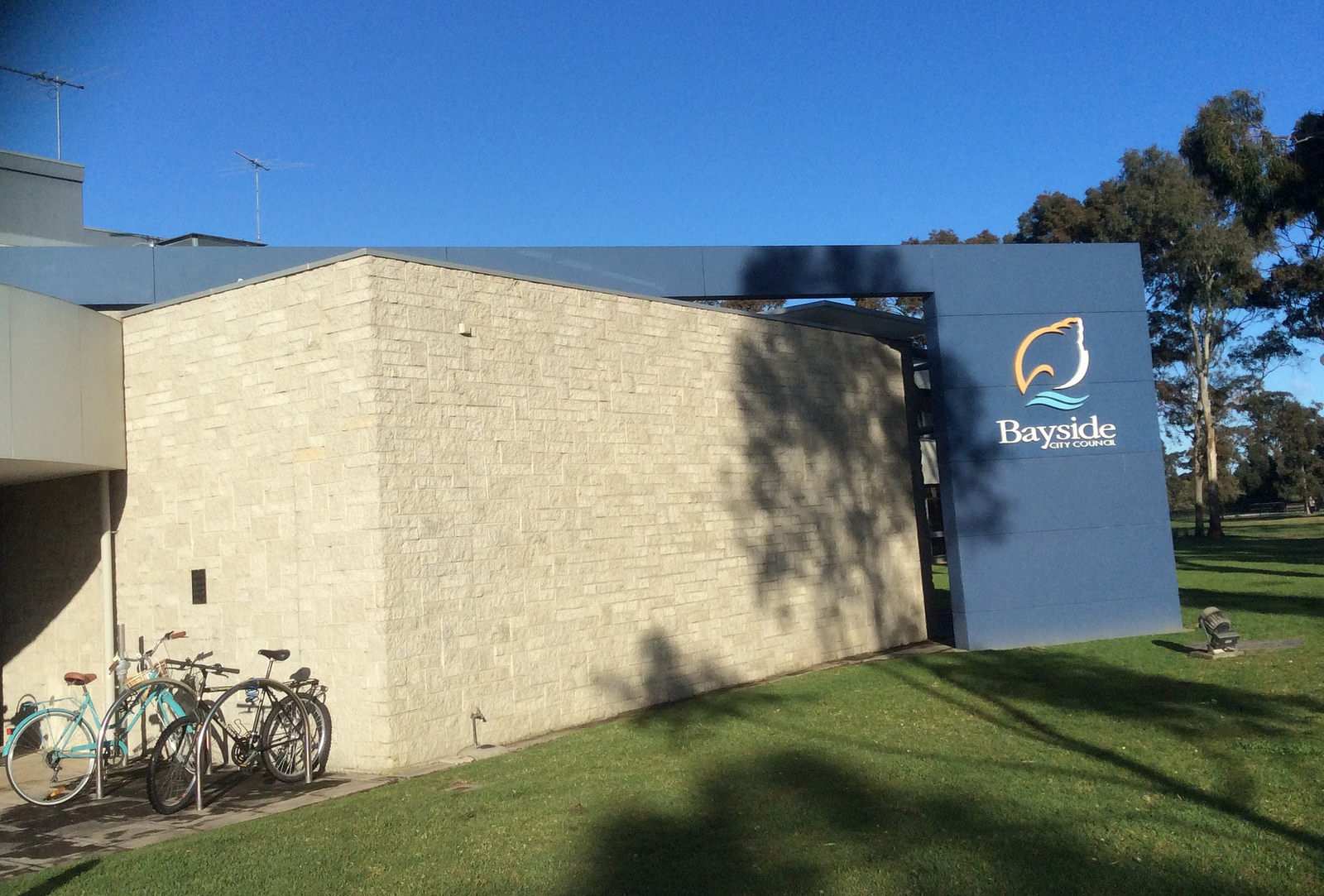
Bayside City Council corporate centre

On 15 December 1994 a new municipality was created to form Bayside City Council which comprises the former City of Brighton, the former City of Sandringham and part of the former City of Mordialloc west of Charman Road and part of the City of Moorabbin between the railway and Charman Road.

Under the initial proposal for the LGA, it was to be named "City of Warrain", warrain being a Boon wurrung word for "by the sea" (and also an earlier name for North Road), but the City of Sandringham proposed that the name "Bayside" be used instead.

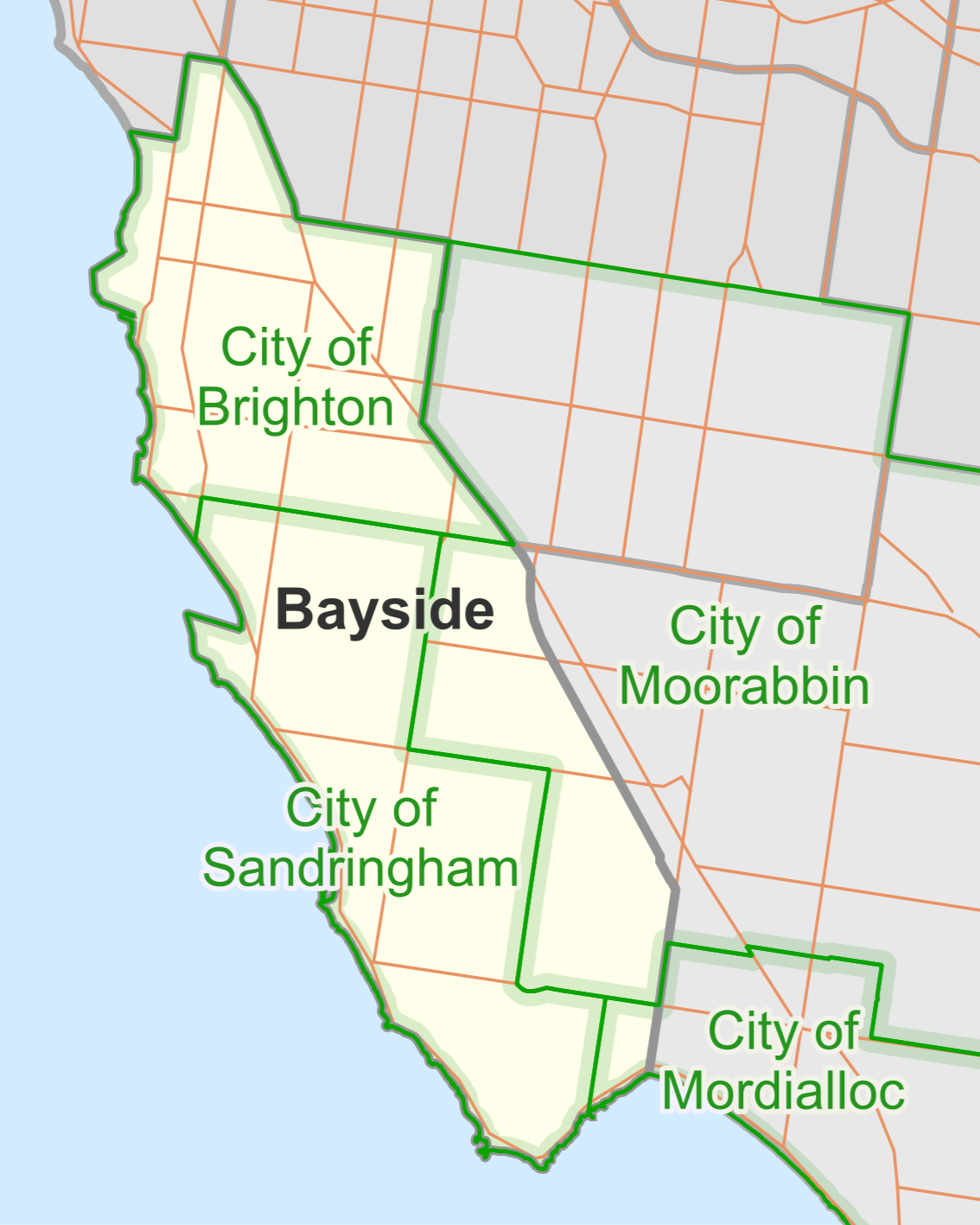
The City of Bayside's predecessor LGAs (green) as they were in 1994

Bayside was rated eighth of 590 Australian Local Government Areas in the Bankwest Quality of Life Index 2008.

== Council ==
=== Council composition ===
2020 and 2024 ward boundaries. Expand the map and click on a ward to see the ward name.

| Ward | Party | Councillor | Notes |
|---|---|---|---|
| Beckett | Independent Liberal | Debbie Taylor-Haynes | Mayor |
| Bleazby | Independent Liberal | Robert Irlicht | |
| Boyd | Independent | Kylie McIntosh | |
| Castlefield | Independent | Elli Murray | |
| Dendy | Independent | Hanna El Mouallem | |
| Ebden | Independent Liberal | Geoff Leigh | |
| Ivison | Independent | Andrew Hockley | Deputy Mayor |

== Past councillors ==
=== 1997−2008 (nine wards) ===
| Year | Abbott | Charman | Clayton | Dendy | Ebden | Mair | Moysey | Smith | Were |
| Year | Councillor | Councillor | Councillor | Councillor | Councillor | Councillor | Councillor | Councillor | Councillor |
|---|---|---|---|---|---|---|---|---|---|
| 1997 | Michael Harwood (Ind.) | Terry O'Brien (Ind.) | Craig Tucker (Ind.) | Elizabeth Francis (Ind.) | Simon Russell (Ind.) | Alex del Porto (Ind.) | Vivien Kluger (Ind.) | Graeme Disney (Ind.) | Jill McKiggan (Ind.) |
| 2000 | Nicholas Eden (Ind.) | Terry O'Brien (Ind.) | Craig Tucker (Ind.) | Gary Andrews (Ind.) | Simon Russell (Ind.) | Alex del Porto (Ind.) | Ken Beadle (Ind.) | Graeme Disney (Ind.) | Michael Heffernan (Liberal) |
| 2003 | Chris Carroll (Ind.) | Craig Tucker (Ind.) | Andrew McLorinan (Ind.) | Gary Andrews (Ind.) | Derek Wilson (Ind.) | Alex del Porto (Ind.) | Ken Beadle (Ind.) | Mike Dwyer (Ind.) | Tim Ryan (Ind.) |
| 2005 | Michael Norris (Ind.) | Terry O'Brien (Ind.) | Andrew McLorinan (Ind.) | Kristin Stegley (Ind.) | Derek Wilson (Ind.) | Alex del Porto (Ind.) | John Knight (Ind.) | James Long (Ind.) | Clifford Hayes (Ind.) |

=== 2008−2020 (three wards) ===
==== Central Ward ====
| Year | Councillor | Party | Councillor | Party | Councillor | Party |
|---|---|---|---|---|---|---|
| 2008 | James Long | Independent | Felicity Frederico | Liberal | Louise Cooper-Shaw | Independent |
| 2012 | James Long | Independent | Felicity Frederico | Liberal | Stephen Hartney | Liberal |
| 2014 | James Long | Independent | Felicity Frederico | Liberal | Bruce Lowe | Independent |
| 2016 | James Long | Independent | Rob Grinter | Liberal | Sonia Castelli | Independent |

==== Northern Ward ====
| Year | Councillor | Party | Councillor | Party |
|---|---|---|---|---|
| 2008 | Alex del Porto | Independent | Clifford Hayes | Independent |
| 2010 | Alex del Porto | Independent | Clifford Hayes | Sustainable Australia |
| 2012 | Alex del Porto | Independent | Michael Heffernan | Liberal |
| 2016 | Alex del Porto | Independent | Michael Heffernan | Liberal |

==== Southern Ward ====
| Year | Councillor | Party | Councillor | Party |
|---|---|---|---|---|
| 2008 | Michael Norris | Independent | Simon Russell | Independent |
| 2012 | Lawrence Evans | Independent | Heather Stewart | Independent |
| 2016 | Lawrence Evans | Independent | Clarke Martin | Independent |

=== 2020−2024 (seven wards) ===
| Ward | Party | Councillor | Notes |
|---|---|---|---|
| Beckett | Independent | Clarke Martin | |
| Bleazby | Independent | Alex Del Porto | |
| Boyd | Independent | Fiona Stitfold | |
| Castlefield | Independent | Jo Samuel-King | |
| Dendy | Independent | Hanna El Mouallem | Mayor |
| Ebden | Independent | Laurence Evans | |
| Ivison | Independent | Sonia Castelli | |

== Election results ==
=== 2024 ===
2024 Victorian local elections: Bayside
| Party | Votes | % | Swing | Seats | Change |
|---|---|---|---|---|---|
| Independent | 42,161 | 70.05 | –9.61 | 4 | ▼3 |
| Independent Liberal | 16,975 | 28.20 | +16.97 | 3 | ▲3 |
| Greens | 652 | 1.08 | –6.73 | 0 | Steady |
| Victorian Socialists | 402 | 0.67 | +0.67 | 0 | Steady |
| Formal votes | 60,190 | 94.82 | | | |
| Informal votes | 3,288 | 5.18 | | | |
| Total | 63,478 | 100.00 | | 7 | Steady |
| Registered voters / turnout | 75,633 | 83.93 | | | |

== Townships and localities ==
The 2021 census, the city had a population of 101,306 up from 97,087 in the 2016 census

Population
| Locality | 2016 | 2021 |
|---|---|---|
| Beaumaris | 13,349 | 13,947 |
| Black Rock | 6,159 | 6,389 |
| Brighton | 23,253 | 23,252 |
| Brighton East^ | 15,998 | 16,757 |
| Cheltenham^ | 22,291 | 23,992 |
| Hampton | 13,391 | 13,518 |
| Hampton East | 4,689 | 5,069 |
| Highett^ | 10,454 | 12,016 |
| Sandringham | 10,241 | 10,926 |

^ - Territory divided with another LGA

== Controversies ==
=== Fence signs in 2022 Federal Election campaign ===
Prompted by one of the candidates for the Goldstein federal electorate, the council warned residents against erecting candidate fence signs too early in the 2022 Federal Election campaign period. This was challenged in the Victorian Supreme Court by representatives of another candidate, which ruled that the signs were legal. The Age called the ruling a "humiliating result" for Bayside Council.

=== Suppression of accolades for volunteer award winner ===
16-year-old Zaina Amro was presented with Bayside's 2025 Julian Gurrieri Memorial Award for Bayside Youth Participation. This was celebrated in online forums of council and the recipient's school.

An article celebrating the award was published in "Let's Talk Bayside", the city's newsletter for residents, with a photograph on the front cover featuring the award recipient. Following delivery of a fraction of the physical newsletter to residents, letters of complaint were received by council from seven people, objecting to a small Palestine emblem on the necklace worn by the recipient. This prompted Bayside to destroy the remaining printed copies of the newsletter and reissue it without the article and with a different cover image.

The suppression of the accolades for Ms. Amro has been noted publicly in the Australian Parliament, and in the media.

== See also ==
- List of mayors of Bayside
- List of Melbourne suburbs
