= Kevin Lincoln =

Kevin Lincoln may refer to:

- Kevin Lincoln (artist)
- Kevin Lincoln (politician)
