= June Ethel Stephenson =

Australian artist (1914–1999)

June Ethel Stephenson (3 June 1914 – 1998) was an Australian visual artist, specifically a painter and print-maker. She was born in Melbourne and went to school at the National Gallery and George Bell schools in Melbourne and overseas.

== Biography ==
June Stephenson had a network of women artists in Melbourne with whom she was close friends, including Meg Benwell, Anne Graham, Judith Perrey and Margaret Dredge. Stephenson was part of an exhibition in 1961 of five female artists including Sue McDougall, Grace Somerville, Margaret Dredge and Inez Green. The group exhibition was held to raise funds for the Beaumaris Art Group.

At the George Bell School in Toorak that Stephenson met her close friend, traveling companion, and fellow artist: Anne Marie Graham. Stephenson and Graham went on sketching and painting expeditions in the Glass House Mountains during the winters of 1972 to 1979 when Stephenson lived at Broadbeach on the Gold Coast. They shared an exhibit at The Little Gallery, Davenport, Tasmania in 1970. They were also both featured in a 1968 exhibition, titled The Essentialists at the Pinacotheca Gallery in Melbourne.
