= 1943–44 Victorian bushfire season =

Series of bushfires in Victoria, Australia

The 1943–44 Victorian bushfire season was marked by a series of major bushfires following severe drought conditions in the state of Victoria in Australia. The summer of 1943–44 was the driest summer ever recorded in Melbourne with just 46 mm falling, a third of the average for the period. Between 22 December and 15 February 51 people were killed, 700 injured, and 650 buildings were destroyed across the state. Many personnel who would have been normally available for fire fighting duties had been posted overseas and to remote areas of Australia during World War II.

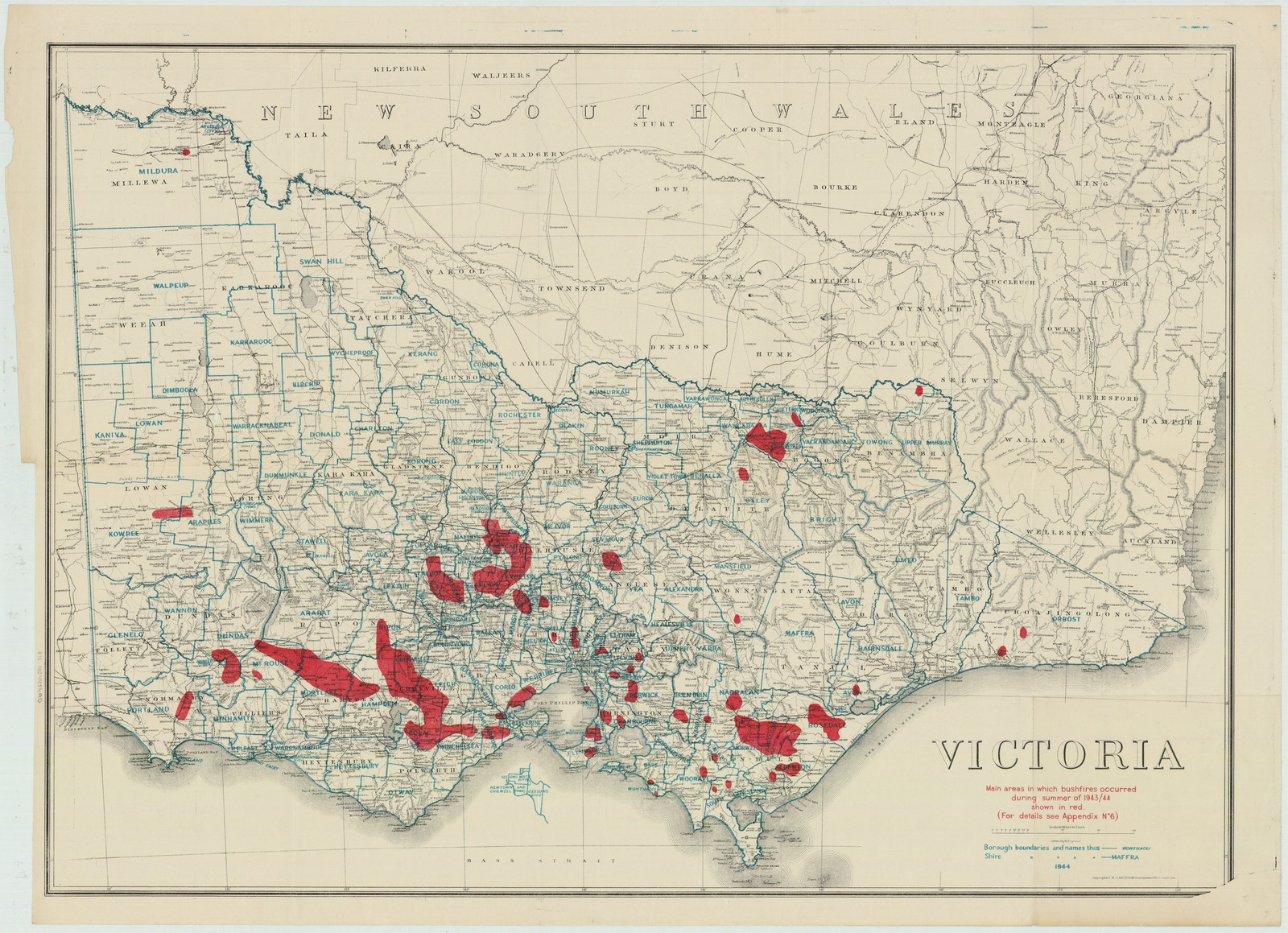
1943–44 Victorian bushfire season map

== 22 December 1943 ==
The first major fire was a grassfire at Wangaratta on 22 December which burnt hundreds of hectares and resulted in the deaths of 10 volunteer firefighters near Tarrawingee.

The fire started a short distance away from the Bowser railway yard. It is unclear how it started but the fire spread quickly and headed in a south easterly direction towards Tarrawingee. The fire swept through Londrigan and East Wangaratta, where several houses were damaged. The fire then crossed the Tarrawingee road and a change of wind drove the flames back upon a large party of fire-fighters who were attempting to create fire breaks. Most of the firefighters escaped in motor-cars and on bicycles, but five men were burnt to death. Five men later died in hospital.

Up to 1000 volunteers, including defence force personnel, help fight the flames during the night. In the morning the winds picked up again split the fire into two. The fires near Oxley Flat were first to be brought under control and the Ovens Valley section was stopped by the end of the second day.

== 14 January 1944 ==
On 14 January and the following day, fires broke out across the state. To the west of Melbourne, a series of bushfires broke out between South Australian border and the outskirts of Geelong. including areas near the towns of Skipton, Birregurra and Goroke. Many smaller towns were substantially damaged. In central Victoria, fires occurred near Daylesford, Woodend, Gisborne and Bendigo.

A fire that was started by sparking power lines threatened Hamilton; the fire that started to the west of town was fanned by strong blustering winds, and at one stage had three quarters of the town encircled. 40 houses were lost as well as the railway yards and buildings. The fire was contained eventually near Tarrington.

A fire that started on Mt Sturgeon in the Southern Grampians flared up and raced down the slopes, burnt out Dunkeld and kept going, then razed the towns of Dundonnell, Darlington, and Derrinallum; the only Derrinallum buildings left standing were the Mechanics' Institute, two churches and several business premises.

A fire negligently left burning just north of Skipton aided by strong northerly winds left a trail of destruction that continued all the way South to Colac a distance of almost 100 kilometres. Eleven people were killed and two youths were convicted. The youths were droving sheep, lit a fire to boil a billy, but failed to extinguish the fire properly. When they had droved their flock about half a mile they saw the fire had started up again and spread quickly amid the grass. From that spot the fire swept along in high dry grass to the west of Skipton. Fanning out and gaining a much broader front the fire continued on and swept Bradvale, Mt Bute, Berrybank, Werneth, on to Cressy, where the fire split and went round the town on either side. The fire passed east of Lismore, but did not enter that town.

Another fire that started on the Warrorie Estate near Irrawarra destroyed 20 houses and burnt out Warncourt and threatened the township of Birregurra from three sides. Five houses were burnt in town. A wind change re-directed the fire to open country in the North East. The fire was brought under control near Mt. Gellibrand.

In the Melbourne area, 63 homes were destroyed in the tea tree lined streets of Sandringham, Beaumaris, and Black Rock. Another fire in the northern suburbs of Melbourne burnt down 5 houses in the Glenroy – Pascoe Vale area.

== 14 February 1944 ==
On 14 February a fire broke out near Hearnes Oak and quickly took hold and destroyed 16 houses and the post office before moving on to Morwell where it burnt down 40 houses and 3 people were killed. The fire also destroyed 40 houses and caused 3 deaths in the Traralgon area.

A wildfire took hold and burnt acreage from Frankston to Hastings. Townships of Langwarrin, Pearcedale and Baxter were damaged as the fire when through. 300 volunteers fought the blaze on a 12 mile front. In the evening light rain assisted firefighters get the blaze under control.

Houses were also reported lost in Leongatha, Wonthaggi, Warragul and Koondrook.

A Royal Commission was held into the Yallourn fires in 1944.

A Royal Commission into the Yallourn fires was held by Judge Leonard Edward Bishop Stretton and a major outcome following the fires was the establishment of the Country Fire Authority in 1945 to co-ordinate rural fire brigades.
