= Grant House, Beaumaris =

Heritage-listed house in Melbourne, Victoria, Australia

Grant House
- Location of the house in Greater Metropolitan Melbourne

General information
- Status: Completed
- Type: House
- Architectural style: Modernist
- Location: 14 Pasadena Avenue, Beaumaris, City of Bayside, Melbourne, Victoria, Australia
- Coordinates: 37°59′05″S 145°01′50″E
- Completed: 1956; 70 years ago
- Client: Alan and Barbara Grant

Technical details
- Structural system: Bowstring truss
- Material: Bricks; timber

Design and construction
- Architect: Peter McIntyre
- Engineer: Bill Irwin

Victorian Heritage Register
- Official name: Grant House
- Type: Registered place
- Criteria: a., d.
- Designated: 29 August 2019
- Reference no.: H2392
- Category: Residential buildings (private)

Grant House is a house located at 14 Pasadena Avenue in Beaumaris, in the City of Bayside, in the south eastern suburbs of Melbourne, in Victoria, Australia.

Built in 1956 on the traditional lands of the Bunurong people, the house was added to the Victorian Heritage Register on 29 August 2019 in recognition of its historical and architectural significance.

== History ==
=== Post war Victoria ===
Following World War II, Victoria experienced a period of extreme austerity combined with an increasing population. There were severe shortages of building materials and skilled labour which imposed constraints on the construction of new homes. By the 1950s, the social and cultural environments of Victoria were changing. This was partially influenced by the traditions, culture and foods introduced by European migrants but also by Australian born artists, architects, musicians, performers and restauranteurs who were creating a new 'modern' Australia.

In architecture, approaches to domestic living were changing, with a new casualness and positivity expressing itself through open plan living and a new appreciation and connection to the landscape. Increased car ownership also allowed for the construction of houses on comparatively large blocks in new suburbs away from the city. Combined with the development of new materials and the need for cost-effective housing solutions, this resulted in innovative approaches to design, construction and planning by emerging and newly established architects such as Robin Boyd, Roy Grounds, Mockridge, Stahle and Mitchell, Peter McIntyre, Kevin Borland, and Neil Clerehan.

=== Beaumaris and the modernist house ===
In the 1930s, the Dunlop-Perdieu Company purchased approximately 73 hectares (180 acres) at Beaumaris for development. The development did not proceed and in the early 1950s, the land began to be sold off. It was one of the last substantial pockets of undeveloped land in the middle-ring suburbs and attracted many leading architects who designed houses for themselves. It also attracted home owners who built architect designed houses or off-the-shelf designed housing from project housing companies, or from the Royal Victorian Institute of Architects (RVIA) Small Homes Service. The Bayside Heritage Study noted that the significance of Beaumaris as an epicentre for modern residential architecture in the post-war period was acknowledged by many including Boyd, Clerehan and, more recently, Philip Goad.

=== RVIA Small Homes Service ===
The Royal Victorian Institute of Architects established the Small Homes Service in 1947. It provided architect-designed plans and specifications for purchase, as well as advice about selecting a suitable block of land. The Age featured a selection of the house designs in a weekly article which was also aimed at educating and informing the public about contemporary design.

=== Peter McIntyre and his work ===
Peter McIntyre was born in Kew, Melbourne in 1927. His father was a commercial architect and McIntyre worked for him as an "office-boy" from the age of eight. After finishing school, McIntyre studied architecture at the Melbourne Technical College before attending The University of Melbourne. In 1947 he completed the first year of the Atelier course which was a high regarded but demanding course. In the same year Brian Lewis was appointed The Age Chair of Architecture at the university. He engaged new teachers including Mockridge, Rae Featherston, Boyd, Grounds, Fred Romberg, and Fritz Janeba. This contributed to an exciting and energetic university experience for McIntyre and others including John Murphy, Clerehan, and Borland who would also become renowned architects. McIntyre completed university in 1950 and immediately went into private practice; and he also taught at the university and assisted Boyd with the RVIA Small Homes Service. McIntyre partnered with Borland in 1951 and they met engineer Bill Irwin who worked in the same building. The 1950s was a decade of experimentation and success for McIntyre. He produced some of his most experimental and well-known buildings including the Beulah Hospital, the Stargazer House, the Brunt House, the Snelleman House, the River House (designed for McIntyre and his architect wife Dione, who he married in 1954), and the Olympic Swimming Stadium – the latter designed in association with Borland, John and Phyllis Murphy, and Bill Irwin.

The bowstring truss houses were designed in this period as well as a series of modular steel framed houses. One of these houses, the McCarthy House, led to legal proceedings which diminished McIntyre's confidence in working experimentally. He travelled overseas while his wife Dione remained in Melbourne to manage the practice. On his return, he focussed on commercial work to gain more knowledge of the building industry before returning to experimental design.

=== Bowstring truss series ===
The bowstring truss series of houses was designed by McIntyre as a cost-effective housing solution in the postwar period. The cost of a bowstring truss house was thirty per cent less than the cost of conventional houses. The design included concrete slab floors at a time when most houses had timber floors, and bowstring trusses to provide open internal spaces which could be reconfigured with the insertion of non-loadbearing walls.

The engineering computations for the bowstring trusses were completed by Bill Irwin and allowed for them to be easily constructed from readily available five-by-three-centimetre (two-by-one-inch) timber sections. A version of the bowstring truss house design was published in The Age on 28 March 1955 as part of the Small Homes Service (Design T40). The bowstring truss series of modular houses are described by Goad as McIntyre's most successful attempt at creating experimental housing, as they were based on traditional materials and methods. The first of these houses was the Sierakowski House constructed in Bairnsdale in 1954 (completed later). Another three houses were constructed in 1955 (Hartley House, Kyneton; Baxter House, Oakleigh and Kerr House, Templestowe), followed by four in 1956 (Clarkson House, Ringwood; Layton House, Jordanville; Pearce House, North Balwyn and Grant House, Beaumaris).

On the available evidence, the Grant House is the most intact surviving example of McIntyre's eight bowstring truss houses. Others were demolished or substantially altered. The Sierakowski and Baxter houses were both altered and the Hartley House were either demolished or substantially rebuilt. Other examples were located.

=== Grant House ===
In 1956, Alan and Barbara Grant commissioned McIntyre to design a two-bedroom home for them on a block of land in the newly formed suburb of Beaumaris. The resulting home was a bowstring truss design comprising two offset modules with curved roofs and exposed bowstring trusses internally connected by a central section containing the kitchen, bathroom and laundry. The interior was originally painted in a bright multicoloured Tip Top Paint scheme. The Grant's daughter Sue recalls 'aubergine, coral and yellow walls with grey carpet, black and white chequered tiles in the entry, and black and white striped wallpaper in the dining room.' Alan and Barbara Grant took out a War Service Loan of £3,500 to complete the home and lived in it their entire lives.

Prior to adding to the Victorian Heritage Register, the house was listed for sale in September 2018.

== See also ==
- Architecture of Melbourne
- List of places on the Victorian Heritage Register in the City of Bayside
