= Owen Phillips (general) =

Australian Army officer

- Born: 9 June 1882; Warwick, Queensland
- Died: 15 May 1966 (aged 83); Beaumaris, Victoria
- Military career
- Allegiance: Australia
- Branch: Australian Army
- Service years: 1900–1942
- Rank: Major General
- Commands: 1st Infantry Division (1933–34); 1st Divisional Artillery (1921–22); 2nd Divisional Artillery (1917–19); 14th Field Artillery Brigade (1916–17); 4th Battery, 2nd Field Artillery Brigade (1914–15)
- Conflicts: First World War; Gallipoli campaign; Landing at Anzac Cove; Battle of Lone Pine; Western Front; Battle of Bullecourt; Third Battle of Ypres; Battle of Mont Saint-Quentin; Second World War
- Awards: Companion of the Order of St Michael and St George; Distinguished Service Order; Mentioned in Despatches (7); Knight of the Order of Saints Maurice and Lazarus (Italy); Army Distinguished Service Medal (United States)

Major General Owen Forbes Phillips, CMG, DSO (9 June 1882 – 15 May 1966) was a senior officer in the Australian Army who spent much of his career in artillery and ordnance.
