= David Godsell House =

Heritage-listed house in Melbourne, Victoria, Australia

- Location of the house in Greater Metropolitan Melbourne

General information
- Status: Completed
- Type: House
- Architectural style: Modernist
- Location: 491 Balcombe Road, Beaumaris, City of Bayside, Melbourne, Victoria, Australia
- Coordinates: 37°58′38″S 145°01′43″E
- Completed: 1961; 65 years ago
- Client: David and Ursula ('Terry') Godsell
- Owner: Godsell family (1956–2008)

Technical details
- Material: Bricks; Californian Redwood timber; stones
- Floor area: 192 m^{2} (2,070 sq ft)
- Grounds: 935 m^{2} (10,060 sq ft)

Design and construction
- Architect: David Godsell

Website
- beaumarismodern.com.au

Victorian Heritage Register
- Official name: David Godsell House
- Type: Registered place
- Criteria: d.
- Designated: 24 May 2018
- Reference no.: H2379
- Heritage overlay no.: HO412
- Category: Residential buildings (private)

The David Godsell House is a house located at 491 Balcombe Road in Beaumaris, in the City of Bayside, in the south eastern suburbs of Melbourne, in Victoria, Australia.

Built between 1960 and 1961 on the traditional lands of the Bunurong people, the house was added to the Victorian Heritage Register on 24 May 2018 in recognition of its architectural significance; and was also added to a non-statutory list by the Victorian branch of the National Trust on 2 October 2008.

== History ==
David Godsell and his wife, Ursula ('Terry') Godsell, purchased the 491 Balcombe Road site in November 1956. The David Godsell House is the realisation of a design for himself and his family upon this site and was documented by Godsell during the first half of 1960. The majority of the present-day house was constructed between mid-1960 and the early months of 1961. Small spaces also designed by Godsell were added to the house during the Godsell family's occupation of the house in subsequent years - a home-office (studio) in c. 1966, laundry adjacent to the kitchen in c. 1970, and an additional upper-storey bathroom and bedroom in c. 1972. Prior to his death in 1986, Godsell conducted his architectural practice from the studio at 491 Balcombe Road. Terry Godsell continued to live in the house until 2008.

As of 2018, very little change had occurred to the house since that time, apart from the addition of an outdoor timber decking area to the north of the living room, and a cylindrical concrete plunge pool and associated timber steps, decking, safety fence and gate to the central courtyard's western edge.

== Description ==
The David Godsell House is a freestanding single-family dwelling, built in the Modernist style, sited centrally within a roughly rectangular 935-square-metre (10,060 sq ft) site. Its external walls are predominantly of Californian Redwood cladding boards and fawn-coloured face brickwork. The house is a careful composition of rectilinear flat-roofed wings, three of which face inwards towards a sheltered courtyard. The 30-centimetre (12 in) Californian Redwood boards which clad the house also feature prominently in its interiors. The living room features a large linear skylight of timber-framed topaz panes of glass, the western end of which terminates in a junction with the house's face brick chimney. The corners and edges of this chimney - and of other panels of brickwork in the house - feature toothed and recessed bricks in alternate courses, creating richly textured surfaces. Joints between panes of window glass at the external corners of rooms, and between the horizontal and vertical glass along the living room skylight's northern edge, have been mitred and glued with great care. Soffits of the carport and entry roofs - and the wide eaves of other roofs - are lined with the same 30-centimetre (12 in) Californian Redwood boards used on the house's external and internal wall surfaces, subtly vertically stepped and also mitred at the corner junctions.

Much of the house's interior materials and finishes remain in their original state, including the unpainted face brickwork; timber wall and ceiling lining boards; internal doors; built-in furniture and open shelves; storage cupboards; kitchen cabinetry and shelves; and some of the fixtures within the bathrooms. The house's original and carefully concealed ceiling-mounted fluorescent tube lighting also appears intact. Free-standing external brick walls, including the wall along the Balcombe Road street boundary, feature courses of toothed and recessed bricks detailed similarly to those deployed within the house.

The house is important as an example of the Godsell's work and incorporated his personal design philosophy; that buildings should embrace and enhance the natural beauty of their site. In this his architecture owed much to the influence of the American architect, Frank Lloyd Wright, especially his projects from the 1930s to the 1950s, the 'Usonian' period. The building is Godsell's earliest and most Wrightian-inspired house. In the admiration of Wright's work he was part of a group of other influential young Victorian architects who were trying to find new solutions for domestic architecture.

== See also ==
- Architecture of Melbourne
- List of places on the Victorian Heritage Register in the City of Bayside
