= Douglas Stubbs =

Australian artist

Douglas Stubbs (1927–2008) was an Australian artist. Born in the country town of Leongatha in South Gippsland, Victoria he arrived in Melbourne as a young man to study at art school. Stubbs studied at the National Gallery School in Melbourne. Best known for his colourful surrealist paintings, frequently of birds, he held the first of several exhibitions in Melbourne in 1964.Sometimes described as "naive art", his highly imaginative works have been displayed in galleries all over the country. Stubbs is considered to be an under-recognised artist.
