= Kevin Lincoln (artist) =

- Born: 1941 (age 84–85); Battery Point, Tasmania
- Known for: Painting, Drawing, Etching, Lithography, Printmaking

Kevin Lincoln (born 1941) is an Australian artist.

== Life and work ==
Kevin Lincoln was born in Battery Point, Hobart in 1941 and moved to Melbourne in the 1960s, where he has lived and worked ever since. Receiving little to no formal art training, in order to make a living before he could devote his time to art Lincoln worked various jobs, including as a welder and boilermaker. His early works are predominantly linocuts. The effect of the harsh and contrasting line work that is conducive to the medium, effectively reflects the sparsity of the industrial landscape that surrounded him during this early period. It was not until the 1970s that Lincoln began to work within the more dynamic medium of paint.

Lincoln has been described as Australia's most introverted and underrated artists by art critic John McDonald. Despite his introverted nature, Lincoln is widely admired for his still lifes, self-portraits and etchings, all of which embody a sense of restraint and austerity. Recurring themes throughout his work have included age, mortality and the solitary figure. Stylistically, his is work has developed from expressive social realism to abstraction,. though was sometimes regarded as provocative; in 1969 his drawing of a naked figure both eating and defecating smaller figures [with] the caption "Don't get caught up in the system,'" was seized from Jill Jolliffe's Alice's Restaurant Bookshop in Greville Street, Prahran.

At over 70 years of age Lincoln continues to develop his practice as a rigorous draughtsman, printmaker and painter.

== Exhibitions ==
Lincoln has exhibited consistently for over 50 years. He gained visibility within the Melbourne art scene in 1964 when his work was exhibited with the Victorian Artists Society drawing and print exhibition. Lincoln went onto exhibit with The Social Realist Group throughout the 1960s in galleries across Australia.

He has held more than 50 solo exhibitions, such as Kevin Lincoln: The Eye’s Mind, Art Gallery of Ballarat, 2016, Victoria & Queen Victoria Museum and Art Gallery, Launceston, Tasmania; Still lifes and landscapes, 2013, Liverpool Street Gallery, Sydney; The Sea in Winter, 2005, Niagara Galleries, Melbourne; and Survey Exhibition 1977–88, 1988, Mornington Peninsula Regional Gallery, Victoria. He has also participated in over 100 group exhibitions throughout Australia, including Blue Chip XIX: The Collectors’ Exhibition, 2017, Niagara Galleries, Melbourne; A Fine Line: Drawings from the collection, 2016, Gippsland Art Gallery, Sale, Victoria; Artist Artists, 2011, Benalla Art Gallery, Victoria; Snap Freeze: Still Life in the Twenty-first Century, 2007, TarraWarra Museum of Art, Victoria; To Look Within: Self Portraits in Australia, 2004, National Portrait Gallery, Canberra; and with the Dobell Drawing Prize Exhibition, 1994, at the Art Gallery of New South Wales. He has also participated in numerous art fairs, such as the Melbourne Art Fair from 2000 to 2014 and the Second, Third and Fourth Australian Contemporary Art Fairs in 1990, 1992, and 1994.

== Collections and awards ==
Lincoln's work appears in the permanent collections of major Australian galleries such as the National Gallery of Australia, National Gallery of Victoria, Art Gallery of New South Wales and Tasmanian Museum and Art Gallery, as well as numerous state, regional, university and private collections throughout Australia. His work has also been recognised through grants, scholarships and awards. These have included, but are not limited to the 2013 Lloyd Rees Art Prize, Colville Gallery, Hobart; the 1997 Amcor Paper Awards, Westpac Gallery, Melbourne; the Henri Worland Print Award, Warrnambool, Victoria; and the 1977 Diamond Valley Art Award, Diamond Valley Civic Centre, Melbourne.
