= John Harry Grainger =

Australian architect and civil engineer

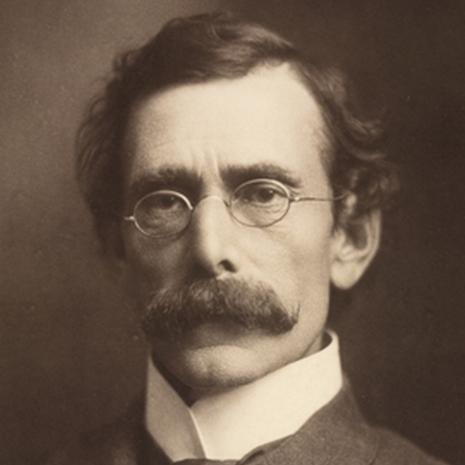
- Grainger in 1901
- Born: 30 November 1854; Westminster, London, England
- Died: 13 April 1917 (aged 62); Melbourne, Victoria, Australia
- Resting place: Box Hill Cemetery, Melbourne
- Spouse: Rose Annie Aldridge (m. 1880)
- Children: Percy Grainger
- Engineering career
- Discipline: civil engineer
- Projects: Princes Bridge, Sale Swing Bridge

John Harry Grainger (30 November 1854 – 15 April 1917) was an Australian architect and civil engineer, who was also the father of musician Percy Grainger. Over his long career, between 1878 and 1915, he designed 14 bridges, notably Princes Bridge in Melbourne, and as an architect, designed half a dozen major public buildings, mainly in New Zealand, Perth, and Melbourne, notably the WA Supreme Court. He also designed some major commercial buildings in Melbourne (mostly demolished) such as Georges Store.

== Family background ==
Grainger was born at 1 New Street, Westminster, Central London, into a Northumbrian family of builders, architects and engineers. His parents were John Grainger, a master tailor, and Mary Ann Grainger, née Parsons. He grew up in Durham. Percy Grainger related that he was told "Grainger Street" in Newcastle-on-Tyne was so called because an uncle or other relative had built most of the houses in the street. John Grainger appears to have lived with an uncle while in England, but as his parents were not deceased—they are listed as still living in Westminster in the 1881 census—it is unclear why. Winifred Falconer, his companion later in life, wrote in an unpublished manuscript in the mid-1930s that he lived with an uncle who was an important influence on him during his childhood. The gentleman was a personal friend of the great theologian Cardinal Newman and the young Grainger "derived great pleasure as well as knowledge from listening to their discussions of the world’s affairs". His uncle was also interested in music and took Grainger to his personal box at the opera. Percy believed that his father received much of his education at a monastery school in France at Yvetot (between Le Havre and Paris).

== Early career ==
Grainger started his engineering training when he was fifteen, in the office of William E. Wilson MICE of Dean's Yard, Westminster. Wilson was a well-connected consultant to contractors for railway and other big projects. Grainger also studied architecture under I. J. Eden & W. K. Green of Westminster. In the mid-1870s, while still in Wilson's employ, Grainger travelled throughout Europe, visiting Spain, Italy and France. An article in the Melbourne Age disclosed that Grainger learned how to construct iron bridges in London. "[He] worked with Mr Wilson, the well-known engineer of the Metro. District Railways and with him, iron bridge making has been a special study".

== Career in Australia ==
=== Eastern states ===
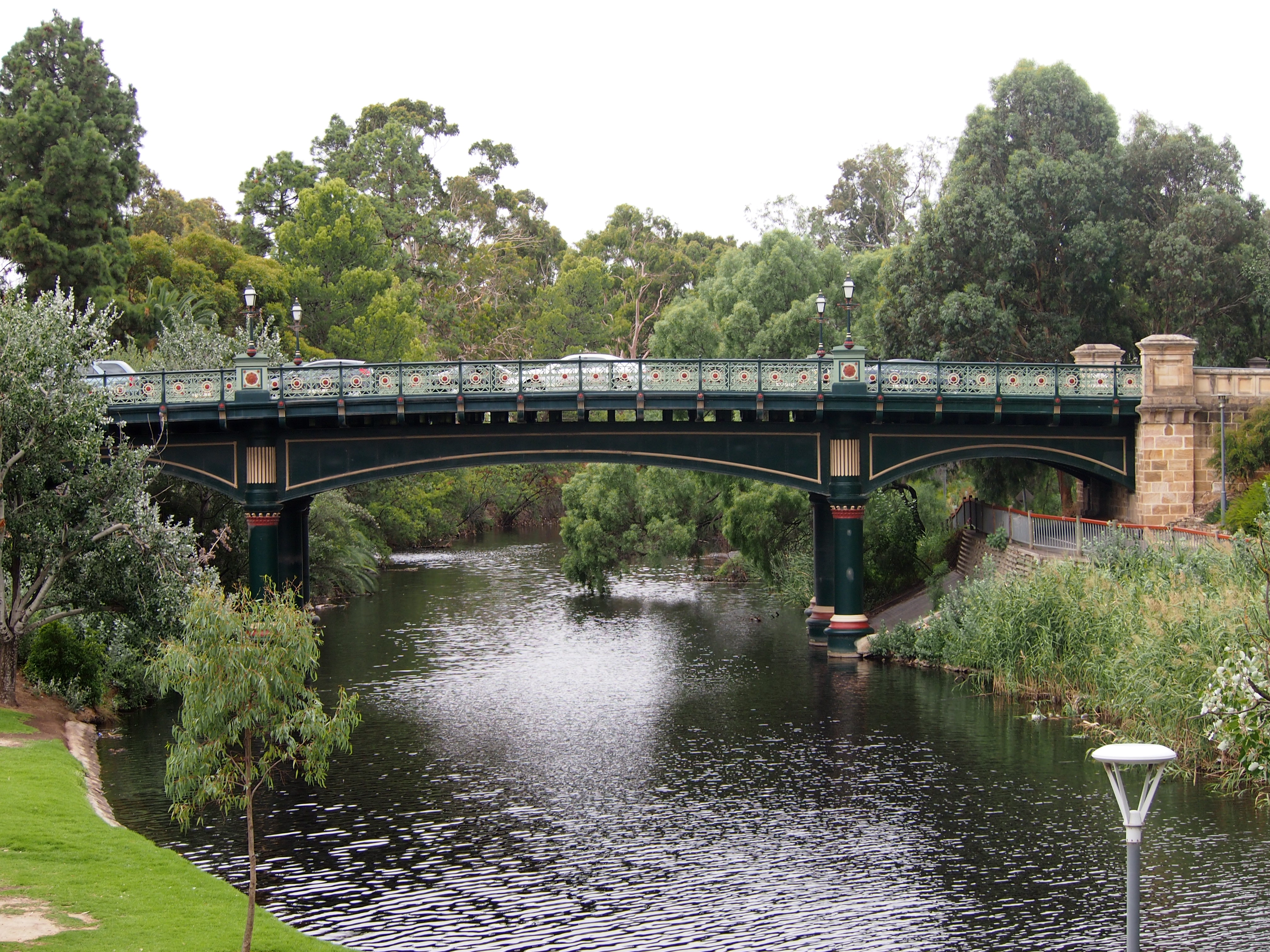
Albert Bridge, Adelaide, carries Frome Road across the River Torrens

In 1877, at the age of 22, Grainger travelled to Australia and took a position in the office of A. C. Mais, Engineer-in-Chief of the South Australian Public Works Department. He resigned in July 1878 after he had won a design competition for the Albert Bridge in Adelaide and was starting to get private work from a number of wealthy clients, including Robert Barr Smith (Auchendarroch House and Torrens Park House) and Thomas Elder. Grainger became involved in the musical life of Adelaide, organised the first local string quartet, and provided space in his house for them to rehearse. Percy Grainger ascribes some of his exposure to music early on in his father's love of music.

After winning two major bridge design competitions, most notably for Princes Bridge Melbourne, and for the Sale Swing Bridge in 1879, he visited Victoria for the first time in February 1880 to inspect the Sale site. In October 1880 he married Rose Annie Aldridge, daughter of an Adelaide hotel-keeper, in St Matthew's Church in Marryatville. In 1882, the couple moved to Victoria and settled in the Melbourne suburb of North Brighton, where their only son, christened George Percy Grainger, was born on 8 July 1882.

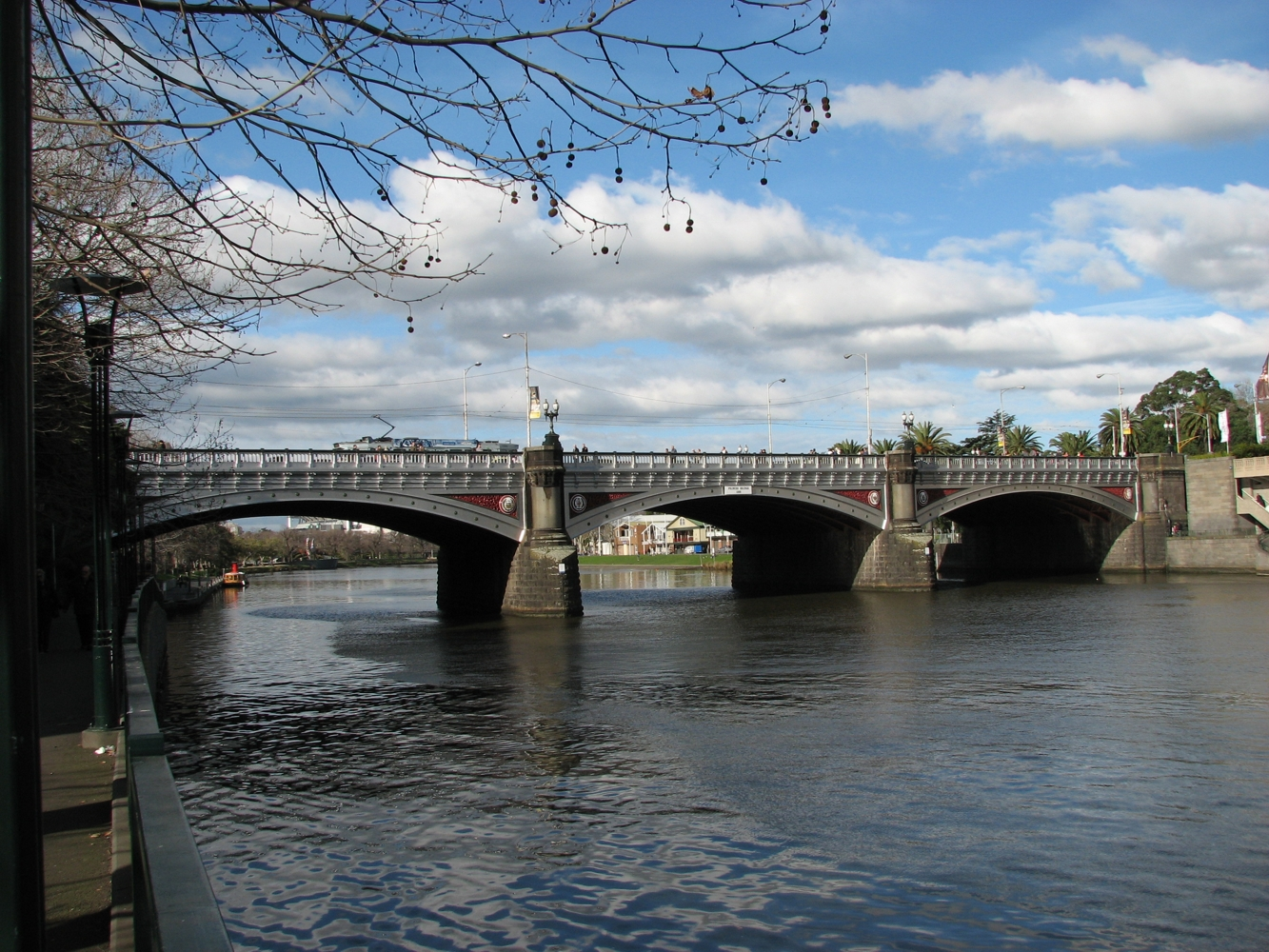
Princes Bridge, Melbourne, designed by John Grainger

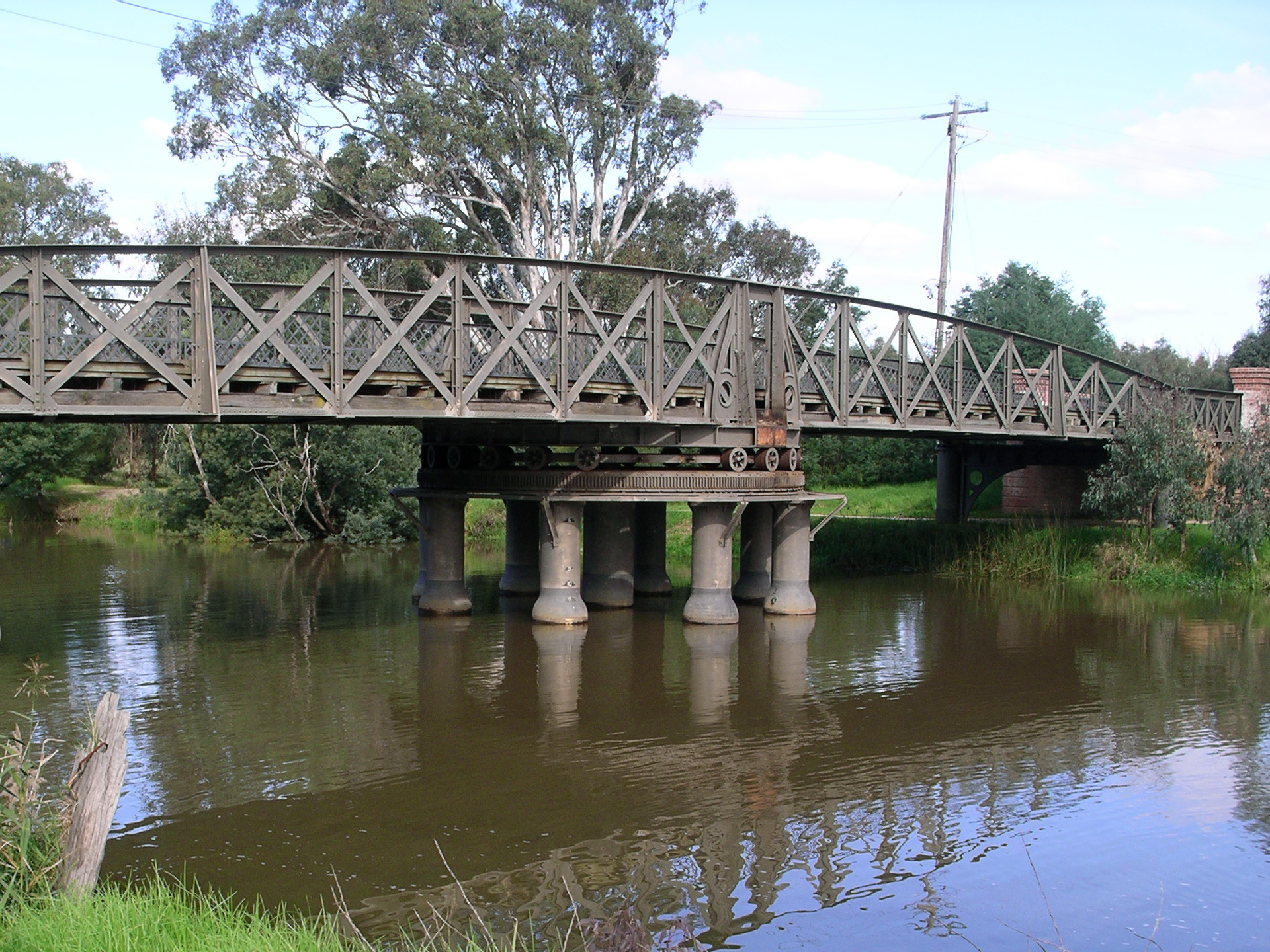
Sale Swing Bridge, in closed position

John Grainger was an accomplished artist, with broad cultural interests and a wide circle of friends. These included David Mitchell, whose daughter Helen later gained worldwide fame as an operatic soprano under the name Nellie Melba. Many years later in 1912, he designed extensions to Coombe Cottage, Melba's home in Coldstream.

For four years (1881–1885), he worked in partnership with an old friend, Charles D'Ebro, with whom he had sailed from England and with whom he had also worked in the South Australian Public Works Department. They designed many notable buildings together, not just in Melbourne, such as the Fremantle Town Hall in 1881, and in 1884 won the competition to design Auckland's public library and municipal offices (now the Auckland Art Gallery Toi o Tāmaki). Other notable designs included the 1884 Equitable Co-operative in Collins Street (later occupied by Georges (store), and a grand Masonic Hall on the Collins Street hill (demolished). The partnership ended in 1885, and it would appear that the friendship later faltered, as D'Ebro failed to provide effective support for Grainger's nomination in September 1906 as a Fellow of the Royal Victorian Institute of Architects (RVIA). Grainger then practiced alone, designing the Maryborough School of Arts, and in 1887-8 was the engineer for the striking six-storey red brick Robur Tea House in South Melbourne, where he devised a unique solution of 450 ironbark piles and concrete rafts to cope with the swampy soil.

Grainger was a heavy drinker and a womaniser who, Rose learned after the marriage, had fathered a child in England before coming to Australia. His promiscuous lifestyle placed heavy strains upon the relationship, particularly when Rose discovered shortly after Percy's birth that she had contracted a form of syphilis from her husband. Despite this, the Graingers stayed together until 1890, when John made a brief visit to England in a failed effort to see his father. At that time he was in very poor health from excessive drinking and smoking, and impoverished, having "lost all in over speculation in mines".

On his return to Australia he settled in Adelaide, living for a year or so with his wife's sister May and her husband George Sydney Aldridge. Most of his watercolour paintings (of which there are 10 in the Grainger Museum) date from this second Adelaide period. By 1895, he had sworn off drinking whisky and resumed a productive career which was undoubtedly enhanced by a happy relationship with a new life partner, Winifred Falconer. Following a share slump in Adelaide, the two moved in 1896 to Kalgoorlie, Western Australia, where a major gold rush was in progress and he resided there for some three months, employed by Adelaide mining and cement entrepreneur, Richard Durrant Langley.

=== Western Australia ===
Though Western Australia was booming in the 1890s, the eastern states were then in recession and he was fortunate to be appointed Principal Architect in the Architectural Division of the Public Works Department at a salary of £600, commencing 1 March 1897, a position which he held until 31 July 1905 when he retired owing to ill health. Hillson Beasley had been acting in the position since November 1903. His projects included the Government House ballroom (1899), Supreme Court, former Perth Museum, Library and Art Gallery, Parliament House, Perth (1899–1904), Perth Central Police Courts, the Old Northam Railway Station, and a number of substantial goldfields buildings, including the Warden's Court, Coolgardie and the Public Buildings in Kalgoorlie.

=== Return to Victoria ===
After pursuing a curative journey in Europe with his companion Winifred Falconer, Grainger returned to Melbourne in 1906, where he was awarded first prize in a design competition for the administrative block of the Melbourne Town Hall. Though experiencing the debilitating symptoms and pain of tertiary syphilis, he continued in practice in partnership with Phillip Kennedy and John Little as Grainger, Kennedy and Little. By 1910 the firm was reduced to Grainger and Little but continued to secure significant projects, including the first stage of the State Savings Bank in Elizabeth Street, and Collins House (both now demolished). Grainger retired in 1915, but his name lived on in the firm Grainger, Little and Barlow for many years. He died two years later in 1917, and was buried at Box Hill Cemetery in an unmarked grave. A headstone was finally erected in 2013.

== Gallery ==
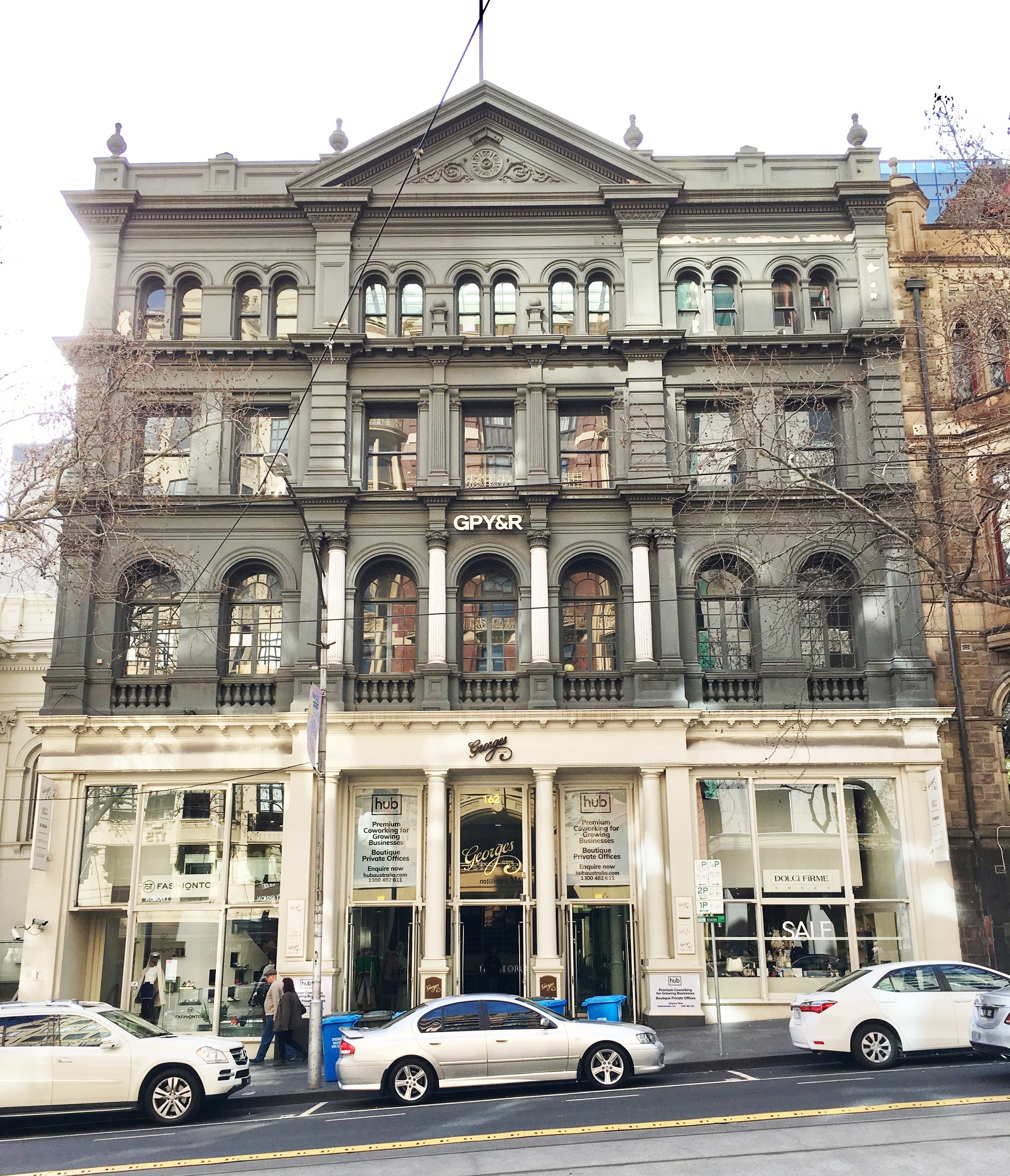
Equitable Store, later Georges, Collins Street, 1884

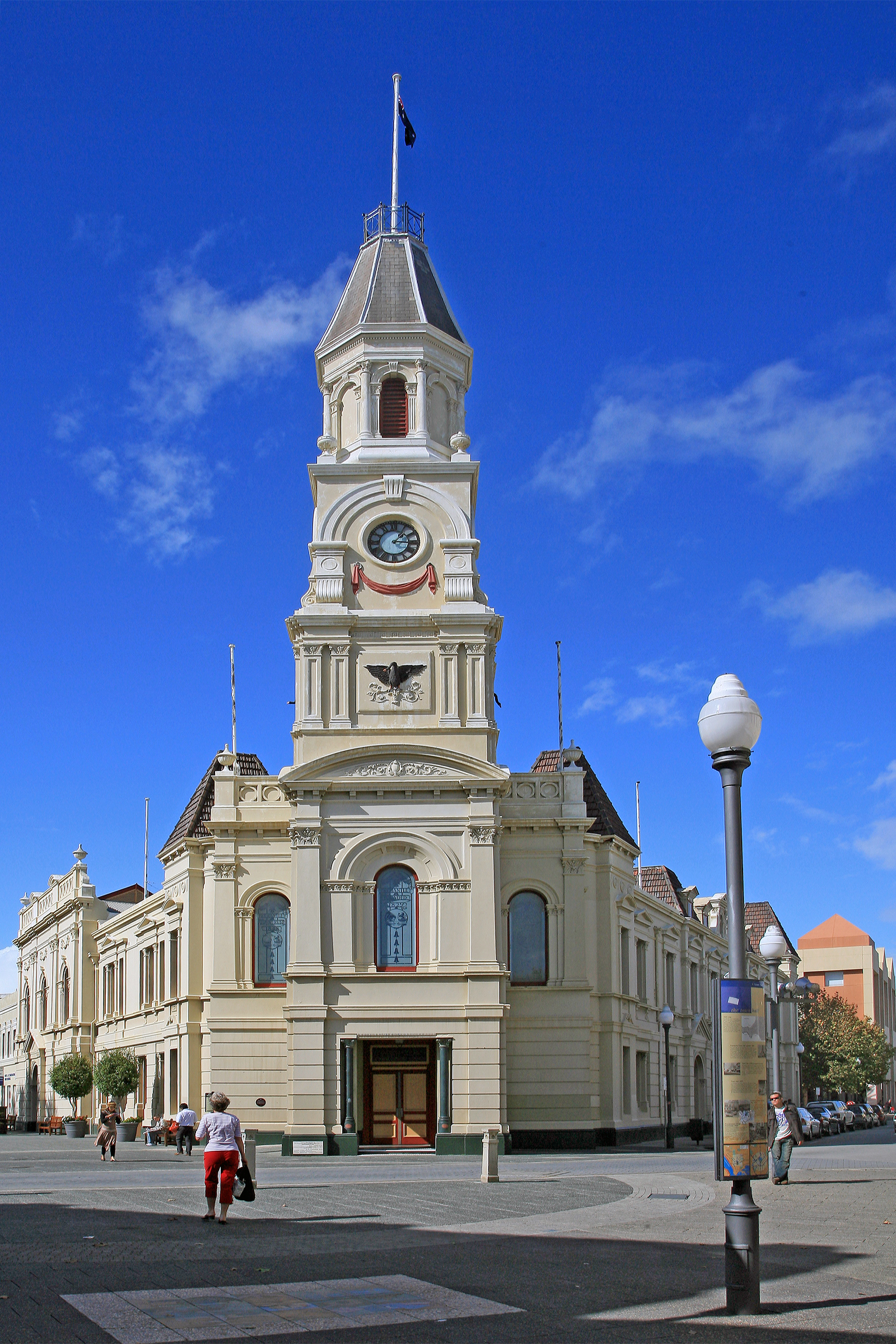
Fremantle Town Hall, Perth, 1887

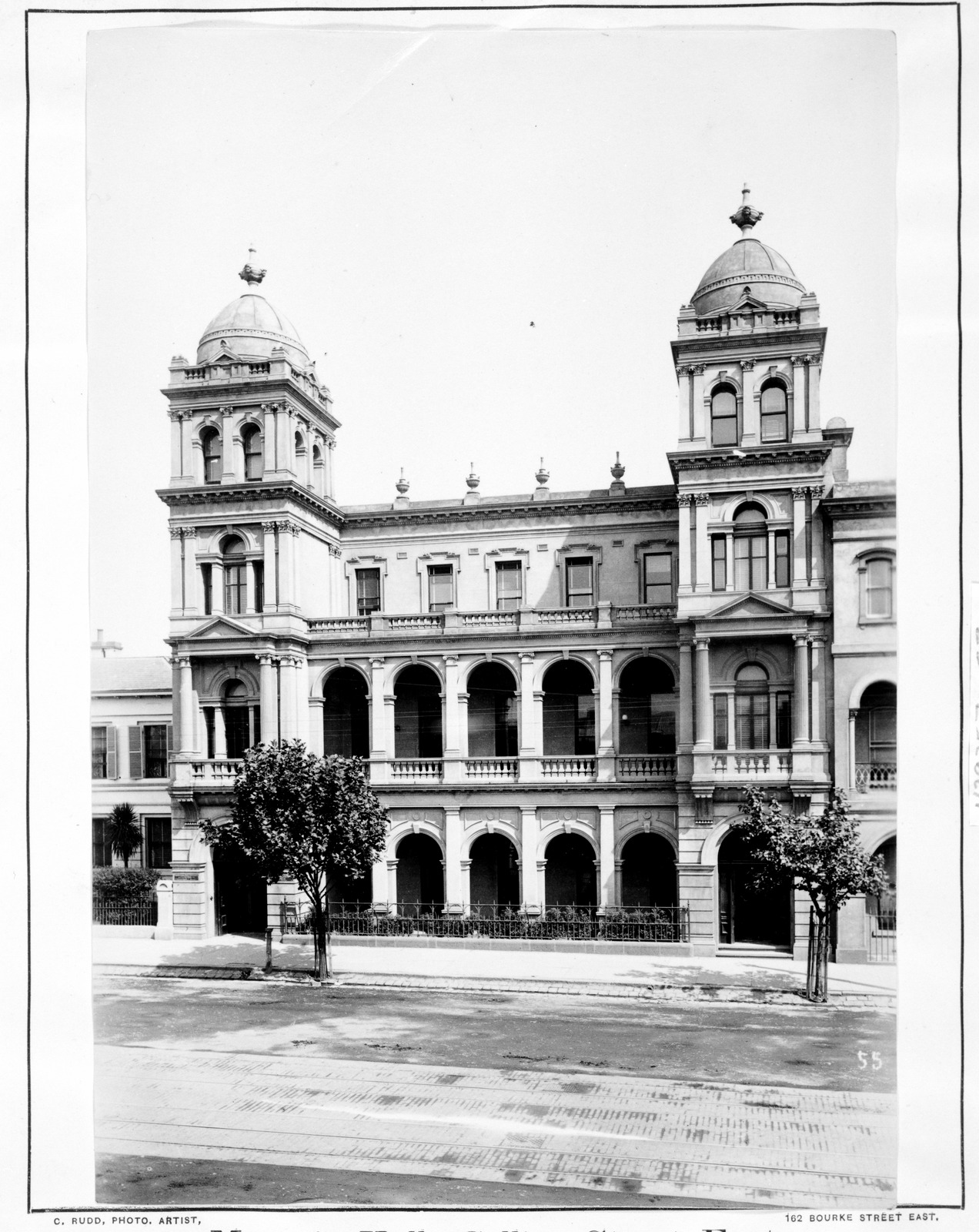
Masonic Hall, Collins Street, Melbuorne, 1887

Robur Tea Building, Southbank, Melbourne 1887 (engineer)

Maryborough School of Arts, Queensland, 1888

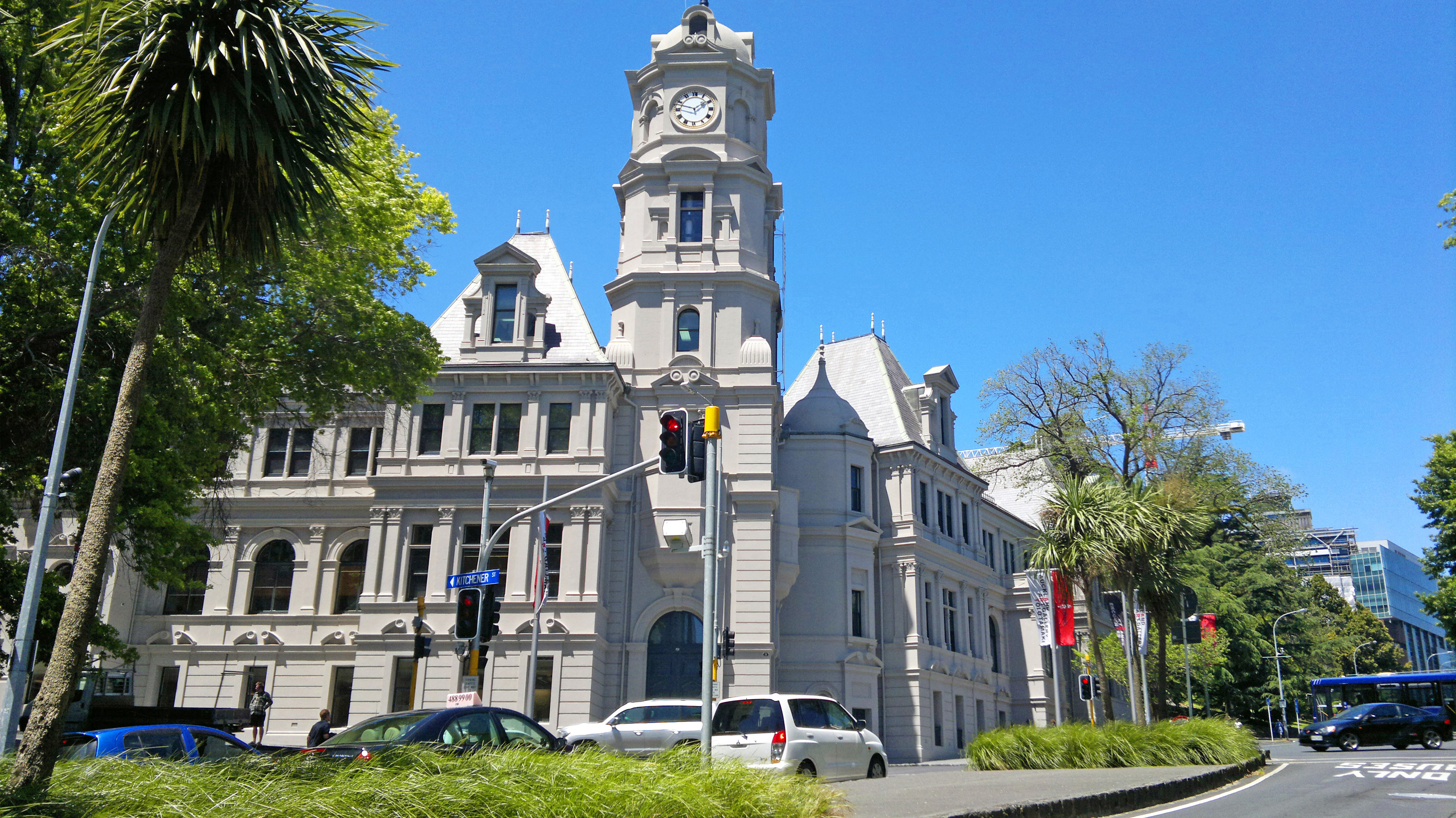
Auckland Town Hall (now Art Gallery), 1888

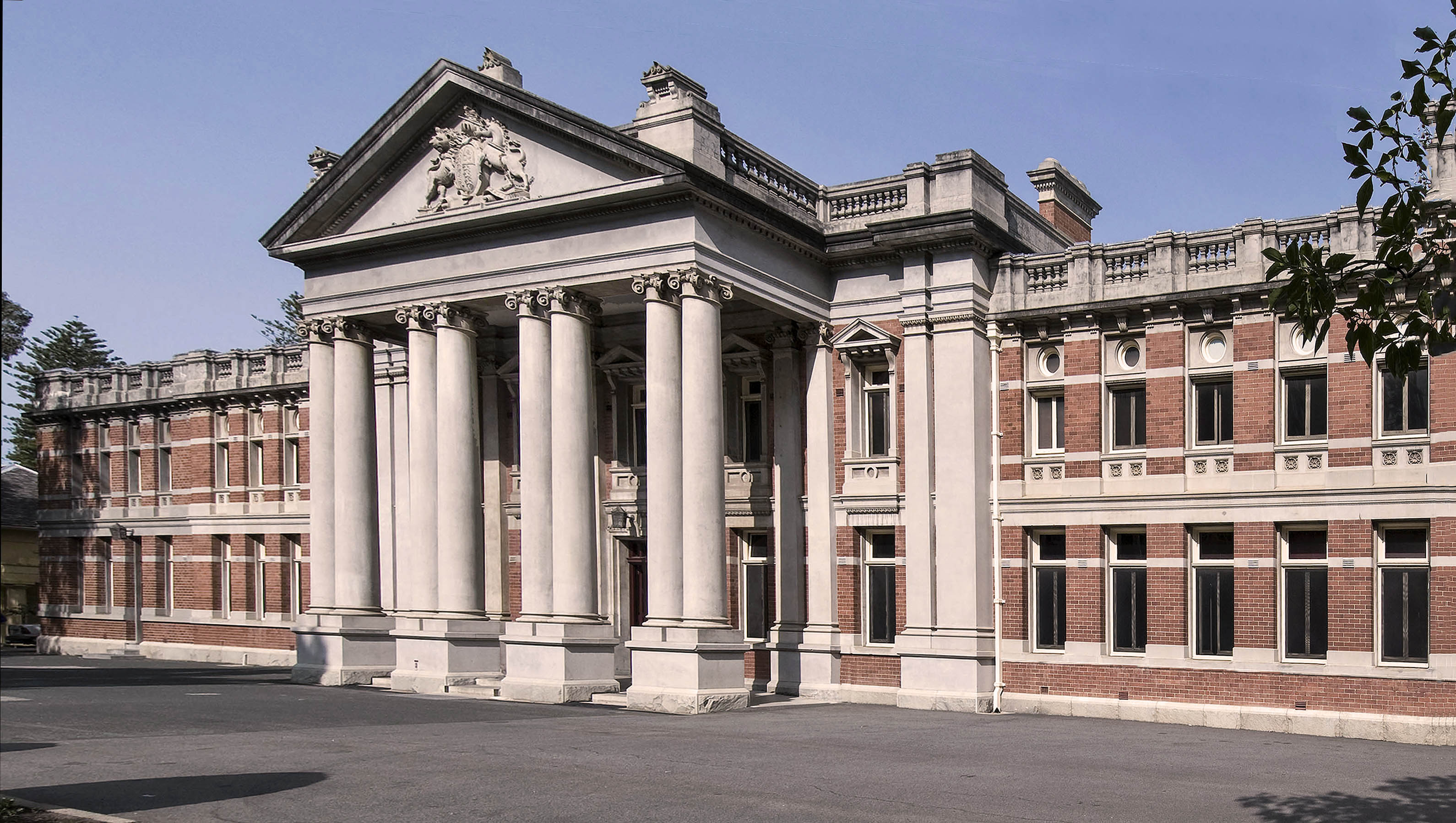
Supreme Court of Western Australia, 1903

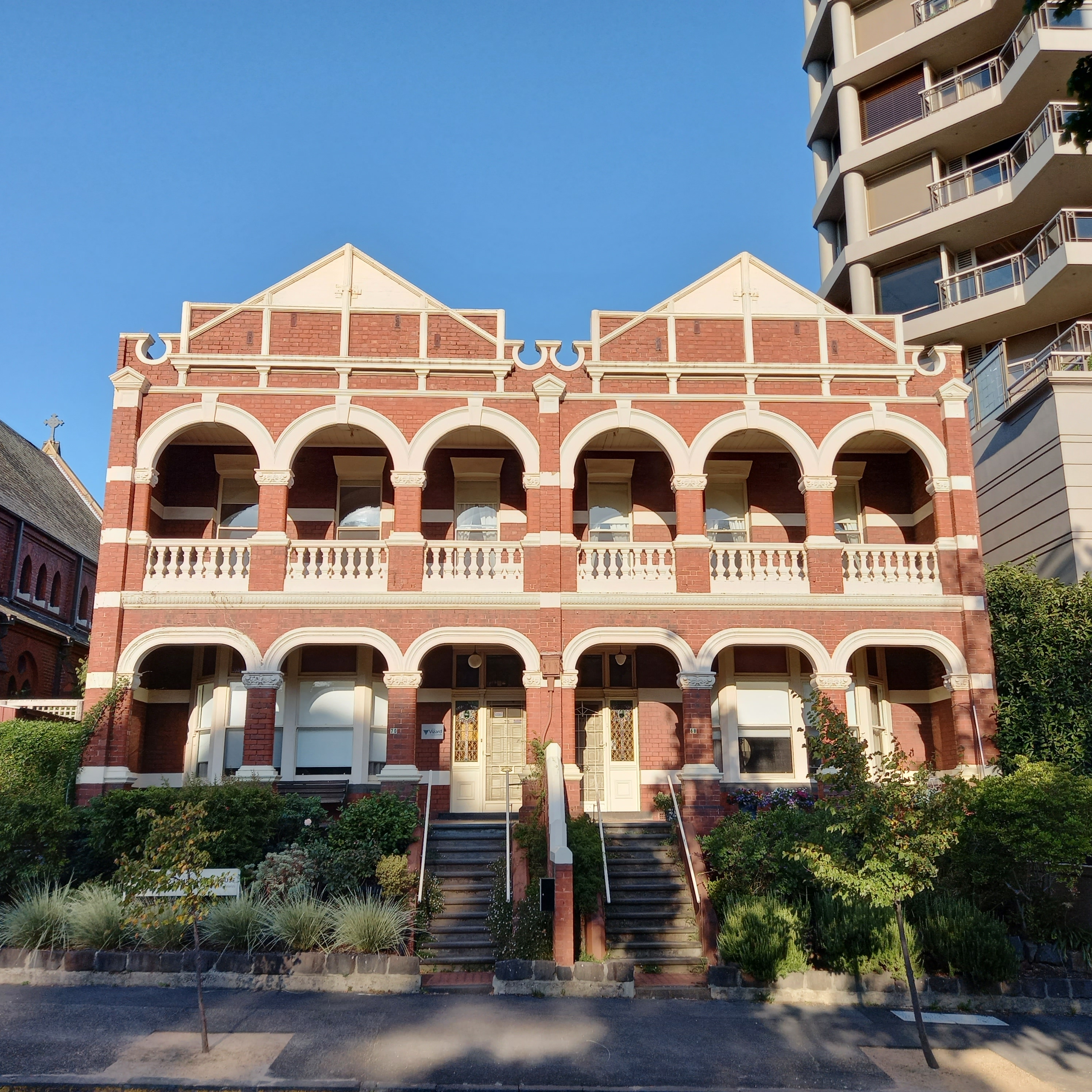
Tereace Pair, East Melbourne, c1908

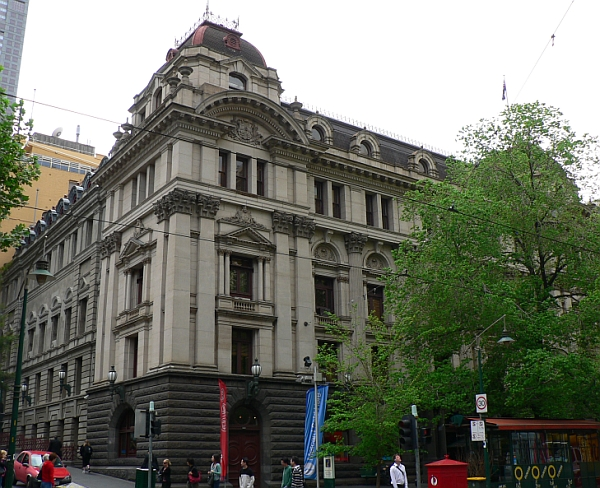
Melbourne Town Hall Administration wing, 1910

== Bridge designs ==
In August 1879, at the age of 24, having already designed Adelaide's Albert Bridge, and while still resident in Adelaide, he entered a partnership in Melbourne (Jenkins and Grainger—sometimes spelt Granger) through which he forwarded designs for two new bridges in Victoria. One was for a new Princes Bridge over the Yarra River in Melbourne, the other a unique swing bridge over the Latrobe River at Sale. These were entirely his own work, both earning him lucrative first prizes and being followed by construction of the prestigious bridges.

He overcame chronic illness to design at least 14 bridges as well as five water supply and irrigation schemes, and a large number of buildings, many of which are on heritage registers in Australia and New Zealand.

Preceded by George Temple-Poole	Principal Architect; Public Works Department; Western Australia; 1897–1905	Succeeded by Hillson Beasley
