= Coombe Cottage =

Heritage-listed house in Melbourne, Victoria, Australia

- Location of the house in Greater Metropolitan Melbourne

General information
- Status: Completed
- Type: House and garden
- Architectural style: Arts and Crafts
- Location: Junction of Melba and Maroondah highways, Coldstream, Yarra Ranges, Melbourne, Victoria, Australia
- Coordinates: 37°43′09″S 145°22′52″E
- Named for: Cottage in Kingston Hill, Surrey, England
- Completed: 1912; 114 years ago
- Renovated: 1926
- Client: Dame Nellie Melba
- Owner: Dame Nellie Melba (1909–1931); Pamela, Lady Vestey (–2011); Samuel Vestey, 3rd Baron Vestey and Mark Vestey (since 2011)

Technical details
- Material: Bricks; slate roof
- Grounds: 31 ha (77 acres)

Design and construction
- Architect: John Harry Grainger (1912)
- Other designers: William Guilfoyle (garden, 1911); Edna Walling
- Known for: Residence of Dame Nellie Melba

Renovating team
- Architect: Walter Richmond Butler (1926)

Website
- coombeyarravalley.com.au

Victorian Heritage Register
- Official name: Coombe Cottage
- Type: Registered place
- Criteria: B, E, H
- Designated: 10 August 2023
- Reference no.: H2443
- Categories: Residential buildings (private); Education

Register of the National Estate
- Type: Defunct register
- Designated: undated
- Reference no.: 100529

Coombe Cottage is a house and garden located at the junction of the Melba and Maroondah highways, in the outer suburb of Coldstream in Melbourne, Australia.

The home of Dame Nellie Melba, she oversaw major renovations in the 1910s. Together with the garden, it was added to the Victorian Heritage Register on 10 August 2023 in recognition of its historical, social, and aesthetic significance; it was also added to non-statutory lists by the Victorian branch of the National Trust on 9 May 1980, the now defunct Register of the National Estate, and to a local government heritage list, that latter two, both on unknown dates.

== History ==
Located on the traditional lands of the Wurundjeri people, the Coombe Cottage site formed part of the Yering pastoral run, purchased in 1850 by Paul Frederic de Castella. De Castella, born in Neuchatel, Switzerland, developed the vineyard commenced by previous owners of Yering and he subsequently became a renowned vigneron (as did his brother, Charles Hubert). In 1852, De Castella relinquished the run and purchased 809 hectares (2,000 acres) freehold that included the land on which Coombe Cottage was later developed. In 1909, a modest residence was located on this site, owned by the Dooley family.

The 31-hectare (77-acre) dairy farm was purchased on 17 November 1909 by Dame Nellie Melba, born Helen Porter Mitchell. The property was named St Leonards from 1904, and prior to that, Cullwin Lodge. Following her purchase, Melba renamed the farm as Coombe Cottage after a house of the same name that she rented at Kingston Hill, Surrey, in England. Melba's son, George, showed an interest in farming; and, for Melba, the outbreak of World War I limited travel and concert opportunities in the northern hemisphere; and she applied herself in Australia to raising funds for war charities.

"They simply had to go in and inspect the house. Nellie gripped by excitement, decided it was a beautiful site. Taking in the house with a glance, she looked across at the beloved blue hills of her childhood. The house, with sixty acres, was bought on the spot. David Mitchell pointed out that there was no water supply and that the hill site caught all the winds, but Nellie maintained that all could be arranged. She set to work to organize everything and soon she had the makings of a house she could live in. She named the house Coombe Cottage."

— Pamela, Lady Vestey, in Melba: A Family Memoir, p.133.

In c. 1910, Melba engaged William Guilfoyle, a landscape gardener and botanist, to design the garden; and she engaged architect, John Harry Grainger, a friend of her father, David Mitchell, to enlarge the existing cottage in the Arts and Crafts style. Melba's son, George, married Evelyn Doyle in 1913 and they made Coombe Cottage their home and it was the principal Australian residence of Melba, until 1931.

Recently appointed a dame, in 1918 Melba invited the Governor-General, Sir Ronald Munro-Ferguson, as a guest and he visited Coombe Cottage and the Cave Hill Limestone Quarry, the latter a large limestone quarry established by her late father in the 1870s.

After WWI, the lodge and the front gate were built in 1926, a copy of an existing lodge in England, designed by Walter Richmond Butler. During the 1920's, Edna Walling managed the garden for Melba and supervised several changes.

The house has remained in Melba's family, gifted to her granddaughter, Pamela, Lady Vestey and, following Lady Vestey's death in 2011, to her United Kingdom-based sons, Samuel, the 3rd Baron and Mark.

== Description ==
=== Cottage ===
The site comprises a main house, a garden with numerous landscape features, multiple outbuildings, an avenue of elms, and historical objects of interest. Purchased as a rural retreat, the place reflects Melba's aesthetic tastes and enjoyment of a country lifestyle away from her concert touring schedule. Melba is understood to have directed the design of the house in 1911 and 1926, as well as the development of its decorative schemes, collection of objects, and garden over twenty years after acquiring the property in 1909.

Coombe Cottage is a rare as an unusually intact private residence with a collection of objects. The place and its collection largely retained its layout from the late 1920s, including fixtures and fittings, decorative schemes, and examples of hand-painted wallpaper. The place remains unusually intact due to the ownership and care of Melba's granddaughter, Pamela, Lady Vestey, over a number of decades, and of other members of the Vestey family. The collection of architecturally distinctive buildings are all major elements in the garden design, including the residence (and especially its rooftop pergola), entry lodge, garage and stables, pool changing rooms and summer house.

=== Garden ===
The compartmentalised garden was developed progressively and with input from Melba, Guilfoyle, and Walling. Major features of the garden include the encircling hedge, gates and gate lodge, the residence and associated drives, paths, lawns and shrubberies, mature trees, perennial walk, rose garden, vegetable garden, pool, associated buildings, including gates, pergolas, a sundial, and a pair of stag sculptures. The gardens include an immaculately-maintained hedge, roses, exotic trees such as Italian cypresses, and the avenue of oaks along the rear drive. There is contrast within the garden, provided by different compartments, some totally screened and others more open, controlled vistas both into and out of the garden, mature trees, and the tradition of the perennial walk.

== See also ==
- Architecture of Melbourne
- List of gardens in Victoria
- List of places on the Victorian Heritage Register in the Shire of Yarra Ranges
