= Cave Hill Limestone Quarry =

Heritage-listed former quarry in Melbourne, Victoria, Australia

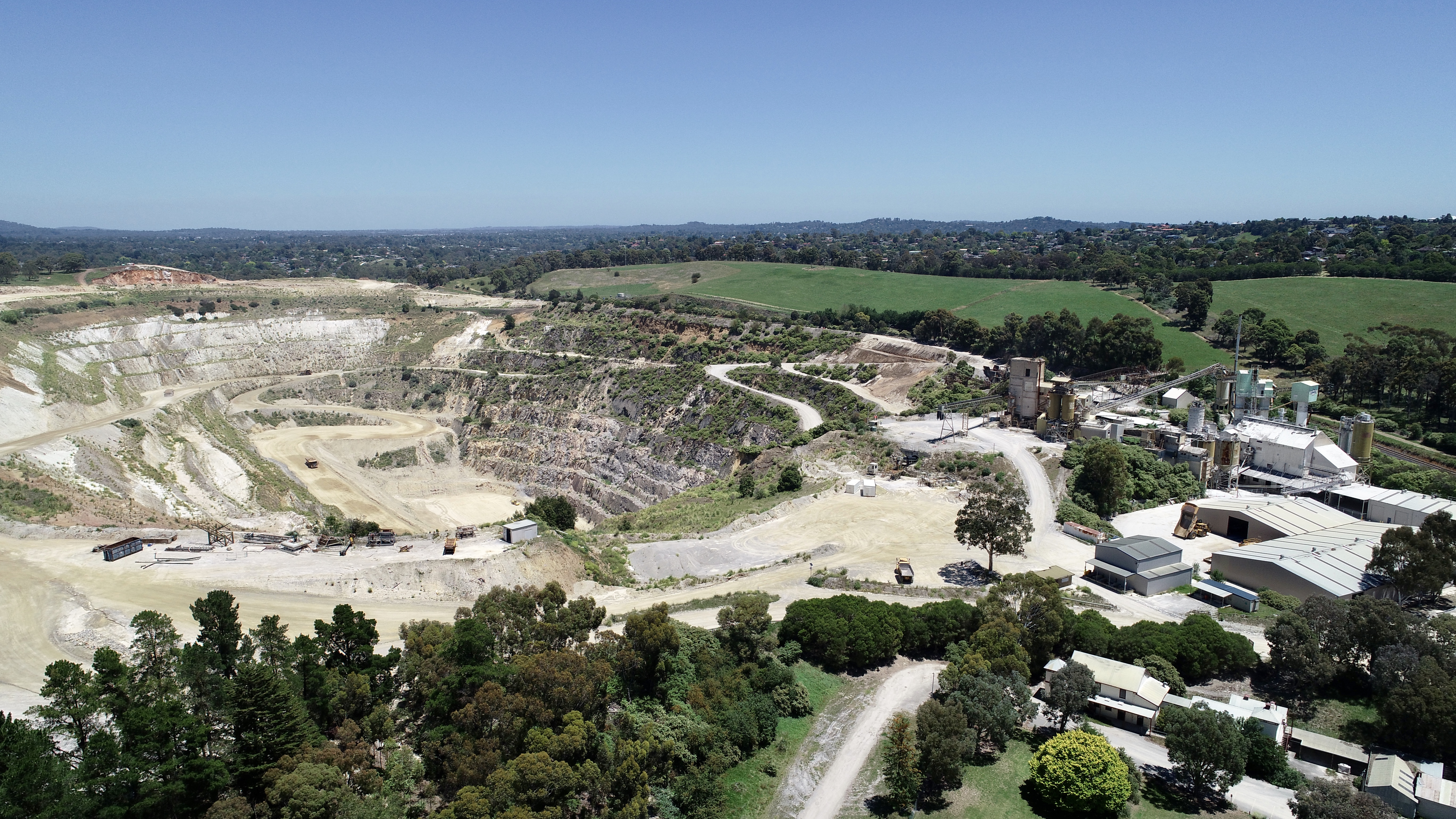
- The former quarry site, in 2018, with manufacturing plant (upper right)

- Location of the quarry in Greater Metropolitan Melbourne
- 37°46′03″S 145°20′20″E
- Type: Limestone quarry (1878–2015); Residential housing estate
- Location: 4 Melba Avenue, Lilydale, Yarra Ranges, Melbourne, Victoria, Australia

History
- Founder: David Mitchell
- Built: from 1878
- Abandoned: 2015

Site notes
- Owner: David Mitchell (1878–1916); David Mitchell Estate (1916–2002); Unimin Australia (2002–2015); Intrapac Property (since c. 2015)

Victorian Heritage Register
- Official name: Cave Hill Limestone Quarry
- Type: Registered place
- Criteria: A, B, D, F, H
- Designated: 8 June 2017
- Reference no.: H2366
- Heritage overlay no.: HO201
- Categories: Farming and Grazing; Mining and Mineral Processing

The Cave Hill Limestone Quarry is a former limestone quary and former processing plant, now a residential housing estate, located at 4 Melba Avenue in Lilydale, in the Yarra Ranges, in the north eastern suburbs of Melbourne, in Victoria, Australia. The quarry operated from 1878 until 2015, when it was closed. Some of the site was subsequently redeveloped as the Kinley housing estate, and other parts flowed as the Lillydale Lake and its associated wetlands and Lillydale Park.

Built on the traditional lands of the Wurundjeri people, the former quarry was added to the Victorian Heritage Register on 8 June 2017 in recognition of its historical and technical significance.

== History ==
During the nineteenth century the production of lime mortars and plasters were integral to construction. From 1836, lime burning activities were concentrated on the Mornington Peninsula and at Geelong, often in small local lime kilns, such as those at Point Nepean, Sorrento, Rye, Queenscliff, and Point Lonsdale.

The Cave Hill Limestone Quarry represents the second stage of the lime industry development in Victoria, characterised by access to rail transport and management by larger companies. David Mitchell was a Scottish-born stonemason and building contractor who was a prominent figure in Victorian society, and also the father of Dame Nellie Melba. Mitchell's building projects included the Scots' Church (1874), St Patrick's Cathedral (1874), Presbyterian Ladies' College (1874), the Royal Exhibition Building (1880), and other structures. A successful entrepreneur, he was involved in many business ventures. Mitchell established the Cave Hill site that was formally opened in a grand ceremony on 2 April 1878.

"The opening of the marble and limestone quarries at Cave-hill Farm, near Lilydale was celebrated by a luncheon given by Mr David Mitchell yesterday. About 30 gentlemen left Melbourne early yesterday morning for the quarries, in three well-appointed coaches. Among them was his worship the Mayor of Melbourne, several councillors, and many of the leading contractors in the city. The quarries are most peculiarly situated. The stone crops out all up the sides of a steep hill, at the foot of which there is a natural shaft extending about 30 m (100 ft) deep, and opening out into large caverns. The whole of the hill to the bottom of these caverns is composed of true crystalline limestone of the finest quality. The analysis made by Mr. William Johnson, the Government analytical chemist, shows that it is composed of 95 per cent of carbonate of lime, 4 per cent of clay and magnesia, and 1 per cent of water. A small portion of the hill had been cleared and the stone burned, which was slacked before the company. Tho lime was pronounccd by the contractors present to be of the finest quality; and as the body of stone is almost inexhaustible, the discovery is on of the greatest importance to the colony. After inspecting the quarries, the company to the number of 60 persons, adjourned for lunch, which was furnished by Messrs Clements and Phipps, of Swanston Street. The chair was occupied by Mr. David Mitchell, the proprietor of the property. Besides the Melbourne visitors, there were present several councillors of the Shire of Lilydale and residents in the district. After the usual loyal toasts, his worship the Mayor of Melbourne gave the health of Mr. David Mitchell, and congratulated the district upon possessing such an enterprising resident. The toast was drunk with great enthusiasm. After luncheon, a coursing party was got up but only a couple of courses were obtained hares being wild and scarce. The company reached town shortly after 8 o'clock, greatly pleased with their excursion, and much impressed with the importance of the limestone deposits at Cave-hill Farm. It is the opinion of the contractors that when the Upper Yarra railway is constructed this property alone could supply all the lime required by Melbourne."

— The Argus, 3 April 1878.

Mitchell invested in infrastructure such as steam powered cranes, a network of tramlines to transport timber, and a battery of pot kilns that enabled round-the-clock lime burning, despite the limitations of the intermittent technology. During blasting in 1897, silver ore was claimed to be found in the quarry.

Mitchell had earlier established a large-scale farm at the site, which operated from the 1880s to c. 1921. By 1894, dairy and meat-processing 'factories' were established on the farm.

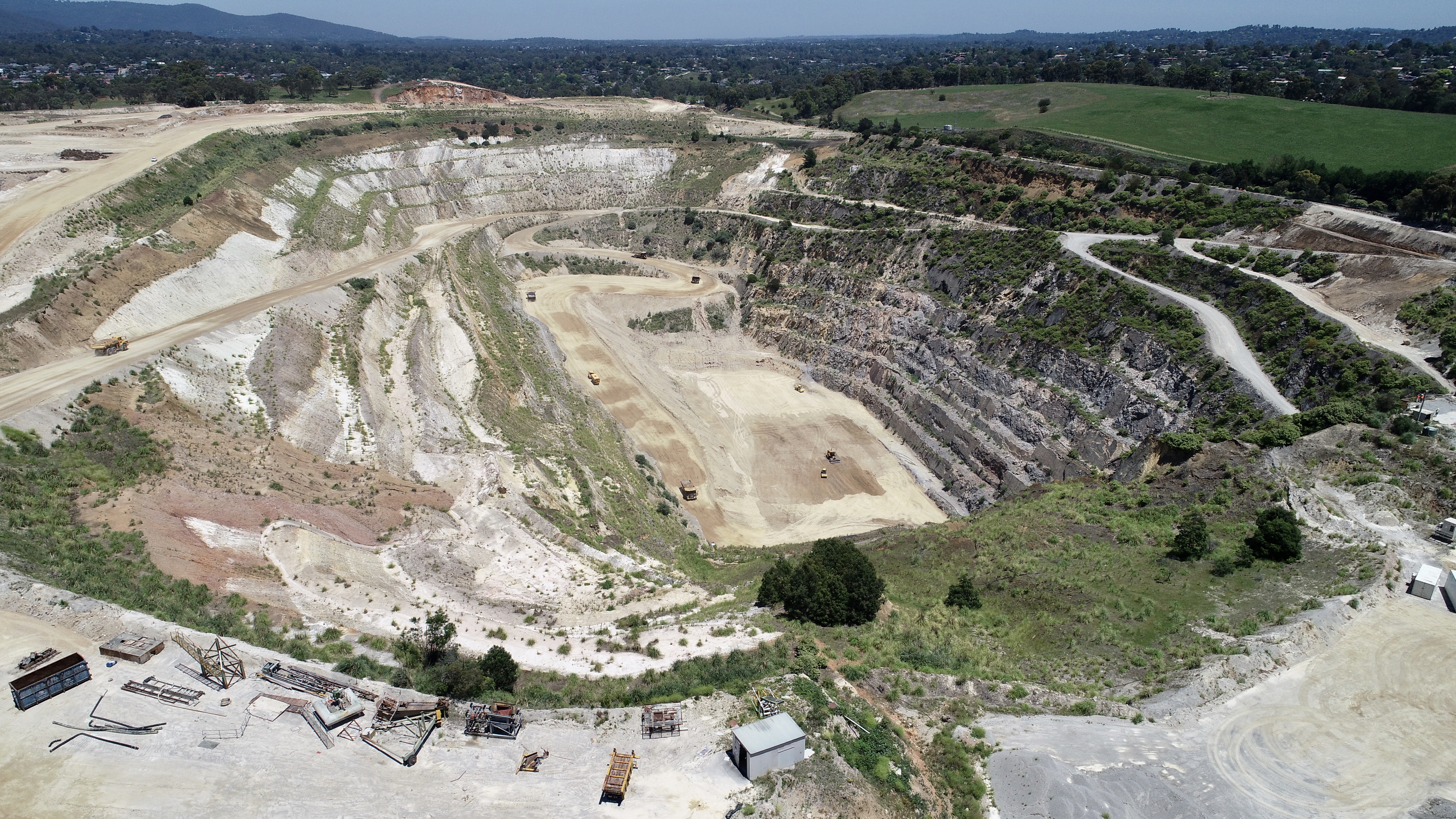
The former quarry in 2018

In 1916, following Mitchell's death, the ownership of Cave Hill passed to the David Mitchell Estate Trust. In 1918, the Governor-General, Sir Ronald Munro-Ferguson, as a guest of Dame Nellie Melba, visited the site and Coombe Cottage – Melba's home from c. 1911 to 1931. During the 1920s the plant and equipment continued to be remodelled and mechanised, and Cave Hill Limestone Quarry became one of the leading industrial plants in Australia, with average output at 23,000 tonnes (25,000 short tons) of lime per annum during the mid-1920s; and the mine surface was dug to a depth of 61 metres (200 ft) below ground level. In June 1958 the business passed to a company, David Mitchell Estate Limited. The eastern two-thirds of the property were excised from the quarry site. Much of this land was subdivided into housing estates, and the Lilydale Lake was created in the 1990s, later expanded with wetlands and an urban park.

In November 2002, Unimin Australia, a subsidiary of mining multi-national SCR-Sibelco, a company privately-owned by the Belgian Emsens family, purchased David Mitchell Estate Limited, ending the Mitchell family association. In 2012, Unimin Australia determined that the quarry was not viable in the long term and closed the quarry in 2015. Part of the manufacturing plant area was redeveloped as a housing estate called Kinley, by Intrapac Property.

== Description ==
The Cave Hill Limestone Quarry is located approximately 1km south-west of Lilydale town centre. It includes a quarry pit, the limestone processing area and a former mixed farm. The place retains a wide diversity of industrial and farm buildings, plant and elements dating from the late-1870s through to the early and latter twentieth century. The lime processing precinct includes multiple layers of infrastructure and plant dating from the late nineteenth century, and in some cases the operational relationships between significant elements is obscured. Significant topographical change occurred at the site between 1878 and 2015 relating to extraction and processing of lime.

Cave Hill Limestone Quarry including the quarry pit, structures and plant for processing limestone and the production of lime-based products dating to the 1880s (tunnel and battery of pot kilns) and 1920s (no. 1 kiln, picking station, incline hoist, road metal plant and riveted steel hopper), rail siding and section of rail platform, remnants of the late-nineteenth century Cave Hill farm, specifically the dairy and bacon factories and silage store; eastern driveway; and the World War II memorial stone gateposts, erected sometime after 1945 and believed to be a memorial to the 73 employees of the quarry who enlisted.

== See also ==
- List of manufacturing plants in Melbourne
- List of places on the Victorian Heritage Register in the Shire of Yarra Ranges
