= Lillydale Lake =

Recreational lake in Victoria, Australia

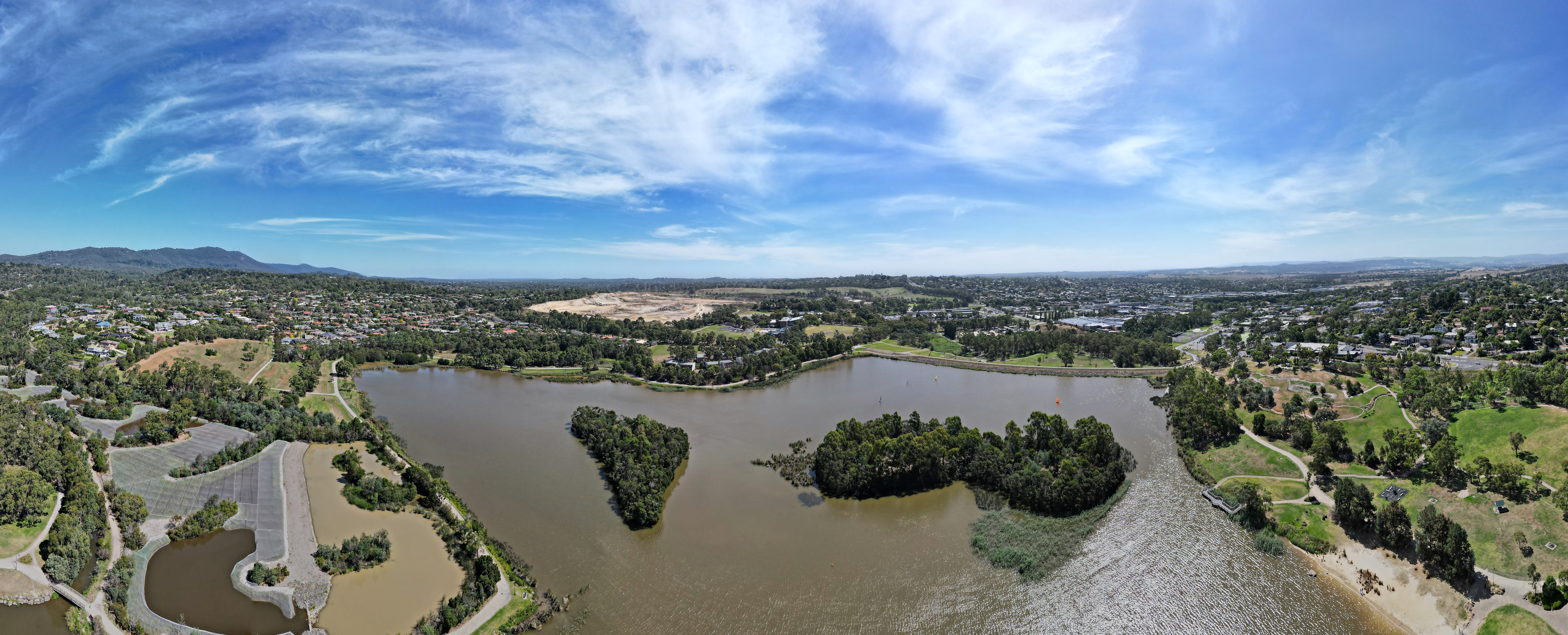
- An aerial view of the constructed wetlands, 2023

- Location of the recreational lake in Greater Metropolitan Melbourne
- Interactive map of Lillydale Lake
- Country: Australia
- Location: Lilydale, Melbourne, Victoria
- Coordinates: 37°45′57″S 145°21′11″E
- Purpose: Flood mitigation; Recreation
- Status: Operational
- Construction began: 1988
- Opening date: 1990
- Built by: Melbourne and Metropolitan Board of Works
- Operator: Melbourne Water

Dam and spillways
- Type of dam: Earth fill dam
- Impounds: Olinda Creek
- Length: 440 m (1,440 ft)

Reservoir
- Surface area: 28 ha (69 acres)
- Maximum water depth: 3 m (9.8 ft)

Lillydale Lake Park
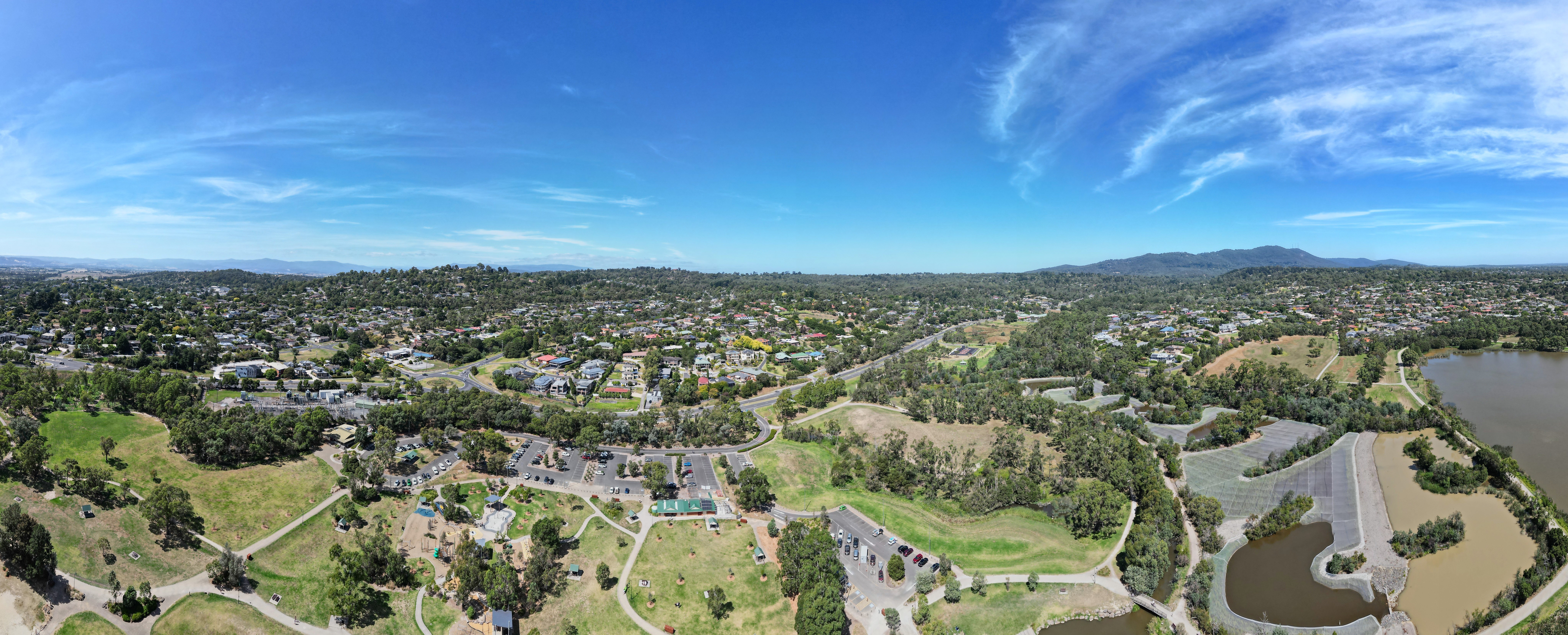
- An aerial view of the parkland and playgrounds
- Type: Urban park
- Location: Swansea Road, Lilydale
- Nearest city: Melbourne
- Coordinates: 37°45′56″S 145°21′24″E
- Area: 100 ha (250 acres)
- Opened: 7 July 1990
- Operator: Yarra Ranges Council
- Visitors: c. 1 million (in 2023)
- Status: Open

The Lillydale Lake (Note: The name "Lillydale" is the earliest colonial spelling of the location and was named after the former Shire of Lillydale; not the town of "Lilydale".) is a reservoir, artificial lake, and constructed wetlands created by an earth-filled embankment dam across the Olinda Creek, located in Lilydale, approximately 40 kilometres (25 mi) to the east of the Melbourne central business district, in Victoria, Australia. Following flooding of the Yarra Valley in 1984, the 28-hectare (69-acre) reservoir was created in 1990 to assist with flood mitigation.

Surrounding the reservoir is the Lillydale Lake Park, a 100-hectare (250-acre) urban park with extensive recreational facilities.

The reservoir and wetlands are managed by Melbourne Water and the park is managed by the Yarra Ranges Council since 1990.

== Overview ==
Since settlement in the 19th century, low-lying areas of Lilydale were susceptible to flooding from the Olinda Creek. In 1969, the local council proposed a 65-hectare (160-acre) urban park, followed by several more proposals. However, due to a lack of funds, the proposals did not proceed. Following floods of the Yarra Valley in September 1984, construction of the lake was proposed to prevent future flooding and provide recreational facilities.

The 440-metre-long (1,440 ft) earth-filled dam wall was built between 1988 and 1990 and created a resultant 28-hectare (69-acre) reservoir. The ruins of the 1850s Cashin's flour mill are situated at the northern end of the dam wall.

The 100-hectare (250-acre) urban park was officially opened to the public on 7 July 1990. There are over 10 kilometres (6.2 mi) of shared trails, a community room and meeting facilities, a monster playground, toilets, barbecues and a picnic area. A boat launching ramp provides for non-powered boating. There are also two off-leash dog exercise areas.

== Gallery ==
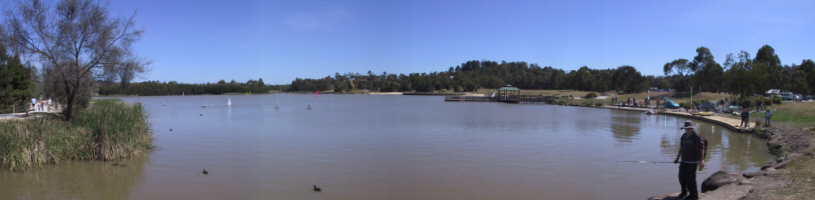
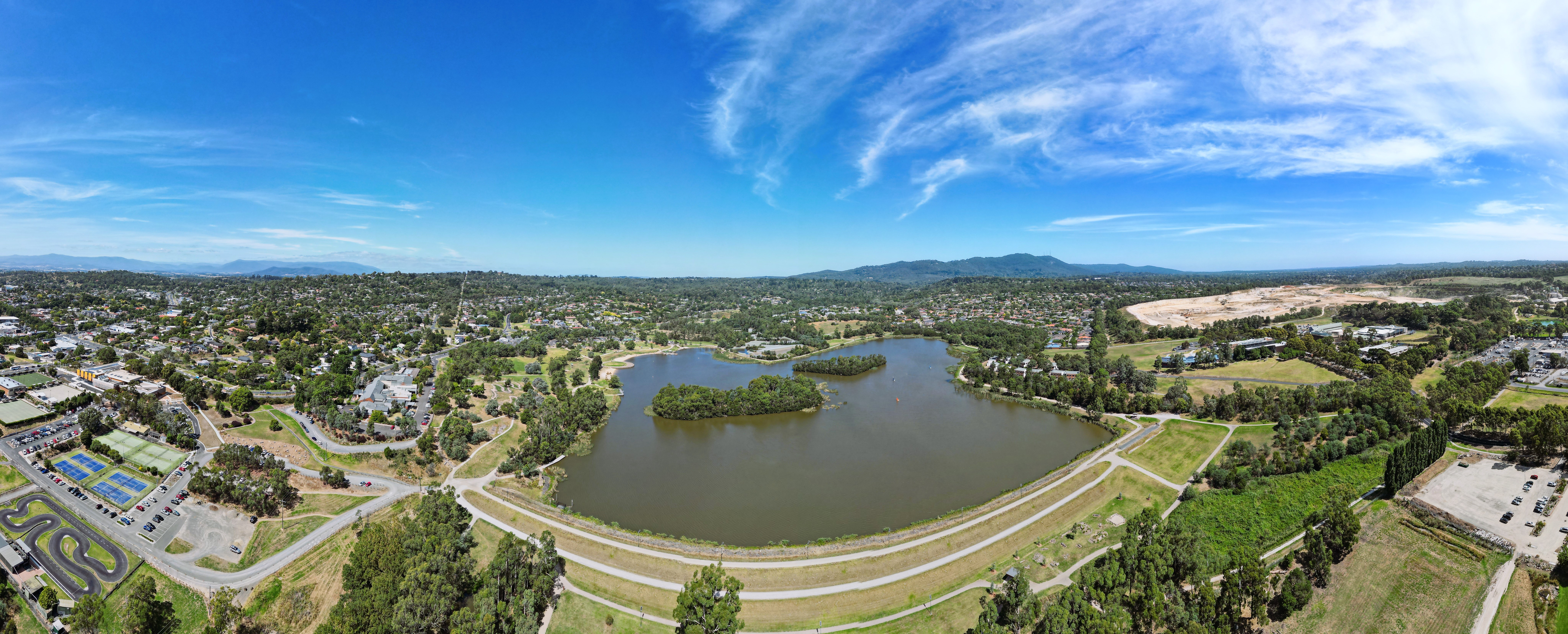
Wide view of the reservoir, 2023

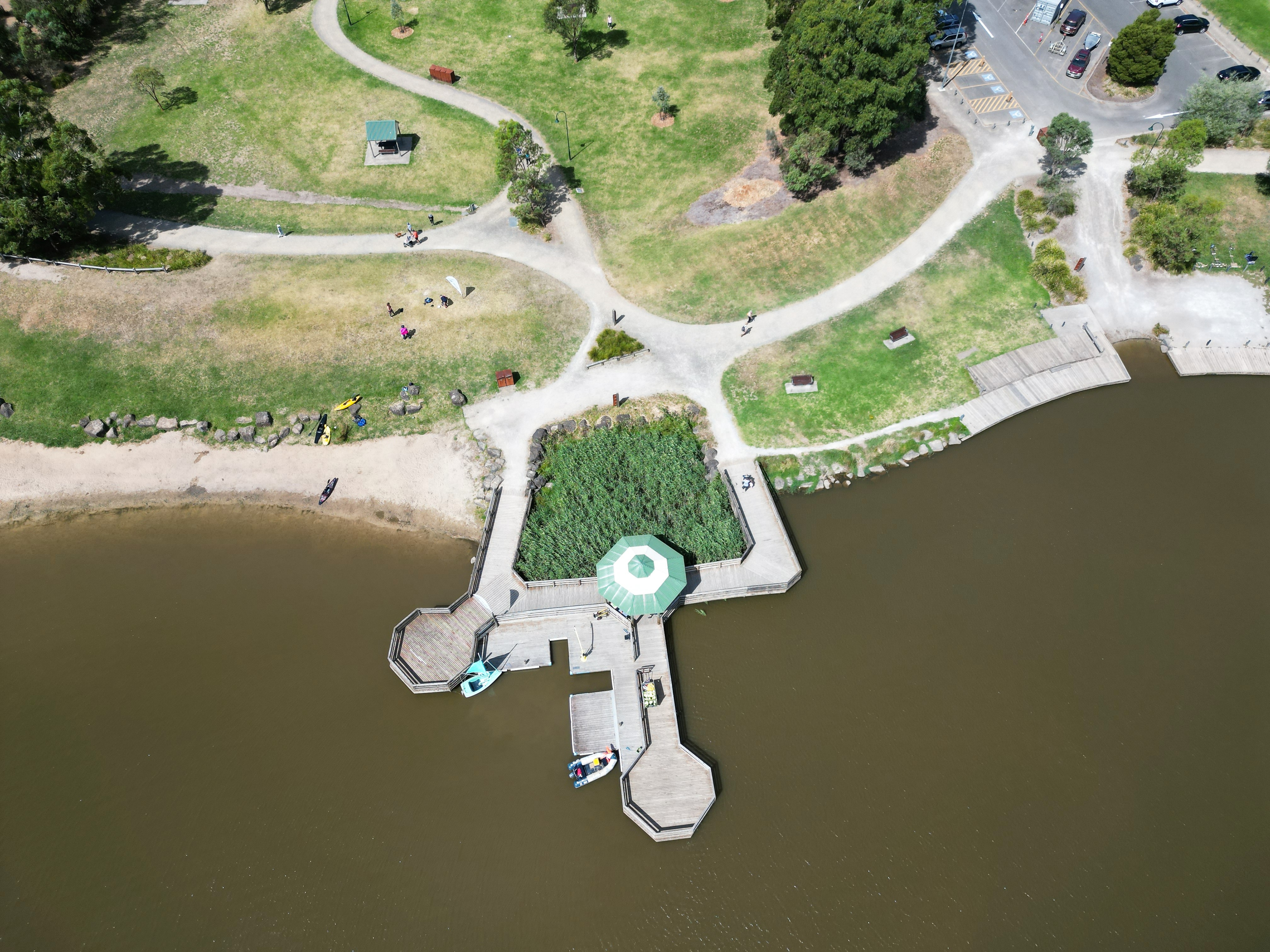
A pier

== See also ==
- Cave Hill Limestone Quarry
- List of reservoirs and dams in Victoria
- List of parks and gardens in Melbourne
