= Sale Swing Bridge =

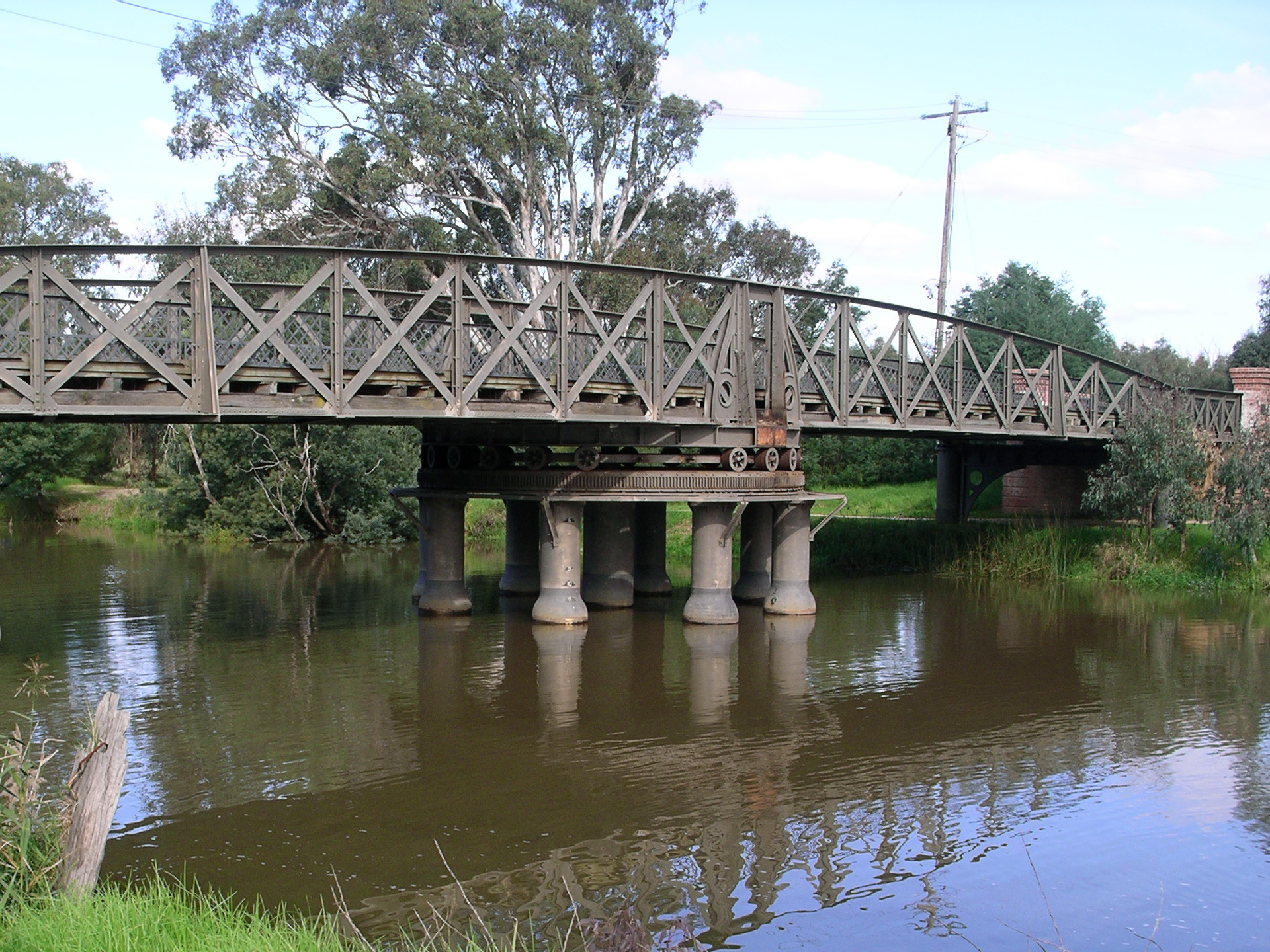
- Sale swing bridge, in closed position
- Coordinates: 38°08′47″S 147°05′13″E
- Carries: Swing Bridge Drive, formerly South Gippsland Highway, formerly Port Albert Road
- Crosses: Latrobe River
- Locale: Gippsland, Victoria, Australia
- Official name: Sale Swing Bridge
- Other name: La Trobe Bridge (former name)

Characteristics
- Design: Swing bridge
- Material: Wrought iron spans, timber deck, concrete-filled cast iron piers
- Total length: 45.6m (swinging section)
- Width: 6.7m (22 feet)

History
- Designer: John Grainger
- Constructed by: Peter Platt
- Fabrication by: Castings by Messers Johnson & Company of Tyne Foundry, Melbourne
- Construction start: 1880
- Construction end: 1883
- Opened: 1883

Location
- Interactive map of Sale Swing Bridge

The Sale Swing Bridge is located on Swing Bridge Drive near the South Gippsland Highway, Longford, 5 km south of the city of Sale, Victoria, Australia and spans the Latrobe River at its junction with the Thomson River.

The bridge was constructed from 1880 to 1883 and designed to be operated by a two-person hand cranking system. Currently, it is opened using a trailer-mounted hydraulic power unit.

As at 2023, the bridge opens each Saturday and Sunday between 3pm and 4pm, and on the second Wednesday of every month between 11am and 12 noon.

== Operation ==
The bridge can swing in either direction, swinging 90 degrees to allow the passage of river traffic. It was designed to be opened by a hand-powered cranking system, which required two people to operate. When opening, the first operation is to use a hand crank inserted through an aperture in the deck of the bridge to lower two friction roller wheels, located in the centre of the roadway at both ends of the moving section, onto a curved iron roller path. Screw jacks at the corners of the swinging section are retracted to lower the bridge ends onto the friction roller wheels, via a crank inserted into a shaft at each corner of the bridge.

Rotation of the moving section was achieved via two gear train mechanisms at the centre of the bridge, one on each side. These had two gear speed ratios selected by a dog clutch. Since 2004, although the hand cranking system has been retained, the bridge has been powered by a portable trailer-mounted hydraulic motor and power pack.

== History ==
=== Early history ===
Designed by John Grainger (father of Australian composer Percy Grainger), and built by local contractor Peter Platt for the Victorian Government Board of Land and Works it was the first movable bridge built in Victoria. Its wrought-iron structure, 45 metres long, pivots on a set of nine cylindrical cast iron columns filled with concrete. Before opening, it was test loaded with 240 cattle.

Sale Swing Bridge design drawing 1 by John Harry Grainger

Sale Swing Bridge design drawing 2 by John Harry Grainger "La Trobe Bridge, Sale, drawing no. 2, 1879"

The bridge was operated by a series of bridgekeepers until 1938, the last time the bridge was opened regularly. At its peak, the bridge was opened up to 20 times a day, allowing the movement of steamers between Sale and Melbourne. Between 1938 and 2004 it was only opened on three occasions. In 1953, a dredge needed to pass upstream to remove a tree which blocked river traffic. In 1963, it opened to allow the Tambo Lady to pass for the Municipality of Sale's centenary celebrations. The third time was in 1972 due to a request by the Traralgon and District Historical Society.

While no major modifications to the bridge have occurred throughout its history, a number of maintenance operations have occurred.

- In 1893, wider rollers in the central pivot mechanism were installed.
- In 1902-03, the winch was rebuilt and new bearer plates were installed.
- In 1925, 1933, 1953 and 1982 the bridge roadway timbers were re-decked.
- In 1980, traffic lights were installed.
- In 1982 all the metal was sand-blasted and repainted.

=== 2004 Restoration Works ===
By the late 20th century, increased traffic requirements, included traffic for the off-shore oil and gas industry, resulted in the need for a new section of the A440 South Gippsland Highway, with new high level concrete bridges, crossing both the Thompson and Latrobe rivers slightly upstream of the swing bridge. The new Thompson River bridge gives 6.5m clearance for watercraft passing to and from the Port of Sale.

Upon completion of the new A440 bypass, VicRoads commenced major restoration works on the swing bridge, beginning towards the end of 2003, and completed by the start of 2006. The northern abutment had moved over the years towards the river, causing the bridge to be jammed for many years. This abutment had to be completely rebuilt.

Due to repeated traffic damage, the original criss-cross iron balustrade sections had been removed years beforehand. Amazingly, these were located in a VicRoads depot in Morwell. These were repaired or replaced by contractor Jarvis Norwood. Also repaired or replaced were the mechanical components of the bridge opening mechanism. A trailer mounted portable hydraulic power unit was constructed to enable the bridge to operate under power. Other minor repairs, such as re-decking and painting were also conducted. Upon completion of refurbishment, the bridge was swung by hand by Ann Synan, great-great-granddaughter of gatekeeper Eliza Ball.

=== Recent History ===
Since the restoration about 2,500 tourists have visited the bridge each year.

The Sale Swing Bridge was used as a set in 2007 for the filming of the 2008 film The Tender Hook, starring Hugo Weaving and Rose Byrne.

In April 2017 vandals lodged a block of wood in the gear mechanism, causing an axle to bend and the bottom roller beam to crack. The bridge was re-opened in July 2017 after a $160,000 repair.

== List of Bridgekeepers ==
- George Bailey 1884-1886
- James Flint 1886
- John Towner 1888-1891
- Eliza Ball 1891-1893
- John Towner 1893-1912
- Tom Kivlighon 1912-1938

== Engineering heritage award ==
The bridge is listed as an Engineering Heritage National Landmark by Engineers Australia as part of its Engineering Heritage Recognition Program.
