= Kamesburgh =

Heritage-listed mansion, now school campus, in Melbourne, Victoria, Australia

- The mansion in 2007

- Location of the mansion in Greater Metropolitan Melbourne
- Alternative names: Anzac Hostel; ANZAC Campus, Star of the Sea College

General information
- Status: Completed
- Type: Mansion (1874–1918); Hostel for veterans (1919–1995); School (since 1997– )
- Architectural style: Victorian Italianate
- Location: 74–104 North Road, Brighton, City of Bayside, Melbourne, Victoria, Australia
- Coordinates: 37°53′57″S 144°59′52″E
- Current tenants: Star of the Sea College
- Completed: 1874; 152 years ago
- Client: William Kerr Thomson

Technical details
- Material: Rendered bricks; wrought iron; bluestone; slate

Design and construction
- Architect: Lloyd Tayler
- Main contractor: David Mitchell

Victorian Heritage Register
- Official name: Kamesburgh
- Type: Registered place
- Designated: 11 April 1996
- Reference no.: H1186
- Heritage overlay no.: HO307
- Categories: Residential buildings (private); Education

Register of the National Estate
- Official name: Kamesburgh and Grounds
- Type: Defunct register
- Designated: 30 June 1992
- Reference no.: 14006

Kamesburgh, also known as Anzac Hostel, is a former mansion, then hostel, now school, located at 74–104 North Road in Brighton, in the City of Bayside, in the south eastern suburbs of Melbourne, in Victoria, Australia. Built as a mansion, the building was repurposed as a hostel for war veterans after World War I until 1995; and then repurposed as a school campus, in 1997. It remains one of the largest mansions in Melbourne, and one of the very few retaining extensive grounds.

Built from 1874 on the traditional lands of the Bunurong people, the mansion was added to the Victorian Heritage Register on 11 April 1996 in recognition of its architectural, historical, and social importance; and was also added to non-statutory lists by the Victorian branch of the National Trust on 13 November 1958 and the now defunct Register of the National Estate on 30 June 1992.

== History ==
William Kerr Thomson (Note: Sometimes incorrectly spelled as "Thompson".) was a merchant and managing director of James McEwan and Company who purchased the land on which Kamesburgh stands in 1872. Two years later he had the residence constructed. Architect for the project was prominent Victorian designer Lloyd Tayler, and the builder was David Mitchell. The gardens were established late in 1874. Thomson left Kamesburgh in 1887 and in 1892 the property was bought by Duncan McBryde, a director of BHP from 1885 until his death in 1920 and a member of the Victorian Legislative Council.

In November 1918, McBryde sold Kamesburgh to the Repatriation Department for £17,000 – funded by a gift of £25,000 from William Baillieu and his brothers – renamed as the Anzac Hostel, used for the care of returned servicemen. The Repatriation Department also constructed an occupational therapy building – the day centre – and a mortuary. Upon the building's acquisition by Repatriation following World War I, first floor extensions at the rear were undertaken in 1919, as was the introduction of a lift. After the essential building modifications, the Red Cross, along with the nursing staff, undertook the cleaning of the building and preparations for receiving patients. The Anzac Hostel was officially opened by Sir Arthur Stanley, the Governor of Victoria, on 6 July 1919, and it had a capacity of twenty-five beds and employed seven nurses under the charge of Matron Catherine Munro.

On 5 June 1920, Edward, the Prince of Wales, visited the hostel in Brighton to thank the wounded soldiers for their efforts during WWI; with another royal visit, by Prince Albert, the Duke and Princess Elizabeth, the Duchess of York in 1927.

The conservatory was converted into a sunroom in 1943 and a fire escape ramp was built in 1957.

The Australian Red Cross Society continued to contribute medical comforts and amenities to the hostel until it officially closed on 30 June 1995. The building was leased to the Star of the Sea College, an independent, Catholic, day school for girls, for use as their Year 9 campus since 1997. A new Anzac Hostel was built on the original property's grounds and was officially opened on 27 July 1998.

== Description ==
Kamesburgh is a large two-storey, rendered brick, Victorian Italianate mansion set in an extensive formal garden. The mansion has two three-level towers, the principal tower having a balustraded viewing platform. The entire building is rendered with considerable ornamentation. A two-storey verandah extends around three elevations overlooking the landscaped grounds and terrace. The verandah columns are rendered in the Tuscan and Ionic orders and have been laid out with symmetrical projecting bays facing west. The main entrance is at the base of the tower and is guarded by two cast iron figures (formerly supporting lamps) presented to original owner W. K. Thomson by Messrs Thomas Webb and Sons. Decorative elements include vermiculated quoins, balconettes, stained glass windows, decorated parapets with urns and encaustic tiles to the verandah and entrance halls.

The internal decorative scheme which is now almost totally covered by later layers of paint was the work of the Paterson brothers. Inside, the main halls intersect at four free standing columns, with pilasters. The main stair is decorated with cast iron balustrade panels.

There is a gate house, probably built in 1874, beside the formal entrance gateway and a long wrought iron and bluestone fence on North Road. The gatehouse is a cement-rendered asymmetrical structure with fluted cast iron Corinthian columns supporting a timber bressumer, forming a verandah. The slate roof has ridge cresting. The main gate is nearby as are two mature Moreton Bay fig trees. The cast iron railing on North Road is also of note. The stables/coach house is built of brick on a bluestone plinth and has a gabled slate roof and parapeted ends. The roof is surmounted by a weather vane with a fox symbol. The southern half of the stables were demolished in the 1920s.

Kamesburgh's grounds contain extensive mature plantings which greatly add to the landscape significance of the property as a whole. Especially notable are the Moreton Bay figs, the weeping elm, an English oak, and macadamia nut tree.

== See also ==
- Architecture of Melbourne
- List of non-government schools in Victoria, Australia
- List of places on the Victorian Heritage Register in the City of Bayside
