= Nellie Melba =

Australian opera singer (1861–1931)

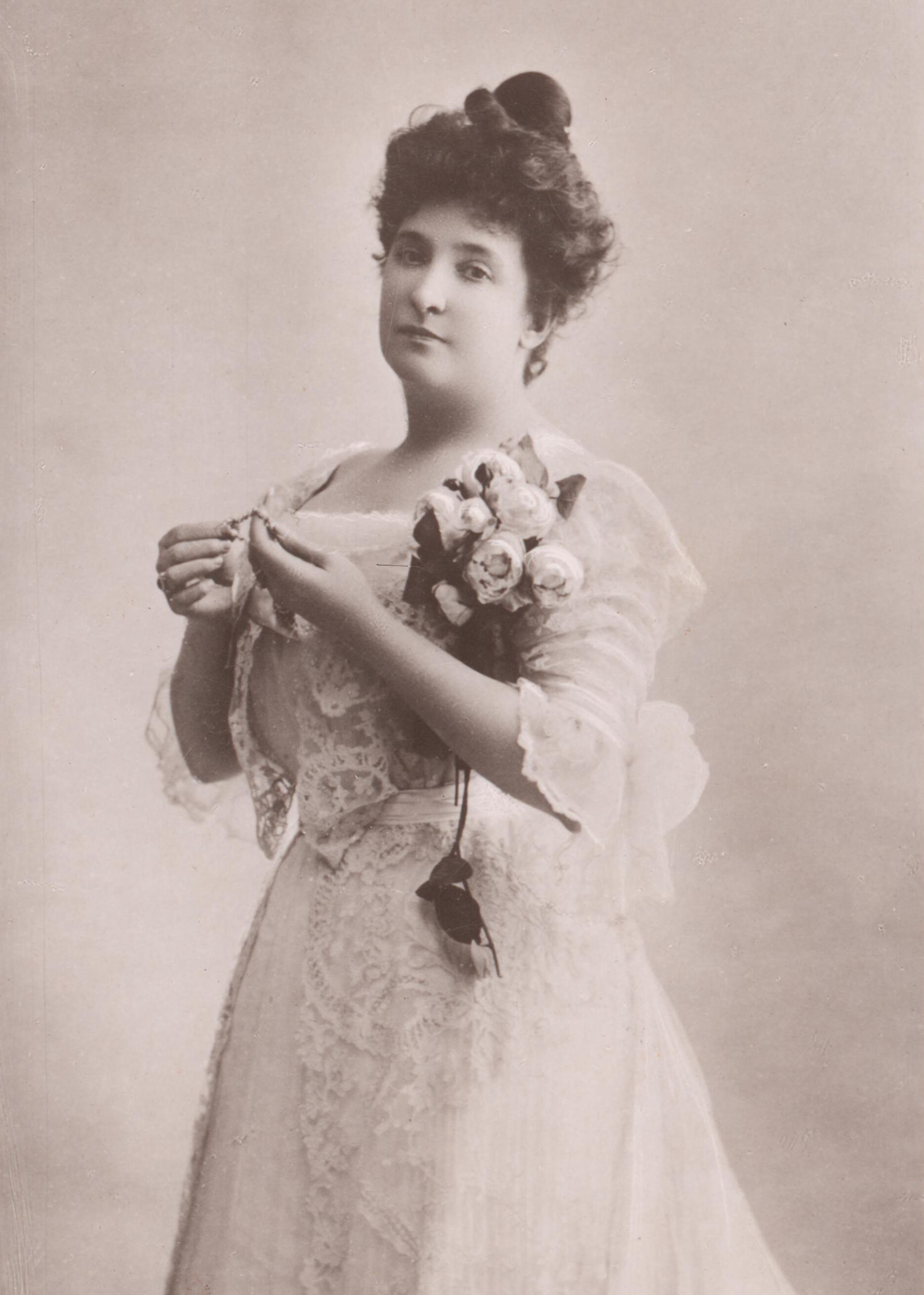
Melba, c. 1907

Dame Nellie Melba GBE (born Helen Porter Mitchell; 19 May 1861 – 23 February 1931) was an Australian operatic lyric coloratura soprano. She became one of the most famous singers of the late Victorian era and the early twentieth century, and was the first Australian to achieve international recognition as a classical musician. She took the pseudonym "Melba" from Melbourne, her home town.

Melba studied singing in Melbourne and made a modest success in performances there. After a brief and unsuccessful marriage, she moved to Europe in search of a singing career. Failing to find engagements in London, England, in 1886, she studied in Paris, France, and soon made a great success there and in Brussels, Belgium. Returning to London, she quickly established herself as the leading lyric soprano at Covent Garden from 1888. She soon achieved further success in Paris and elsewhere in Europe, and later at the Metropolitan Opera in New York City, debuting there in 1893. Her repertoire was small; in her whole career she sang no more than 25 roles and was closely identified with only 10. She was known for her performances in French and Italian opera, but sang little German opera.

During the First World War, Melba raised large sums for war charities. She returned to Australia frequently during the 20th century, singing in opera and concerts, and had a house built for her near Melbourne. She was active in the teaching of singing at the Melbourne Conservatorium. Melba continued to sing until the last months of her life and made a large number of "farewell" appearances. Her death, in Australia, was news across the English-speaking world, and her funeral was a major national event. The Australian $100 note features her image.

== Life and career ==
Melba, drawn by Frank Haviland

=== Early years ===
Melba was born in Richmond, Victoria, the eldest of seven children of the builder David Mitchell and his wife Isabella Ann née Dow (1833–1881). (Note: The Oxford Dictionary of National Biography incorrectly gives Melba's mother the maiden name of Dorn. "Dow" is confirmed in Blainey 2008, p. 5, and Hetherington 1967, p. 17) Mitchell emigrated from Forfarshire, Scotland, to Australia in 1852, married Isabella in 1856 and became a successful builder. Melba was taught to play the piano and first sang in public around age six. (Note: In her memoirs, Melba gives her age at her debut as six, but her statements about her age were not always accurate.) She was educated at a local boarding school and then at the Presbyterian Ladies' College. She studied singing with Mary Ellen Christian (a former pupil of Manuel García) and Pietro Cecchi, an Italian tenor, who was a respected teacher in Melbourne. In her teens, Melba continued to perform in amateur concerts in and around Melbourne, and she played the organ at church. Her father encouraged her in her musical studies, but he strongly disapproved of her taking up singing as a career. Melba's mother died suddenly in 1881 at Richmond.

Melba's father moved the family to Mackay, Queensland, where he built a new sugar mill. Melba soon became popular in Mackay society for her singing and piano-playing. On 22 December 1882 in Brisbane, she married Charles Nesbitt Frederick Armstrong (1858–1948), the youngest son of Sir Andrew Armstrong. They had one child, a son, George, born on 16 October 1883. The marriage was not a success; Charles reportedly beat his wife more than once. The couple separated after just over a year, and Melba returned to Melbourne determined to pursue a singing career, debuting professionally in concerts in 1884. She was often accompanied in concert, and some of her concerts were organised, at times throughout her career by the flautist John Lemmone, who became a "lifelong friend and counsellor". On the strength of local success, she travelled to London in search of an opportunity. (Note: Melba travelled to London with her father, and her husband moved to Europe for a time and was in periodic, though often unwelcome, contact with his wife and child.) Her debut at the Princes' Hall in 1886 made little impression, and she sought work unsuccessfully from Sir Arthur Sullivan, Carl Rosa and Augustus Harris. She then went to Paris to study with the leading teacher Mathilde Marchesi, who instantly recognised the young singer's potential: she exclaimed, "J'ai enfin une étoile!" ("I have a star at last!"). Melba made such rapid progress that she was allowed to sing the "Mad Scene" from Ambroise Thomas's Hamlet at a matinée musicale in Marchesi's house in December the same year, in the presence of the composer.

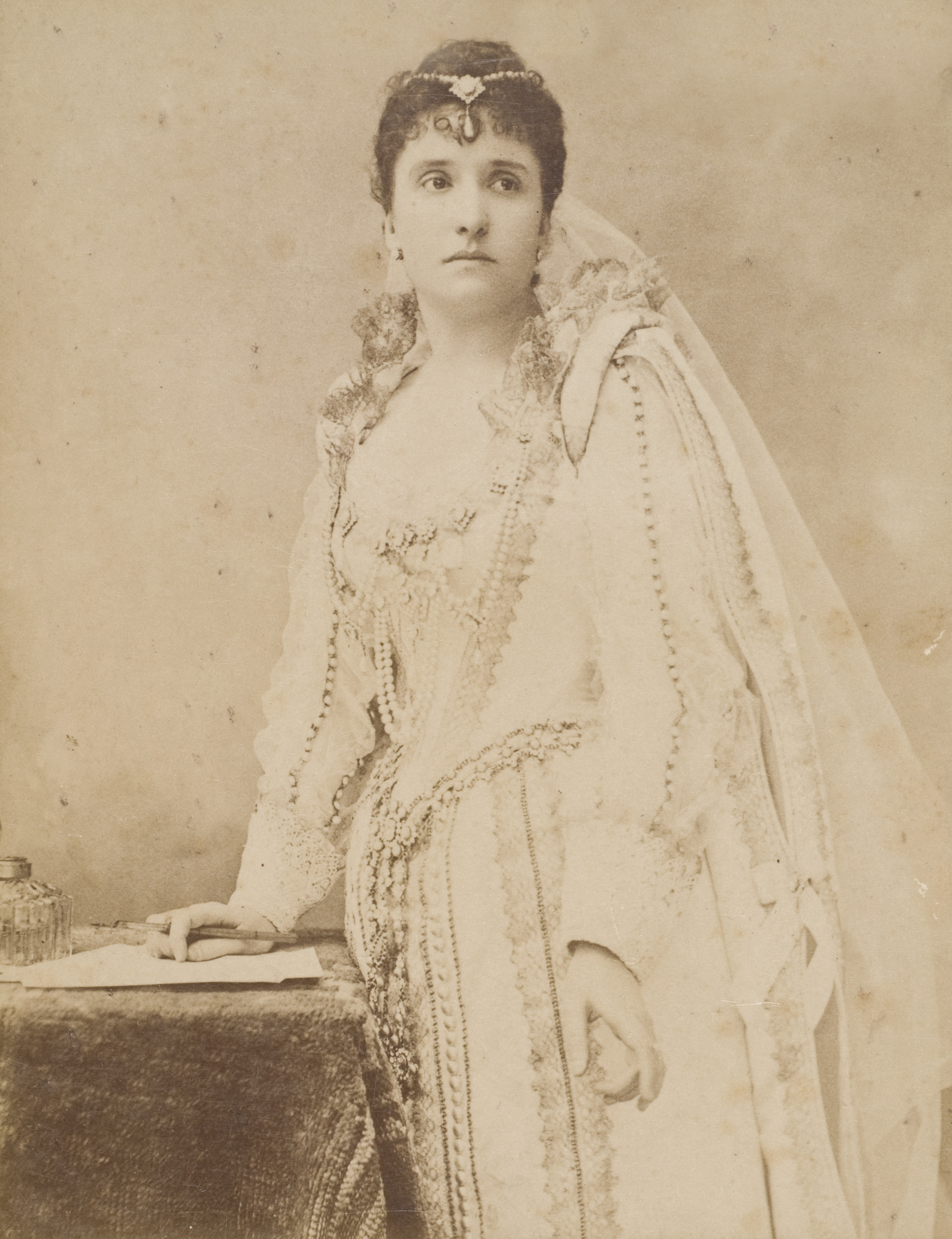
Melba in costume for Lucia di Lammermoor, 1888 (photo by Nadar)

The young singer's talent was so evident that, after less than a year with Marchesi, the impresario Maurice Strakosch gave her a ten-year contract at 1000 francs annually. After she had signed, she received a far better offer of 3000 francs per month from the Théàtre de la Monnaie, Brussels, but Strakosch would not release her and obtained an injunction preventing her from accepting it. She was in despair when the matter was resolved by Strakosch's sudden death. She made her operatic debut four days later as Gilda in Rigoletto at La Monnaie on 12 October 1887. The critic Herman Klein described her Gilda as "an instant triumph of the most emphatic kind ... followed ... a few nights later with an equal success as Violetta in La traviata." It was at this time, on Marchesi's advice, that she adopted the stage name of "Melba", a contraction of the name of her home city. (Note: A similar course was followed by some other Australian singers: Florence Mary Wilson took the stage name Florence Austral, and Elsie Mary Fischer renamed herself Elsa Stralia – both after Australia; June Mary Gough adopted the name June Bronhill after Broken Hill, New South Wales.)

=== London, Paris and New York debuts ===
"Del ciel clemente un riso"
from "Il dolce suono" (Mad Scene), Lucia di Lammermoor

Melba made her Covent Garden début in May 1888, in the title role in Lucia di Lammermoor. She received a friendly but not excited reception. The Musical Times wrote, "Madame Melba is a fluent vocalist, and a quite respectable representative of light soprano parts; but she lacks the personal charm necessary to a great figure on the lyric stage." She was offended when Augustus Harris, then in charge at Covent Garden, offered her only the small role of the page Oscar in Un ballo in maschera for the next season. She left England vowing never to return. The following year, she performed at the Opéra in Paris, in the role of Ophélie in Hamlet; The Times described this as "a brilliant success", and said, "Madame Melba has a voice of great flexibility ... her acting is expressive and striking."

Melba had a strong supporter in London, Lady de Grey, whose views carried weight at Covent Garden. Melba was persuaded to return, and Harris cast her in Roméo et Juliette (June 1889) co-starring with Jean de Reszke. She later recalled, "I date my success in London quite distinctly from the great night of 15 June 1889." After this, she returned to Paris as Ophélie, Lucia in Lucia di Lammermoor, Gilda in Rigoletto, Marguerite in Faust, and Juliette. In French operas her pronunciation was poor, but the composer Delibes said that he did not care whether she sang in French, Italian, German, English or Chinese, as long as she sang. (Note: "Qu'elle chante Lakmé en français, en italien, en allemande, en anglais ou en chinois, cela m'est égal, mais qu'elle la chante.")

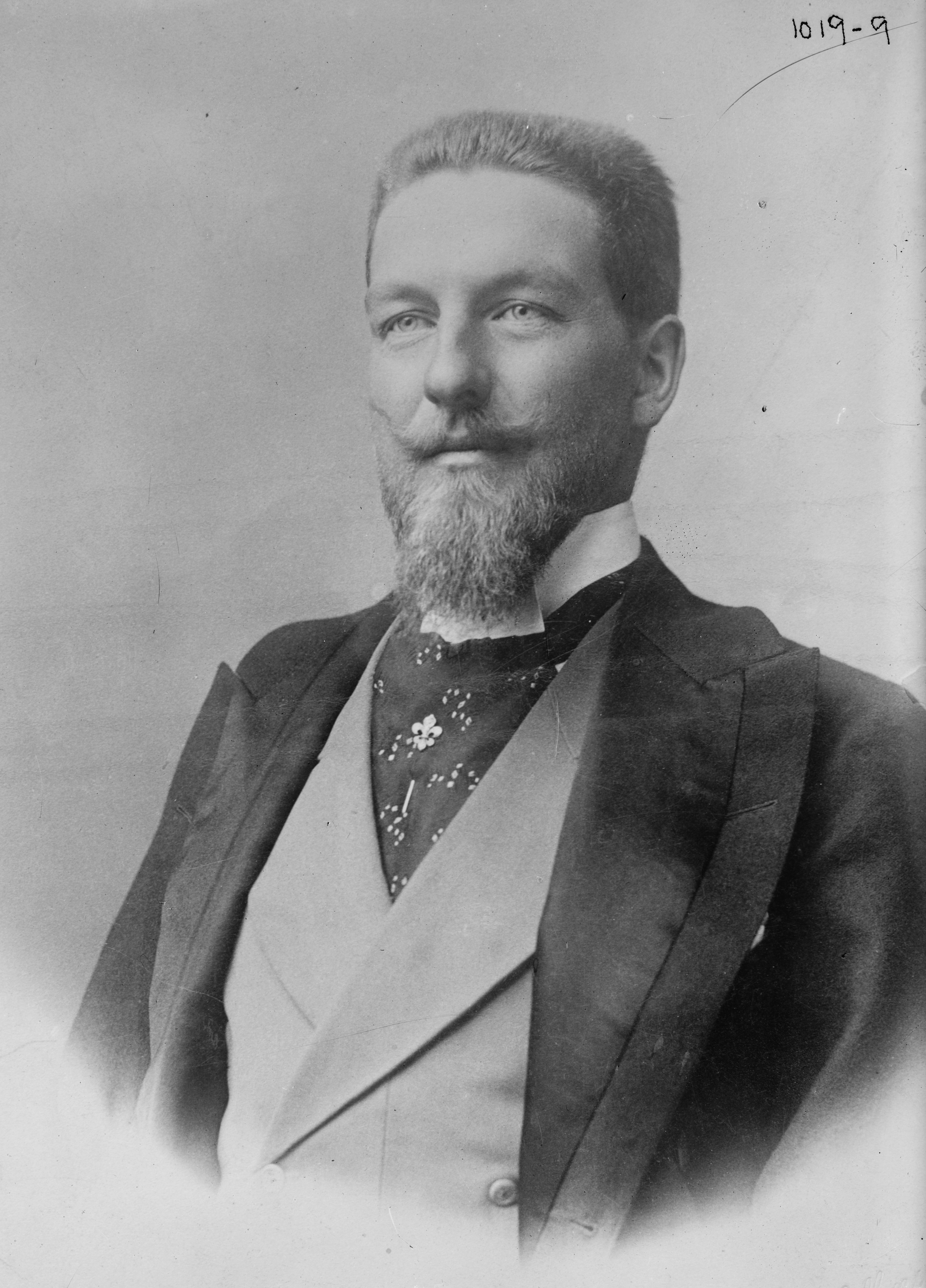
Philippe, Duke of Orléans

In the early 1890s, Melba embarked on an affair with Prince Philippe, Duke of Orléans, pretender to the throne of France. They were seen frequently together in London, which excited some gossip, but far more suspicion arose when Melba travelled across Europe to St Petersburg to sing for Tsar Nicholas II: the Duke followed closely behind her, and they were spotted together in Paris, Brussels, Vienna and St Petersburg. Armstrong filed divorce proceedings on the grounds of Melba's adultery, naming the Duke as co-respondent; he was eventually persuaded to drop the case, and the Duke began a two-year African safari without Melba. He and Melba did not resume their relationship. In the first years of the decade, Melba appeared in the leading European opera houses, including Milan, Berlin and Vienna.

Melba sang the role of Nedda in Pagliacci at Covent Garden in 1893, soon after its Italian premiere. The composer was present and said that the role had never been so well played before. In December of that year, Melba sang at the Metropolitan Opera in New York for the first time. As at her Covent Garden debut, she appeared as Lucia di Lammermoor and, as at Covent Garden, it was less than a triumph. The New York Times praised her performance – "one of the loveliest voices that ever issued from a human throat ... simply delicious in its fullness, richness and purity" – but the work was out of fashion, and the performances were poorly attended. Her performance in Roméo et Juliette, later in the season, was a triumph and established her as the leading prima donna of the time in succession to Adelina Patti. She had at first been nonplussed by the impenetrable snobbery at the Metropolitan; the author Peter Conrad has written, "In London she hobnobbed with royalty; in New York she was a singing menial." Assured of critical success, she set herself to achieve social recognition, and succeeded.

"Air des bijoux"
From Faust, 1910

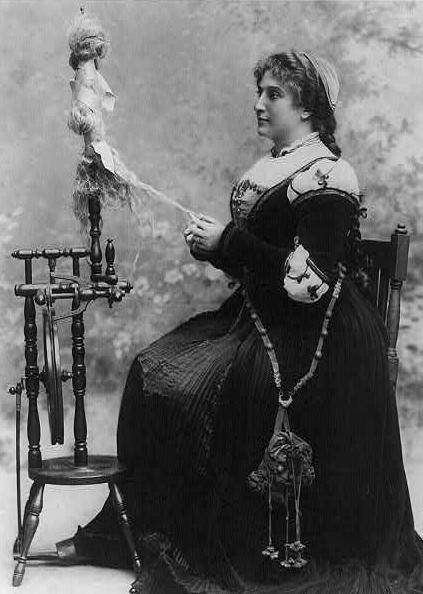
Melba as Marguerite in Faust

From the 1890s, Melba played a wide range of parts at Covent Garden, mostly in the lyric soprano repertoire, but with some heavier roles also. She sang the title roles in Herman Bemberg's Elaine and Arthur Thomas's Esmeralda. Her Italian parts included Gilda in Rigoletto, the title role in Aida, Desdemona in Otello, Luisa in Mascagni's I Rantzau, Nedda in Pagliacci, Rosina in The Barber of Seville, Violetta in La traviata, and Mimì in La bohème. In the French repertoire, she sang Juliette in Roméo et Juliette, Marguerite in Faust, Marguerite de Valois in Les Huguenots, the title role in Saint-Saëns's Hélène, which was written for her, and Micaëla in Carmen.

Some writers expressed surprise at Melba's playing the last of these roles, since it was merely a supporting part in the opera. She played it on many occasions, saying in her memoirs, "Why on earth a prima donna should not sing secondary rôles I could not see then and am no nearer seeing to-day. I hate the artistic snobbery of it." She sang the role opposite the Carmens of Emma Calvé, Zélie de Lussan and Maria Gay. Marguerite de Valois, too, is not the leading female role in Les Huguenots, but Melba was willing to undertake it as seconda donna to Emma Albani. She was generous in support of singers who did not rival her in her favoured roles, but was, as her biographer J. B. Steane put it, "pathologically critical" of other lyric sopranos.

Melba was not known as a Wagner singer, although she occasionally sang Elsa in Lohengrin and Elisabeth in Tannhäuser. She received a certain amount of praise in these roles, although Klein found her unsuited to them, and Bernard Shaw thought she sang with great skill but played artificially and without sensibility. In 1896 at the Metropolitan, she attempted the role of Brünnhilde in Siegfried, in which she was not a success. Her most frequent role in that house was Marguerite in Gounod's Faust, which she had studied under the supervision of the composer. She never essayed any of Mozart's operas, for which some thought her voice ideally suited. Her repertoire across her entire career amounted to no more than 25 roles, of which, The Times obituarist wrote, "only some 10 parts are those which will be remembered as her own."

Melba's marriage to Armstrong was finally terminated when, having emigrated to the United States with their son, he divorced her in Texas in 1900.

=== Twentieth century ===
Melba in 1904

By now established as a leading star in Britain and America, Melba made her first return visit to Australia in 1902–03 for a concert tour, also touring in New Zealand. (Note: Melba visited New Zealand in February 1903 after her tour of Australia. She arrived in Invercargill from Hobart and was welcomed by Sir Joseph Ward (who was later the Prime Minister of New Zealand) and Lady Ward. After giving one concert in Dunedin she travelled to Christchurch and gave a concert in Wellington.) The profits were unprecedented; she returned for four more tours during her career. In Britain, Melba campaigned on behalf of Puccini's La bohème. She had first sung the part of Mimì in 1899, having studied it with the composer. She argued strongly for further productions of the work in the face of the distaste expressed by the Covent Garden management at this "new and plebeian opera". She was vindicated by the public enthusiasm for the piece, which was bolstered in 1902 when Enrico Caruso joined her in the first of many Covent Garden performances together. She sang Mimì for Oscar Hammerstein I at his opera house in New York, in 1907, giving the enterprise a needed boost. After her initial successes in Brussels and Paris in the 1880s, Melba sang infrequently on the European continent; only the English-speaking countries welcomed her wholeheartedly.

She performed 26 times at the Royal Albert Hall in London between 1898 and 1926. Although she called Covent Garden "my artistic home", her appearances there became less frequent in the 20th century. One reason for this was that she did not get on well with Sir Thomas Beecham, who was in control of the opera house for much of the period from 1910 until her retirement. She said, "I dislike Beecham and his methods", and he thought that while she had "nearly all the attributes inseparable from great artistry ... she was wanting in a genuine spiritual refinement." Another factor in her reduced appearances at Covent Garden was the appearance on the scene of Luisa Tetrazzini, a soprano ten years her junior, who became a great success in London and later in New York in roles previously associated with Melba. A third reason was her decision to spend more time in Australia. In 1909 she undertook what she called a "sentimental tour" of Australia that covered 16,093 kilometres (10,000 mi) and included many remote towns. In 1911 in partnership with the J. C. Williamson company, she appeared in an operatic season. Her attitude to her tour concerts and the audiences attending was summed up in the advice that Clara Butt said Melba gave her apropos of a planned Australian tour: "Sing 'em muck; it's all they can understand." (Note: Melba later denied giving this advice and was horrified when Butt printed it in her memoirs.) To another colleague and compatriot, Peter Dawson, she described his home city of Adelaide as "that city of the three P's – Parsons, Pubs and Prostitutes."

"Sempre libera"
From La traviata, 1904

"Ah, fors' è lui"
From La traviata, 1907

In 1909, Melba bought property at Coldstream, a small town near Melbourne, and in 1912 she had a home built there (extending an existing cottage) that she re-named as Coombe Cottage, after a house she had rented near London. She also set up a music school in Richmond, which she later merged into the Melbourne Conservatorium. She was in Australia when the First World War broke out, and she threw herself into fund-raising for war charities, raising £100,000. (Note: Equivalent in 2008 values to £3,630,000 using the UK retail price index or £17,900,000 using average UK earnings.) In recognition of this, she was appointed as a Dame Commander of the Order of the British Empire (DBE) in March 1918, "for services in organising patriotic work". (Note: The appointment was announced on 5 March 1918, but The London Gazette stated, "The appointments to date from the 1st January, 1918". It is therefore correctly stated that Melba was, with May Whitty, the first stage performer to be made a DBE, although Whitty had received the honour in January.)

After the war, Melba made a triumphant return to the Royal Opera House, in a performance of La bohème conducted by Beecham, which re-opened the house after four years of closure. The Times wrote, "Probably no season at Covent Garden has ever started with quite the thrill of enthusiasm which passed through the house." In her many concerts, however, her repertoire was regarded as trite and predictable. After one of them The Musical Times wrote:

The real musical interest of the afternoon, however, was supposed to centre in the "Jewel Song" from Faust, Puccini's "Addio", Lieurance's "By the waters of Minnetonka", and Tosti's "Good-bye", and in the encores, thoughtfully announced beforehand – "Home, sweet Home" and "Annie Laurie." Look again at the last batch of head-lines. "The Diva to go home." By all means. Why not? As the Diva has melodiously declared (only too often), there's no place like it. "And teach 100 girls herself." If the Dame can give those hundred girls her own beautiful voice, well and good, but for heaven's sake let a musician be called in to attend to their repertoire. We cannot lightly face the prospect of a hundred débutantes let loose on us a year hence full to the epiglottis with "Minnetonkas", "Jewel Songs", and "Home, sweet Homes".

Melba in 1913

In 1922, Melba returned to Australia, where she sang at the immensely successful "Concerts for the People" in Melbourne and Sydney, with low ticket prices, attracting 70,000 people. In 1924 for another Williamson opera season, she caused resentment among local singers by importing an entire chorus from Naples. In 1926 she made her farewell appearance at Covent Garden, singing in scenes from Roméo et Juliette, Otello, and La bohème. She is well remembered in Australia for her seemingly endless series of "farewell" appearances, including stage performances in the mid-1920s and concerts in Sydney on 7 August 1928, Melbourne on 27 September 1928 and Geelong in November 1928. From this, she is remembered in the vernacular Australian expression "more farewells than Dame Nellie Melba".

In 1929 she returned for the last time to Europe and then visited Egypt, where she contracted a fever that she never entirely shook off. Her last performance was in London at a charity concert on 10 June 1930. She returned to Australia but died in St Vincent's Hospital, Sydney, in 1931, aged 69, of septicaemia which had developed after facial surgery in Europe some time before. She was given an elaborate funeral from Scots' Church, Melbourne, which her father had built and where as a teenager she had sung in the choir. The funeral motorcade was over a kilometre long, and her death made front-page headlines in Australia, the United Kingdom, New Zealand, and Europe. Billboards in many countries said simply "Melba is dead". Part of the event was filmed for posterity. Melba was buried in the cemetery at Lilydale, near Coldstream. Her headstone, designed by Sir Edwin Lutyens, bears the farewell words of Mimì in La bohème: "Addio, senza rancor" (Farewell, without bitterness).

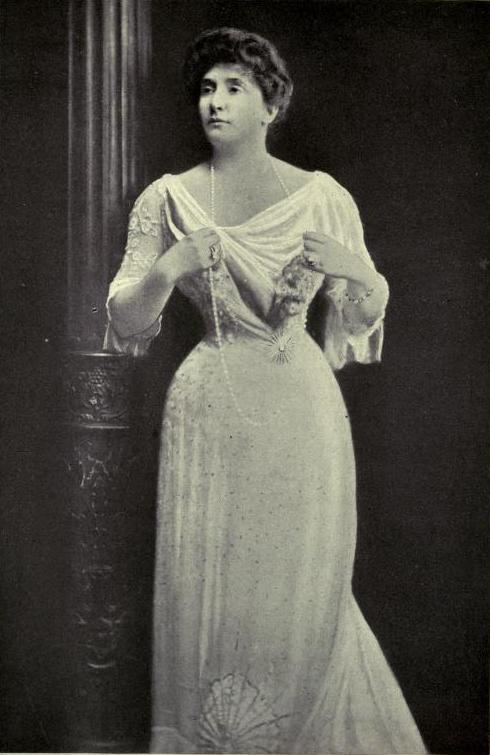
Melba with the Metropolitan Opera

== Teacher and patron ==
Despite the antipathy Melba inspired in some of her peers, she helped the careers of younger singers. She taught for many years at the Conservatorium in Melbourne and looked for a "new Melba". She published a book about her methods, which were based on those of Marchesi. The book opens:

It is easy to sing well, and very difficult to sing badly! How many students are really prepared to accept that statement? Few, if any. They smile, and say: "It may be easy for you, but not for me." And they seem to think that there the matter ends. But if they only knew it, on their understanding and acceptance of that axiom depends half their success. Let me say the same in other words: In order to sing well, it is necessary to sing easily.

"O soave fanciulla"
from Puccini's La bohème, sung by Enrico Caruso and Melba in 1906

Others also benefited from Melba's praise and interest. She passed her own cadenzas on to a young Gertrude Johnson, a valuable professional asset. In 1924, Melba brought the new star Toti Dal Monte, fresh from triumphs in Milan and Paris but still unheard in England or the United States, to Australia as a principal of the Melba-Williamson Grand Opera Company. After sharing the Covent Garden stage in a 1923 night of operatic extracts with another Australian soprano, Florence Austral (who, as a dramatic soprano, posed no threat to Melba, a lyric soprano), Melba was effusive with her praise, describing the younger woman as "one of the wonder-voices of the world". She similarly described the American contralto Louise Homer as possessing "the world's most beautiful voice". She gave financial assistance to the Australian painter Hugh Ramsay, living in poverty in Paris and also helped him to forge connections in the artistic world. The Australian baritone John Brownlee and tenor Browning Mummery were both protégés: both sang with her in her 1926 Covent Garden farewell (recorded by His Master's Voice), and Brownlee sang with her on two of her last commercial recordings later that year (a session arranged by her in part to promote Brownlee).

== Recordings and broadcasts ==
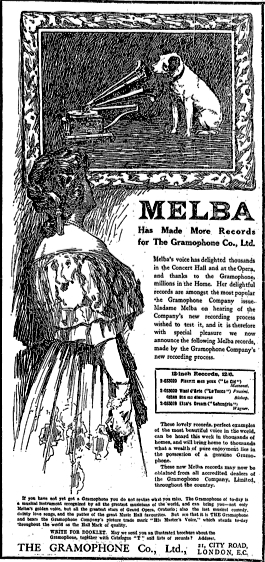
Newspaper advertisement

Melba's first recordings were made around 1895, recorded on cylinders at the Bettini Phonograph Lab in New York. A reporter from Phonoscope magazine was impressed: "The next cylinder was labelled 'Melba' and was truly wonderful, the phonograph reproducing her wonderful voice in a marvellous manner, especially the high notes which soared away above the staff and were rich and clear." Melba was less impressed: "'Never again,' I said to myself as I listened to the scratching, screeching result. 'Don't tell me I sing like that, or I shall go away and live on a desert island.'" The recordings never reached the general public – destroyed on Melba's orders, it is suspected – and Melba would not venture into a recording studio for another eight years. Melba can be heard singing on several Mapleson Cylinders, early attempts at live recording, made by the Metropolitan Opera House librarian Lionel Mapleson in the auditorium there during performances. These cylinders are often poor in quality, but they preserve something of the quality of the young Melba's voice and performance that is sometimes lacking from her commercial recordings. (Note: The cylinder Melba is most renowned for, Queen Marguerite's cabaletta from Les Huguenots, may not in fact feature her, but rather her contemporary Suzanne Adams: the sonics of the recording do not match others of the same year, and the paper evidence points to Adams; but the singer sounds more like the Melba rather than the Adams both known from their commercial recordings.)

Melba made numerous gramophone (phonograph) records of her voice in England and America between 1904 (when she was in her 40s) and 1926 for the Gramophone & Typewriter Company and the Victor Talking Machine Company. Most of these recordings, consisting of operatic arias, duets and ensemble pieces and songs, have been re-released on CD. The poor audio fidelity of the Melba recordings reflects the limitations of the early days of commercial sound recording. Melba's acoustical recordings (especially those made after her initial 1904 session) fail to capture vital overtones to the voice, leaving it without the body and warmth it possessed – albeit to a limited degree – in life. Despite this, they still reveal Melba to have had an almost seamlessly pure lyric soprano voice with effortless coloratura, a smooth legato and accurate intonation. Melba had perfect pitch; the critic Michael Aspinall says of her complete London recordings issued on LP, that there are only two lapses from pitch in the entire set. Like Patti, and unlike the more vibrant-voiced Tetrazzini, Melba's exceptional purity of tone was probably one of the principal reasons why British audiences, with their strong choral and sacred music traditions, idolised her.

His Master's Voice advertisement for Melba recordings (1904)

Melba's farewell to Covent Garden on 8 June 1926 was recorded by His Master's Voice, as well as broadcast. The programme included Act 2 of Roméo et Juliette (not recorded because the tenor Charles Hackett was not under contract to His Master's Voice), followed by the opening of Act 4 of Otello (Desdemona's "Willow Song" and "Ave Maria") and Acts 3 and 4 of La bohème (with Aurora Rettore, Browning Mummery, John Brownlee and others). The conductor was Vincenzo Bellezza. At the conclusion Lord Stanley of Alderley made a formal address and Melba gave an emotional farewell speech. In a pioneering venture, eleven sides (78 rpm) were recorded via a landline to Gloucester House (London), though in the event only three of these were published. The full series (including both speeches) was included in a 1976 His Master's Voice reissue.

As was the case in many of her performances, most of Melba's recordings were made at "French Pitch" (A=435 Hz), rather than the British early 20th century standard of A=452 Hz, or the modern standard of A=440 Hz. This, and the technical inadequacies of the early recording process (discs were frequently recorded faster or slower than the supposed standard of 78 rpm, whilst the conditions of the cramped recording studios – kept very warm to keep the wax at the necessary softness when cutting – would wreak havoc with instrumental tuning during recording sessions), means that playing her recordings back in the speed and pitch she made them at is not always a simple matter.

On 15 June 1920, Melba was heard in a pioneering radio broadcast from Guglielmo Marconi's New Street Works factory in Chelmsford, singing two arias and her famous trill. She was the first artist of international renown to participate in direct radio broadcasts. Radio enthusiasts across the country heard her, and the broadcast was reportedly heard from as far away as New York. People listening on the radio barely heard a few scratches of the trill and two arias she sang. Further radio broadcasts would include her Covent Garden farewell performance, and a 1927 "Empire Broadcast" (broadcast throughout the British Empire, by radio stations AWA and 2FC, Sydney, on Monday 5 September 1927; it was relayed by the BBC London on Sunday 4 September).

== Honours, memorials and legacy ==
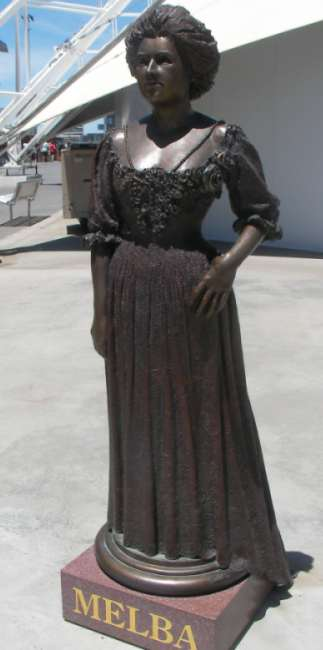
Statue of Melba at Waterfront City, Melbourne Docklands

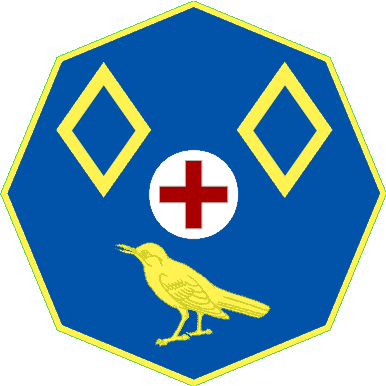
Centre portion of Melba's arms, granted in 1920 Escutcheon: Azure on a plate between in chief two mascles and in base a nightingale or, with a cross gules at centre.

Melba was appointed Dame Commander of the Order of the British Empire in the 1918 New Year Honours, along with May Whitty the first stage performer to receive this order, for her charity work during World War I, and was elevated to Dame Grand Cross of the Order of the British Empire in the 1927 Birthday Honours List. She was the first Australian to appear on the cover of Time magazine, in April 1927. A stained-glass window commemorating Melba was erected in 1962 in the Musicians' Memorial Chapel of the church of St Sepulchre-without-Newgate, London. She is one of only two singers – the other being Adelina Patti – with a marble bust on the grand staircase of the Royal Opera House, Covent Garden.

A blue plaque commemorates Melba at Coombe House, Devey Close in Coombe, Kingston upon Thames, where she lived in 1906. She was inducted onto the Victorian Honour Roll of Women in 2001. Melba was closely associated with the Melbourne Conservatorium, and this institution was renamed the Melba Memorial Conservatorium of Music in her honour in 1956. The music hall at the University of Melbourne is known as Melba Hall. The Canberra suburb of Melba is named after her.

The Australian $100 note features the image of her face, and her likeness has also appeared on an Australian stamp. Sydney Town Hall has a marble relief bearing the inscription "Remember Melba", unveiled during a World War II charity concert in memory of Melba and her First World War charity work and patriotic concerts. A tunnel on Melbourne's EastLink freeway is named in her honour. Streets named after her include Melba Avenue in San Francisco, Avenue Nellie Melba / Nellie Melbalaan in the Brussels municipality of Anderlecht, and the Melba Highway, in Melbourne, Victoria, Australia.

Melba's home in Marian, Queensland, during her brief cohabitation with her husband, was relocated from the Marian Mill (where it was due to be demolished) to a riverbank setting along the main Eungella Road in Edward Lloyd Park, where, under the name Melba House, it was restored and now operates as a Melba museum and the Pioneer Valley Visitor Information Centre. Her home, Coombe Cottage in Coldstream, Victoria, passed to her granddaughter Pamela, Lady Vestey (1918–2011); and it is now owned by Lady Vestey's sons, Sam (3rd Baron Vestey) and Mark, who reside in the United Kingdom. The house was designed by John Harry Grainger, father of the composer Percy Grainger, and a close friend of Melba's father David Mitchell.

Melba's name is associated with four foods, all of which were created in her honour by the French chef Auguste Escoffier:

- Peach Melba, a dessert made of peaches, raspberry sauce, and vanilla ice cream
- Melba sauce, a sweet purée of raspberries and red currant
- Melba toast, a crisp dry toast
- Melba Garniture, chicken, truffles and mushrooms stuffed into tomatoes with velouté sauce.

Melba planted a variety of poplar tree known as Populus × canadensis "Aurea", or golden poplar, on the Central Lawn in Melbourne Botanic Gardens on 11 April 1903, which has become known as "Melba's poplar". On 19 May 2011, Google celebrated her 150th birthday with a Google Doodle.

== Books, films and television ==
Melba's autobiography, Melodies and Memories, was published in 1925, largely ghost-written by her secretary Beverley Nichols. Nichols later complained that Melba did not cooperate in the process of writing or by reviewing what he wrote. Full-length biographies devoted to her include those by Agnes G. Murphy (1909), John Hetherington (1967), Thérèse Radic (1986), Ann Blainey (2009), and Richard Davis (2025).

A novel, Evensong, by Nichols (1932), was based on aspects of Melba's life, that drew an unflattering portrait. The 1934 motion picture adaptation of Evensong, starred Evelyn Laye as the character based on Melba, was for a time banned in Australia. Melba appears in the 1946 novel Lucinda Brayford by Martin Boyd. She is depicted as singing at a garden party thrown by the mother of the eponymous heroine, when she is described as having the "loveliest voice in the world".

In 1946–1947 Crawford Productions produced a radio series on Melba that starred Glenda Raymond, who became one of the foundation singers of the Australian Opera (later Opera Australia) in 1956. In 1953 a biopic titled Melba was released by Horizon Pictures and directed by Lewis Milestone. Melba was played by the soprano Patrice Munsel. In 1987 the Australian Broadcasting Corporation produced a mini-series, Melba, that starred Linda Cropper miming to the singing voice of Yvonne Kenny. Melba was portrayed by Kiri Te Kanawa in episode 3 of season 4 of the British ITV television show Downton Abbey (2013), performed at the abbey as a guest of Lord and Lady Grantham. Rupert Christiansen, in The Daily Telegraph, bemoaned the cast and the fact checking.

Melba appeared in a pivotal scene in the 2014 novel Tell by Frances Itani.

== Notes and references ==
=== Sources ===
- Beecham, Thomas (1959). A Mingled Chime. London: Hutchinson. OCLC 470511334.
- Blainey, Ann (2008). I am Melba. Melbourne: Black Inc. ISBN 978-1-86395-183-8. (US edition (2009) published as Marvelous Melba: The Extraordinary Life of a Great Diva. Chicago: Ivan R. Dee. ISBN 978-1-56663-809-8)
- Conrad, Peter (1987). A Song of Love and Death – The Meaning of Opera. London: Chatto and Windus. ISBN 0-7011-3274-4.
- Gubler, Franz (2012). Great, Grand & Famous Opera Houses. Crows Nest: Arbon. ISBN 978-0-987-28202-6.
- Hetherington, John (1967). Melba, a Biography. London: Faber and Faber. OCLC 7389273.
- Jefferson, Alan (1979). Sir Thomas Beecham – A Centenary Tribute. London: Macdonald and Jane's. ISBN 035404205X.
- Lucas, John (2008). Thomas Beecham – An Obsession with Music. Woodbridge: Boydell Press. ISBN 978-1-84383-402-1.
- Shaw, Bernard (1981). Dan H. Laurence (ed.). Shaw's Music – The Complete Musical Criticism of Bernard Shaw. Vol. 2. London: The Bodley Head. ISBN 0-370-31271-6.
