= David Mitchell (builder) =

Scottish-Australian builder (1829–1916)

- Born: David Mitchell; 16 February 1829; Forfarshire, Scotland
- Died: 25 March 1916 (aged 87); Richmond, Melbourne, Australia
- Occupation: Builder
- Children: Nellie Melba, nine others
- Parent(s): William Mitchell; Anne

David Mitchell (16 February 1829 – 25 March 1916) was a Scottish-Australian builder, responsible for Melbourne's Royal Exhibition Building. He was the father of Dame Nellie Melba.

== Biography ==
Born in Forfarshire, Scotland, in 1829, David Mitchell emigrated to Australia in 1852.

Mitchell is noted for building Scots' Church, Melbourne, St Patrick's Cathedral, Eastern Hill, Menzies Hotel in William Street, Melbourne (1857), Presbyterian Ladies' College, East Melbourne (1874), and the Italianate mansion, Kamesburgh, in Brighton (1874). His grandest accomplishment was the Royal Exhibition Building, which became the first Australian building to be awarded UNESCO World Heritage status.

In 1878 he bought land outside Lilydale on which he opened and operated the Cave Hill limestone and marble quarry. The business worked in tandem with his building company and was a great success, operating as the David Mitchell Estate Ltd after his death until it was sold to a Belgian conglomerate in 2002. It finally ceased operations in 2015.

David Mitchell died on 25 March 1916 and is buried in the Melbourne General Cemetery.

His eldest daughter, born Helen Porter Mitchell, was the renowned soprano Dame Nellie Melba; artist Helen Lempriere was a niece.
