= Tram shelter, East Melbourne =

Heritage-listed tram shelter in Melbourne, Victoria, Australia

- Tram shelter in 2015

- Location of the tram shelter in Greater Metropolitan Melbourne
- Alternative names: Burston Reserve tram shelter

General information
- Status: Completed
- Type: Tram shelter
- Architectural style: Edwardian
- Location: MacArthur Street and St Andrews Place, East Melbourne, City of Melbourne, Victoria, Australia
- Coordinates: 37°48′42″S 144°58′30″E
- Completed: 1917; 109 years ago
- Client: Melbourne Tramways Board

Technical details
- Material: Ship-lap timber; glass; terracotta; shingles; travertine tiling

Design and construction
- Architect: Frank Stapley

Victorian Heritage Register
- Official name: Tram Shelter
- Type: Registered place
- Designated: 9 March 2000
- Reference no.: VHR H1870
- Heritage overlay no.: HO888
- Category: Transport - Tramways

The tram shelter located on the corner of MacArthur Street and St Andrews Place in East Melbourne was constructed in 1917 for the Melbourne Tramways Board. Also known as the Burston Reserve tram shelter, it is one of only five remaining tram shelters in Melbourne from a distinct group of nine picturesque closed timber shelters built between 1912 and 1927 in a style based on Edwardian domestic fashion. The shelter is located in Burston Reserve, on the north-east corner of the intersection, in the City of Melbourne, in Victoria, Australia.

Built on the traditional lands of the Wurundjeri people, the tram shelter was added to the Victorian Heritage Register on 9 March 2000 in recognition of its historical and architectural significance; and was also added to a non-statutory list by the Victorian branch of the National Trust on 3 April 2000.

== History ==
The Melbourne Tramways Board (MTB) was established in 1916 by the Victorian Government to manage the consolidation of the cable and electric tramway systems in operation in Melbourne by various local government trusts and licensed operators. The growth of tramways was one of the greatest municipal developments in Victoria during the first decade of the twentieth century. The waiting shelter is an important remnant of this period of Melbourne's transport history and a tangible reminder of the MTB that morphed, in 1919, to become the Melbourne & Metropolitan Tramways Board (1919–1983).

Due to Melbourne's changeable weather conditions, the various tramway operators in Melbourne built shelters at tram stops, and a small number of the shelters are extant and in current use. They were initially built in the outer extent of the tramway routes, due to the limited frequency of tram services, where passengers could wait for 15 minutes or more for a tram; or at major interchanges between the various tram routes. Some of the shelters were built from timber and others using iron.

The shelter in East Melbourne, and the shelter in South Melbourne, were both designed by Frank Stapley, an architect who was also a Councillor and briefly, a Lord Mayor of Melbourne. Stapley was an influential advocate for the town planning movement in Victoria. Both shelters were built in 1917 and were related in basic form to the earlier closed shelter of 1915 at the corner of St Kilda Road and Commercial Road. The East Melbourne and South Melbourne shelters were also precedents for the two tram shelters at the St Kilda Road junction with Lorne and High streets, built in 1927.

== Description ==
Half of the front wall of the shelter facing the tram stop is open, while unlike other shelters of the type, the back wall is entirely clad in horizontal ship-lap boarding. Below the windows the shelter is similarly clad and internally the walls are of horizontal V-jointed lining boards. Similar boards cover the ceiling. The benches are of timber frames and slats. The upper halves of timber framed windows are in multi-paned patterned translucent glass with a segmental arch head. Vertical boarding between the frame continues above window head height. The gable section of wall is clad in vertical slats spaced to give ventilation. The gable roof is clad in terracotta shingles with a crested terracotta ridge terminated by scrolled terracotta finials. The rafters are exposed under the projecting eaves with a spaced board lining above. The gables project a similar distance to the eaves and are supported on timber brackets with vertical infill. The upper section is filled with a horizontal board at ceiling height to match the barges and an infill of vertical spaced boards. There is a scrolled carving on the projecting ridge beam and on the end of the barges an upturn that hides the end of the gutter and a point on the lower side.

This shelter differs from the four other shelters of the type in the shape of the roof, which has projecting eaves on the front side only. This shelter is also unique in retaining its timber Tramways Board monogram on the projecting gables, as well as set in travertine mosaic tile in the concrete floor.

== See also ==
- Architecture of Melbourne
- List of places on the Victorian Heritage Register in the City of Melbourne
- Trams in Melbourne
