= Tram shelter, South Melbourne =

Heritage-listed tram shelter in Melbourne, Victoria, Australia

- Location of the tram shelter in Greater Metropolitan Melbourne

General information
- Status: Completed
- Type: Tram shelter
- Architectural style: Edwardian
- Location: St Kilda Road and Dorcas Street, South Melbourne, City of Port Phillip, Victoria, Australia
- Coordinates: 37°49′48″S 144°58′16″E
- Completed: 1917; 109 years ago
- Client: Melbourne Tramways Board

Technical details
- Material: Ship-lap timber; glass; terracotta; shingles

Design and construction
- Architect: Frank Stapley

Victorian Heritage Register
- Official name: Tram Shelter
- Type: Registered place
- Designated: 9 March 2000
- Reference no.: VHR H1869
- Heritage overlay no.: HO460
- Category: Transport - Tramways

The tram shelter located on the corner of St Kilda Road and Dorcas Street in South Melbourne was constructed in 1917 for the Melbourne Tramways Board and is one of only five remaining tram shelters in Melbourne from a distinct group of nine picturesque closed timber shelters built between 1912 and 1927 in a style based on Edwardian domestic fashion. The shelter is located on the median strip on the south-west corner of the intersection, in the City of Port Phillip, in Victoria, Australia.

Built on the traditional lands of the Wurundjeri people, the tram shelter was added to the Victorian Heritage Register on 9 March 2000 in recognition of its historical and architectural significance; and was one of three tram shelters on St Kilda Road added to a non-statutory list by the Victorian branch of the National Trust on 3 April 2000.

== History ==
The Melbourne Tramways Board (MTB) was established in 1916 by the Victorian Government to manage the consolidation of the cable and electric tramway systems in operation in Melbourne by various local government trusts and licensed operators. The growth of tramways was one of the greatest municipal developments in Victoria during the first decade of the twentieth century. The waiting shelter is an important remnant of this period of Melbourne's transport history and a tangible reminder of the MTB that morphed, in 1919, to become the Melbourne & Metropolitan Tramways Board (1919–1983).

Due to Melbourne's changeable weather conditions, the various tramway operators in Melbourne built shelters at tram stops, and a small number of the shelters are extant and in current use. They were initially built in the outer extent of the tramway routes, due to the limited frequency of tram services, where passengers could wait for 15 minutes or more for a tram; or at major interchanges between the various tram routes. Some of the shelters were built from timber and others using iron.

The shelter in South Melbourne, and the shelter in East Melbourne, were both designed by Frank Stapley, an architect who was also a Councillor and briefly, a Lord Mayor of Melbourne. Stapley was an influential advocate for the town planning movement in Victoria. Both shelters were built in 1917 and were related in basic form to the earlier closed shelter of 1915 at the corner of St Kilda Road and Commercial Road. The East Melbourne and South Melbourne shelters were also precedents for the two tram shelters at the St Kilda Road junction with Lorne and High streets, built in 1927.

== Description ==
The timber-framed shelter with raised timber floor is clad to sill height externally in horizontal ship-lap boards and internally in vertical V-jointed lining boards. Similar boards cover the ceiling. The floor is the concrete slab upon which the shelter stands. The benches are of timber frames and slats. The upper halves of timber-framed windows are in multi-paned patterned translucent glass with a segmental arch head. The framing continues above with internal and external vertical boarding set in to the same depth as the window. The gable section of wall is clad in vertical slats spaced to give ventilation. The gable roof is clad in terracotta shingles with a crested terracotta ridge. The rafters are exposed under the projecting eaves with a spaced board lining above. The gables project a similar distance to the eaves and are supported on timber brackets with vertical infill. The upper section is filled with a horizontal board at ceiling height to match the barges and an infill of vertical spaced boards. This shelter shows typical scrolled carving of the projecting ridge-beam and barge end upturns which hides the end of the gutter. The Dorcas Street shelter has, in addition, small timber bosses in the spandrels of the window head arches.

The shelter has lost its original Tramways Board monograms from the projecting gable ends. The shelter has been moved a distance from its original location on the median at the junction with Dorcas Street, and the opening which originally faced the centre of the street, has been reoriented. The shelter sustained considerable damage in the 1990s and was subsequently repaired.

== See also ==
- Architecture of Melbourne
- List of places on the Victorian Heritage Register in the City of Port Phillip
- Trams in Melbourne
