= Victorian College for the Deaf =

School in Melbourne, Victoria, Australia

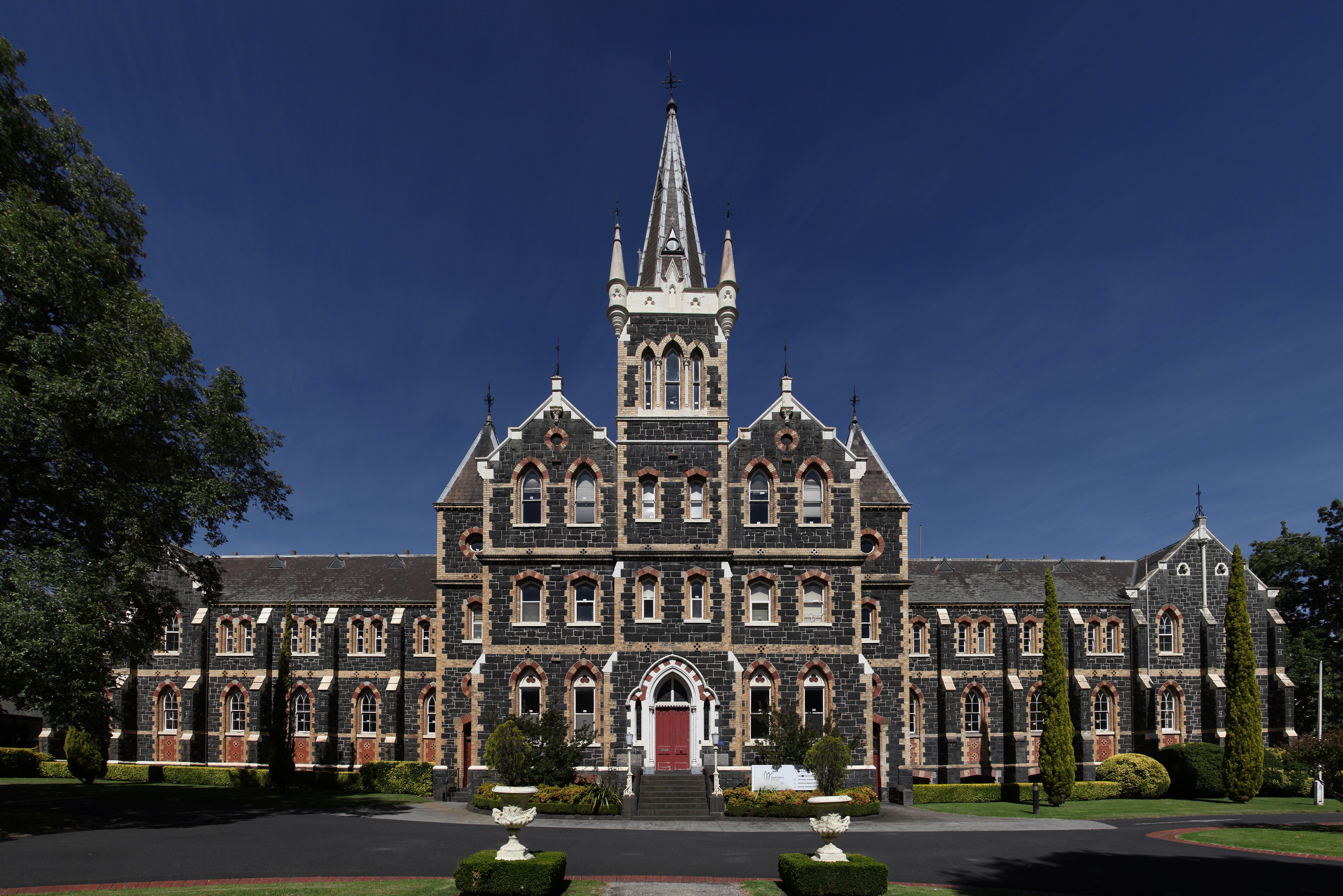

Location
- Melbourne, Victoria; Australia; 37.8498°S 144.9825°E

Information
- Type: Department of Education (Victoria)
- Established: 1860
- Principal: Margaret Tope
- Enrolment: 75
- Colours: Navy & white
- Website: vcd.vic.edu.au

The Victorian College for the Deaf (VCD), located on St Kilda Road in Melbourne, Australia, is Victoria's oldest deaf school, opening in 1860. The Victorian College for the Deaf is Australia's only Prep to Year 12 Specialist in Deaf Education. Education is provided using a bilingual philosophy of teaching through Auslan, the language of the Australian deaf community, and English as the second language. It has a significant role in the history of Australian deaf culture.

== History ==
On 16 February 1859, a letter appeared in the Melbourne Argus, appealing for help for the deaf children of the colony as there were no educational arrangements for these children. Frederick John Rose replied to the series of letters from his residency in Sandhurst (Bendigo) and formed a friendship with the writer Sarah Ann Lewis, whose daughter, Lucy Ann Lewis, became his first pupil.

F.J. Rose was a well-educated deaf man who had come from England in 1852 and had been educated at the Old Kent Road School for the Deaf in London. Rose became deaf at the age of 6 after a bout of Scarlet Fever.

On 12 November 1860 the 'Victorian Deaf and Dumb Institution' was opened by Rose at his residency in Peel Street. Windsor. The school numbers grew quickly within a few years and had to move three times. In 1861 to a cottage on Henry Street, Windsor, in 1862 to a house on Nelson Street, Windsor and thirdly in 1864 to Leal House on Commercial Road, Prahran.

After the 3 moves and with numbers continuing to grow, the Committee realised that it was time for a permanent home and a specially designed building. In 1865 the Government made a grant of land on the corner of St Kilda Road and High Street, Prahran, and the iconic blue-stone building was built and opened in 1866.

It is appropriate that the founder and first headmaster was an educated Deaf man, Rose a role model to many students. If it wasn't for a man dreaming so boldly, thousands of Deaf Victorians would not be the better both academically and socially as the Victorian College for the Deaf continues to be the student hub of the Deaf community.

Rose died on 1 December 1920 at the age of 89. He is buried in St Kilda Cemetery.

Originally named Victorian Deaf and Dumb Institution, the Dumb was dropped from the name in 1949 and significantly was the first institution of its like in the world to drop the word Dumb from its title. From then onwards the school was the Victorian School for Deaf Children. Then in the year of 1995 that name was changed to Victorian College for the Deaf.

=== Names ===
- 1862 – Victorian Deaf and Dumb Institution
- 1949 – Victorian School for Deaf Children (VSDC)
- 1995 – Victorian College for the Deaf (VCD)

== See also ==
- Frederick J Rose
- Deaf Children Australia
