= Cestria =

Cestria may refer to:

- The town of Chester le Street in County Durham, England
- Cestria (Epirus), a town of ancient Epirus
- Cestria (house), a heritage-listed former mansion in Melbourne, Victoria, Australia
- Cestria (Power Rangers), a character in the Power Rangers
- Historical Latin name for Chester, England and the county of Cheshire. (also as Cestriæ)
