= 350 St Kilda Road =

Apartment building in Melbourne, Australia

Coordinates: 37.831137°S 144.970101°E

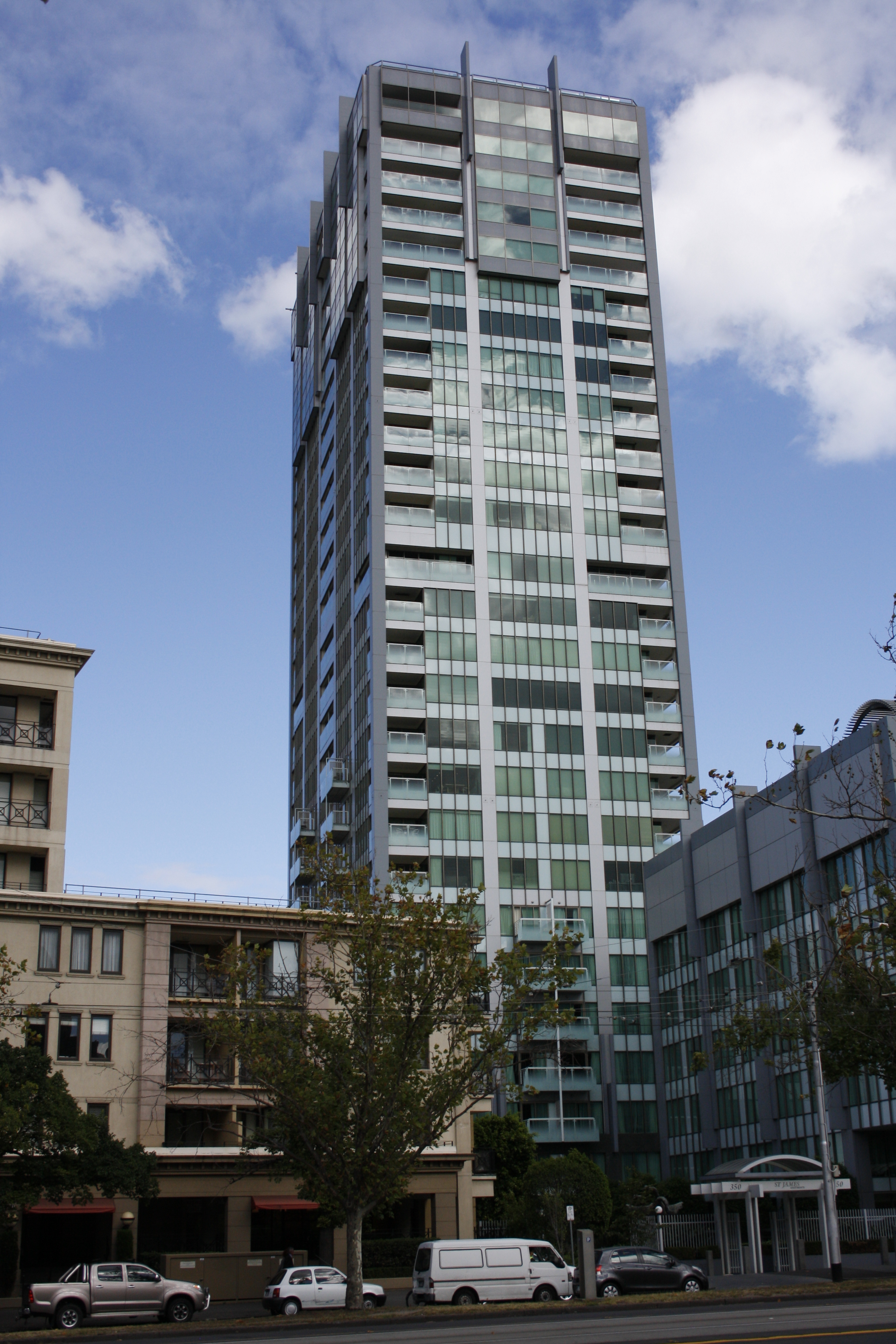
350 St Kilda Road

350 St Kilda Road, currently known as St. James Apartments, is a 120 m high apartment building on St Kilda Road in Melbourne, Australia. It consists of 30 floors including three basement levels.

It was originally built in 1974 for the Department of Defence. The low rise building next door with nine floors (including three basement levels) was also part of the original complex. Around 1,500 staff worked in the buildings.

The tower was the tallest building outside the Central business district of Melbourne when constructed and had unsurpassed views in all directions.

The residential conversion was completed in 1998, and there were later renovations.

== See also ==
- Tall buildings in Melbourne
