= Frederick J Rose =

Australian teacher (1831–1920)

Frederick John Rose (21 September 1831 – 1 December 1920) was the Headmaster-Superintendent of Victorian School for Deaf Children (formerly the Victorian Deaf and Dumb Institution) from 1860 to 1891.

== Biography ==
Born in England in 1831, Rose was profoundly deaf. He travelled to Victoria, Australia, with his brother during the 1850s gold rush, but after no initial success, the brothers worked in construction.

After reading a letter written by the widowed mother of a deaf child that published in Melbourne's The Argus in 1859, Rose took an interest in educational services for disabled children in the colony. At the time, children requiring specialist education were expected to travel to England.

In 1860, Rose began teaching pupils in a small house in Windsor, a suburb of Melbourne, however the number of students continued to grow, causing the location to change several times. By 1866, Rose had collected enough funds to construct a purpose-built facility. The large bluestone was completed in 1867 and still stands on St Kilda Road, Melbourne, currently operated by Deaf Children Australia
