= Anzac railway station =

Railway station in Melbourne, Victoria, Australia

Anzac
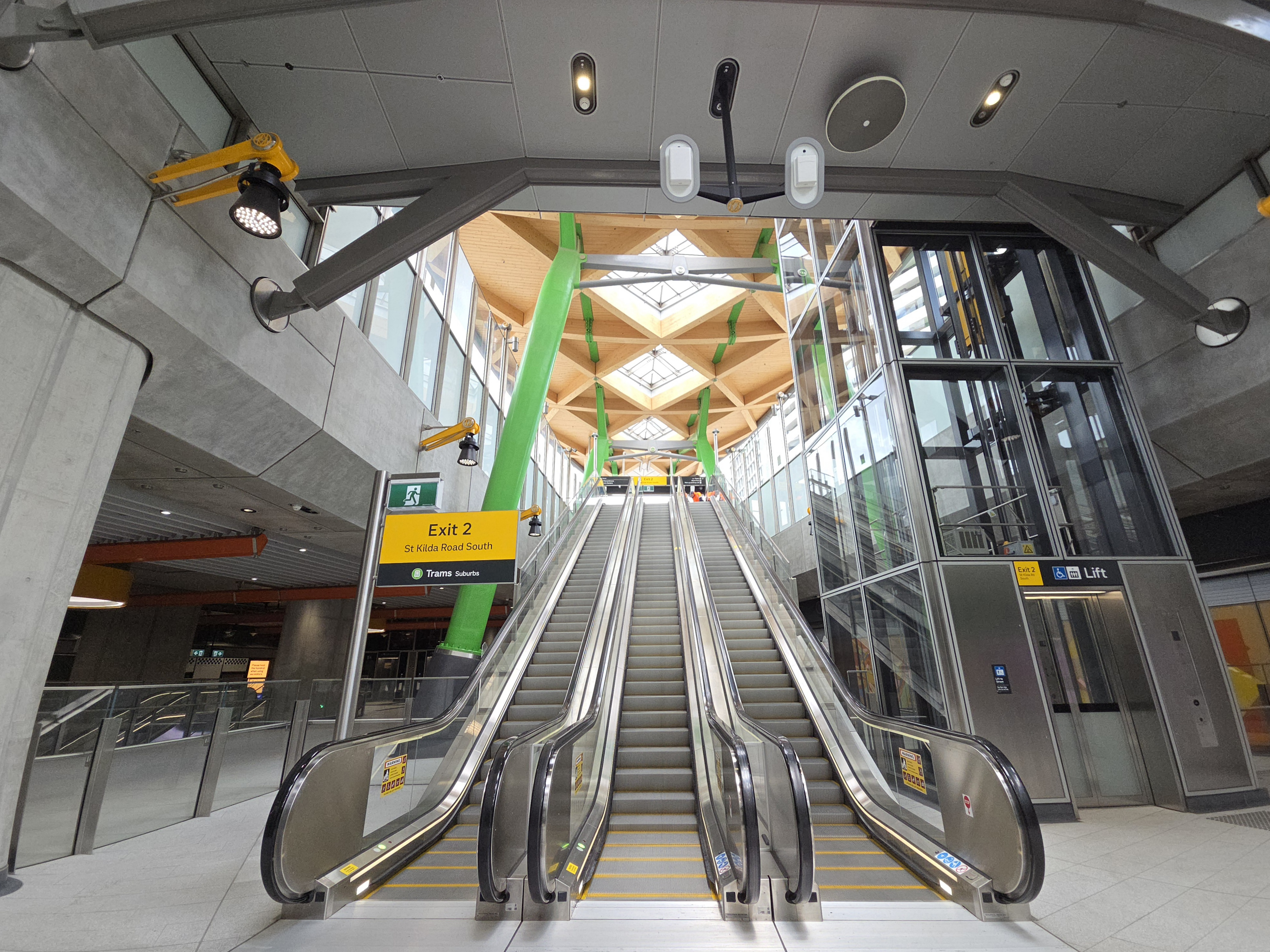
- Concourse of Anzac station, viewed towards the south of St Kilda Road, November 2025

General information
- Location: St Kilda Road; Melbourne, Victoria 3004; City of Melbourne; Australia
- Coordinates: 37°49′59″S 144°58′20″E
- System: PTV commuter rail station
- Owner: VicTrack
- Operator: Metro Trains
- Line: Cranbourne Pakenham
- Distance: 12.34 kilometres from Southern Cross
- Platforms: 2
- Tracks: 2
- Connections: Tram; Bus

Construction
- Structure type: Underground
- Accessible: Yes—step free access

Other information
- Status: Operational, premium station
- Station code: AZC
- Fare zone: Myki zone 1
- Website: Public Transport Victoria

History
- Opened: 30 November 2025; 11 months ago
- Electrified: Yes (1500 V DC overhead)

Services
Preceding station	Metro Trains	Following station
Town Hall towards Watergardens or Sunbury via Metro Tunnel	Cranbourne line	Malvern towards East Pakenham or Cranbourne
Town Hall towards Watergardens or Sunbury via Metro Tunnel	Pakenham line	Malvern towards East Pakenham or Cranbourne
Track layout
Location

Anzac railway station is an underground railway station operated by Metro Trains Melbourne on the Cranbourne and Pakenham lines, part of the Melbourne rail network. It serves the southern end of the Melbourne city centre and South Melbourne in Melbourne, Victoria, Australia.

Opened as part of the Metro Tunnel project, Anzac is an underground premium station, featuring an island platform with two platforms. The station connects directly to the Anzac tram interchange at street level. Major construction commenced in April 2018, and was completed in September 2024. The station opened on 30 November 2025, along with the rest of the Metro Tunnel.

Originally announced under the working title of Domain, after the nearby Kings Domain, following a naming competition the station was named Anzac for the nearby Shrine of Remembrance and in honour of the Anzac spirit of "service and sacrifice". Construction on the station commenced in 2018 using the cut-and-cover method. The station provides a direct platform transfer to services on the busy tram corridor along St Kilda Road and also provides access to the nearby Royal Botanic Gardens and Albert Park.

Upon opening, Anzac became the southernmost underground railway station in the world.

== Location ==
Anzac station is located beneath St Kilda Road at the intersection with Domain Road and Albert Road, near the Shrine of Remembrance. It features four entrances: two on the tram stop in the St Kilda Road median, one on Domain Road, and one on Albert Road.

== Anzac precinct ==
The station also features the first platform-to-platform connection between trains and trams in Melbourne, as half of all passengers are expected to interchange between the two modes of transport. The Anzac Station tram stop opened to passengers on 19 December 2022, replacing the Domain Interchange which formerly existed on the same site prior to Metro Tunnel construction. The train station underneath remained under construction.

The station entrance features a large wooden canopy designed by RSHP, Hassell and Weston Williamson.

== Station layout ==
S	Street level	Entrances/Exits, Tram interchange
C	Concourse	Customer Service, Retail
P Platforms	Platform 1	Cranbourne line towards Sunbury (Town Hall) → Pakenham line towards Sunbury (Town Hall) →
P Platforms	Island platform, doors will open on the right
P Platforms	Platform 2	← Cranbourne line towards Cranbourne (Malvern) ← Pakenham line towards Pakenham (Malvern)

== Transport links ==
Yarra Trams operates eight tram routes via St Kilda Rd:

- : Melbourne University – Malvern East
- : Melbourne University – Malvern
- : Moreland – Glen Iris
- : Melbourne University – Kew
- : West Coburg – Toorak
- : Melbourne University – Brighton East
- : Melbourne University – Carnegie
- : Melbourne University – Camberwell

Kinetic Melbourne operates one bus route via Anzac station, under contract to Public Transport Victoria:

- 604 : to Elsternwick station

CDC Melbourne operates one bus route via Anzac Station, under contract to Public Transport Victoria:

- 605 : Gardenvale – Melbourne CBD (Queen Street)

== Gallery ==
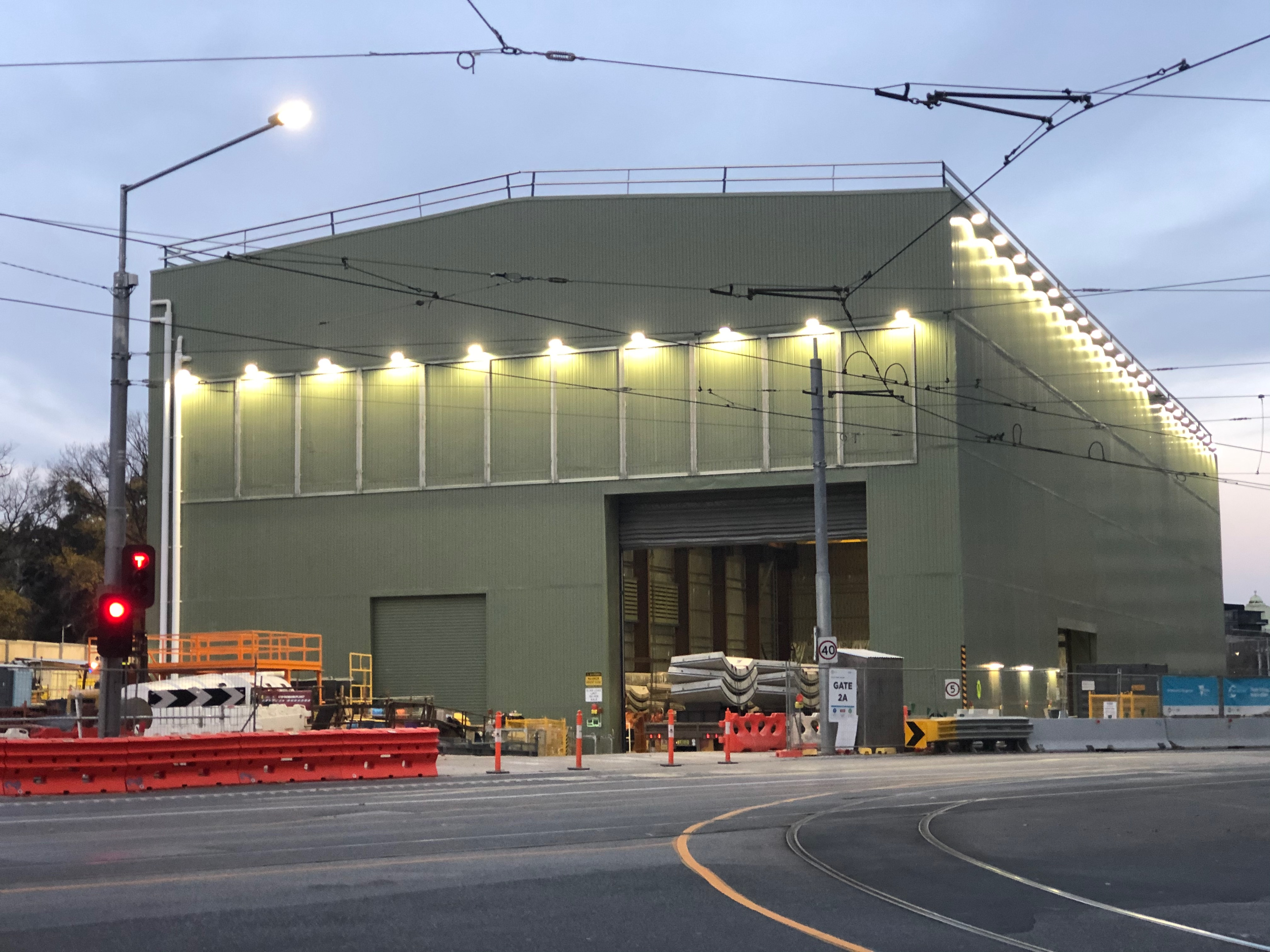
Acoustic shed on St Kilda Road to mask excavation noise during construction of Anzac station,
June 2020

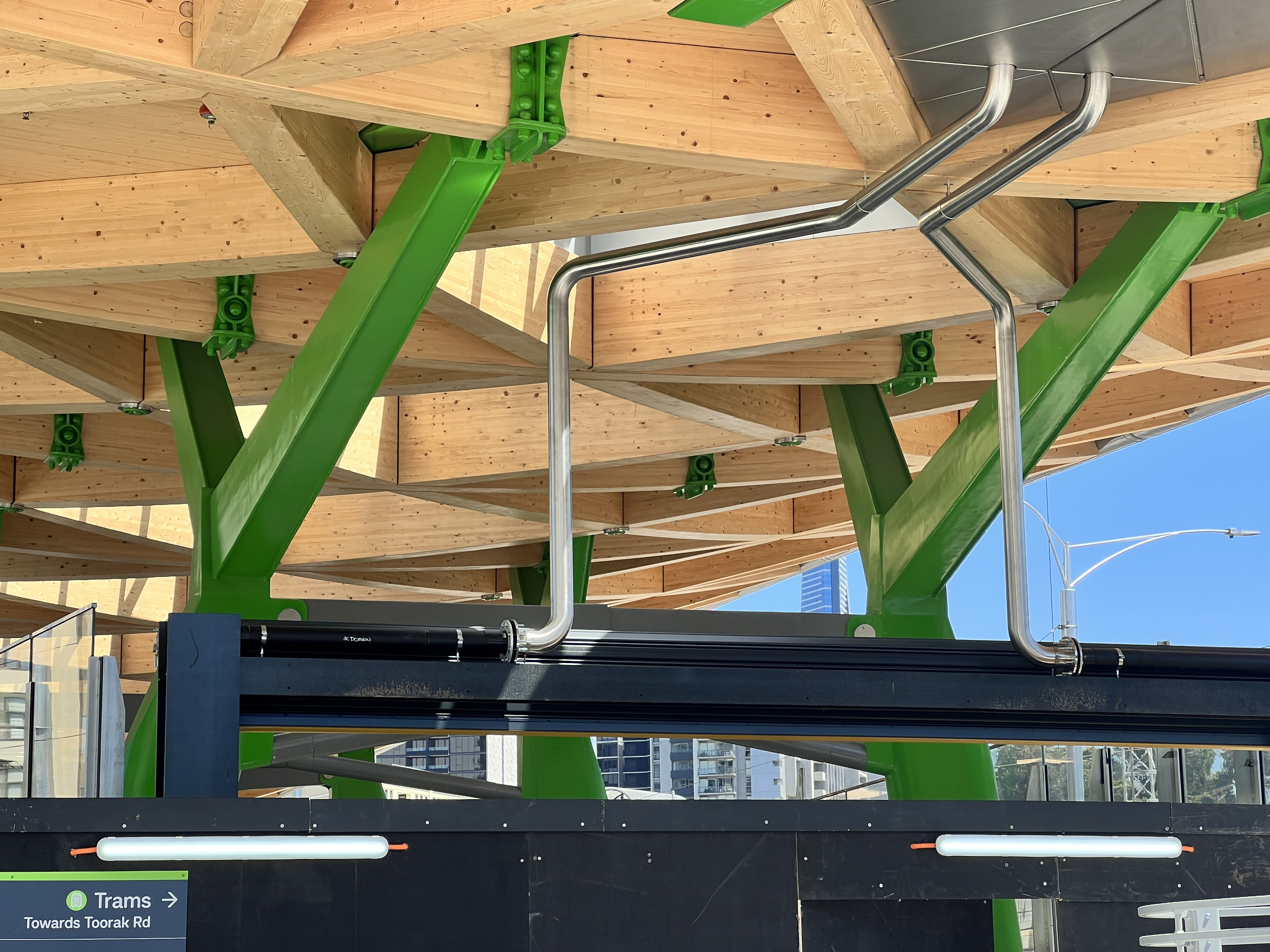
Detail of the wooden Anzac station entrance canopy during construction, December 2022

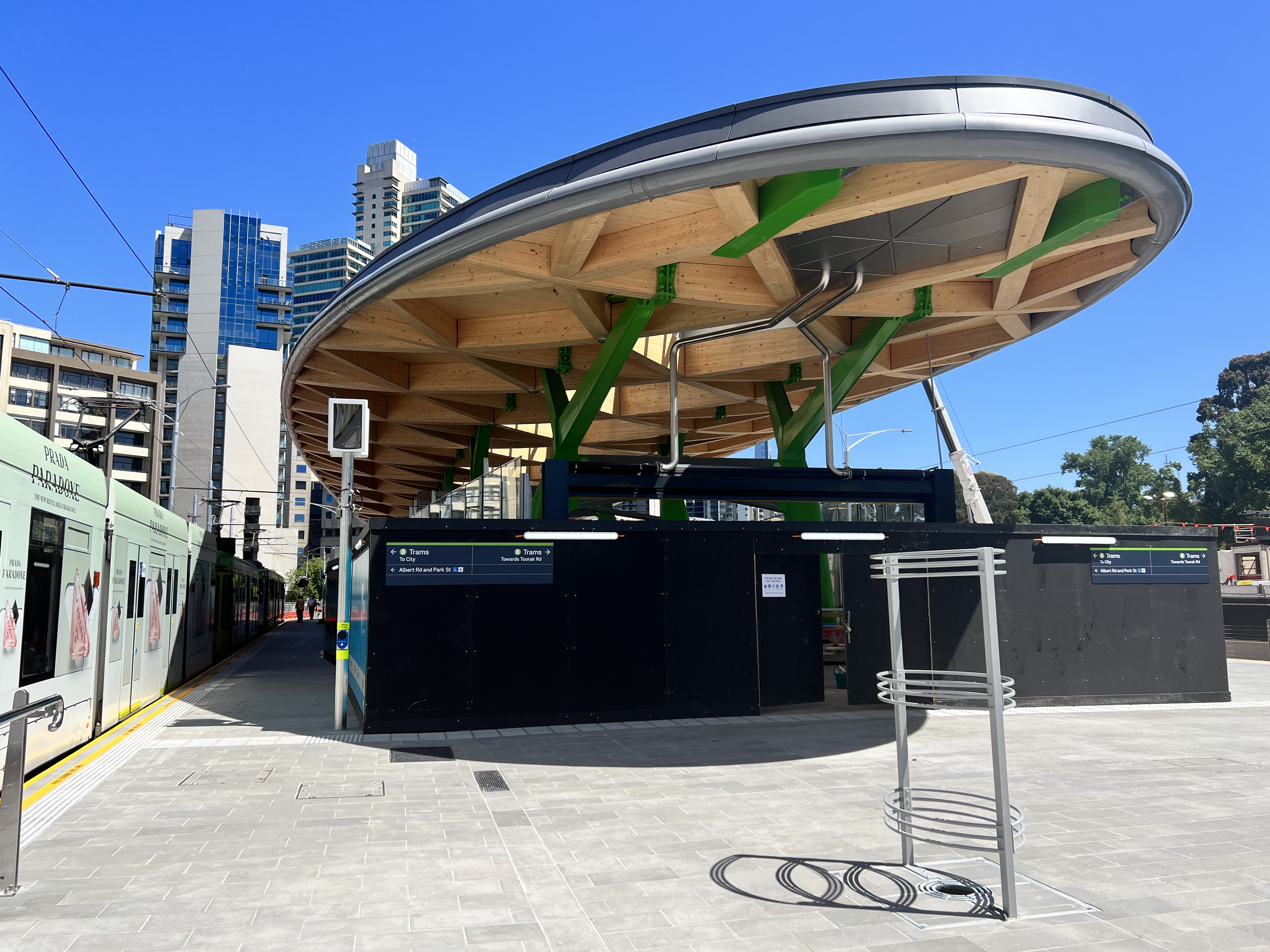
Anzac station entrance under construction viewing from Anzac Station Interchange Tram stop, December 2022

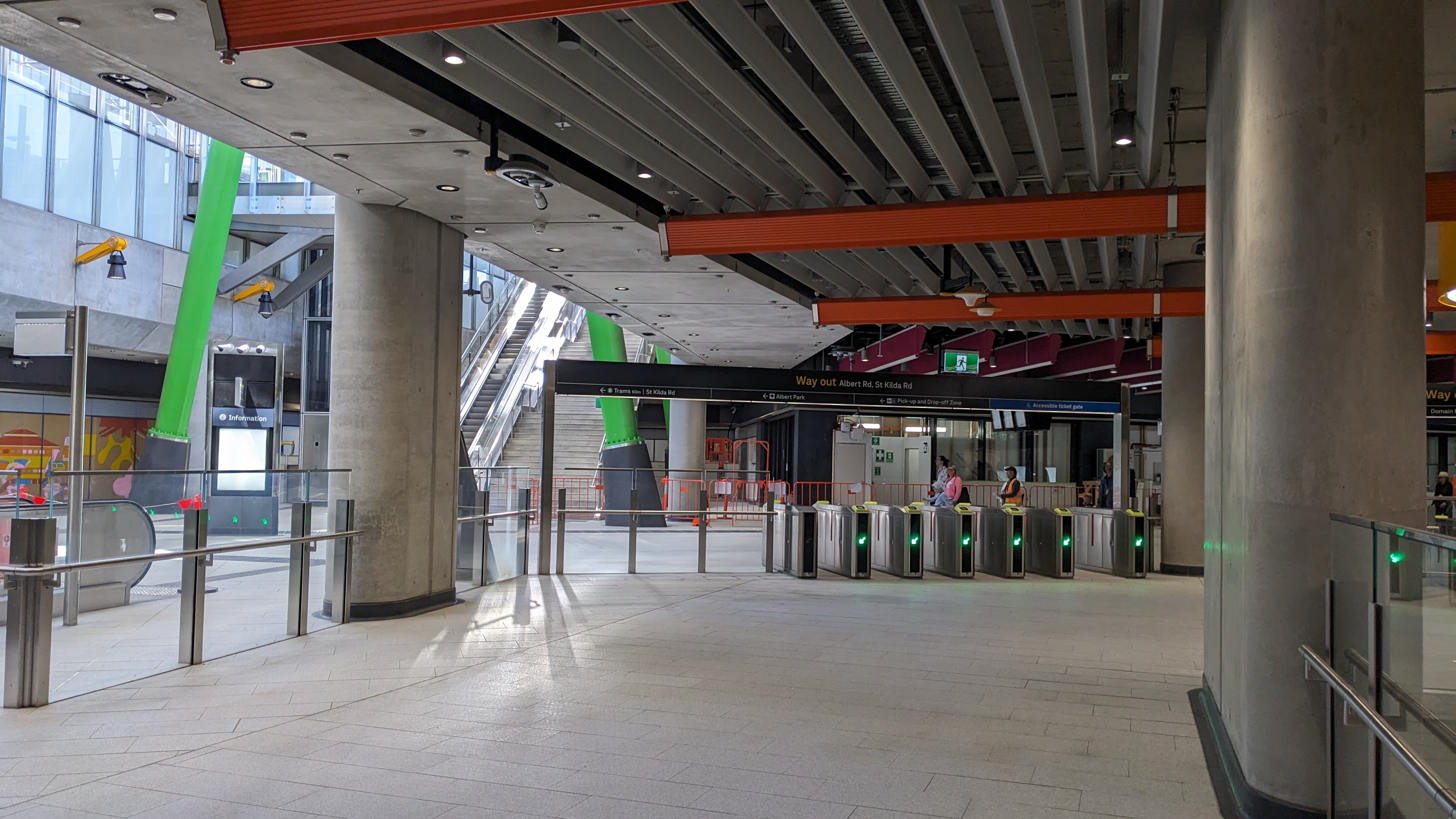
Centre of the main concourse in October 2024

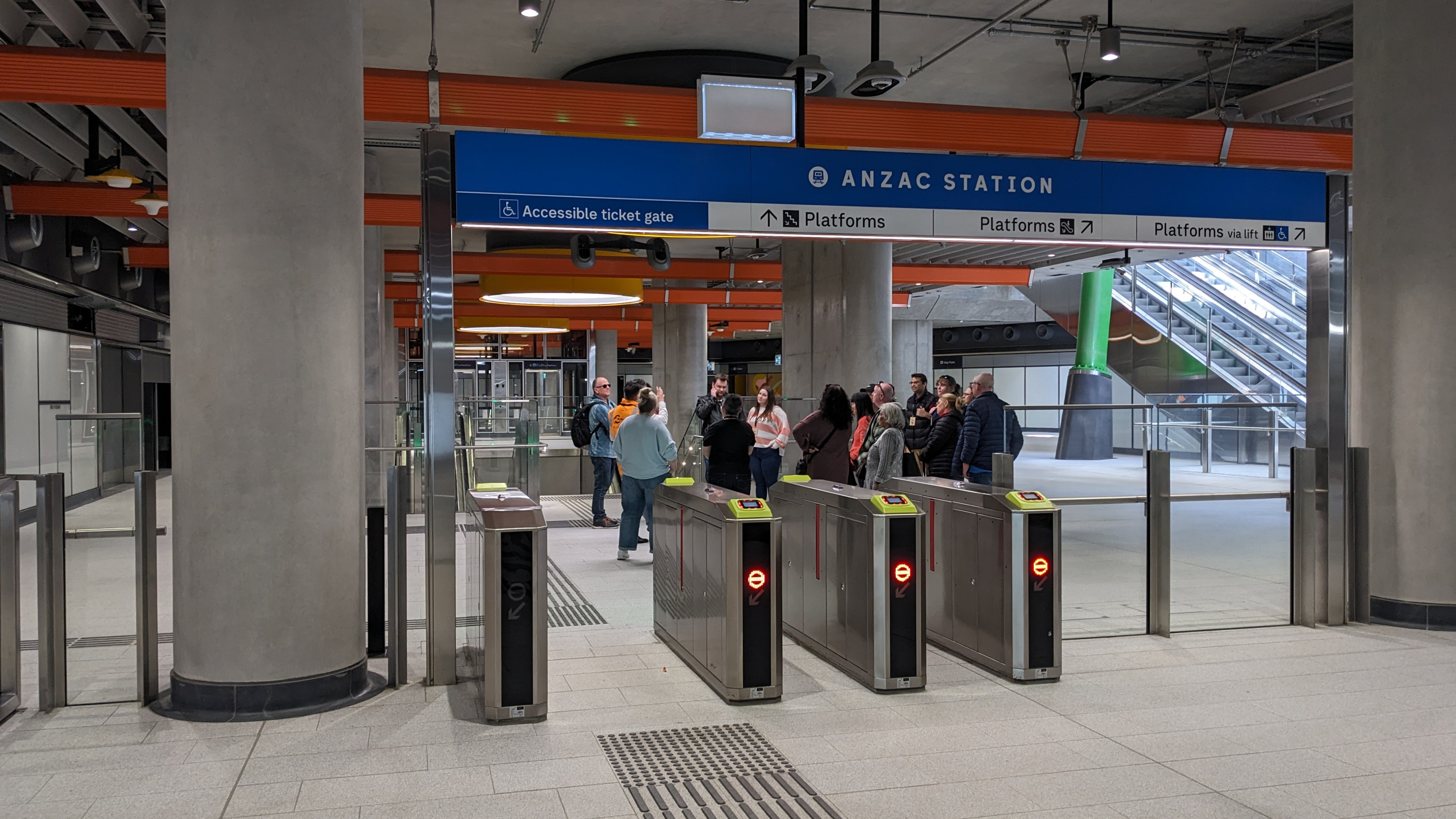
Main ticket barriers in the concourse in October 2024

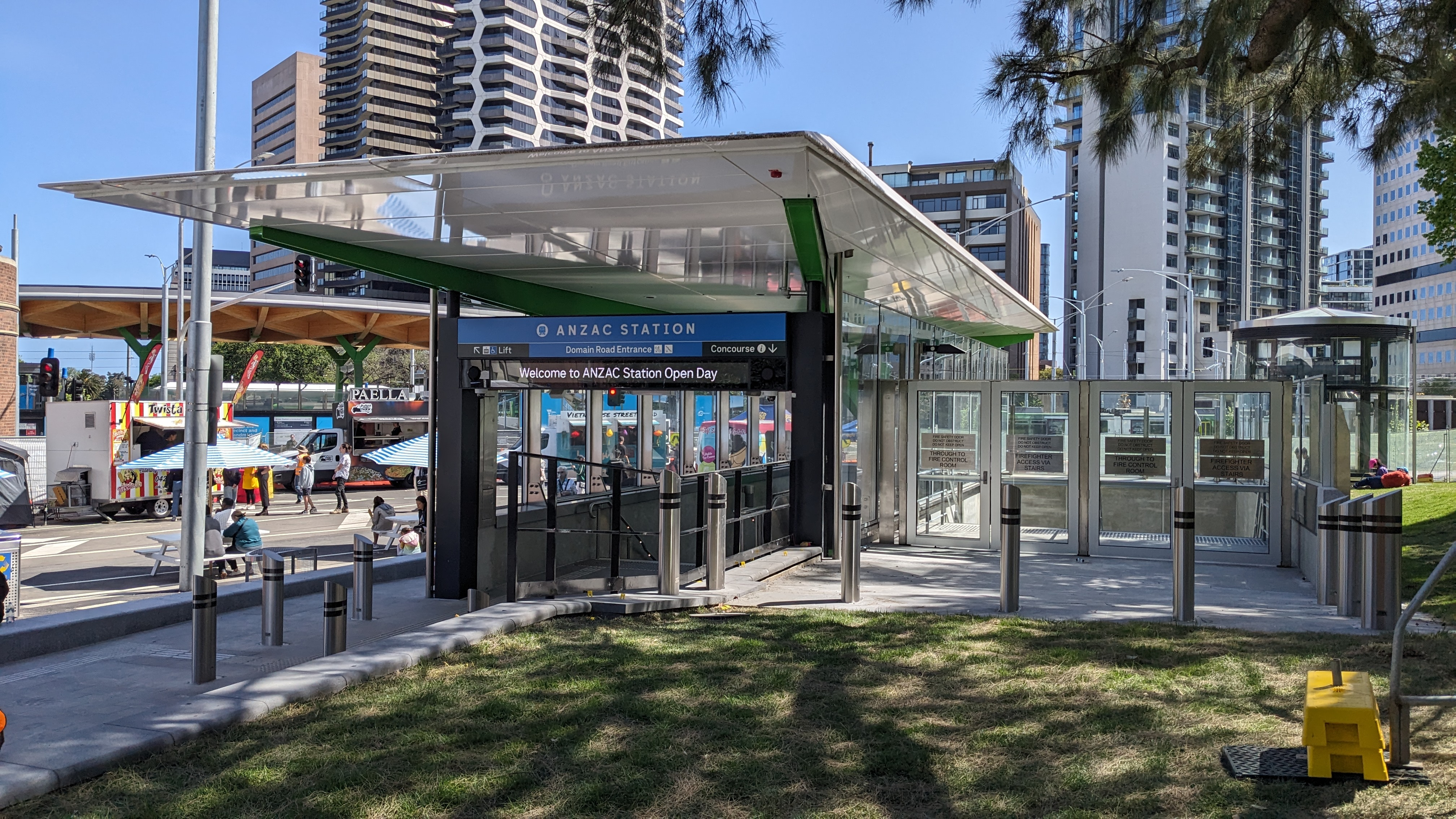
Domain Road Entrance to Anzac Station

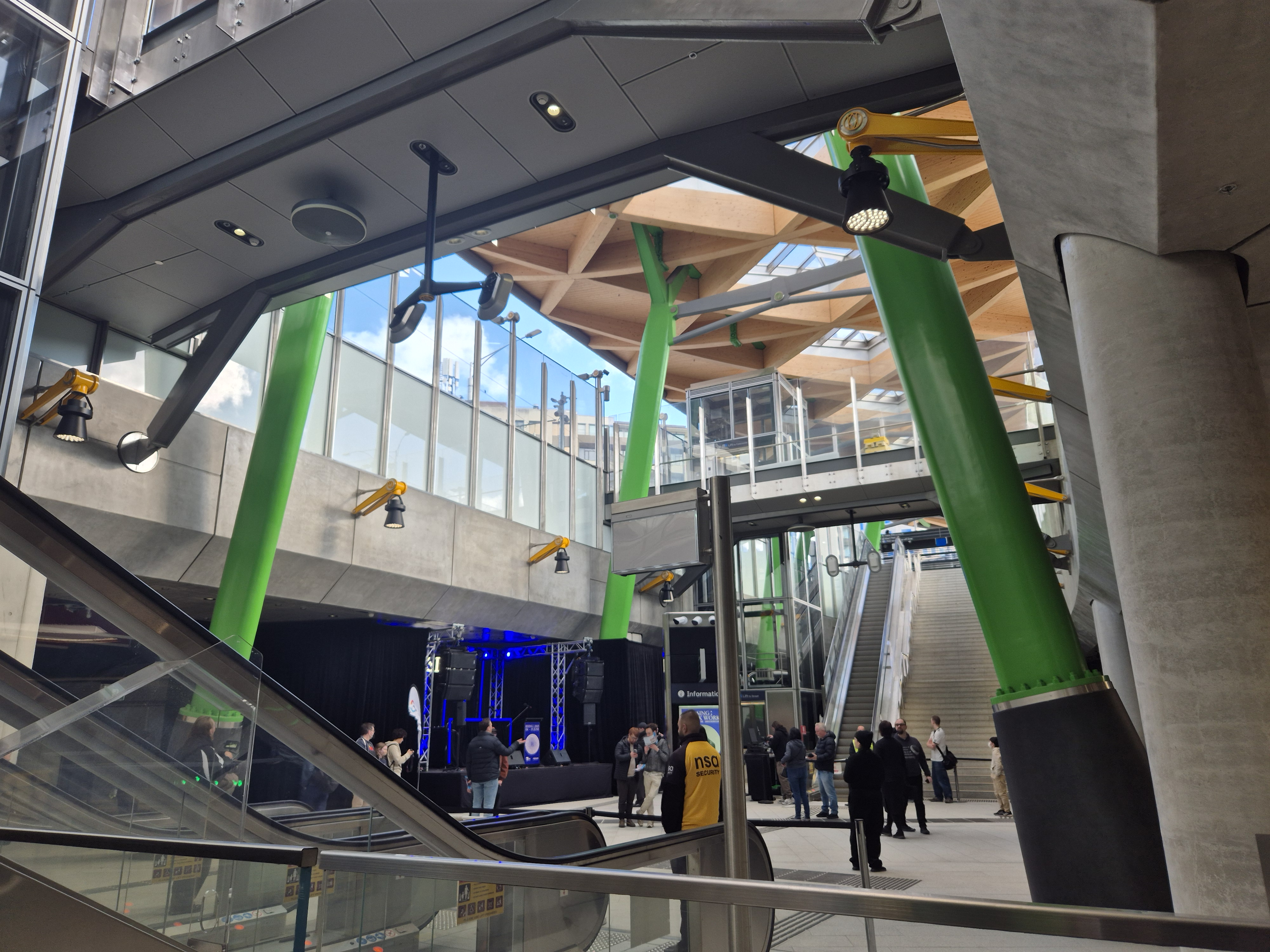
A view from the concourse looking up towards the canopy

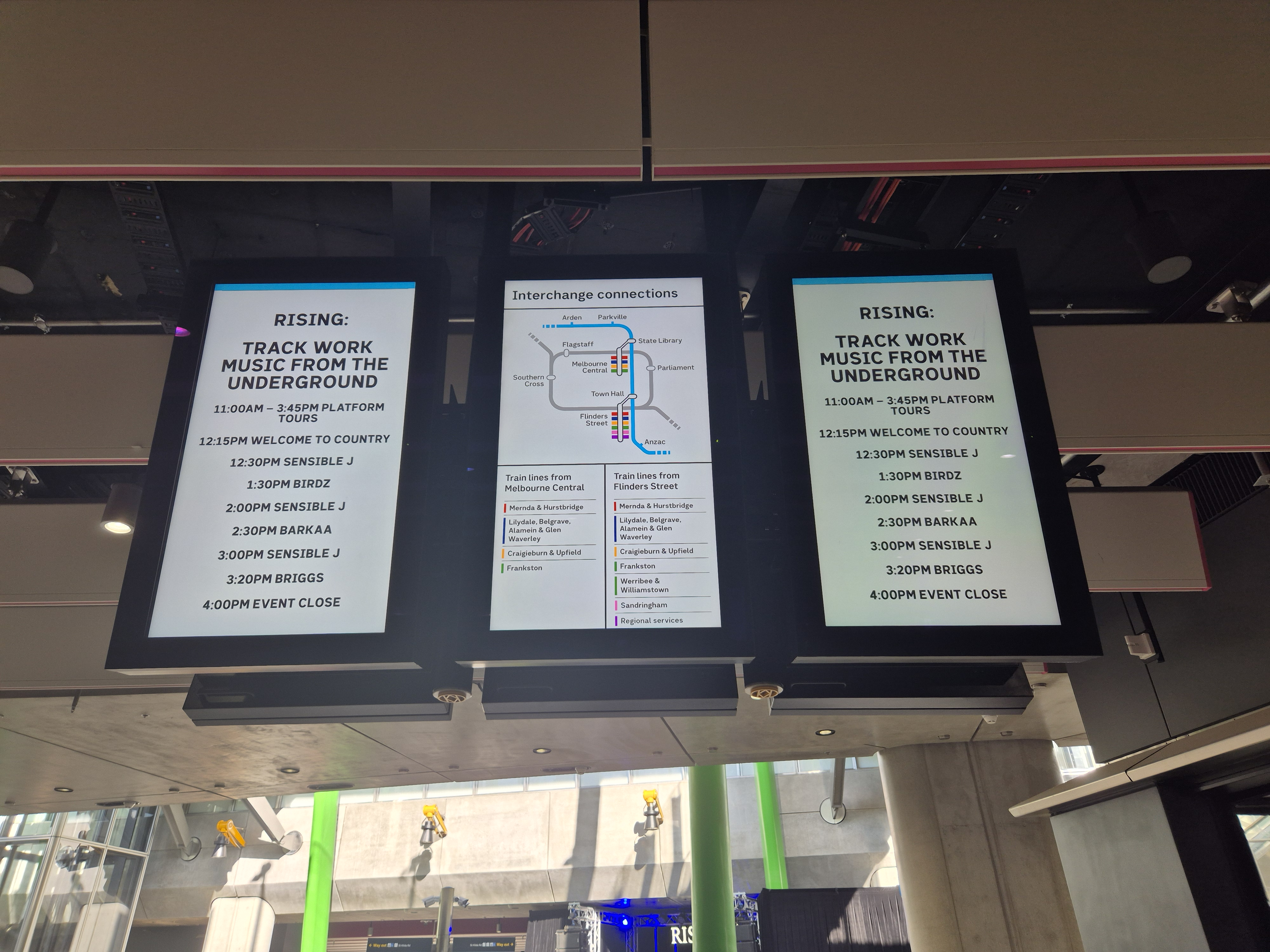
Passenger Information Displays showing Interchange Connections as well as information about the RISING Trackwork concert
