= Priory Ladies' School Boarding House =

Heritage-listed former school building, now house, in Melbourne, Victoria, Australia

- Location of the former school building in Greater Metropolitan Melbourne
- Alternative names: The Priory

General information
- Status: Completed
- Type: School boarding house (1890–1913); House
- Architectural style: Federation American Romanesque; Richardsonian Romanesque
- Location: 61 Alma Road, St Kilda, City of Port Phillip, Melbourne, Victoria, Australia
- Coordinates: 37°51′40″S 144°59′19″E
- Completed: 1890; 136 years ago
- Cost: £2,126
- Client: Miss Hatchell Brown

Technical details
- Material: Red bricks; slate; timber; cast iron

Design and construction
- Architect: Edward George Kilburn
- Architecture firm: Ellerker and Kilburn
- Main contractor: Long and Mason

Victorian Heritage Register
- Official name: Former Priory Ladies School
- Type: Registered place
- Designated: 22 February 1989
- Reference no.: VHR H0726
- Heritage overlay no.: HO20
- Categories: Education; Residential buildings (private); Transient Accommodation

Register of the National Estate
- Official name: Residence, 61 Alma Road
- Type: Defunct register
- Designated: 30 June 1992
- Reference no.: 15660

The Priory Ladies' School Boarding House is a former boarding house school building, now house, called The Priory, located at 61 Alma Road in St Kilda, in the City of Port Phillip, in the inner eastern suburbs of Melbourne, Victoria, Australia.

Built in 1890 on the traditional lands of the Wurundjeri people, the house was added to the Victorian Heritage Register on 22 February 1989 in recognition of its historical and architectural significance; and was also added to non-statutory lists by the Victorian branch of the National Trust on 20 September 1984 and the now defunct Register of the National Estate on 30 June 1992.

== History ==
=== School building ===
The Priory Ladies' School was one of three secular private girls' schools in St Kilda. Established on 8 February 1887, the school closed in December 1913. Founded by Miss Hatchell Brown, a teacher who had previously been one of the senior staff at the private girls' school at Oberwyl in St Kilda, she acquired the Alma Road Grammar School located in two adjacent houses on Alma Road. She knocked down one of the houses and engaged Edward George Kilburn of the firm, Ellerker and Kilburn, architects, to design a boarding house for twenty boarders at the day and boarding school, plus as Miss Brown's residence. Long and Mason of Coburg were the builders, their tender of £2,126 was accepted in March 1890. Construction was completed by July 1890.

Kilburn had visited Europe and the United States in 1889 and was influenced greatly by the architectural developments there. The American Romanesque style – used interchangeably with the term Richardsonian Romanesque, a Romanesque Revivalist style – readily lent itself to picturesque effects and additionally was supposed by contemporary Australian journals such as the Building and Engineering Journal to be suited to the requirements of the Australian climate. After completing the school boarding house, Kilburn designed Cestria in nearby Hawthorn, on Glenferie Road, also completed in the American Romanesque style, completed in 1891.

Following the fallout from the Melbourne land boom, enrolments at the school plummeted from 66 to just 27 in 1893 and the school eventually closed in December 1913. The former school building, located in the adjacent house called Lansmere, was later demolished.

=== House ===
In 1983, The Priory was purchased as a family home by Kenneth Rowell AM (1920–1999). A costume designer for theatre and opera, Rowell was awarded a British Council scholarship to England in 1950 and worked there over the next four decades on more than 140 ballet, opera and theatre productions, occasionally working collaboratively with the Australian Ballet and Opera Australia. He returned to Australia in 1982 as the Artist-in-Residence at The University of Melbourne and settled in The Priory.

== Description ==
The two-storey building is in face brickwork of two colours with cement dressings. Evidently the roof was originally slate. Windows are timber-framed and double hung. Features of the design externally are the huge arched windows to the principal room downstairs, the cyclopean rustication, the verandah piers, squat window pilasters and the very unusual chimney stacks. Almost all of the detailing bears very little similarity to contemporary architectural practice in Victoria. However, the placing of windows in chimney breasts is not uncommon in large houses built during the 1880s. Internally the stair mouldings and their arrangement are unusual, as are the mantelpieces.

== See also ==
- Architecture of Melbourne
- List of places on the Victorian Heritage Register in the City of Port Phillip
- Cestria (house)
