= St Kilda Street Bridge =

Heritage-listed bridge in Melbourne, Victoria, Australia

- Coordinates: 37°53′09″S 144°59′30″E
- Carries: St Kilda Street
- Crosses: Elwood Canal /; Elster Creek
- Locale: Melbourne, Victoria, Australia
- Begins: Elwood, City of Port Phillip
- Ends: Brighton, City of Bayside
- Official name: Elwood Canal Bridge
- Owner: VicRoads

Characteristics
- Design: T–girder road bridge
- Material: Reinforced concrete
- Total length: 30.5 m (100 ft)
- Width: 10.7 m (35 ft)
- Longest span: 6.1 m (20 ft)
- No. of spans: 5
- Piers in water: 4
- No. of lanes: 2, plus pedestrian deck

History
- Designer: John Monash
- Constructed by: Reinforced Concrete & Monier Pipe Construction Co
- Construction end: 1905; 121 years ago
- Construction cost: £1,500

Victorian Heritage Register
- Official name: St Kilda Street Bridge
- Type: Registered place
- Designated: undated (Note: Prior to 2015, based on the nomination report for an Engineering Heritage Marker by Engineers Australia.)
- Reference no.: H2080
- Heritage overlay nos.: HO461; HO770
- Category: Transport – Road

Location
- Interactive map of St Kilda Street Bridge

The St Kilda Street Bridge is a road bridge that carries St Kilda Street across the Elwood Canal, that drains the Elster Creek, located between Elwood, in the City of Port Phillip and Brighton, in the City of Bayside, in the eastern suburbs of Melbourne, in Victoria, Australia. The reinforced concrete T–girder road bridge was designed and constructed in 1905 by civil engineer John Monash of the Reinforced Concrete & Monier Pipe Construction Company.

Built on the traditional lands of the Bunurong people, the bridge was added to the Victorian Heritage Register in recognition of its scientific (technical) and historical significance; and was also added to a non-statutory list by the Victorian branch of the National Trust on 17 May 2004. In April 2015, the bridge was awarded an Engineering Heritage Marker by Engineers Australia.

== History ==
The St Kilda Street Bridge is the oldest extant reinforced concrete beam bridge in Victoria and possibly Australia. It marks a watershed in the use of reinforced concrete in not only civil construction but also in the construction of buildings. Soon after the construction of this bridge, Monash was utilising the technology in the construction of two warehouses in Oliver Lane, Melbourne in 1906–1907.

Prior to these works, Monash had, to varying degrees of success, been building concrete arch bridges using the Monier patent system with his then business partner J. T. N. Anderson. The most successful of these is the Anderson Street Bridge over the Yarra, completed in 1899.

Reinforced concrete construction theory was in its infancy in the late 19th and early 20th centuries and the St Kilda Street Bridge and the Stawell Street Bridge in Ballarat, built in 1904, represent pioneering developments by Monash into new engineering methods and material use. Unfortunately the Stawell Street Bridge was less than successful and the bridge required extra support structure. It was demolished after several years.

Due to the failure of the Stawell Street Bridge, Monash returned to The University of Melbourne to conduct experiments into the behaviour of reinforced concrete girder construction. From the results of these tests, which he published in the Journal of the Victorian Institute of Engineers, Monash was able to revise the method for the design of reinforced concrete construction such that the St Kilda Street Bridge of 1905 was successful. This bridge is a most important evolutionary step in the development of reinforced concrete technology. Monash’s calculations for the design of the St Kilda Street bridge still exist.

The St Kilda Street bridge was designed as part of the Elwood Canal works which were built to drain the Elster Creek and the swampy land in the Elwood and Elsternwick areas. The Elwood Canal project provided Monash with the opportunity to further develop reinforced concrete beam technology. The low-lying land and shallow canals of the project required low flat bridges which could not easily be provided by arch bridges which required deep embankments or a greater height of construction than a flat bridge. Monash was able to convince Carlos Catani, then the Chief Engineer of the Victorian Public Works Department, of the suitability of reinforced concrete beam construction for bridges in the Elwood canal project despite their unproven use. Between 1905 and 1907 Monash's Reinforced Concrete & Monier Pipe Construction Co. built seven bridges in the Elwood area, six of these crossed the Elwood Canal; and by 1915, Monash’s firm had built approximately seventy reinforced concrete bridges in Victoria.

After the success of the St Kilda Street Bridge, Monash always advocated the adoption of the T-girder in preference to the arch, and this eventually came to be the standard form for most Victorian road bridges.

John (later Sir John) Monash was an important figure as a civil engineer, being a leader in the in the field of reinforced concrete. During the World War I Monash rose to the rank of Major General eventually commanding all five Australian divisions on the Western Front. At various times he also commanded a British Division, two Canadian, and two American Divisions. Amongst other major military awards he was knighted in August 1918 on the field of battle by King George V. After the war he served as the General Manager of the Victorian State Electricity Commission.

== Description ==
The bridge is a five-span reinforced concrete bridge that is 30.5 metres (100 ft) long and 10.7 metres (35 ft) wide, inclusive of a 1.7-metre-wide (5.6 ft) footpath. The substructure is constructed from 48 columns arranged in six rows (two abutments and four piers) of eight columns. The eight concrete girders are 260 millimetres (10 in) wide and 480 millimetres (19 in) deep, orientated in the direction of the span of the bridge. No transverse girders or column headstocks have been provided on the bridge. The deck comprises a 127-millimetre-thick (5 in) slab spanning transversely between girders. No bearings have been provided and the deck slab has been cast integral with the beams and columns.

== See also ==
- Architecture of Melbourne
- List of places on the Victorian Heritage Register in the City of Bayside
- List of places on the Victorian Heritage Register in the City of Port Phillip
