= List of places on the Victorian Heritage Register in the City of Melbourne =

This is a list of places on the Victorian Heritage Register in the City of Melbourne in Victoria, Australia. The Victorian Heritage Register is maintained by the Heritage Council of Victoria.

The Victorian Heritage Register, as of 2026, listed the following 415 state-registered places within the City of Melbourne:

Place name	Place #	Location	Suburb	Co-ordinates	Built	State registered	Photo
CSL collection (Note: Also listed on the VHR in the City of Hobsons Bay and the City of Merri-bek.)	H2422	11 Nicholson St	Carlton	37°48′12″S 144°58′18″E	1983	20 April 2023	
Jennerian Building	H1794	45 Poplar Rd	Parkville		1904	22 April 1999	
Tram shelter	H1870	Cnr MacArthur St and St Andrews Pl	East Melbourne	37°48′42″S 144°58′30″E	1917	9 March 2000	
Tram shelters (Note: Two tram shelters located at the same intersection. One is located in the City of Melbourne; the other is located in the City of Port Phillip, on the corner of St Kilda Rd and Lorne St.)	H1868	Cnr St Kilda Rd and High St	Melbourne	37°51′01″S 144°58′51″E	1927	9 March 2000	
Yule House	H2233	309-311 Little Collins Street	Melbourne		1932	11 February 2010	
