= Domain Interchange =

Former tram stop in Melbourne, Victoria, Australia

Coordinates: 37.832677°S 144.972085°E

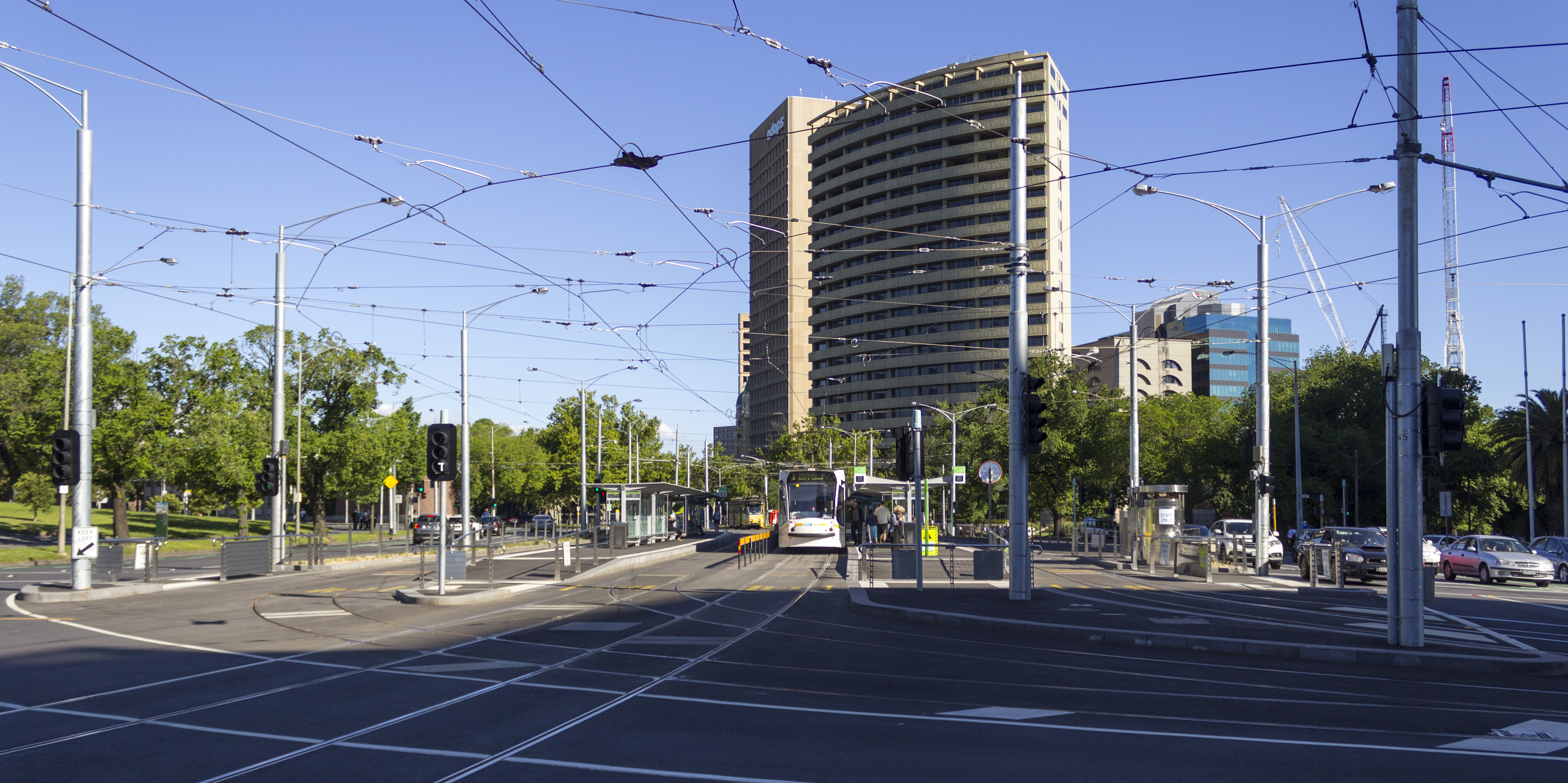
- Southbound view of the interchange stop, November 2013

General information
- Location: St Kilda Road, Melbourne; Australia
- Owner: VicTrack
- Operator: Yarra Trams
- Platforms: 2 island platforms
- Tracks: 4

Construction
- Accessible: Yes

History
- Opened: 1889
- Closed: 5 April 2018
- Rebuilt: 17 November 1986; 12 April 2013

Services
3/3a, 5, 6, 16, 58, 64, 67, 72
Location

Domain Interchange was a major interchange on the Melbourne tram system. It featured two island platforms with four tracks, and had dedicated turning tracks and through tracks. It was located on St Kilda Road between Domain Road and Park Street, adjacent to Kings Domain, and was one of the busiest interchanges on the system, being used by eight tram routes. A shelter built in 1986 was replaced when the stop was rebuilt in 2013.

The stop and interchange was demolished in April 2018, to facilitate the construction of the underground Anzac railway station as part of the Melbourne Metro Rail Project. Anzac Station tram stop opened in December 2022 to the south of the former Domain Interchange site.

== History ==
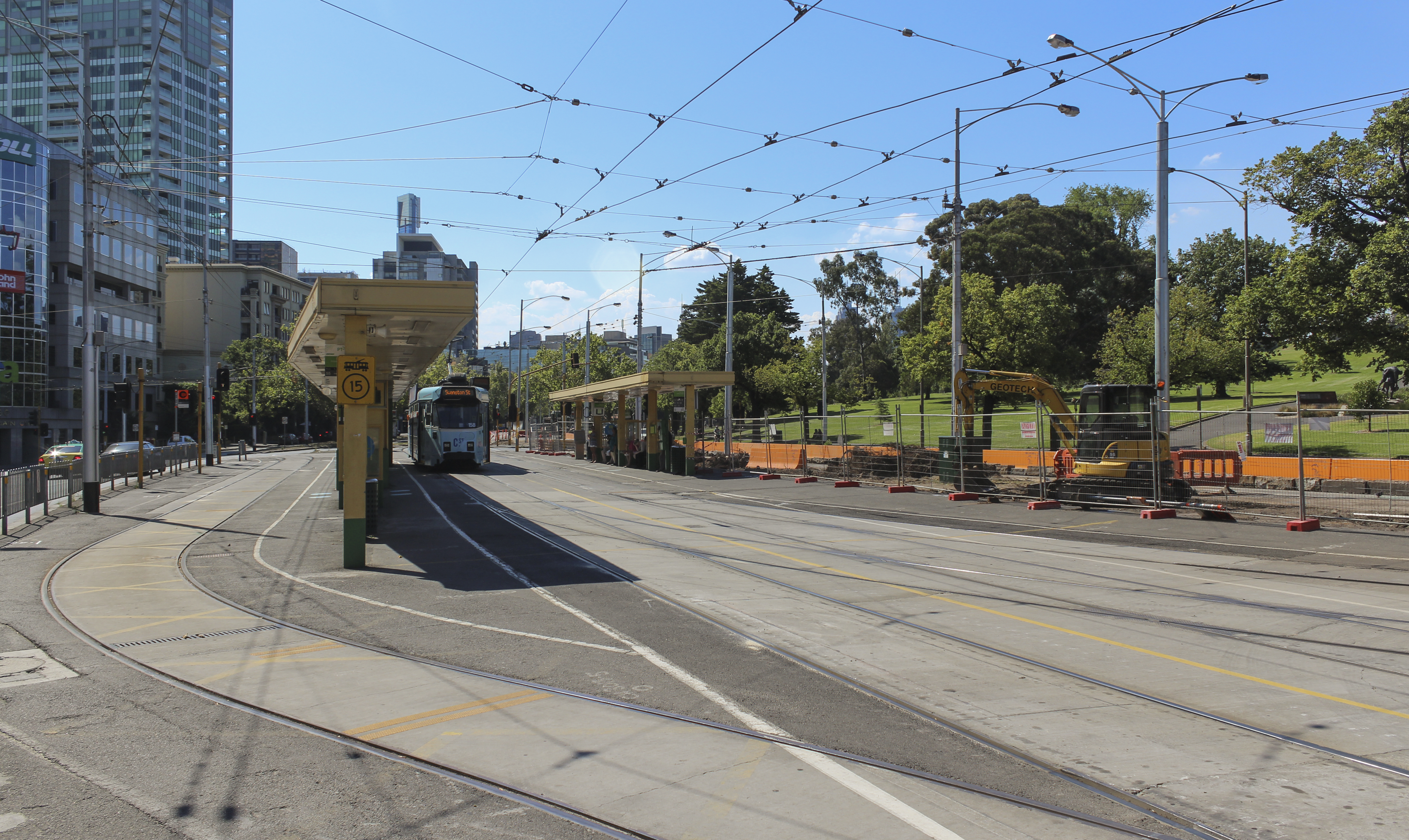
Northbound view before the redevelopment in February 2013

The junction now known as Domain Interchange was opened during the cable era in 1889. It was the connection between the Brighton Road – Queensberry Street line and the newly opened Toorak line which left St Kilda Road to travel along Domain Road; both lines traversed Swanston Street and St Kilda Road. From 1925 to 1927 these two cable lines were converted to electric traction.

In preparation for the electrification of St Kilda Road, a new depot and tracks were constructed, this brought a new line to Domain Junction, along Park Street and Hanna Street, which opened in 1925. It served as a means of diverting trams around the works on St Kilda Road without necessitating the construction of temporary track, and connected with the existing Sturt Street line. It would also serve as the first, and primary connection between Hanna Street depot and St Kilda Road; the other being Sturt Street, which followed early in 1926. The Toorak cable tram line was converted to electric traction following the completion of St Kilda Road's conversion.

On 17 November 1986 the stop was reopened after being rebuilt, with shelters and a third track added to allow route 55 trams to terminate without inhibiting through services.

During the 2006 Commonwealth Games temporary changes were made to the tram network. Among these changes, routes 3 and 5 were through-routed to West Coburg through Domain Interchange, becoming routes 53 and 55 respectively for the duration of the games.

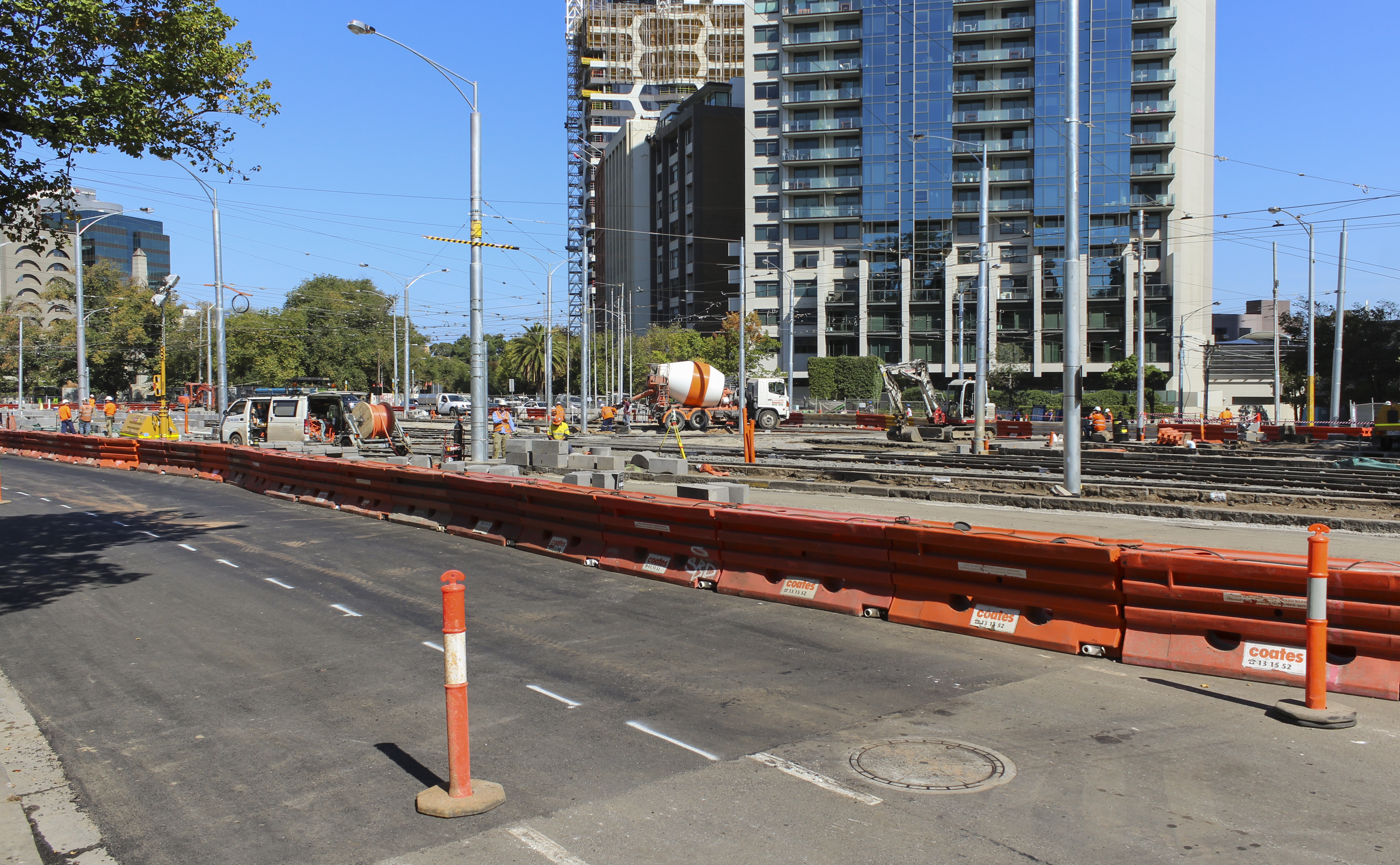
Domain Interchange during redevelopment April 2013

Domain Interchange was rebuilt over the Easter 2013 long weekend.

The new interchange had two island platforms that provide accessible entry to low-floor trams, four tracks, and created new bicycle lanes in the part of St Kilda Road surrounding the interchange. The redevelopment was delivered by Coleman Rail, with design by GHD Group. The track arrangement gave dedicated tracks to route 55 trams from Park Street to terminate, and southbound 8 trams to turn left in Toorak Road, without impacting other routes, who continue through the middle tracks.

Preparatory works began in February, with major construction spanning from the Easter break of 2013. The commencement of major works necessitated the full closure of St Kilda Road, with trams terminating either side of the interchange, and passengers walking around the works site to continue their journey. Major works commenced on 29 March with a full closure of the intersection, St Kilda Road opening two lanes on 3 April, and partial road closures continuing for the duration of the works. The completed interchange opened on the morning of 12 April 2013.

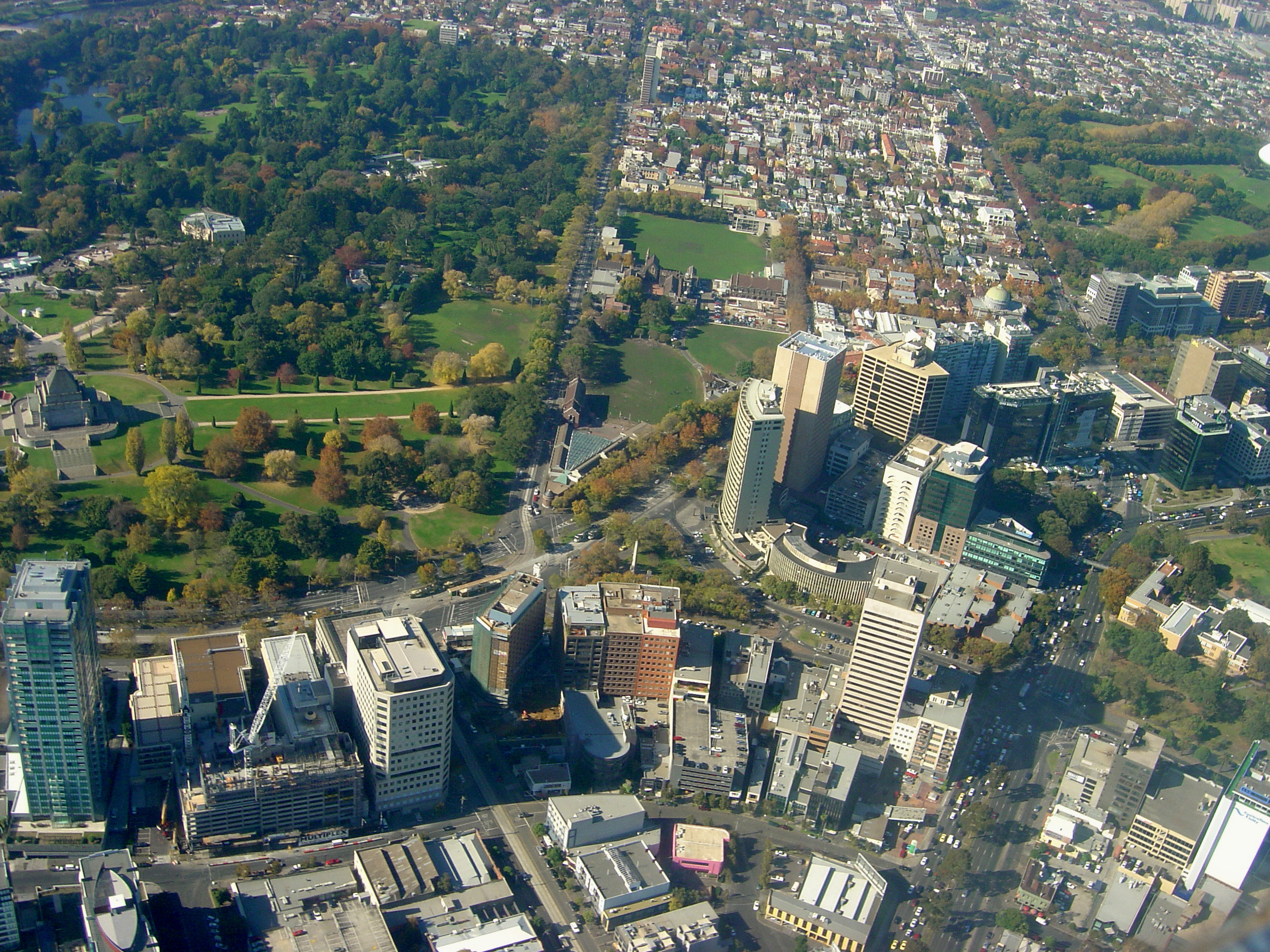
Aerial photograph of the previous Domain Interchange, 2004

As part of the construction of Anzac railway station, the Domain Interchange was closed in April 2018, and then demolished. The tracks were realigned around a new Anzac Station tram stop, located to the south of Domain Interchange, which opened in December 2022.

== Routes ==
Domain Interchange was one of the busiest tram interchanges on the system, with 14,000 passengers using it every day, and 150,000 passing through it. It was utilised by eight tram routes, all of which pass through the interchange.

At the time of its closure, the following routes operated through Domain Interchange:

- 3/3a: Melbourne University to Malvern East (diverting via St Kilda on weekends)
- 5: Melbourne University to Malvern
- 6: Moreland to Glen Iris
- 16: Melbourne University to Kew
- 58: West Coburg to Toorak
- 64: Melbourne University to Brighton East
- 67: Melbourne University to Carnegie
- 72: Melbourne University to Camberwell
