= Deaf Children Australia =

Australian non-profit organisation

- Abbreviation: DCA
- Formation: 1862
- Founder: Frederick J. Rose
- Type: Not-for-profit
- Legal status: Active
- Purpose: Support and advocacy for deaf and hard-of-hearing children and their families
- Headquarters: Bluestone Building, 597 St Kilda Road
- Location: Melbourne, Victoria
- Origins: Victorian Deaf and Dumb Institution
- Region served: Australia
- Website: www.deafchildrenaustralia.org.au

Deaf Children Australia (DCA) is a national not-for-profit organisation that supports deaf and hard-of-hearing children and young people and their families in Australia.

DCA was established in 1862 to meet the needs of deaf children and their families. DCA is housed in the Bluestone Building, built in 1866, in the Victorian capital of Melbourne.

== History ==
On 14 February 1859, Mrs Sarah Lewis wrote a letter to the Melbourne Argus newspaper stating that if there were no education options for her deaf daughter, she would have no choice but to have her daughter educated in England. In response to the letter, a deaf man, Frederick J Rose opened the School for the Deaf and Dumb in Peel Street, Prahran on 12 November 1860. In October 1866, the Bluestone Building at 597 St Kilda Road opened in response to increasing pupil numbers, and the need for a permanent building with accommodation. In January 1949, the name of the institution was changed from Victorian Deaf and Dumb Institution to Victorian School for Deaf Children. In February 2003, in response to the growing need for national services, a decision was made to establish DCA as a national entity to advocate for all deaf and hard-of-hearing children across Australia.

== Current Day Services ==
=== Helpline ===
DCA's free, anonymous and confidential helpline provides assistance for families of deaf and hard-of-hearing children. The helpline can also answer questions from professionals, students, and the public on deafness and hearing impairment. The helpline provides:

- Access to DCA's services.
- Information and contact details for specialised services.
- Information on deafness and hearing impairment for families, students, professionals, and the public.
- Connection to support groups for parents.

=== Services ===
DCA provides an information service that produces publications and resources as well as a community development service that provides deaf awareness training.

DCA also provides family support workers to help navigate services for parents with a deaf or hard-of-hearing child.

Each semester DCA provides Auslan (Australian sign language) courses for families.

Other services include organising recreation events for families and young deaf people.

=== NDIS Services ===
DCA is a registered National Disability Insurance Scheme (NDIS) provider. NDIS services include support coordination, Auslan tutoring, and youth services for capacity building.

=== Parent-to-Parent Program ===
The DCA's parent network has trained support parents who are available to meet with families over the phone or through home visits, at Early Intervention Centre playgroups, Parents of Deaf children (POD) group picnics, and other activities. Support parents can provide group or one-on-one support.

=== Grants ===
Every year, DCA provides grants for deaf and hearing-impaired people between the ages of 12 and 23. Grants up to $2500 are awarded to assist in implementing activities that improve the lives of deaf people and their families, as well as in recognition of the achievements of young people who are deaf or hard of hearing.

=== Sign for Work ===
DCA also operates Sign for Work, an agency that provides specialist services for people who are deaf or hearing impaired, and for people with other disabilities. Sign for Work assists in finding and applying for employment, and offers training, referral services, and free access to office facilities.

== See also ==
- Frederick J Rose
- Victorian College for the Deaf
