= List of places on the Victorian Heritage Register in the City of Port Phillip =

This is a list of places on the Victorian Heritage Register in the City of Port Phillip in Victoria, Australia. The Victorian Heritage Register is maintained by the Heritage Council of Victoria.

The Victorian Heritage Register, as of 2026, listed the following 133 state-registered places within the City of Port Phillip:

Place name	Place #	Location	Suburb	Co-ordinates	Built	State registered	Photo
All Saints' Anglican Church			St Kilda East				
Astor Theatre							
Beacon Cove light rail station							
Eildon Mansion							
Junction Oval							
Luna Park							
MacRobertson Girls' High School buildings							
Newburn Flats							
Palais Theatre							
Princes Pier							
Priory Ladies' School Boarding House							
Sacred Heart Church			St Kilda				
St Kilda Botanical Gardens			St Kilda				
St Kilda Pavilion			St Kilda				
St Vincent Gardens							
St Vincent Place							
South Melbourne Town Hall			South Melbourne				
St Kilda Street Bridge							
Station Pier							
Tram shelter	H1869	Cnr St Kilda Rd and Dorcas St	South Melbourne	37°49′48″S 144°58′16″E	1917	9 March 2000	
Tram shelters (Note: Two tram shelters located at the same intersection. One is located in the City of Port Phillip; the other is located in the City of Melbourne, on the corner of St Kilda Rd and High St.)	H1867	Cnr St Kilda Rd and Lorne St	Melbourne	37°51′01″S 144°58′51″E	1927	9 March 2000	
