= Cestria (house) =

Heritage-listed mansion in Melbourne, Victoria, Australia

- Location of the former mansion in Greater Metropolitan Melbourne

General information
- Status: Completed
- Type: Mansion
- Architectural style: Federation American Romanesque; Richardsonian Romanesque
- Location: 521 Glenferrie Road, Hawthorn, City of Boroondara, Melbourne, Victoria, Australia
- Coordinates: 37°49′47″S 145°02′01″E
- Completed: 1891; 135 years ago
- Client: Thomas Bibby Guest
- Owner: T. B. Guest and family (1891–1934)

Technical details
- Material: Red bricks; slate; stucco; timber; cast iron
- Size: c.sixteen bedrooms
- Floor count: 3 plus tower
- Grounds: 2,851 m^{2} (30,690 sq ft) (2009)

Design and construction
- Architect: Edward George Kilburn
- Architecture firm: Ellerker and Kilburn

Victorian Heritage Register
- Official name: Cestria
- Type: Registered place
- Designated: 9 August 2001
- Reference no.: VHR H1924
- Heritage overlay no.: HO242
- Category: Residential buildings (private)

Register of the National Estate
- Official name: Cestria
- Type: Defunct register
- Designated: 30 June 1992
- Reference no.: 15278

Cestria is a former mansion, now house, located at 521 Glenferrie Road in Hawthorn, in the City of Boroondara, in the inner eastern suburbs of Melbourne, in Victoria, Australia.

Built in 1891 on the traditional lands of the Wurundjeri people, the house was added to the Victorian Heritage Register on 9 August 2001 in recognition of its historical and architectural significance; and was also added to non-statutory lists by the Victorian branch of the National Trust on 24 June 1982 and the now defunct Register of the National Estate on 30 June 1992.

== History ==
Cestria was built in 1891, during the Melbourne land boom, for the wealthy biscuit manufacturer Thomas Bibby Guest (Snr.). (Note: Guests Biscuits was acquired by Arnott's Biscuits Pty Ltd in the 1950s.) Architect Edward George Kilburn of the partnership Ellerker and Kilburn signed the drawings. Kilburn had visited Europe and the United States in 1889 and was influenced greatly by the architectural developments there. He returned to Australia and in July 1890 designed the Priory Ladies' School building, at 61 Alma Road in St Kilda, in the American Romanesque style.

The American Romanesque style – used interchangeably with the term Richardsonian Romanesque, a Romanesque Revivalist style – readily lent itself to picturesque effects and additionally was supposed by contemporary Australian journals such as the Building and Engineering Journal to be suited to the requirements of the Australian climate.

Cestria followed the next year and also strongly demonstrated the Federation Romanesque Revival style which was perceived at the time to be a major step towards a style suitable for the Australian climate and a positive development from the stucco and cast iron Victorian Italianate and eclectic work of the past. In Australia, the Depression of 1891 cut short the life of the new style and by the time the economy recovered at the turn of the century, new stylistic ideas were in vogue. In the United States, the Richardsonian Romanesque style was little used after 1890. Also the Romanesque style tended to be used predominantly for commercial and ecclesiastical buildings. Cestria is unusual as one of just a small number of Romanesque Revival style buildings in Victoria and an important example of this style as applied to a residence.

In January 1892, Guest and his wife, Jemima, celebrated the completion of their new home with a grand party for approximately 200 guests. With three sons and four daughters, the house was often the scene for a variety of social gatherings until Guest's death in 1908; when his widow was bequeathed the residence for the duration of her life.

In June 1934, the house, set on 9,100 square metres (2.25 acres) was sold and then further subdivided into 5,100-square-metre (1.25-acre) lots and sold again in September 1934. Meanwhile, it was reported that the house had been expanded from twenty to forty rooms. In 1942, Olive Eugenie Littlewood, a daughter of Eugenie Louise Bainbridge, made an application for Letters of Administration, after her mother died intestate as the owner of Cestria.

By March 2009, Cestria was reported as being used as a boarding house for approximately 35 lodgers and in a state of disrepair; and several months later, set on 2,851 square metres (30,690 sq ft) with sixteen bedrooms, the former mansion sold for A$4.15 million.

== Description ==
The house is of three storeys with a four storey tower over the main entrance. It is constructed of tuck-pointed face red brick relieved with cement dressings. The roof is covered with slates with terracotta ridging and finials; with the gable ends being highly decorated with render consoles or brackets. The external woodwork was originally wood grained in imitation of superior timbers. A broad verandah on cast iron columns shades the ground floor on the north and west faces. The main entrance is through a characteristically American Romanesque semi-circular archway. Semi-circular headed openings are employed on windows, in arcades on second stage of the tower, and to group together flat arch windows on each side of fourth stage of tower. The perforated waffle balustrade on the main facade is repeated as a motif in openings to the north elevation.

Cestria is asymmetrically planned with the street frontage having a gable roofed projecting wing containing a faceted bay window at ground level. This window is heavily moulded and has a balustrade with square openings forming a parapet balcony to the rectangular shaped sash window above. A single-storey verandah covers part of the front elevation and returns along the north side. A brick porch encloses the recessed front door, which is approached through an arch decorated with rusticated voussoirs and foliated keystone and capitals. The first floor of the porch is a triple arcade supported on squat square-headed columns and with a square-pierced half-height balustrade that matched the bay window parapet.

The tower is placed to one side of the front door, contrasting with the traditional placing and balance of towers in asymmetrical two-storey houses. The tower has one level of plain sash window and an upper level of grouped openings unified by a rendered arch above them. The render decorated arched window design is repeated on the north facade of the building with one large arched window containing three sashes surmounted by an arched glass panel with square grid glazing bars, a separate plain sash and an upper group of arch topped highly decorated ventilator openings with interior square grid pattern and foliate moulding to the gable point. The tall red brick chimney stacks have render decoration to their tops and terracotta pots. The service wing, which is part of the street facade, has a timber entry porch.

Internally, the impressive hall and staircase are constructed from mahogany and walnut, adding to the distinctively American feel. The stairwell is lit by three large windows with centrally placed stained glass panels depicting rural scenes, surrounded by leaded, coloured geometric glass. In the kitchen area, an original example of the ubiquitous electric bell panel is evidence of the large retinue of servants once employed to run a house of this size.

== See also ==
- Architecture of Melbourne
- List of places on the Victorian Heritage Register in the City of Boroondara
