= St Kilda Road =

Road in Melbourne, Victoria, Australia

Coordinates: 37°49′14″S 144°58′08″E

St Kilda Road Victoria
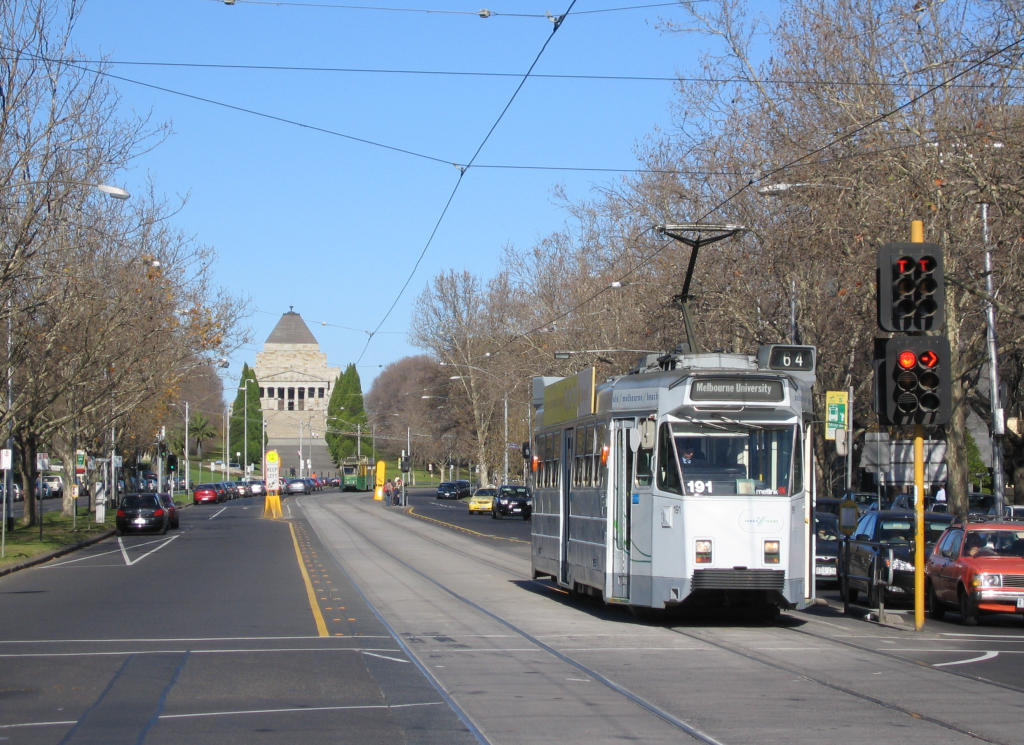
- Looking away from the City towards the Shrine of Remembrance

General information
- Type: Road
- Length: 6 km (3.7 mi)
- Route number(s): Metro Route 3 (1965–present); Concurrencies: Metro Route 26 (1965–present) (through Melbourne); Metro Route 29 (1965–present) (through St Kilda)
- Former route number: National Route 1 (1955–1969) (South Yarra–St Kilda)

Major junctions
- North end: Swanston Street; Melbourne CBD
- Linlithgow Avenue; Kings Way; Toorak Road West; High Street; Punt Road; Queens Road; Fitzroy Street; Barkly Street
- South end: Brighton Road; St Kilda, Melbourne

Location(s)
- Major suburbs: Southbank, St Kilda

St Kilda Road is a street in Melbourne, Victoria, Australia. It is part of the locality of Melbourne, which has the postcode of 3004, and, along with Swanston Street, forms a major spine of the city.

St Kilda Road begins at Princes Bridge, which spans the Yarra River and connects the central business district of Melbourne with the suburb of St Kilda, ending at Carlisle Street, St Kilda. The road continues as Brighton Road, which becomes the Nepean Highway, forming a major arterial connecting the bayside suburbs and Mornington Peninsula to the city.

The east side of the road to High Street, Prahran is in the municipality of the City of Melbourne while the west side of the road from Dorcas Street, and the east side south of High Street, is in the municipality of the City of Port Phillip.

The road was the location of many institutions dotted along its length, and was famed for being lined with elegant mansions until the middle of the 20th century. With their replacement by numerous offices from the 1950s- 1980s, it became a commercial centre, and since the 1990s has also become home to many large scale apartment projects.

== History ==
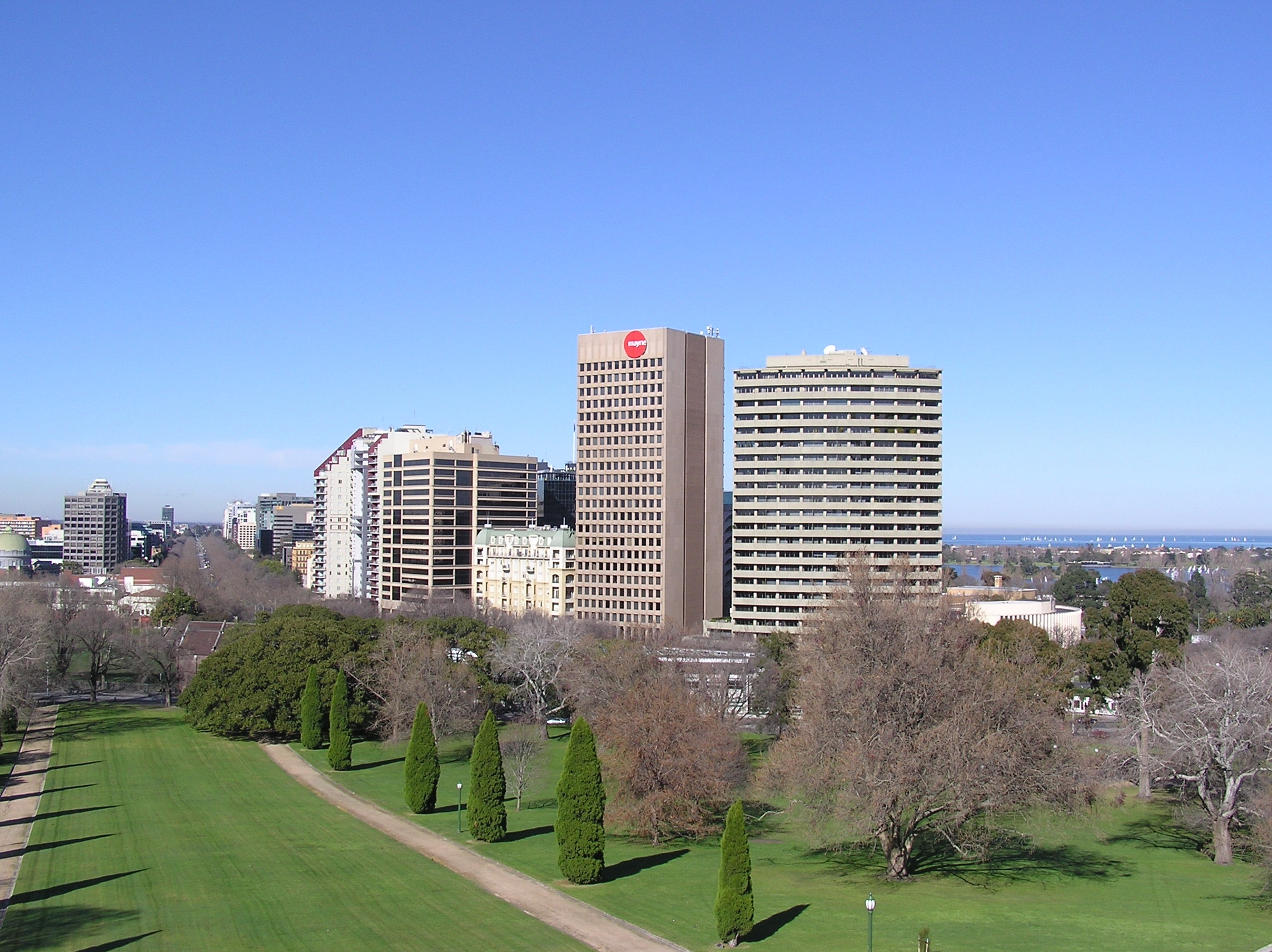
Melbourne St Kilda Road and Port Phillip Bay (seen from top of the Shrine of Remembrance)

In the 1830s the road leading south out of Melbourne towards St Kilda, and on to Brighton, was known variously as the St Kilda Road, the Brighton Road, and Baxter's Track, after Melbourne's first postmaster, Captain Baxter. The area immediately south of the river was low lying swampy land, which remained mostly vacant crown land for much of the 19th century, with a rise to the east, which the road skirted around, to head south-south east in a straight line towards Brighton.

The first sale of Crown lands in the seaside locality of St Kilda, connected to St Kilda Road via Fitzroy Street, took place on 7 December 1842. Within a few years, St Kilda became a fashionable area for wealthy settlers, with the high ground above the beach offering a cool fresh breeze during Melbourne's hot summer months. The road to the city was impassable by carriage after rain, which turned the road to mud. For the first few years, traffic to the city crossed the Yarra River by privately operated punts. In 1844, a privately built wooden trestle toll bridge was built across the river at Swanston Street.

In 1850, a government-built sandstone bridge, Princes Bridge, replaced the wooden bridge. The bridge was designed by David Lennox, a Scottish-trained engineer who had arrived in Melbourne from New South Wales in 1844. The opening of the bridge was a major occasion, with Superintendent Charles La Trobe and Georgiana McCrae in attendance.

In 1853, the Immigrants' Aid Society established the Immigrant's Home on the east side of St Kilda Road, which accommodated 'neglected' and orphaned children and also had a reformatory for children. The Home existed until 1902 when it was relocated, and the site became part of the Kings Domain gardens, established in 1854.

Between the city and what is now St Kilda Junction, sites were granted to various institutions, or remained government reserves in the 1850s and 60s. In 1854 the Wesleyan Methodist Church was offered 10 acres (40,000 m^{2}) fon the road near the junction, but the foundation stone of Wesley College was not laid until 4 January 1865, and the school was officially opened on 11 January 1866. Much closer to the city, in 1855 the government granted 15 acres (61,000 m^{2}) on St Kilda Road to the Anglican Church on which Melbourne Grammar School was built. The foundation stone was laid on 30 July 1856 and the school was officially opened on 7 April 1858.

During the early 1850s, St Kilda Road was the scene of one of the most notorious hold-ups by armed bandits and bushrangers (though this actually took place on what is now known as Brighton Road further south). Victoria Barracks were built between 1856 and 1872. By the 1860s, St Kilda had developed as a desirable seaside suburb, dotted with large houses and grand terraces. St Kilda Road was a main arterial connecting it with Melbourne, and was planned as a wide European-style boulevard to accommodate horse-drawn traffic. The road was properly surfaced for the first time in 1859, and planted with street trees in the 1860s.

In 1859 lots along the east side were alienated from government land for building lots, opposition was somewhat mollified by the generous 100 ft frontages and the requirement for substantial homes to be built rather than terraces. The land behind became Fawkner Park, created in 1862. In 1875 the west side of the road was subdivided in the same way, and Queens Road was created. By the 1880s the road was lined with large houses, though some were on double or triple lots, and other lots were left vacant.

In 1865 the government made a grant of land on the corner of St Kilda Road and High Street, just south of Wesley, to the Victorian Deaf and Dumb Institution (now, the Victorian College for the Deaf), which built a blue-stone building which opened in 1866. Two years later, on the north side of Wesley, the Royal Victorian Institute for the Blind opened in buildings very similar in style to the Deaf Institute, designed by the same architects. The Alfred Hospital was established in 1871 on a site fronting Commercial Road, with a boundary to St Kilda Road, later carved off.

In 1877, Cooper and Bailey's Great American International Circus set up on the site of the present Arts Centre. The present Princes Bridge was built in 1888 to replace the 1850 structure, and cable trams commenced running from Swanston Street over the bridge along St Kilda Road to Toorak and St Kilda. At this time, the elm trees were planted along the road. The Prince Henry's Hospital (originally called the Melbourne Homoeopathic Hospital) was opened in St Kilda Road in 1885, and existed until 1991.

Until the end of the 19th century, the Yarra River was subject to regular flooding. A new channel for the Yarra River was dug from 1896 to 1900 to straighten and widen the river. The spoil was used to fill the swampy lagoons and brickmakers pits and raise the height of the river bank where Alexandra Gardens now stands. The Gardens were opened in 1901.

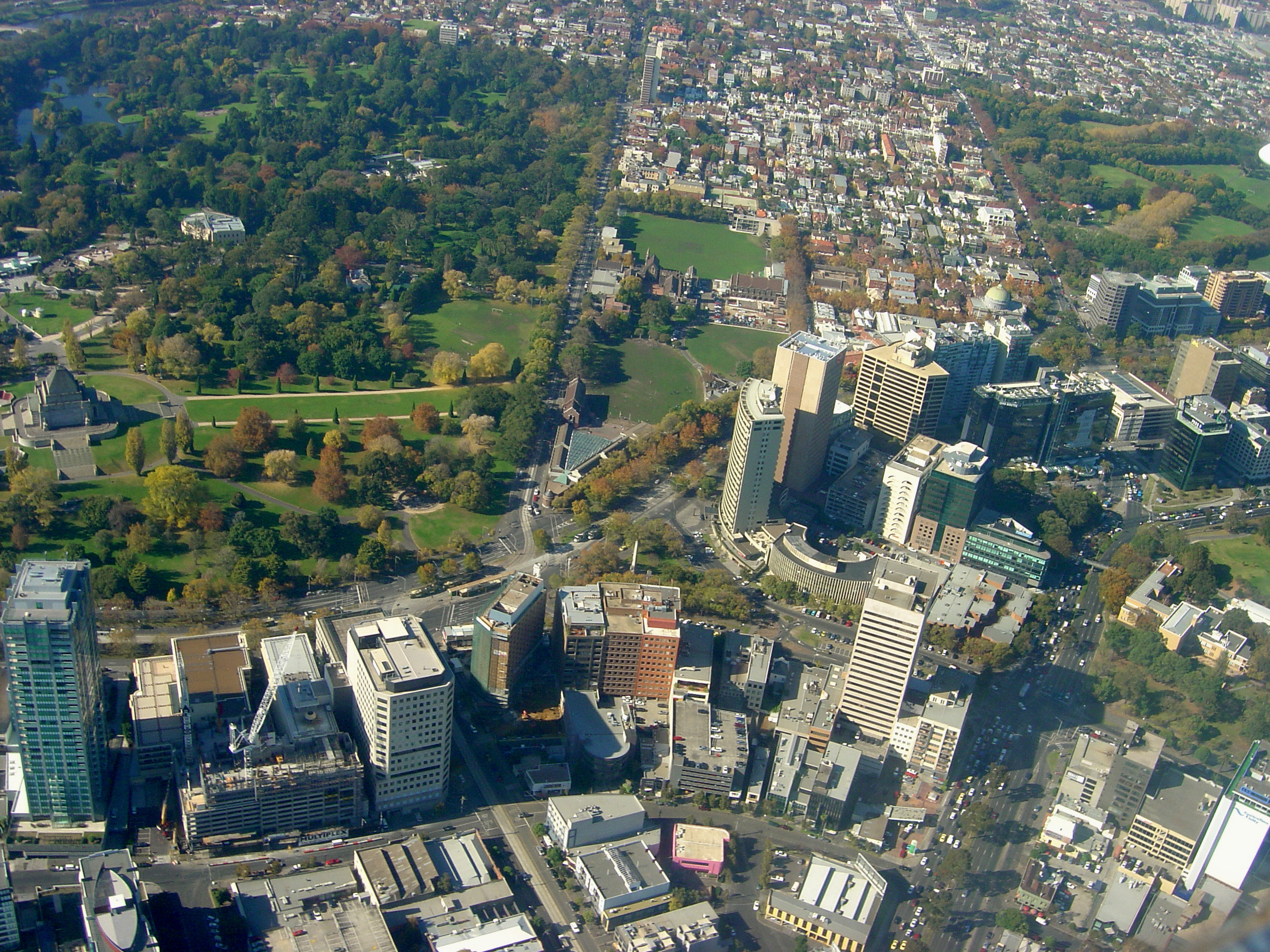
Aerial view of the Domain Interchange on St Kilda Road. The road passes along the southern edge of the Shrine of Remembrance then diagonally to the right of the frame

In 1901 the Arts Centre site became home to a permanent circus, Olympia, built by the Fitzgerald Brothers' Circus. In 1904, the area of the site not occupied by Fitzgerald's was developed as a fashionable meeting place called Prince's Court. This area featured a Japanese Tea House, open-air theatre, miniature train, water chute and a 15-member military band. In 1907, Wirth Brother's Circus took over the entire site from Fitzgerald's and remained there for the next 50 years. By 1911 they had built a new circus Hippodrome and a roller skating rink, and had leased the original Olympia as a cinema. During World War I some of the buildings were used as nursing homes for soldiers and nurses. During the 1920s a new Green Mill Dance Hall replaced the Jazz Pavilion and Olympia Dancing Palace.

In 1925, electric trams along St Kilda Road and the side streets replaced cable trams, and Princes Bridge was reinforced to take the extra weight of the new trams.

The Melbourne Hebrew Congregation opened a 1300-seat synagogue on the corner of Toorak Road in 1930. During the depression of the 1930s, many of the mansions on St Kilda Road were subdivided into units with extensions to the rear of the buildings, resulting in only a few of them remaining today. The Shrine of Remembrance was completed in September 1934. The Repatriation Commission Outpatient Clinic, the only example of an Art Deco building on St Kilda Road north of Toorak Road, was opened on 15 November 1937.

While large houses continued to be built in the 1900s-1920s, from the 1910s flats also started to emerge, built on former gardens or replacing the earlier houses. Flat development continued in the early the 1950s, such as the high rise Stanhill Flats built on Queens Road, and the elegant Sheridan Close.

In 1957, the Melbourne & Metropolitan Board of Works rezoned the street to allow office development, and in the next two decades most of the remaining houses and even some of the flats were replaced by ever taller office blocks, albeit retaining a substantial garden setback. The area was given the postcode 3004, and was allowed to use the title "Melbourne", effectively extending the central business district area. The Green Mill Dance Hall closed in 1950 and the remainder of the Wirth buildings on the Arts Centre site were destroyed by fire in 1953. Much of site was used as an outdoor carpark before construction of the National Gallery of Victoria commenced in the early 1960s. The gallery opened in 1968.

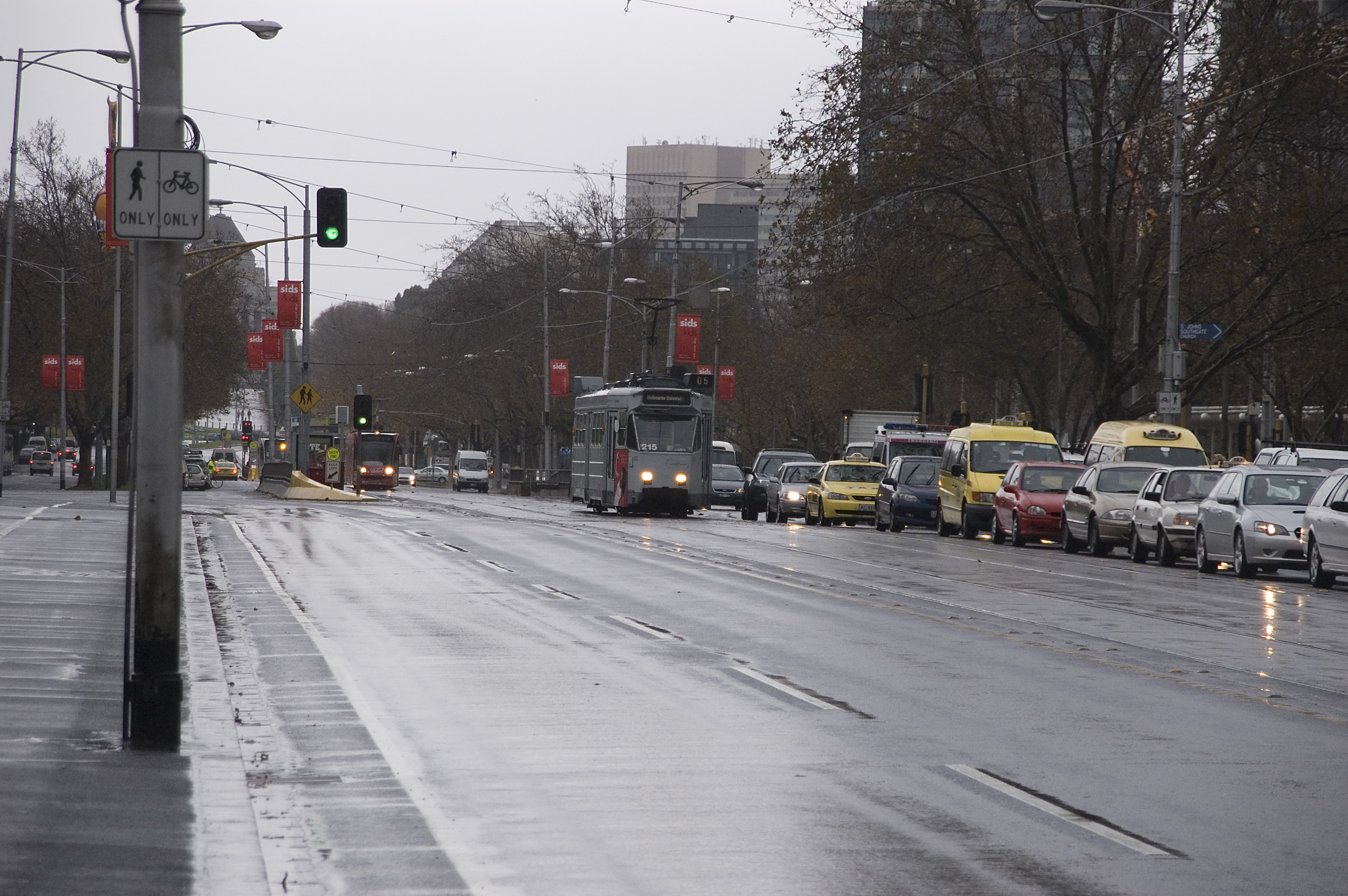
The beginning of St Kilda Road from the Princes Bridge

In the late 1960s, the Main Roads Board compulsorily acquired much of the land around St Kilda Junction and demolished many of the buildings including the landmark Junction Hotel in order to completely rebuild the junction. Queens Road was connected to Dandenong Road via an underpass.The west side of High Street (from the junction to Carlisle Street) was also acquired and demolished to increase it to the approximate width of St Kilda Road, and renamed St Kilda Road, effectively extending it to Carlisle Street.

Construction of the Arts Centre began in 1973 following some delays. The complex opened in stages, with Hamer Hall opening in 1982, and the Theatres Building opening in 1984. The redevelopment of the Southbank precinct along the Yarra River commenced in 1990 with the construction of the Southbank Promenade.

In the early 1980s, heritage controls protected the few surviving mansions and notable flats, and a 60m height limit was introduced, bringing uniformity to the street during another boom in office construction.

On 13 February 2017 St Kilda Rd was included on Australia’s National Heritage List. In June 2017, a small number of the elm trees lining St. Kilda Road were cut down for the Melbourne Metro Rail Tunnel project.

== Today ==
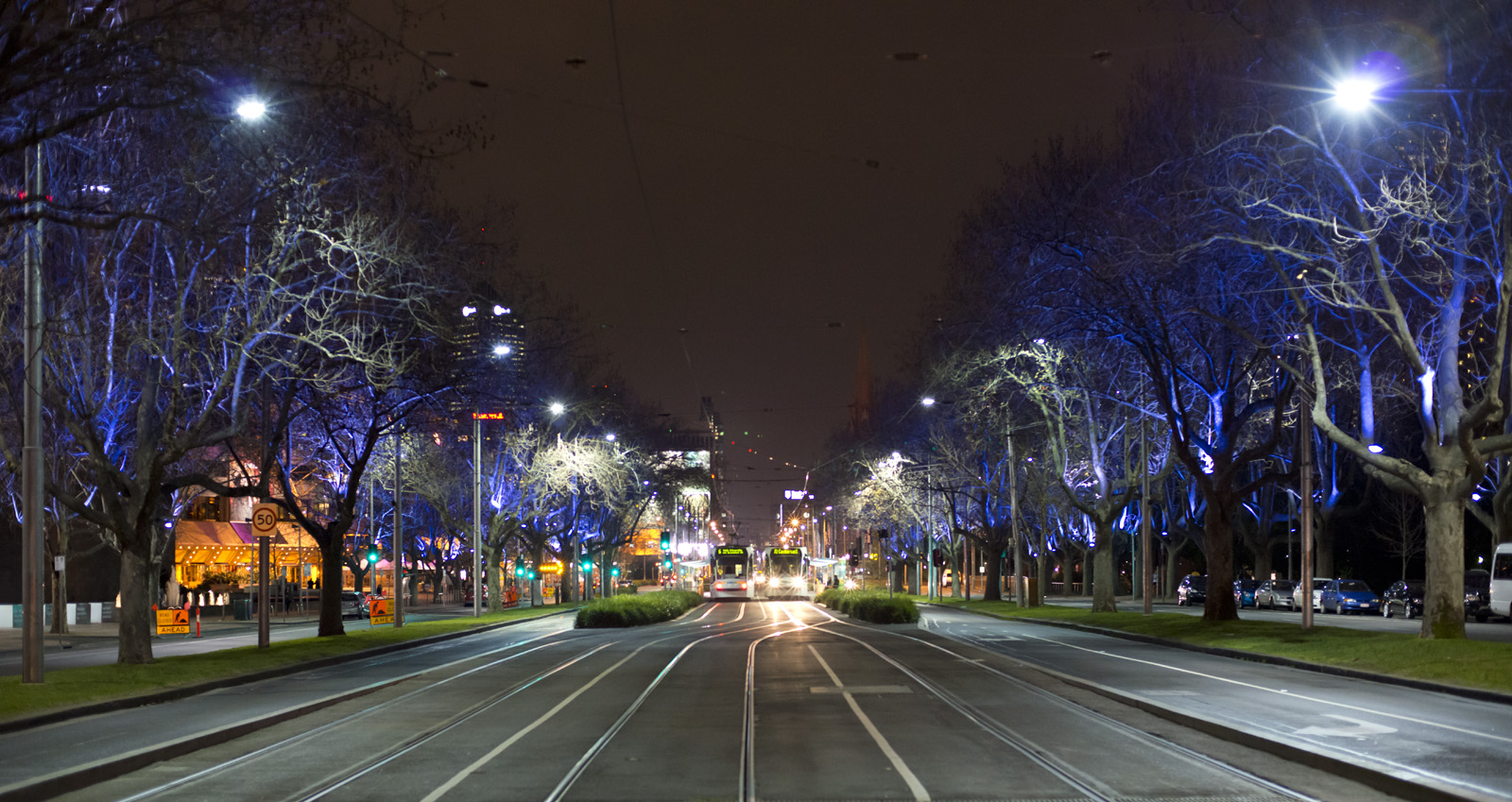
View down St Kilda Road at night, showing (from centre of photograph): tram lines, traffic lanes, tree-lined medians, more traffic lanes, and street side parking

Today St Kilda Road has been absorbed by the metropolis and the road survives as one of the city's major arteries, flanked by a mix of office, residential and mixed use towers.

The street is known for its width and leafiness. For most of its length, the wide street consists of a wide shared footpath (lined with Elm trees), street side parking, a bicycle lane, two lanes for motor vehicle traffic, median strip reserve (lined with mature London plane trees), another two lanes for motor vehicle traffic and a tram line on either side.

Melbourne's trams travel down the centre of the road along the length of the street.

There have been proposals for a separated bike lane to be installed.

== Landmarks ==
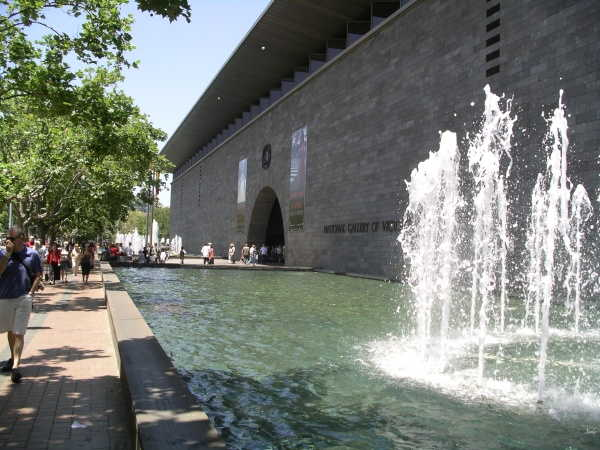
National Gallery of Victoria

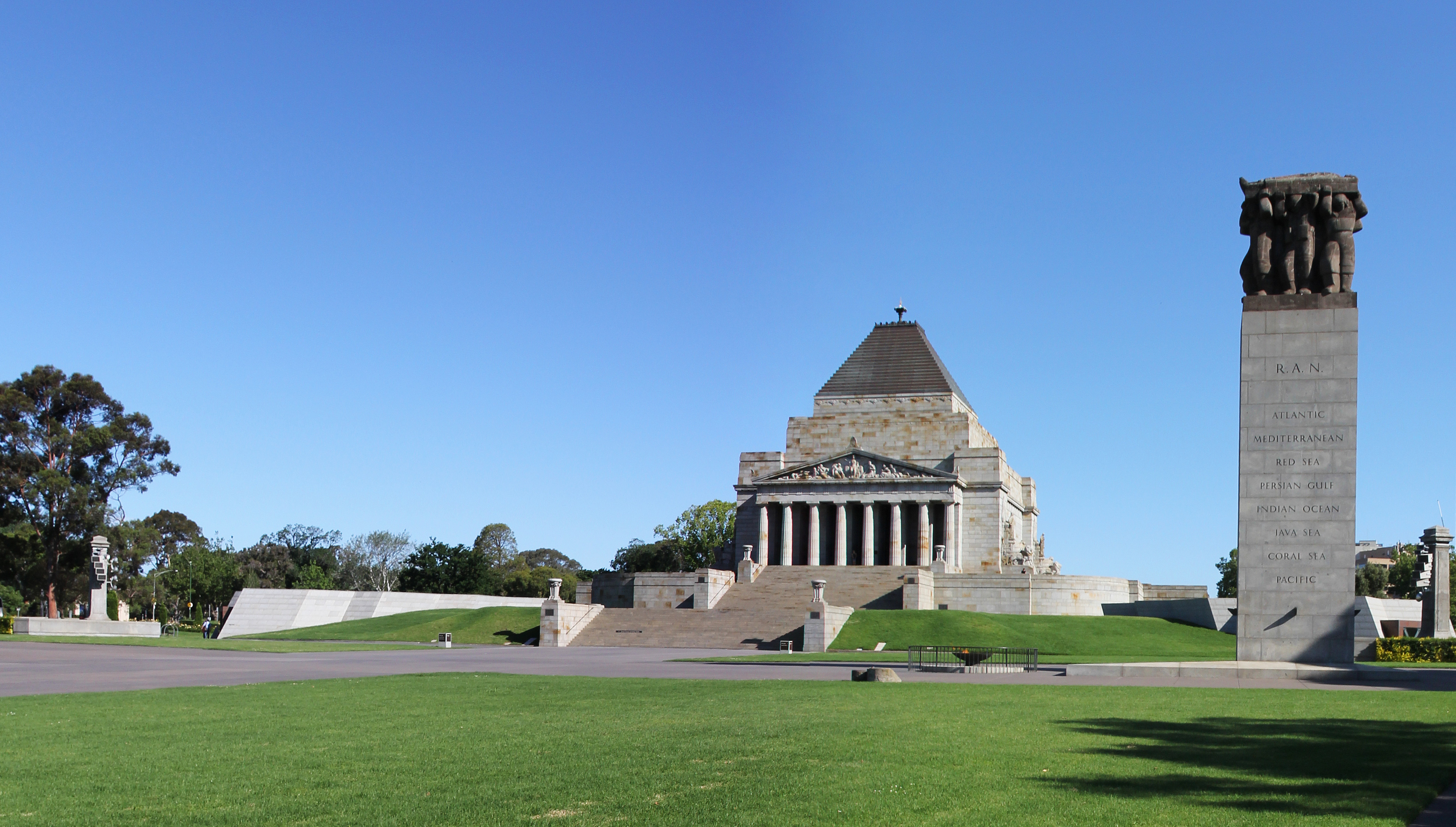
Shrine of Remembrance in St Kilda Road

St Kilda Road passes alongside several of Melbourne's famous parks, landmarks, and institutions, including:

- Alexandra Gardens
- Anzac Station tram stop
- Arts Centre Melbourne
- Melbourne Grammar School
- National Gallery of Victoria
- Repatriation Commission Outpatient Clinic
- Shrine of Remembrance
- St Kilda Junction
- Two tram shelters in Melbourne and a tram shelter in South Melbourne
- Victoria Barracks
- Victorian College of the Arts
- Victorian College for the Deaf and Deaf Children Australia's historic bluestone building
- Wesley College campuses

== Transport ==
Tram routes 1, 3, 5, 6, 16, 58, 64, 67 and 72 currently run along the road, thus making it the busiest tram corridor in the world. A number of bus routes also run along the road, making it well connected to both the city and surrounding suburbs.

== Events ==
- Southbank Sunday markets - held outside the Arts Centre.
- 2006 Commonwealth Games opening ceremony
- Great Melbourne Bike Ride

Because of its width and central location, the road is used for many marches, including the following regular events:

- Moomba
- Anzac Day parade – to the Shrine
- Starting point for the AFL Grand Final Parade

== See also ==
- 350 St Kilda Road
