= Tram shelters, St Kilda Road =

Heritage-listed tram shelters in Melbourne, Victoria, Australia

- Location of the tram shelters in Greater Metropolitan Melbourne

General information
- Status: Completed
- Type: Tram shelters
- Architectural style: Edwardian
- Location: St Kilda Road, Melbourne, Victoria, Australia
- Coordinates: 37°51′01″S 144°58′51″E
- Completed: 1927; 99 years ago
- Client: Melbourne Tramways Board

Technical details
- Material: Weatherboard; timber; glass; terracotta; shingles

Design and construction
- Architect: Alan G. Monsbourgh

Victorian Heritage Register
- Official name: Tram Shelter (Cnr St Kilda Rd and Lorne St)
- Type: Registered place
- Designated: 9 March 2000
- Reference no.: VHR H1867
- Heritage overlay no.: HO247
- Category: Transport - Tramways

Victorian Heritage Register
- Official name: Tram Shelter (Cnr St Kilda Rd and High St)
- Type: Registered place
- Designated: 9 March 2000
- Reference no.: VHR H1868
- Heritage overlay no.: HO909
- Category: Transport - Tramways

The St Kilda tram shelters are two tram shelters located on St Kilda Road, at its intersection with both Lorne and High streets, in the suburb of Melbourne. The shelters were both constructed in 1927 for the Melbourne Tramways Board and are two of only five remaining tram shelters in Melbourne from a distinct group of nine picturesque closed timber shelters built between 1912 and 1927 in a style based on Edwardian domestic fashion. The shelters are located on the median strips at the intersection, respectively, on the south-west corner in the City of Port Phillip; and the other on the north-east corner in the City of Melbourne; in Victoria, Australia.

Built on the traditional lands of the Wurundjeri people, the tram shelters were both added to the Victorian Heritage Register on 9 March 2000 in recognition of their historical and architectural significance; and were two of three tram shelters on St Kilda Road that were added to a non-statutory list by the Victorian branch of the National Trust on 3 April 2000.

== History ==
The Melbourne Tramways Board (MTB) was established in 1916 by the Victorian Government to manage the consolidation of the cable and electric tramway systems in operation in Melbourne by various local government trusts and licensed operators. The growth of tramways was one of the greatest municipal developments in Victoria during the first decade of the twentieth century. The waiting shelters are an important remnant of this period of Melbourne's transport history and a tangible reminder of the MTB that morphed, in 1919, to become the Melbourne & Metropolitan Tramways Board (1919–1983).

Due to Melbourne's changeable weather conditions, the various tramway operators in Melbourne built shelters at tram stops, and a small number of the shelters are extant and in current use. They were initially built in the outer extent of the tramway routes, due to the limited frequency of tram services, where passengers could wait for 15 minutes or more for a tram; or at major interchanges between the various tram routes. Some of the shelters were built from timber and others using iron.

The two tram shelters at the corner of St Kilda Road, at its junction with both High Street Lorne Street, were built in 1927. They replaced earlier shelters erected by the Prahran and Malvern Tramways Trust (PMTT) in 1913 and 1919. The shelters served passengers making the connection between the St Kilda Road cable trams and the departure point of the electric cars on the PMTT High Street route. The provenance of the shelter on the High Street corner is uncertain, but it may be the same as the Lorne Street shelter opposite, which was designed by architect Alan G. Monsbourgh for the MTB. The design is heavily derivative of the earlier shelters of the same type.

== Description ==
The front wall of the shelters facing the tram stops is half open. The timber-framed shelters are clad externally to sill height in horizontal weatherboards and internally in vertical V-jointed lining boards. Similar boards cover the ceiling. The floor on both shelters is the concrete slab upon which they stand. The benches are of timber frames and slats. The upper halves of timber framed windows are in multi-paned patterned translucent glass with a segmental arch head. Vertical boarding is continued between the frame members above window head height. The gable section of wall in each shelter is clad in vertical slats spaced to give ventilation. The gable roof in each shelter is clad in terracotta shingles with a crested terracotta ridge. The rafters are exposed under the projecting eaves with a spaced board lining above. The gables project a similar distance to the eaves and are supported on timber brackets with vertical infill. The upper section of each shelter is filled with a horizontal board at ceiling height to match the barges and an infill of vertical spaced boards.

The High Street shelter shows more detailing than the Lorne Street shelter diagonally opposite, including scrolled carving of the projecting ridge beam and an upturn hiding the end of the gutter on the barge board ends.

== See also ==
- Architecture of Melbourne
- List of places on the Victorian Heritage Register in the City of Melbourne
- List of places on the Victorian Heritage Register in the City of Port Phillip
- Trams in Melbourne
