= Philippa Christian =

Australian celebrity, author

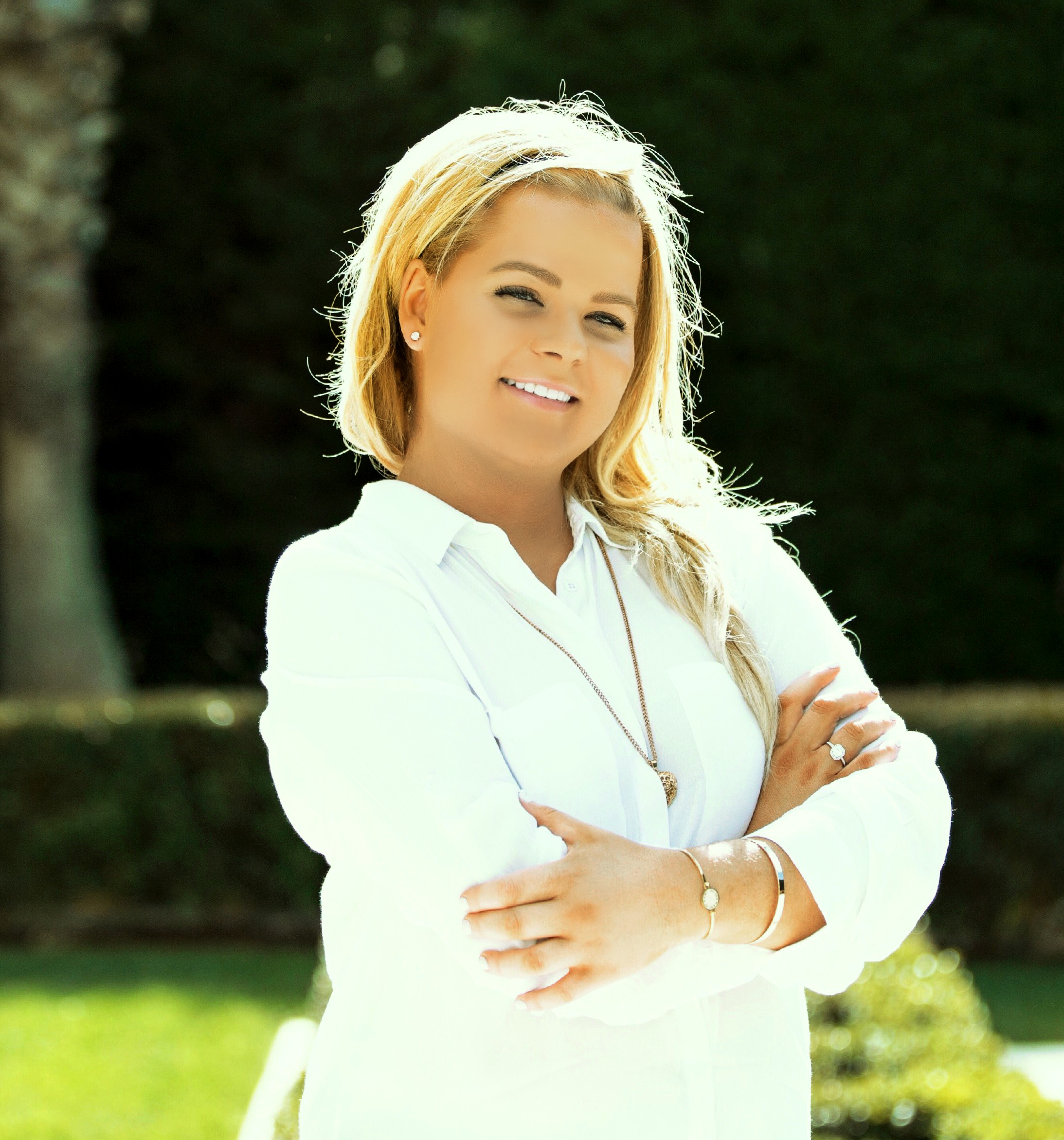
- Melbourne in May 2016
- Born: Brighton, Victoria, Australia
- Occupations: Nanny, television personality, author
- Years active: 1998–present (nanny); 2015–present (author)
- Known for: Author Nanny Confidential
- Website: philippachristian.com

Philippa Christian is an Australian celebrity nanny, television personality and author, from Brighton, Victoria, Australia. She has appeared in programmes on several Australian and American television networks. plus National and International Radio. Her debut novel, Nanny Confidential, was published in the summer of 2015.

== Career ==
Born in Brighton, Victoria in Australia, Christian began baby-sitting at age 11, becoming well-known after working as a nanny for a number of Australian celebrities in Los Angeles, the Bahamas, and India.

Christian once refused $280,000 for a photo of a former client and his new celebrity girlfriend.

Christian has appeared regularly on National TV, Print

=== Writing ===
In the summer of 2015, Christian published her debut novel, Nanny Confidential with Allen & Unwin, showcasing the life of an elite celebrity nanny. Ghost-written by freelance writer, and former Gracia editor, Amy Molloy, the novel became a bestseller shortly after its release date.

=== Radio ===
Following the success of Nanny Confidential, Christian has been interviewed on Australian radio services, including the Kyle and Jackie O Show and 3AW with Denis Walter. Christian appeared on the BBC World Service in an interview with Kim Chakanetsa, about what it takes to be a Celebrity Nanny.

=== Television ===
Christian has appeared on numerous Australian morning television shows, including the Seven Network, and the Nine Network.

In February 2016 Christian was flown to Los Angeles to be interviewed on Entertainment Tonight
