= List of Melbourne tram routes =

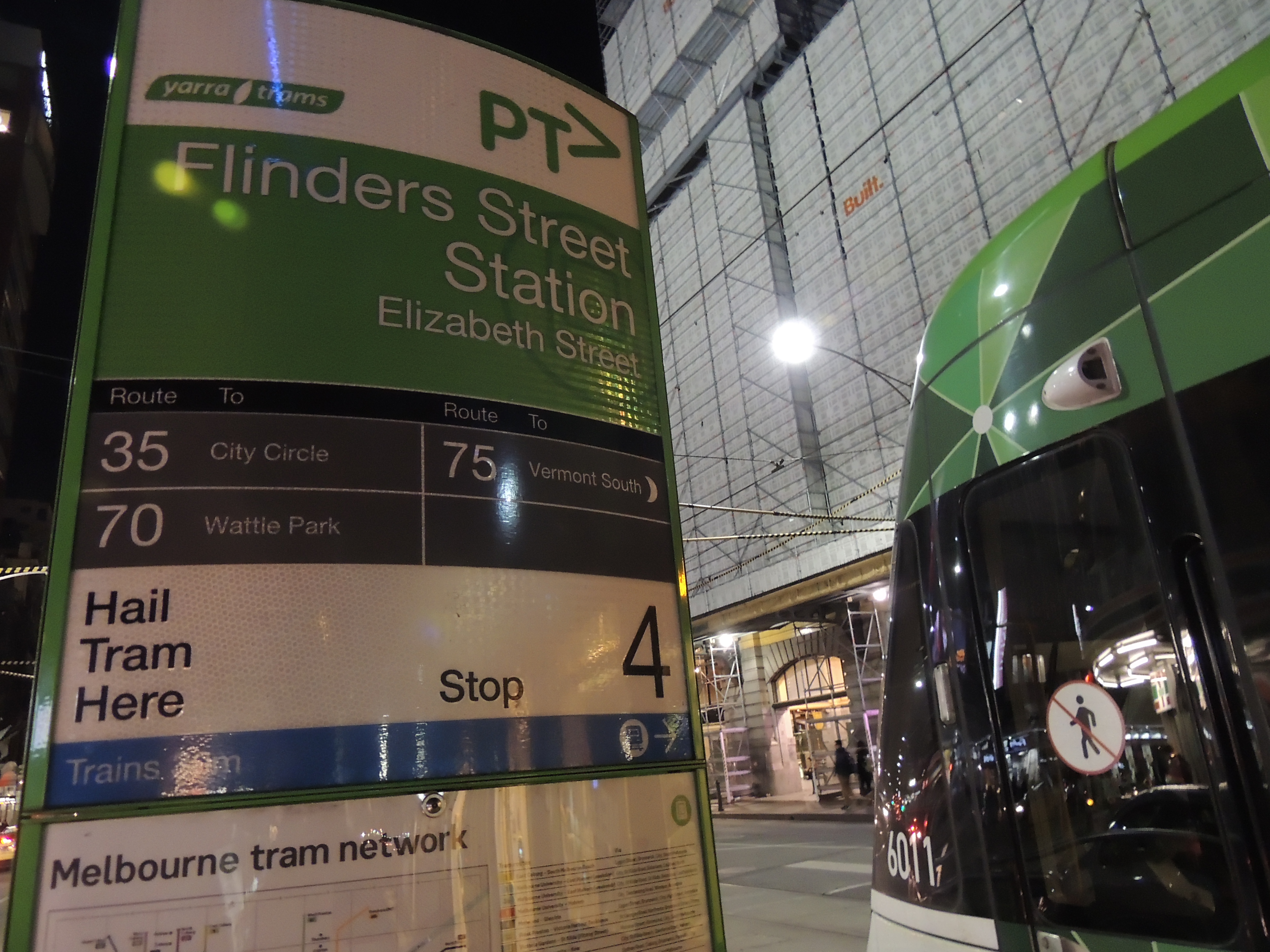
Tram stop sign outside Flinders Street railway station in July 2017.

Melbourne's tram network is a major form of transportation in Melbourne, Victoria, Australia, consisting of 24 tram routes. The system is owned by Public Transport Victoria. Yarra Journey Makers (trading as Yarra Trams), a joint venture of Transdev and John Holland Group, operates the network. The tram network consists of over 250 kilometres (160 miles) of duplicated track in all 24 routes, making it the largest tram network in the world.

The tram network consists of around 1,700 stops, with over 450 of them accessible to disabled passengers. Some tram stops can be accessed by ramps, making them compliant to the Disability Discrimination Act 1992. Accessible low-floor trams are also operational.

The tram network uses the Myki ticketing system, with the exception of the Free Tram Zone, which covers travel inside of the Melbourne CBD. The City Circle tourist tram also does not use Myki, as it is fully inside the Free Tram Zone. All tram routes are within fare zone 1, with some stops on routes 75, 86, and 109 being in the zone 1 and 2 overlap.

== List of current routes ==
Services that deviate from the regular routes below (by diversion or early-termination, also known as shortworkings) are suffixed with the letter 'a', while services diverting to and/or terminating at a tram depot are suffixed with 'd'.

Route	Terminus A	via	Terminus B	Full length	Depot	Fleet
1	East Coburg	Lygon Street (Carlton), Brunswick, City, & South Melbourne	South Melbourne Beach	13.2 km (8.2 mi)	Brunswick	B2, Z3
3	Melbourne University	City, St Kilda Road, Balaclava, & Caulfield North	East Malvern	14.9 km (9.3 mi)	Glenhuntly	B2, Z3
5	Melbourne University	City, Dandenong Road, Windsor, & Armadale	Malvern	12.6 km (7.8 mi)	Malvern	D1, Z3
6	Moreland	Lygon Street (Carlton), Brunswick, City, High Street (Prahran), & Armadale	Glen Iris	19.0 km (11.8 mi)	Brunswick & Malvern	D1, D2, Z3
11	West Preston	St Georges Road (Thornbury), Northcote, Brunswick Street, Fitzroy, & City	Victoria Harbour Docklands	13.3 km (8.3 mi)	Preston	E
12	Victoria Gardens	Victoria Street, Richmond, City, South Wharf, & South Melbourne	St Kilda	11.3 km (7.0 mi)	Southbank	A1, A2
16	Melbourne University	City, St Kilda Beach, Glenferrie Road (Hawthorn), & Malvern	Kew	20.2 km (12.6 mi)	Malvern	D1, Z3
19 (Note: Operates overnight on Saturday and Sunday mornings.)	North Coburg	Sydney Road, Coburg, Brunswick, Parkville, & City	Flinders Street station	10.2 km (6.3 mi)	Brunswick	D2, B2
30	St Vincent's Plaza	East Melbourne & La Trobe Street (City)	Central Pier & Docklands	2.9 km (1.8 mi)	Southbank	A1, A2, E
35 (Note: City Circle service operates between 9:30 am and 6:00 pm (Sundays to Wednesdays) or 9:00 pm (Thursdays to Saturdays), excluding Good Friday and Christmas Day.)	Waterfront City Docklands	Docklands, La Trobe Street (City), & Flinders Street (City)	Waterfront City Docklands	7.6 km (4.7 mi)	Southbank	W
48	North Balwyn	High Street (Kew), Bridge Road (Richmond), & City	Victoria Harbour Docklands	13.5 km (8.4 mi)	Kew	C1, A2
57	West Maribyrnong	Racecourse Road (Flemington), North Melbourne, & City	Flinders Street station	11.6 km (7.2 mi)	Essendon	Z3
58	West Coburg	Brunswick West, Parkville, City, & Toorak Road (South Yarra)	Toorak	18.2 km (11.3 mi)	Essendon & Southbank	Z3, B2, E
59	Airport West	Niddrie, Essendon, Moonee Ponds Junction, Flemington, Parkville, & City	Flinders Street station	14.7 km (9.1 mi)	Essendon	Z3, B2
64	Melbourne University	City, Dandenong Road, Windsor, & Caulfield South	East Brighton	16.1 km (10.0 mi)	Glenhuntly	B2, Z3
67	Melbourne University	City, Balaclava, Elsternwick, & Glen Huntly	Carnegie	15.5 km (9.6 mi)	Glenhuntly	B2, Z3
70	Wattle Park	Riversdale Road (Surrey Hills), Richmond, & City	Waterfront City Docklands	16.5 km (10.3 mi)	Camberwell	A1, A2, B2
72	Melbourne University	City, Commercial Road (South Yarra), Prahran, & Glen Iris	Camberwell	16.8 km (10.4 mi)	Malvern	D1, Z3
75	Vermont South Shopping Centre	Burwood, Hawthorn, Bridge Road (Richmond), & City	Central Pier, Docklands	22.8 km (14.2 mi)	Camberwell	A1, A2, B2
78	North Richmond	Chapel Street (South Yarra), Prahran, & Windsor	Balaclava	6.5 km (4.0 mi)	Kew	A2
82	Footscray	Maribyrnong, Maribyrnong Road, & Droop Street (Footscray)	Moonee Ponds Junction	9.2 km (5.7 mi)	Essendon	Z3
86	Bundoora RMIT	Preston, High Street (Thornbury), Northcote, Collingwood, & City	Waterfront City Docklands	22.2 km (13.8 mi)	Preston	E
96	East Brunswick	Nicholson Street (Fitzroy), City, Southbank, South Melbourne, & Albert Park	St Kilda Beach	13.9 km (8.6 mi)	Southbank & Preston	C2, E
109	Box Hill	Whitehorse Road (Balwyn), Mont Albert, City, & Montague Street (South Melbourne)	Port Melbourne	19.2 km (11.9 mi)	Kew	A2, C1

=== List of special event services ===
These are shortworkings of existing tram routes that operate during events at certain areas.

Route	Terminus A	Terminus B	For events at
3a	St Kilda Junction	Dandenong & Derby Roads, Caulfield East	Caulfield Racecourse
30a	Melbourne Central station	Central Pier	Docklands Stadium
57a	Flinders Street station	Sandown & Epsom Roads, Flemington	Melbourne Showgrounds
59a	Flinders Street station	Moonee Ponds Junction	Moonee Valley Racecourse
70a	Rod Laver Arena	Flinders Street West	Rod Laver Arena
70a	Melbourne Cricket Ground	Flinders Street West	Melbourne Cricket Ground, John Cain Arena
70a	Melbourne Rectangular Stadium	Flinders Street West	Melbourne Rectangular Stadium
75a	Simpson Street & Wellington Parade, East Melbourne	Flinders Street West	Melbourne Cricket Ground
75a	Flinders Street station	Harbour Town Shopping Centre	Victoria Harbour
86a	Russell & Bourke Streets, City	Central Pier	Docklands Stadium
86a	Russell & Bourke Streets, City	Harbour Town Shopping Centre	Victoria Harbour

== List of discontinued routes ==
Some Melbourne tram routes have been discontinued or replaced. Tram routes that ran short-workings or temporary routes are not included. Routes changed or removed due to the conversion of cable tram lines are also not included.

Route	Terminus A	Terminus B	First service	Last service	Notes
2	Elsternwick	East Brunswick	Pre-1928	25 October 1930	via (Swanston Street)
2	St Kilda Beach & South Melbourne Beach	East Brunswick	26 October 1930	31 October 1970	via South Melbourne and Swanston Street
3A	East Malvern	Melbourne University	31 January 2009	29 October 2023	via St Kilda, ran only on weekends, all services diverted to operate via route 3
4	Carnegie	City Swanston Street	24 June 1934	31 October 1970	Replaced by route 67 following route number revision
4D	East Malvern (Darling Rd)	City Swanston Street	24 June 1934	31 October 1970	Replaced by route 3 following route number revision
7	Camberwell	City (Swanston Street)	21 November 1929	31 October 1970	Replaced by route 72 following route number revision
8	Moreland	Toorak	17 October 2004	30 April 2017	Merged into route 58, change associated with the construction of Metro Tunnel
9	East Preston	City (Collins Street)	16 October 1930	24 July 1937	
9	East Preston	South Melbourne & St Kilda Beach	25 July 1937	16 October 1930	via Collins Street
9	Northcote	South Melbourne & St Kilda Beach	25 June 1955	31 October 1970	via Brunswick Street and Collins Street
9	Northcote	City (Collins Street)	1 November 1970	14 March 1993	via Brunswick Street
9E	East Preston	City (Spencer Street)	28 March 1967	31 October 1970	via Brunswick Street and La Trobe Street, peak hour. Replaced by route 14 when letter suffixes discontinued
10	West Preston	South Melbourne and St Kilda Beach	25 June 1937	29 April 1995	via Collins Street. Discontinued following elimination of shared depot routes
13	West Preston	City (Spencer Street)	August 1968	26 June 1989	via La Trobe Street, discontinued following timetable change at East Preston depot. First use of the numeral 3 in a route number (prior to this the MMTB didn't use the numeral 3 due to potential confusion with the numeral 8)
14	East Preston	City (Spencer Street)	1 November 1970	26 June 1989	via Brunswick Street and La Trobe Street, replaced route 9E when letter suffixes discontinued. Discontinued following timetable change at East Preston depot
15	North Coburg	St Kilda Beach	Pre 1929	25 April 1936	via Swanston Street
15	Moreland	St Kilda Beach	26 April 1936	1 April 1995	via Collins Street. Split into routes 16 and 22 following elimination of shared depot routes
18	Brunswick	City (Elizabeth Street)	1935/1936	?	
20	Coburg	City (Swanston Street)	Pre 1929	1936	
20	Coburg	City (Elizabeth Street)	1936	?	Was a shortened version of route 19
22	Moreland	Arts Centre	1 November 1970	16 October 2004	Merged into route 8 (see above)
23	Mont Albert	City (Spencer Street)	25 September 1972	7 September 2001	via La Trobe Street
24	North Balwyn	City (Spencer Street)	25 September 1972	26 July 2014	via La Trobe Street, discontinued based on the desire to end peak-hour only routes
25	Moreland	Domain Road	2 April 1995	6 October 2000	Extension of route 22 that ran only during morning peaks
27	Hawthorn	City (Spencer Street)	6 June 1934	12 February 1965	Discontinued following when route 74/75 diverted via Bridge Road to Flinders Street when Hawthorn depot closed
31	Hoddle Street	Victoria Harbour	25 September 1972	26 July 2014	Discontinued following network-wide timetable revision
32	Camberwell	City (William Street)	25 September 1972	17 November 1986	Discontinued once through-running on William Street routes ceased
33	Domain Road	City (William Street)	17 November 1986	1995	via William Street. Peak hour variant that gradually fell out of use after the closure of South Melbourne depot
34	East Melbourne	City (Spencer Street)	1995	19 September 2003	Route 30 became full-time
35	Malvern	City (William Street)	25 September 1972	17 November 1986	Discontinued once through-running on William Street routes ceased
36	Glen Iris	City (William Street)	25 September 1972	17 November 1986	Discontinued once through-running on William Street routes ceased
37	Carnegie	City (William Street)	25 September 1972	17 November 1986	Discontinued once through-running on William Street routes ceased
38	Toorak	City (William Street)	25 September 1972	17 November 1986	Discontinued once through-running on William Street routes ceased
42	Mont Albert	City (Collins Street)	6 June 1934	18 December 1993	Merged with route 111 into route 109
55	West Coburg	Domain Interchange	30 April 1995	30 April 2017	Merged into route 58. Change associated with the construction of Metro Tunnel
56	Brunswick West	Domain Interchange	3 February 1946	29 April 1995	Discontinued to fix route number anomaly with route 55
57	Somerville & Williamstown Rds	Ballarat Rd & Rosamond Rd	6 September 1921	10 March 1962	Discontinued on 10 March 1962, when the Footscray Depot closed and trams ceased operation from there, with only the current Route 82, running out of Essendon Depot, remaining.
58	Barkly & Russell Sts	Footscray station	6 September 1921	10 March 1962	Discontinued on 10 March 1962, when the Footscray Depot closed and trams ceased operation from there, with only the current Route 82, running out of Essendon Depot, remaining.
59	Somerville & Williamstown Rds	Footscray station	6 September 1921	10 March 1962	Discontinued on 10 March 1962, when the Footscray Depot closed and trams ceased operation from there, with only the current Route 82, running out of Essendon Depot, remaining.
60	Ballarat & Rosamond Rds	Footscray station	6 September 1921	10 March 1962	Discontinued on 10 March 1962, when the Footscray Depot closed and trams ceased operation from there, with only the current Route 82, running out of Essendon Depot, remaining.
	Gordon & River Sts (Ammunitions Factory)	Footscray station	9 November 1941	1 May 1954	Route ran along Gordon St to River St (also known as the Ammunitions Factory route). On 2 May 1954, it was extended to the Ordnance Factory spur line off Raleigh Rd, to create what is now Route 82 to Moonee Ponds Junction.
68	West Coburg	City (Elizabeth Street)	1 November 1970	31 July 2005	Route 55 began seven-day operation
69	Kew	St Kilda Beach	24 June 1934	15 October 2004	Merged into route 16
74	Burwood	City (Spencer Street)	9 December 1934	18 July 1978	Replaced by route 75 following East Burwood extension
77	Prahran	Batman Avenue	9 December 1934	1 November 1986	Discontinued due to low patronage/cost-saving
79	North Richmond	St Kilda Beach	9 December 1934	26 July 2014	Route 78 became full-time
88	East Preston	City (Bourke Street)	26 June 1955	17 May 1983	Replaced by route 86 following Bundoora extension
95	Exhibition Street	Docklands Stadium	26 June 1955	26 July 2014	Discontinued based on the desire to end peak-hour only routes
111	Exhibition Street	Port Melbourne	20 November 1987	18 December 1993	Merged with route 42 into route 109
112	West Preston	South Melbourne and St Kilda Beach	April 2000	26 July 2014	Split into routes 11 and 12 following network-wide timetable revision
