= Melbourne tram route 22 =

Route 22

Overview
- System: Melbourne
- Operator: Yarra Trams
- Depot: Brunswick
- Vehicle: Z3 class B2 class D1 class
- Began service: 1 November 1970
- Ended service: 16 October 2004

Route
- Start: Moreland
- Via: Brunswick East; Lygon Street; Swanston Street
- End: Arts Centre
- Map: Route 22 map

Melbourne tram route 22 was operated by Yarra Trams on the Melbourne tram network from Moreland to the Arts Centre. The route was operated out of Brunswick depot with Z, B and D1 class trams. It ceased operating on 16 October 2004 and was replaced by an extended Route 8.

== History ==
Route 22 was introduced on 1 November 1970, it ran from Moreland Road, Moreland to the Arts Centre on St Kilda Road.

As part of the privatisation and splitting of Melbourne's tram network in 1997, Route 22 passed into the ownership of M-Tram.

From 1995, Route 22 was also supplemented by the Route 25 tram. The Route 25 ran as a morning peak extension of the Route 22, between Moreland and Domain Road. The Route 25 was discontinued in 2000.

M-Tram was merged with the operator of the other half of tram network, Yarra Trams in April 2004, with all M-Tram routes, including the Route 8 passing into the ownership of Yarra Trams.

Route 22 was discontinued on 16 October 2004. The Route 22 was replaced by an extended Route 8. Route 8 had previously terminated at Melbourne University. The extended Route 8 ran from Moreland to Toorak.

== Operation ==
Routes 22 was operated out of Brunswick depots with Z and B2 class trams.
