= Melbourne tram route 8 =

Former tram route in metropolitan Melbourne, Victoria, Australia

Route 8
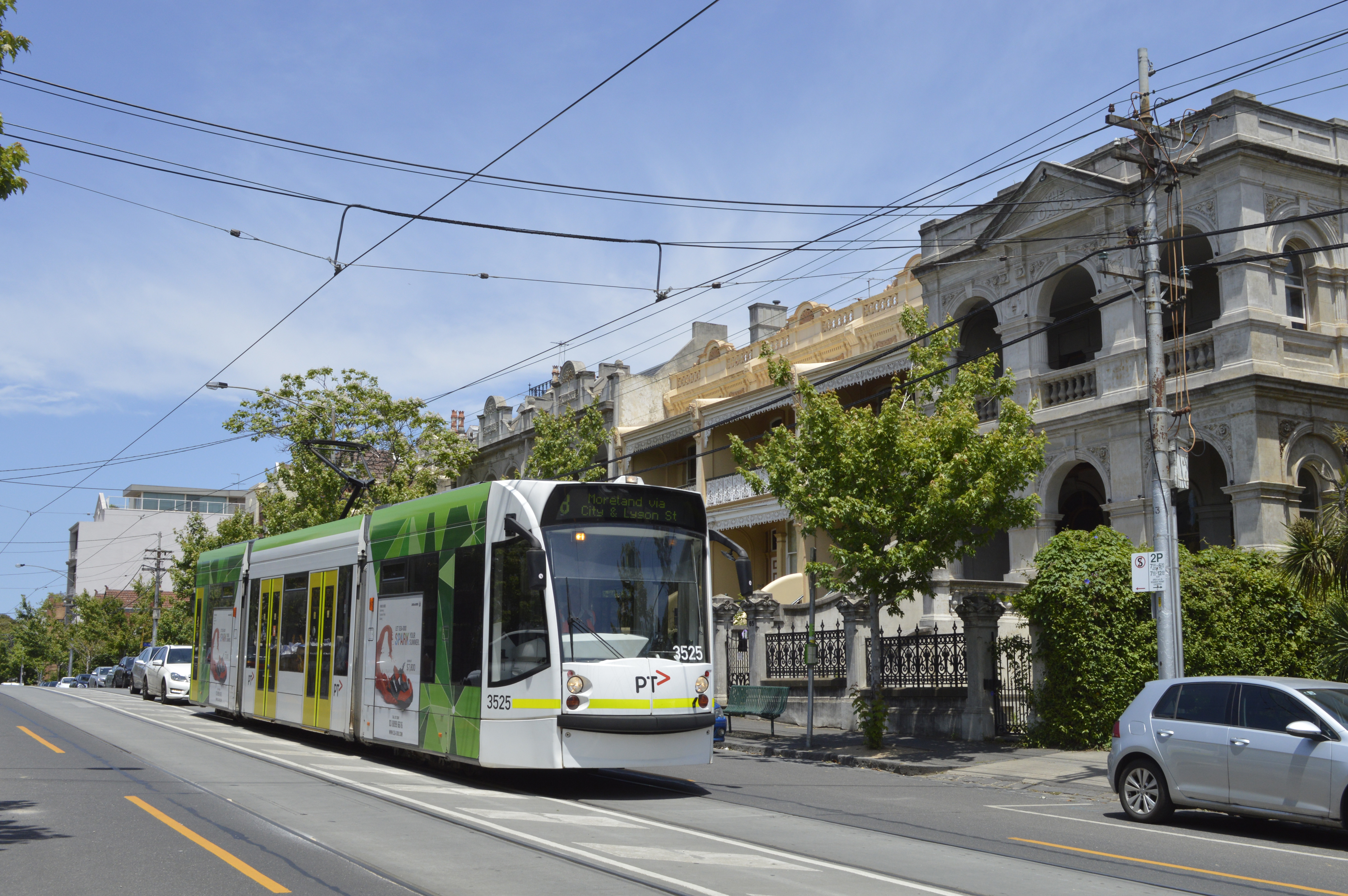
- D1 class tram at South Yarra, December 2016

Overview
- System: Melbourne
- Operator: Yarra Trams
- Depot: Brunswick; Malvern
- Vehicle: Z3 class B2 class D1 class D2 class
- Began service: 17 October 2004
- Ended service: 30 April 2017

Route
- Locale: Melbourne, Australia
- Start: Moreland
- Via: Brunswick East; Lygon Street; Swanston Street; St Kilda Road; South Yarra
- End: Toorak
- Length: 15.7 kilometers
- Timetable: Route 8 timetable
- Map: Route 8 map

Melbourne tram route 8 was operated by Yarra Trams on the Melbourne tram network from Moreland to Toorak. The 15.7 kilometre route was operated out of Brunswick and Malvern depots with Z, B and D1 class trams. It ceased on 30 April 2017 and was replaced by route 6 and route 58.

== History ==
Route 8 started on 17 October 2004, when the old route 8, which had been running between Melbourne University and Toorak merged with route 22 which had been running between Moreland and Arts Precinct.

In February 2015, Yarra Trams released plans to build a centre platform at Toorak, 100 metres west of the existing terminus. The work was completed in December 2015.

On 30 April 2017, as part of works associated with the closure of Domain Interchange and construction of Anzac railway station, route 8 ceased. The southern portion was replaced by extending route 55 from Domain Interchange to Toorak as route 58, while the northern section was replaced by extending route 6 from Melbourne University to Moreland.

Melbourne tram route 8 evolution
Dates	Route	Notes
21 November 1929 - 15 April 1991	City (Victoria Street) to Toorak	
15 April 1991 - 17 January 1996	City (Queensberry/Swanston Street) to Toorak	Some services terminated at Melbourne University
17 January 1996 - 16 October 2004	Melbourne University to Toorak	
17 October 2004 - 30 April 2017	Moreland to Toorak	Replaced by routes 6 and 58

== Operation ==
Routes 8 was operated out of Brunswick and Malvern depots with Z, B and D1 class trams.

From 2016, D2 class trams from Brunswick depot operated on route 8, after the transfer from Southbank to Brunswick of this class to operate route 19.
