= Melbourne tram route 3 =

Tram route in metropolitan Melbourne, Victoria, Australia

Route 3

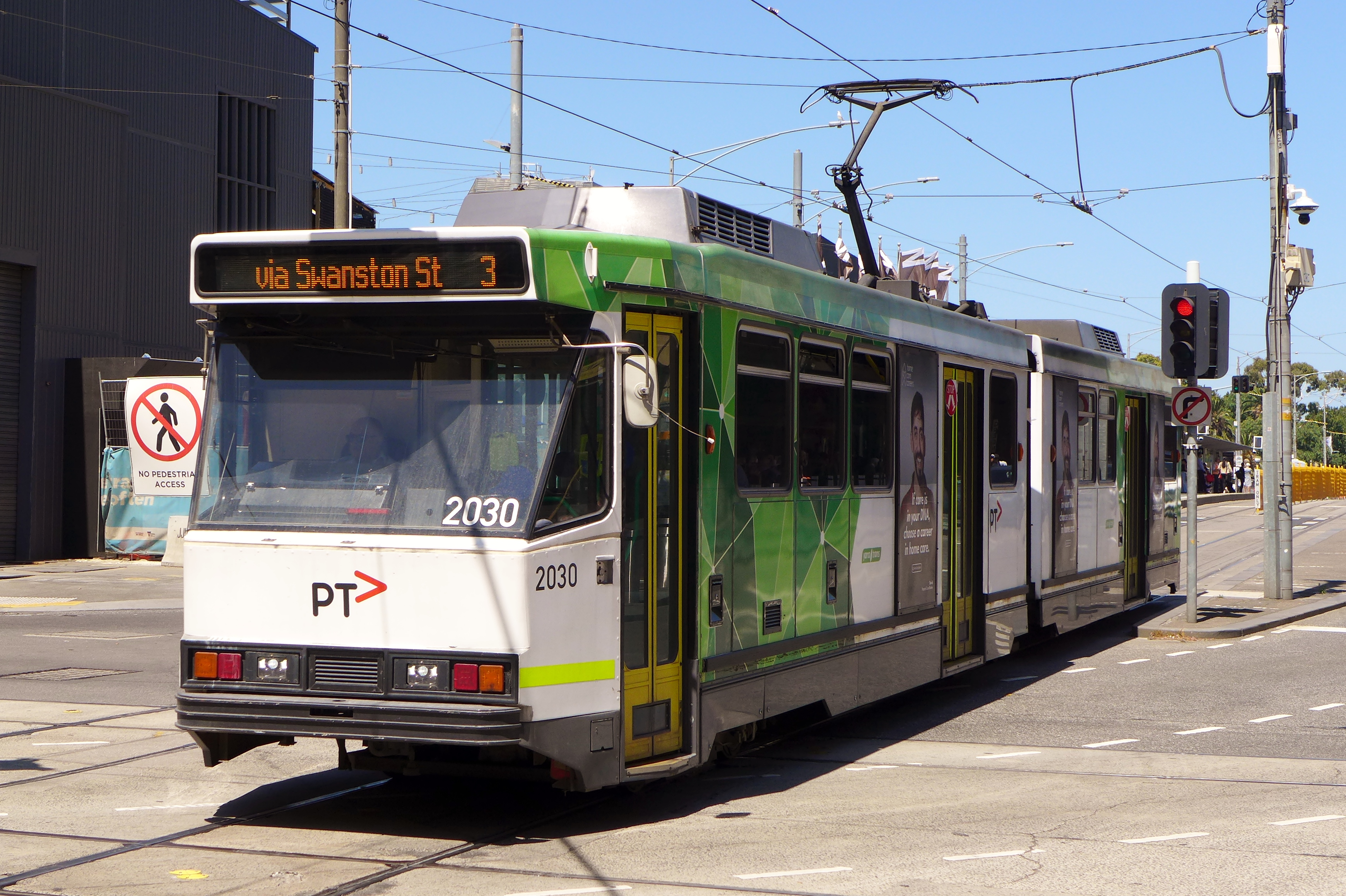
- B class tram on Swanston Street, February 2023

Overview
- System: Melbourne
- Operator: Yarra Trams
- Depot: Glenhuntly
- Vehicle: Z class B class
- Began service: 1 November 1970

Route
- Start: Melbourne University
- Via: Swanston Street; St Kilda Road; Brighton Road; Balaclava; Caulfield
- End: East Malvern
- Length: 14.9 kilometres

Service
- Operates: Weekdays
- Timetable: timetable
- Map: Route 3/3a map

Route 3a

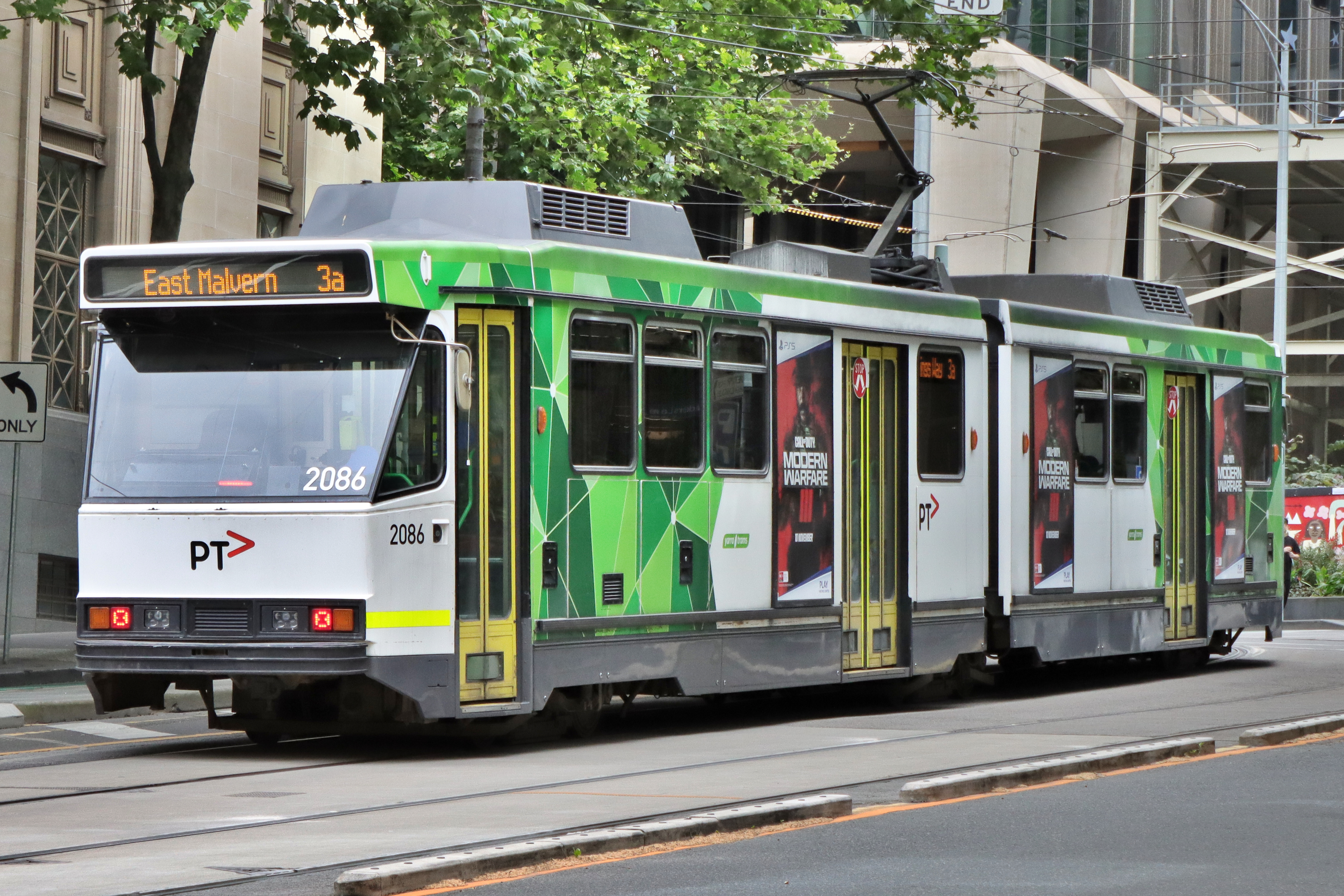
- B class tram on route 3a at the intersection of Flinders Lane and Market Street, November 2023

Overview
- System: Melbourne
- Operator: Yarra Trams
- Depot: Glenhuntly
- Vehicle: Z class B class
- Began service: 31 January 2009
- Ended service: 29 October 2023

Route
- Start: Melbourne University
- Via: Swanston Street; St Kilda Road; St Kilda; Balaclava; Caulfield
- End: East Malvern
- Length: 16.3 kilometres

Service
- Operates: Weekends
- Timetable: timetable
- Map: Route 3/3a map

Melbourne tram route 3 is a tram route on the Melbourne tramway network serving the city of Melbourne in Victoria, Australia. Operated by Yarra Trams, the route is coloured light blue and extends from Melbourne University to East Malvern over 14.9-kilometre (9.3 mi) of double track via Swanston Street, St Kilda Road and Caulfield. It is serviced out of Glenhuntly depot utilising Z and B class trams. Until October 2023, route 3 operated as 3a on weekends, diverting via St Kilda Beach.

== History ==
The origins of route 3 lie in separate tram lines. The section of track between Queensberry Street (Stop 4) and Brighton Road (Stop 35) is the oldest section of this route, dating back to the Brighton Road cable tram which opened on 11 October 1888 by the Melbourne Tramway & Omnibus Company. This cable tram line was electrified in stages by the Melbourne & Metropolitan Tramways Board. The section between Domain Interchange (Stop 20) and St Kilda Junction (Stop 30) was electrified on 27 December 1925. The section between Queensberry Street and City Road (near Stop 14) was electrified on the same day. The line between City Road and Domain Interchange was electrified on 24 January 1926, and the line between St Kilda Junction and Carlisle Street (Stop 35) was finally electrified on 29 August 1926.

The section of route 3 between Brighton Road (Stop 35) and East Malvern (Darling Road) was constructed by the Prahran & Malvern Tramways Trust (PMTT). Initially, a line was opened from St Kilda Beach to Hawthorn Road along Carlisle Street/Balaclava Road on 12 April 1913. This line was extended east by the PMTT from Hawthorn Road to Darling Road, East Malvern on 13 November 1913. Meanwhile, the Melbourne, Brunswick & Coburg Tramways Trust (MBCTT) constructed the section of Route 3 north of Queensberry Street towards Melbourne University. This section opened on 31 October 1916.

On 12 November 1961, trams operating on Route 3 (Route 4D before 1970) on Sunday were replaced by bus route 377 to save operating costs. Sunday trams were reinstated on 8 August 1993 following the abolition of conductors.

Route 3 was allocated to the line between the City (Swanston Street) to East Malvern (Darling Road) on 1 November 1970 following a major route number revision for trams running on Swanston Street. Prior to this, the line was run by Route 4D, an allocation that dates back to 1930. Trams traditionally terminated at the Victoria Street terminus, but following an accident in 1991, trams instead terminated at the Queensberry Street crossover. Due to congestion during peak hours at the crossover, some trams continued north to the Melbourne University. Finally on 17 January 1996, a permanent shunt was built at Melbourne University. From then on, route 3 trams were altered run full-time to Melbourne University.

During the 2006 Commonwealth Games, the route was renumbered 53 and extended to West Coburg during peak hour and the Dudley Street sidings during off peak, from Domain Interchange, along route 55 to alleviate congestion along St Kilda Road.

On 31 January 2009, route 3 was altered on the weekends to form route 3a, diverting from the regular route at St Kilda Junction and travelling via Fitzroy Street, The Esplanade and Carlisle Street to rejoin the regular route at the corner of St Kilda Road and Carlisle Street. This was to alleviate overcrowding on route 16. Route 3a ceased operations after 29 October 2023, and all services operate as route 3 throughout the week.

=== Route 3a weekend variation ===
Between 31 January 2009 and 29 October 2023, on weekends, route 3 ran as route 3a, diverting from the regular route at St Kilda Junction and travelling via St Kilda on Fitzroy Street, The Esplanade and Carlisle Street, passing St Kilda Beach and Luna Park before rejoining the regular route at the corner of St Kilda Road and Carlisle Street.

Short-working or diverted trips of route 3 continue to run as route 3a (as with other tram route numbers). However, it is not a dedicated route in its own right.

Melbourne tram route 3 evolution
Dates	Route	Notes
During PMTT operation	St Kilda Road to Malvern tram depot	
1 November 1970 - 15 April 1991	City (Victoria Street) to East Malvern (Darling Road)	Prior to that ran as Route 4D
15 April 1991 - 16 January 1996	City (Queensberry Street / Swanston Street) to East Malvern (Darling Road)	Some services terminated at Melbourne University
17 January 1996 - present	Melbourne University to East Malvern (Darling Road)	

== Route ==
Interactive map of Melbourne tram route 3.

Interactive map of Melbourne tram route 3a.

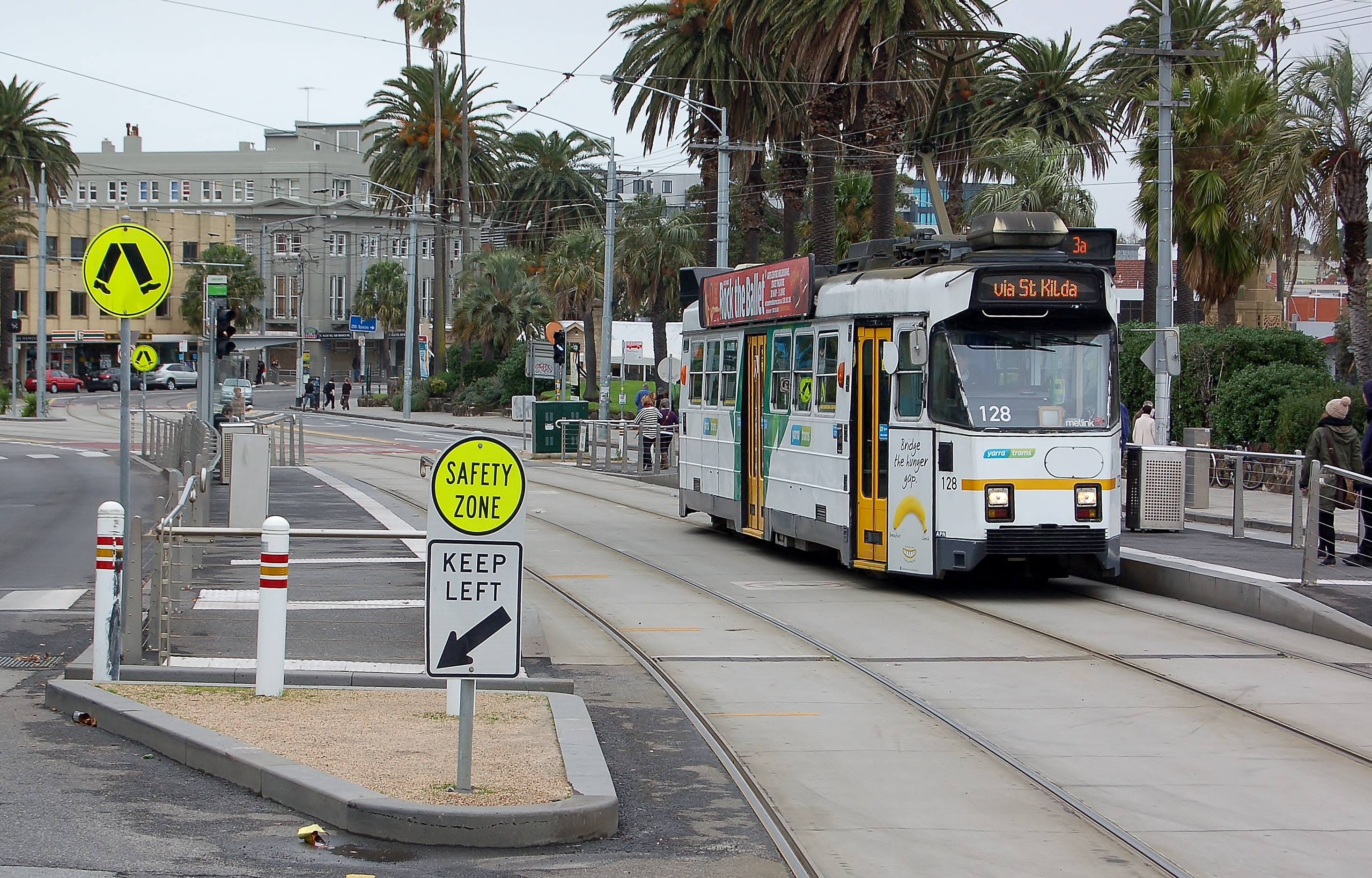
Z class tram on The Esplanade, St Kilda in May 2012

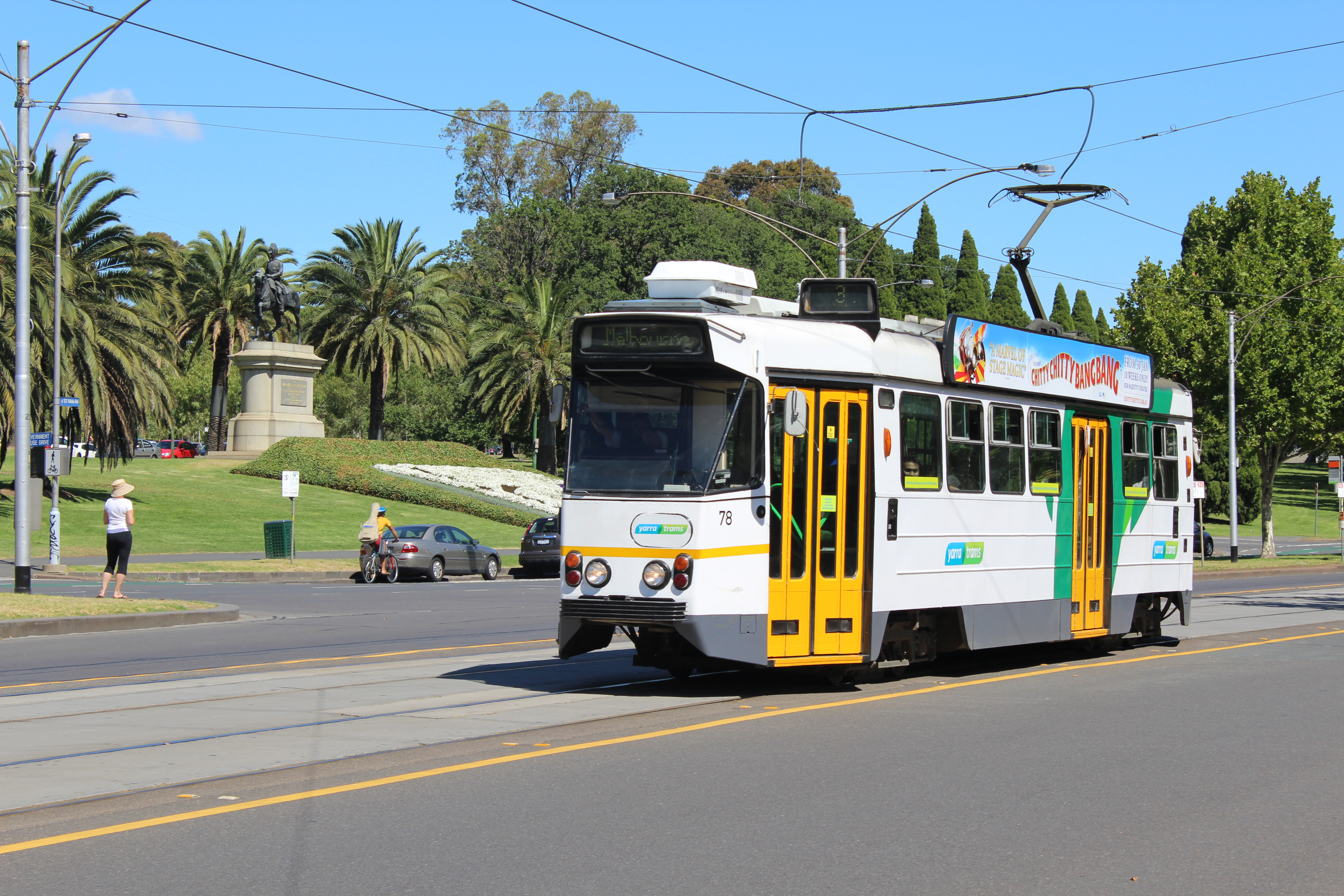
Z class tram on St Kilda Road in February 2013

Route 3 operates from Melbourne University travelling south through the CBD on Swanston Street via Melbourne Central and Flinders Street stations. After crossing the Yarra River it continues south along St Kilda Road turning east into Carlisle Street, Balaclava then travelling through St Kilda East, where Carlisle Street becomes Balaclava Road, continuing east travelling through Caulfield North. After passing Caulfield station, it crosses Dandenong Road, and continues east along Waverley Road, East Malvern, terminating at Darling Road.

== Operation ==
Route 3 (and formerly 3a) is operated out of Glenhuntly depot with Z and B class trams.
