= Melbourne tram route 58 =

Tram route in metropolitan Melbourne, Victoria, Australia

Route 58

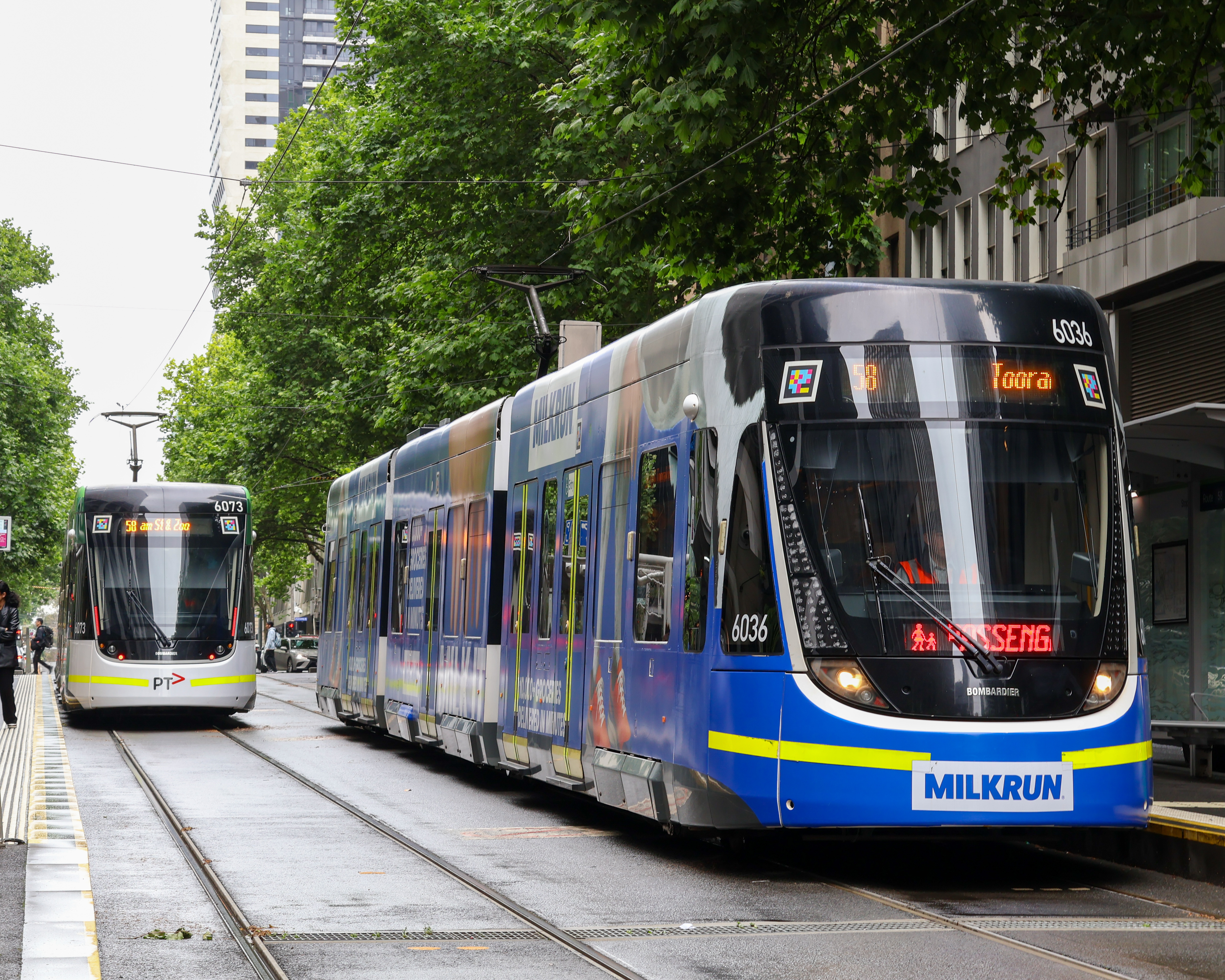
- E class trams at the Collins Street/William Street stop in December 2025

Overview
- System: Melbourne
- Operator: Yarra Trams
- Depot: Essendon; Southbank
- Vehicle: Z class B class E class
- Began service: 1 May 2017
- Predecessors: Route 8 Route 55

Route
- Start: West Coburg
- Via: Brunswick West; Parkville; North Melbourne; West Melbourne; William Street; Southbank; South Yarra
- End: Toorak
- Length: 18.0 kilometres
- Timetable: Route 58 timetable
- Map: Route 58 map

Melbourne tram route 58 is a tram route on the Melbourne tramway network serving the city of Melbourne in Victoria, Australia. Operated by Yarra Trams, the route is coloured light grey and extends from West Coburg to Toorak over 18.0 kilometre of double track via Brunswick West, Parkville, North Melbourne, West Melbourne, William Street, Southbank and South Yarra. It is serviced out of Essendon and Southbank depots utilising Z, B and E class trams and in the future the G class trams will be introduced.

== History ==
Route 58 was introduced on 1 May 2017 as part of a restructure of the Yarra Trams network to facilitate the closure of Domain Interchange and the construction of Anzac railway station. It replaced route 55 in its entirety from West Coburg to Domain Interchange and the southern part of route 8 from Domain Interchange to Toorak.

The origins of the lines traversed by route 58 lies in separate tram lines. The oldest section of track belongs to the section between Domain Interchange (near Stop 119) and Toorak Road (Stop 22), which dates back to the Brighton Road cable tram line, which opened on 11 October 1888. The section of track between Park Street, South Yarra (near Stop 123) and Chapel Street (Stop 128) was built later that year on 26 October as part of the Prahran cable tram line. The section between Chapel Street and Orrong Road (Stop 134) was built as the Toorak cable tram line, which opened on 15 February 1889. This section was extended by the Melbourne & Metropolitan Tramways Board (MMTB) to Glenferrie Road (Stop 139) on 8 May 1927. Meanwhile, the line between Collins Street (Stop 4) and Daly Street, Brunswick West (Stop 33) was constructed by the MMTB on 19 July 1925. This section was extended to West Coburg on 26 June 1927. The line between Sturt Street (Stop 118) and St Kilda Road was constructed on 27 December 1925. The line connecting Collins Street and Sturt Street finally opened on 21 December 1944. From 1 July 2017, route 58 was rerouted via Toorak Road West with the closure of Domain Road while Anzac railway station was built.

During 2021, tram stop upgrades along the route were undertaken to allow the introduction of E class trams on the route, which commenced operation on 19 December 2021. These replaced D1 class trams from Malvern.

On 10 May 2026, the Victorian Government announced that the G-Class trams would be introduced to this route in the future as part of the $76 million 2026/27 State Budget.

Melbourne tram route 58 evolution
Dates	Route	Notes
c. 1934 - 21 December 1940	Russell Street - Footscray	Never used as single-truck trams used on the line had no number plates
22 December 1940 - 11 May 1943	Unallocated	
12 May 1943 - 30 April 2017	Melbourne Showgrounds to City (Elizabeth Street)	via North Melbourne, short-working of route 57, gradually fell out of use
1 May 2017 - present	West Coburg to Toorak	Merge of routes 8 and 55

== Route map ==
Interactive map of Melbourne tram route 58.
