= Melbourne tram route 1 =

Tram route in metropolitan Melbourne, Victoria, Australia

Route 1

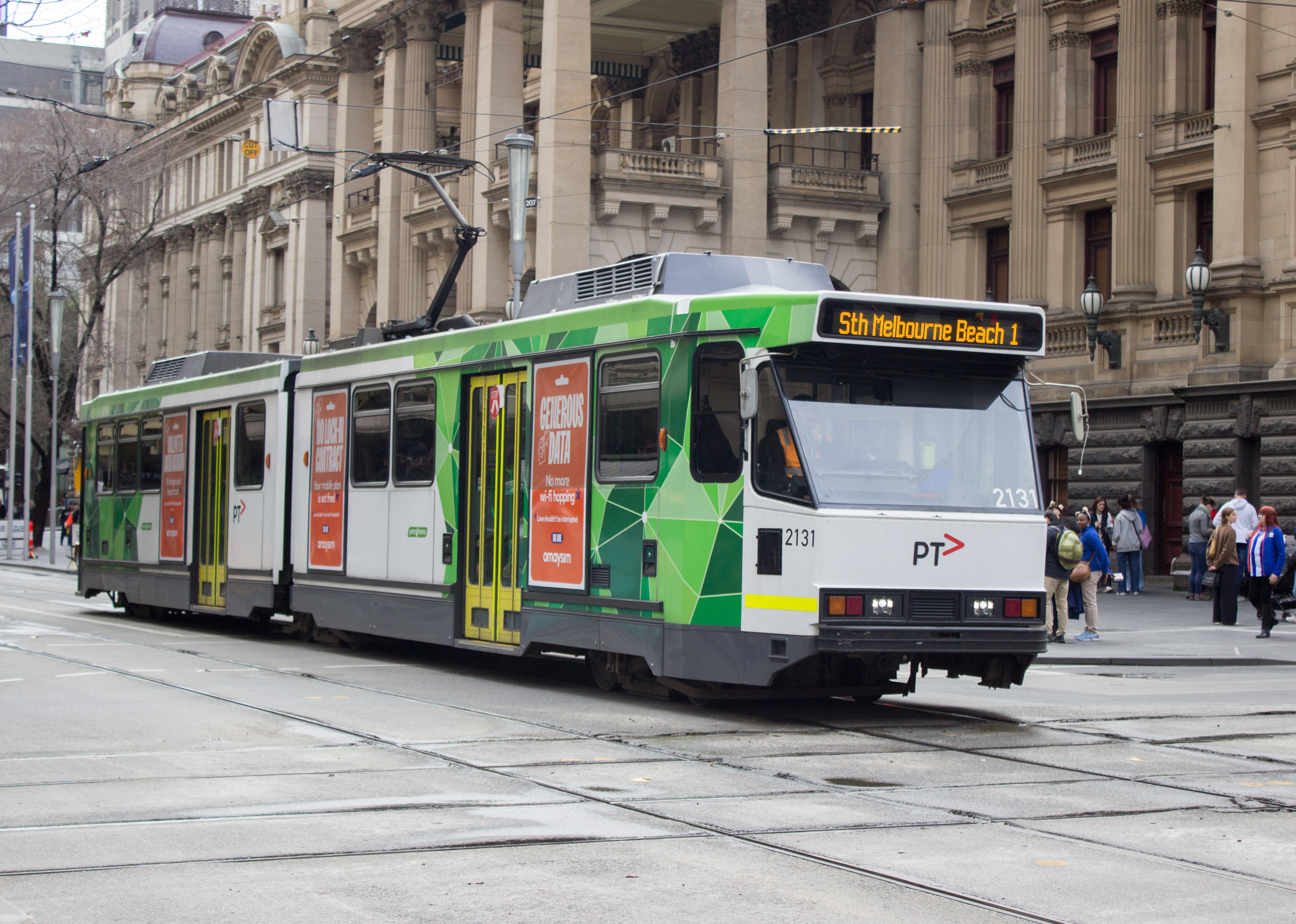
- B class tram crosses the Swanston Street and Collins Street intersection, August 2022

Overview
- System: Melbourne
- Operator: Yarra Trams
- Depot: Brunswick
- Vehicle: Z class B class
- Began service: 13 September 1953

Route
- Start: East Coburg
- Via: Nicholson Street; Lygon Street; Swanston Street; South Melbourne
- End: South Melbourne Beach
- Length: 13.2 kilometres
- Timetable: Route 1 timetable
- Map: Route 1 map

Melbourne tram route 1 is a tram route on the Melbourne tramway network serving the city of Melbourne in Victoria, Australia. Operated by Yarra Trams, the route is coloured light green and extends from East Coburg to South Melbourne Beach over 13.2-kilometre (8.2 mi) of double track via Nicholson Street, Lygon Street, Swanston Street and South Melbourne. It is serviced out of Brunswick depot utilising Z and B class trams.

== History ==
The line between East East Coburg and South Melbourne Beach via Sturt Street was allocated Route 1 on 13 September 1953. However, route 1 had been used on a few different routes prior to this date. When route numbers were introduced into Melbourne's electric tramways as a trial on 19 December 1928, route 1 was allocated to the service between East Coburg and Elsternwick. Following this successful trial, route numbers were permanently allocated to all Swanston Street tram services, route 1 still being allocated to this service. Following the conversion of the Brunswick Street cable tram to electric traction on 26 October 1930, route 1 was reallocated to run between East Coburg and St Kilda Beach via South Melbourne. Trams from East Coburg initially turned left at Clarendon Street to terminate at St Kilda Beach, while trams from Collins Street terminated at South Melbourne Beach. On 13 September 1953, this was amended so that both tram services ran through the junction, resulting in South Melbourne Beach becoming the terminus of route 1.

The origins of route 1 lie in separate tram lines. The section of track between Queensberry Street (Stop 4) and the junction to St Kilda Road (near Stop 14) is the oldest section of this route, dating back to the Brighton Road cable tram line which opened on 11 October 1888 by the Melbourne Tramway & Omnibus Company. This track was converted to electric traction 3 August 1926. The section between Clarendon Street (Stop 24) and Beaconsfield Parade (Stop 32) also dates from the cable era as the South Melbourne line, which opened on 17 June 1890. This section was converted on 25 July 1937. The section north of Queensberry Street until East Coburg was constructed by the Melbourne, Brunswick & Coburg Tramways Trust (MBCTT). Construction of the electric tramway began in June 1914, and on 31 October 1916, East Coburg was connected to Melbourne at Queensberry Street, where the terminus of the Swanston Street cable trams were at the time. On 31 October 1925, the Melbourne & Metropolitan Tramways Board constructed a tram line from St Kilda Beach via South Melbourne to St Kilda Road at City Road. Route 1 traverses the section of this line between Clarendon Street and St Kilda Road. As part of the City Road and St Kilda Road separation project, the northernmost section of track along Sturt Street was relocated to Nolan Street (now Southbank Boulevard) on 16 March 1970.

For a long time, the section between Moreland Road (Stop 129) and East Coburg was built by the MBCTT with a single track and crossing loops. The section between Moreland Road and Crozier Street (Stop 132) was eventually duplicated on 2 May 1927. A siding was constructed at the Bell Street terminus on 3 July 1928. The section of track north of Crozier Street was finally duplicated on 12 December 1966.

Prior to short-working route rationalisation by Yarra Trams in 2014, Route 1 had many short-working routes. From route 1's inception, route 2 and route 2A were used for services from South Melbourne Beach that terminated in the city (usually at Victoria Street). Route 21 meanwhile was used for services from East Coburg terminating in the city (Flinders Street or Arts Centre). From 1970 until 1997, route 4 was used for services from both directions terminating at South Melbourne depot. These short-workings have been replaced by either 1a or 1d (for short-workings and depot workings respectively).

Melbourne tram route 1 evolution
Dates	Route	Notes
During PMTT operation	Malvern (Burke Road) to St Kilda Road	Wattletree Road/Glenferrie Road/High Street
19 December 1928 – 10 October 1930	East Coburg to Elsternwick	
10 October 1930 – 13 September 1953	East Coburg to St Kilda Beach	via South Melbourne
13 September 1953 – present	East Coburg to South Melbourne Beach	Rerouted via Southbank Boulevard 16 March 1970

== Route ==
Interactive map of Melbourne tram route 1.

Route 1 commences at the corner of Nicholson and Bell Streets at Coburg, travelling south via Nicholson Street to Brunswick East where Nicholson Street becomes Holmes Street.

It continues south to Albion Street where it doglegs into Lygon Street, continuing south through Carlton North and Carlton, turning west into Elgin Street and south into Swanston Street at Melbourne University.

It passes south through the CBD on Swanston Street via Melbourne Central station and Flinders Street stations. After crossing the Yarra River it continues south along St Kilda Road, passing The Arts Centre and National Gallery of Victoria before turning west into Southbank Boulevard, quickly turning south onto Sturt Street, passing the Melbourne Recital Hall and Victorian College of the Arts. It briefly travels south on Eastern Road and Heather Street to Park Street, South Melbourne where it travels west to Montague Street Albert Park, and travels south, turning west into Bridport Street and continuing to its terminus in Victoria Avenue at Beaconsfield Parade.

== Operation ==
Route 1 is operated out of Brunswick depot with Z and B class trams. Brunswick shared operation of the route with South Melbourne depot until 2 April 1995.
