= Melbourne tram route 5 =

Tram route in metropolitan Melbourne, Victoria, Australia

Route 5

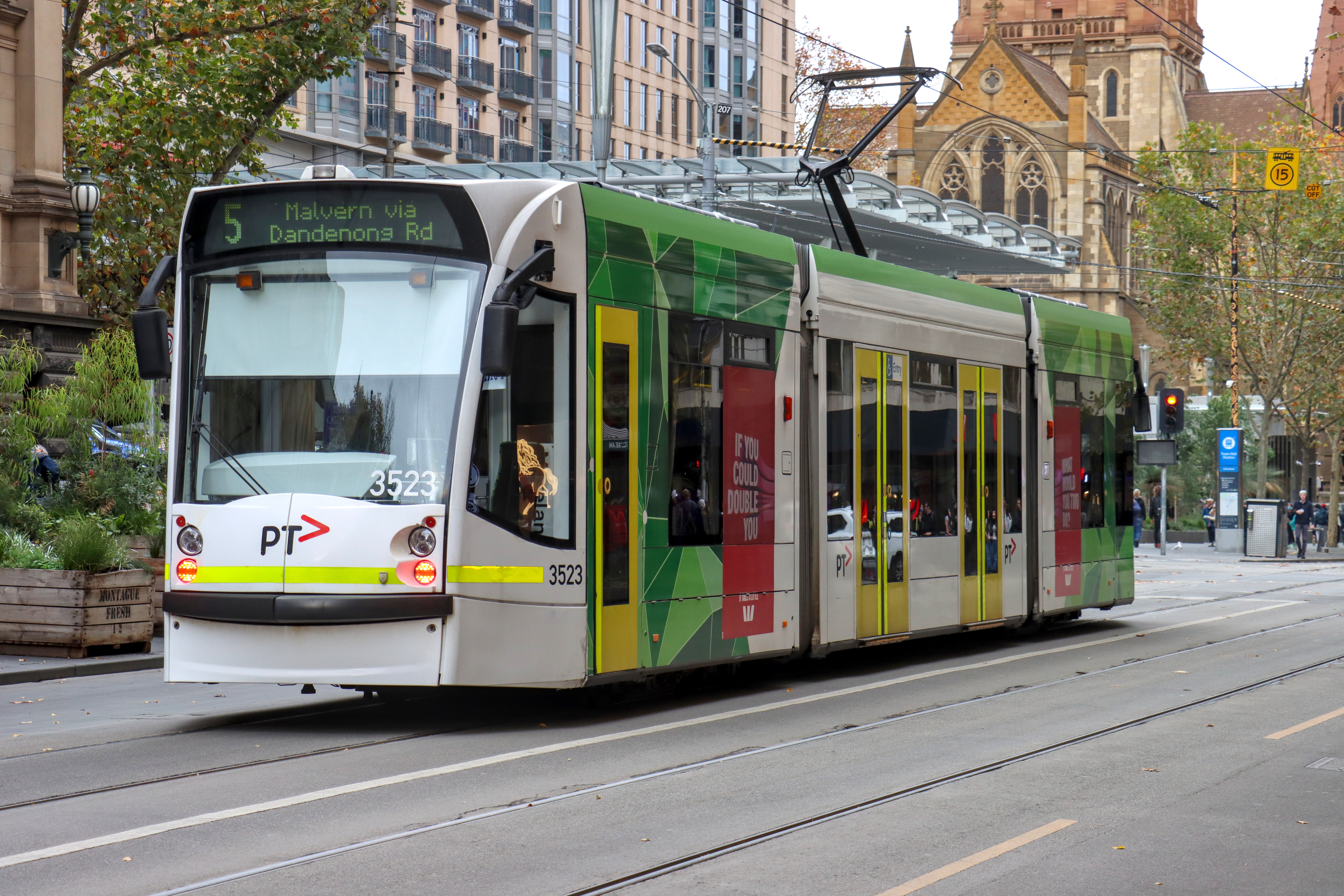
- D-class tram on Swanston Street in May 2026

Overview
- System: Melbourne
- Operator: Yarra Trams
- Depot: Malvern
- Vehicle: Z class D1 class
- Began service: 21 November 1929

Route
- Start: Melbourne University
- Via: Swanston Street; St Kilda Road; Dandenong Road; Malvern East
- End: Malvern
- Length: 12.6 kilometres (7.8 mi)
- Timetable: Route 5 timetable
- Map: Route 5 map

Melbourne tram route 5 is a tram route on the Melbourne tramway network serving the city of Melbourne in Victoria, Australia. Operated by Yarra Trams, the route is coloured red and extends from Melbourne University to Malvern over 12.6-kilometre (7.8 mi) of double track via Swanston Street, St Kilda Road, Dandenong Road and Malvern East. It is serviced out of Malvern depot utilising Z and D1 class trams.

== History ==
Route 5 was allocated to the line between Malvern (Burke Road) and City (Swanston Street) on 21 November 1929, the same day that numbers were allocated to the rest of the Swanston Street trams. Trams traditionally terminated at the Victoria Street terminus, but following an accident in 1991, trams instead terminated at the Queensberry Street crossover. Due to congestion during peak hours at the crossover, some trams continued north to Melbourne University. Finally on 17 January 1996, a permanent shunt was built at Melbourne University. From then on, route 5 trams were altered run full-time to Melbourne University.

The origins of route 5 lie in separate tram lines. The section of track between Queensberry Street (Stop 4) and St Kilda Junction (Stop 30) is the oldest section of this route, dating back to the Brighton Road cable tram which opened on 11 October 1888 by the Melbourne Tramway & Omnibus Company. This cable tram line was electrified in stages by the Melbourne & Metropolitan Tramways Board (MMTB). The section between Domain Interchange (Stop 20) and St Kilda Junction (Stop 30) was electrified on 27 December 1925. The section between Queensberry Street and City Road (near Stop 14) was electrified on the same day. The line between City Road and Domain Interchange was electrified on 24 January 1926. The section between St Kilda Junction and Chapel Street (Stop 32) also dates back to the cable era, as the Windsor to St Kilda Esplanade cable tramway which opened on 17 October 1891. This section was one of the first cable trams to be converted to electric traction on 27 December 1925.

The line east of Hawthorn Road (Stop 45) until the Malvern (Burke Road) terminus was one of the original lines constructed by the Prahran & Malvern Tramways Trust (PMTT), which opened on 30 May 1910. The PMTT also built the section between the Sandringham railway line (near Stop 33) and Wattletree Road (Stop 40), opening on 16 December 1911. This line was extended to Chapel Street (Stop 32) on 31 March 1912.

On 24 June 1928, the MMTB constructed a small section of track between Wattletree Road and Glenferrie Road, giving a more direct route from Burke Road to St Kilda Junction.

As part of the St Kilda Junction separation works, the Wellington Street section was abandoned for a new section of track along the newly built Queens Way on 4 November 1968.

During the 2006 Commonwealth Games, the route was merged with route 55 to West Coburg at Domain Interchange to alleviate congestion along St Kilda Road.

Until 29 October 2023, the entire route only operated until 19:00, after which the route ran shuttle between Dandenong Road and Malvern. From 30 October 2023, route 5 was converted to full day operations along the entire route.

Melbourne tram route 5 evolution
Dates	Route	Notes
During PMTT operation	Victoria Bridge to Riversdale Road	
21 November 1929 - 15 April 1991	City (Victoria Street) to Malvern (Burke Road)	Rerouted via Queens Way on 11 April 1968
15 April 1991 - 17 January 1996	City (Queensberry Street / Swanston Street) to Malvern (Burke Road)	Some services terminated at Melbourne University
17 January 1996 - present	Melbourne University to Malvern (Burke Road)	

== Route ==
Interactive map of Melbourne tram route 5.

Route 5 operates from Melbourne University travelling south through the CBD on Swanston Street via Melbourne Central station and Flinders Street stations. After crossing the Yarra River it continues south along St Kilda Road to St Kilda Junction, where it descends to Queens Way, Windsor and heads east, at Chapel Street, Queens Way becomes Dandenong Road. It continues east passing through Prahran, Armadale, Malvern and Malvern East to its terminus at Burke Road.

== Operation ==
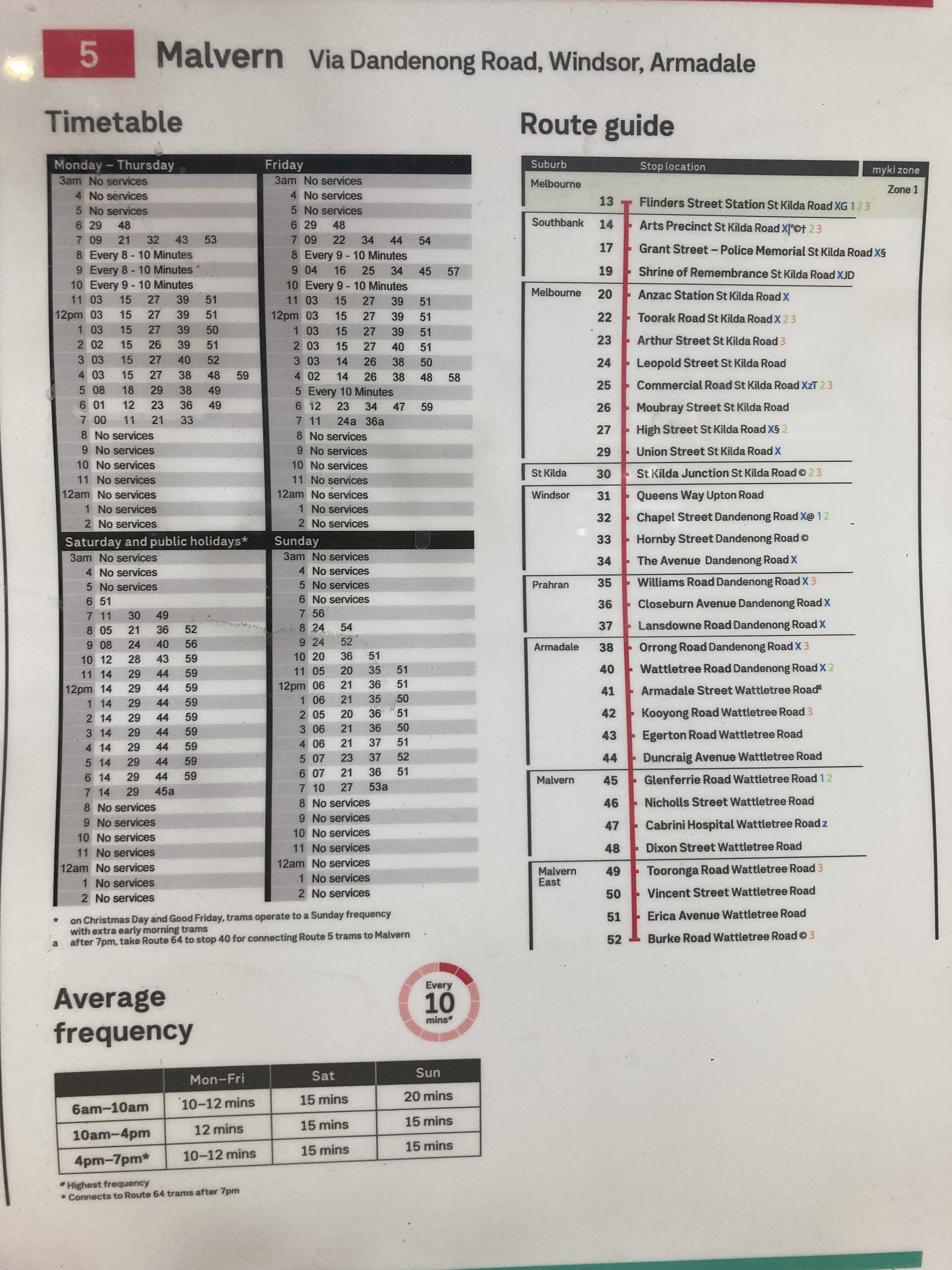
Timetable of route 5 at the Flinders Street station tram stop, instructing passengers to take route 64 and connect with route 5 services after 19:00

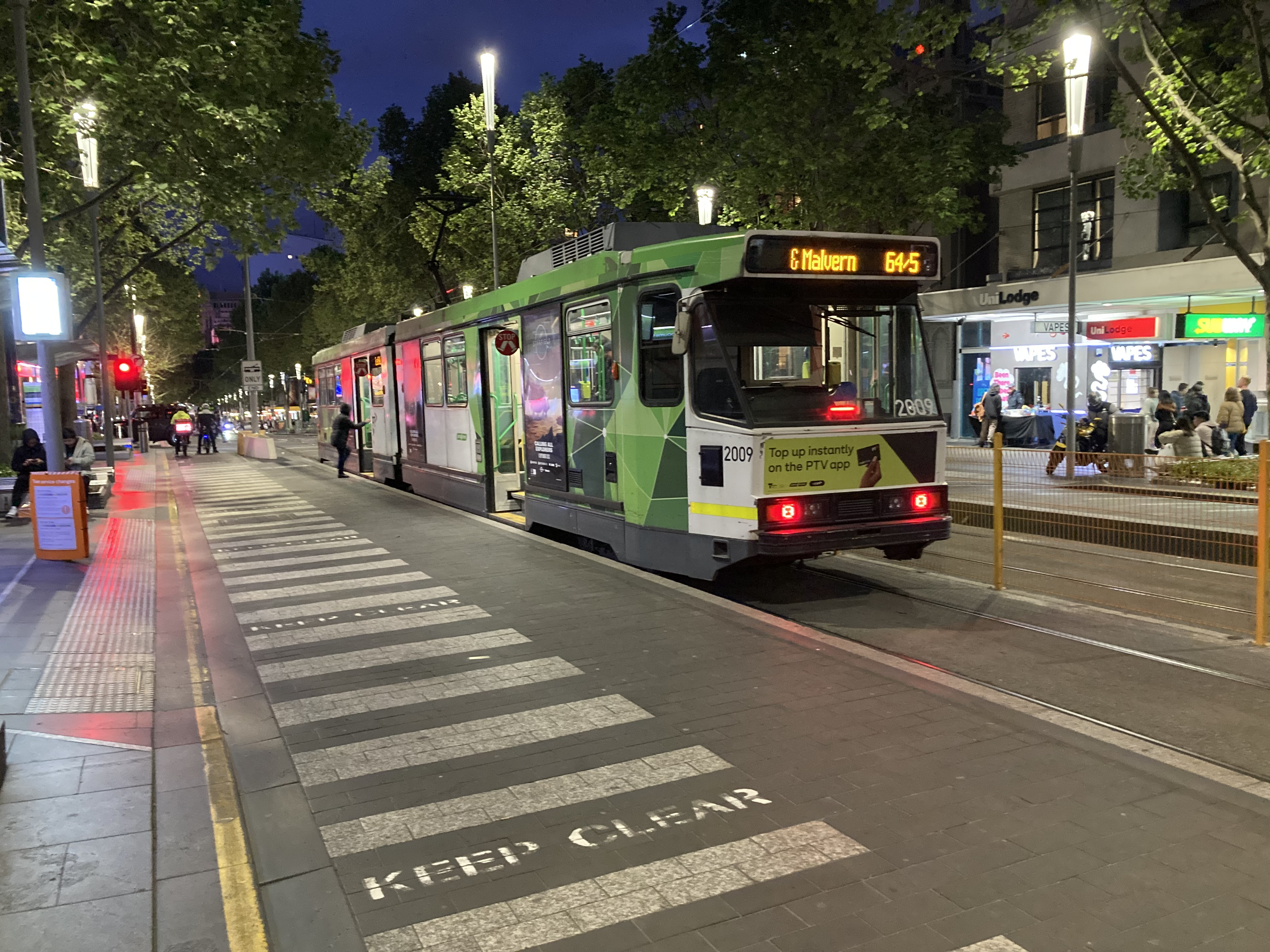
B-class tram on route 64 displaying the 64/5 route number and "& Malvern" in an evening of October 2023

Route 5 is operated out of Malvern depot with Z and D1 class trams. It is occasionally operated by D2 class trams.

Until 29 October 2023, from 19:00 the service only operated between Dandenong Road / Wattletree Road and Malvern, with services timetabled to connect with route 64 services, displayed as Route 64/5.

Since 30 October 2023, the evening operations swapped with route 64, with route 5 running low-floor trams along the entire route throughout the evening, and route 64 running shuttle between Dandenong Road / Wattle Tree Road and Brighton East after 18:30.
