= South Melbourne tram depot =

Location
- Location: Kings Way, South Melbourne

Characteristics
- Owner: Public Transport Corporation
- Operator: Public Transport Corporation

History
- Opened: 1925
- Closed: 8 February 1997
- Former depot code: A

South Melbourne tram depot was a depot on the Melbourne tram network, located on the corner of Kings Way and Dorcas Street, South Melbourne. It was opened in 1925 by the Melbourne & Metropolitan Tramways Board, as Hanna Street. In September 1960, it was renamed South Melbourne.

On 25 June 1967, live vision of W class trams leaving the depot in the early morning featured on the Our World international TV program.

The depot closed on 8 February 1997, with operations being transferred to the new Southbank depot, except for route 16, which was transferred to Malvern depot. Trams continued to visit the South Melbourne depot for a few months to use the wheel lathe. In November 1997, the 2.8-hectare (6.9-acre) site was sold to developer Renak Holdings for $19 million. The buildings were demolished in June 1998 and the area redeveloped as office accommodation.
