= Melbourne tram route 19 =

Tram route in metropolitan Melbourne, Victoria, Australia

Route 19

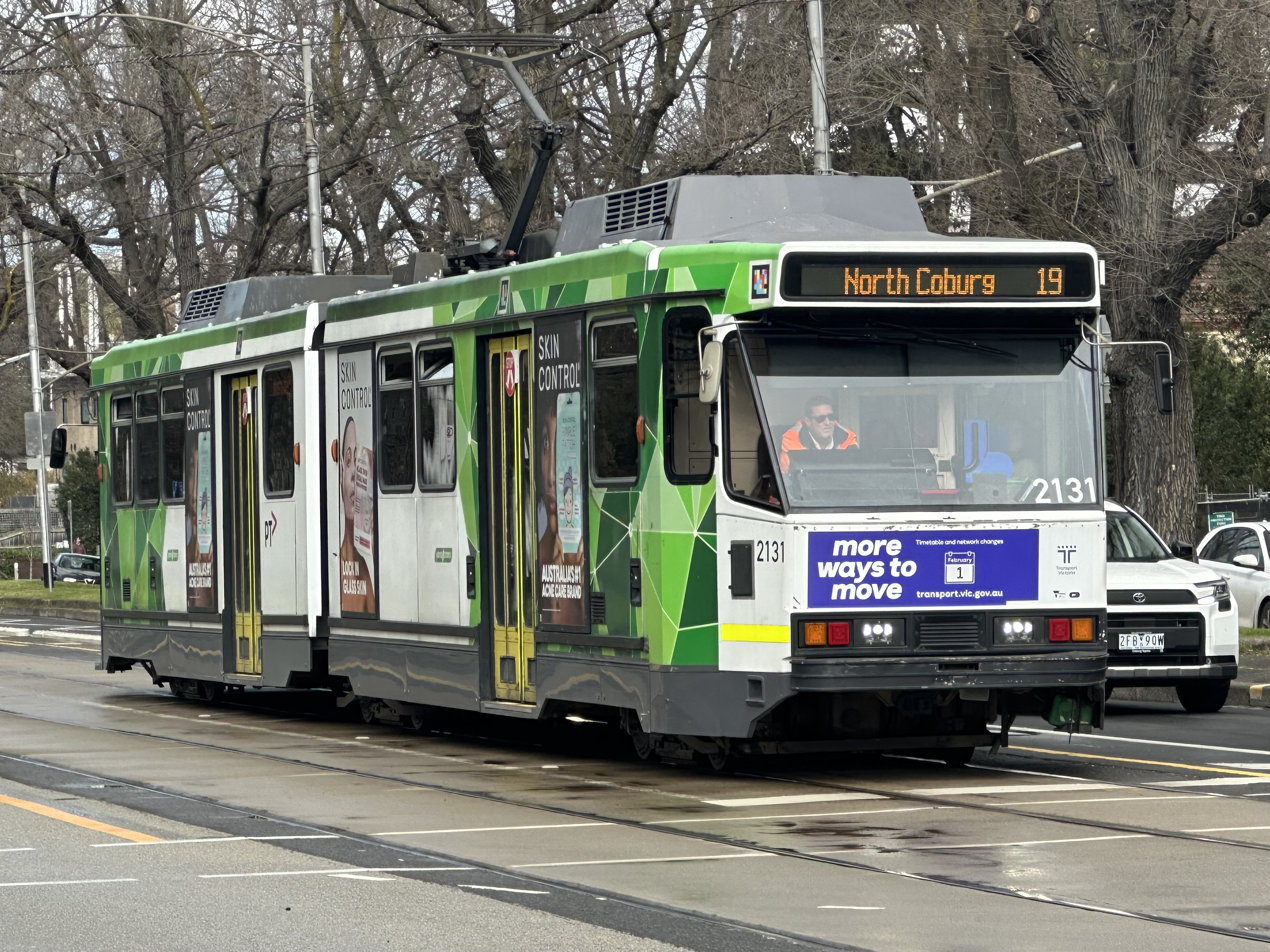
- B2.2131 on Royal Parade in July 2026

Overview
- System: Melbourne tramway network
- Operator: Yarra Trams
- Depot: Brunswick
- Vehicle: B class D2 class
- Began service: 26 April 1936
- Night-time: Friday & Saturday

Route
- Start: North Coburg
- Via: Sydney Road; Royal Parade; Elizabeth Street
- End: Flinders Street station
- Length: 10.2 kilometres
- Timetable: Route 19 timetable
- Map: Route 19 map

Melbourne tram route 19 is a tram route on the Melbourne tramway network serving the city of Melbourne in Victoria, Australia. Operated by Yarra Trams, the route is coloured light purple and extends from North Coburg to Flinders Street station over 10.2 kilometre of double track via Sydney Road, Royal Parade and Elizabeth Street. It is serviced out of Brunswick depot utilising B and D2 class trams.

== History ==
Route 19 was first allocated to the line between Coburg North and the City terminus at Elizabeth Street opposite Flinders Street station on 26 April 1936 following the electrification of the Brunswick cable tram line. Prior to that, Sydney Road trams would run via Moreland Road to Swanston Street and the southern suburbs. Route 19 was allocated to the line between Coburg North and the City – Swanston Street near Flinders Street station. Since 1936, Route 19 has remained on the route between Coburg North and the City (Elizabeth Street). An extension to Fawkner was first planned by the Melbourne, Brunswick & Coburg Tramways Trust (MBCTT) in 1916, but never came to fruition. This extension has been brought up since, most recently by the Victorian Greens during the 2010 state election.

The origin of Route 19 dates back to the Brunswick cable tram line while the section north of Moreland Road was constructed by the MBCTT. The Melbourne Tramway & Omnibus Company opened the Brunswick cable tram line on 1 October 1887, which encompasses the section of route 19 between Moreland Road (Stop 28) and Flinders Street station (Stop 1). This line was electrified by the Melbourne & Metropolitan Tramways Board in stages through 1935–36. The section between Flinders Street station and Victoria Street (near Stop 7) was first electrified on 17 November 1935. The section to Haymarket (Stop 9) was electrified on 29 December in the same year. The electric track was extended to Leonard Street (Stop 15) on 12 January 1936, and then to Park Street (near Stop 19) on 23 February 1936. The final section to Moreland Road was electrified on 26 April 1936. Meanwhile, the track between Moreland Road and Bell Street (Stop 34) was opened by the MBCTT on 27 April 1916, while the rest of the line to Bakers Road (Stop 40) opened on 14 May 1916.

In January 2016, route 19 began operating through the night on Fridays and Saturdays as part of the Night Network.

Melbourne tram route 19 evolution
Dates	Route	Notes
21 November 1929 – 25 April 1936	Coburg North to Swanston Street	via Moreland Road and Lygon Street
26 April 1936 – present	Coburg North to Flinders Street station	via Elizabeth Street

== Operation ==
Route 19 is operated out of Brunswick depot with B and D2 class trams. Occasionally, D1 class trams and Z3 class trams are also used.

== Route map ==
Interactive map of Melbourne tram route 19.
