= Melbourne tram route 16 =

Tram route in metropolitan Melbourne, Victoria, Australia

Route 16

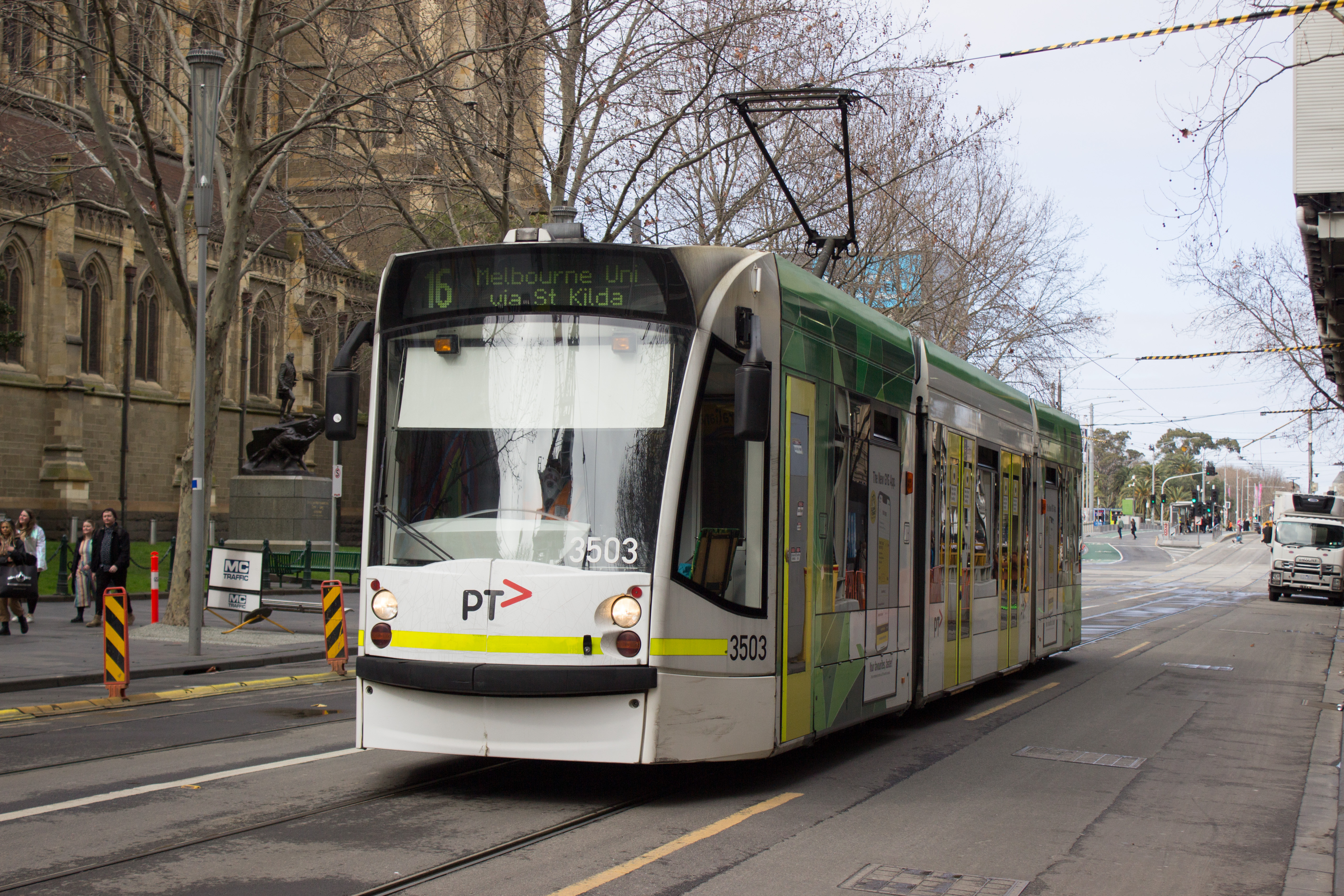
- D1 class tram on Swanston Street, August 2022

Overview
- System: Melbourne
- Operator: Yarra Trams
- Depot: Malvern
- Vehicle: Z class D1 class
- Began service: 26 April 1936

Route
- Start: Melbourne University
- Via: Swanston Street; St Kilda Road; Fitzroy Street; The Esplanade; Balaclava Road; Glenferrie Road
- End: Kew
- Length: 20.2 kilometres
- Timetable: Route 16 timetable
- Map: Route 16 map

Melbourne tram route 16 is a tram route on the Melbourne tramway network serving the city of Melbourne in Victoria, Australia. Operated by Yarra Trams, the route is coloured light yellow and extends from Melbourne University to Kew over 20.2 kilometre of double track via Swanston Street, St Kilda Road, Fitzroy Street, The Esplanade, Balaclava Road and Glenferrie Road. It is serviced out of Malvern depot utilising Z and D1 class trams.

== History ==
Route 16 was first allocated to the line between the City (Swanston Street) and St Kilda Beach on 26 April 1936 following the electrification of the Brunswick cable tram line. Prior to that, trams on the northern section of Sydney Road would run via Swanston Street to the southern suburbs. Route 16 ran the service between Coburg and St Kilda Beach. After 1936, trams traditionally terminated at the Victoria Street terminus, but following an accident in 1991, trams instead terminated at the Queensberry Street crossover. Due to congestion during peak hours at the crossover, some trams continued north to Melbourne University. Finally on 17 January 1996, a permanent shunt was built at Melbourne University. From then on, route 16 trams were altered run full-time to Melbourne University. Traditionally, Route 16 ran between St Kilda Beach to a City terminus along Swanston Street, but most services would in fact continue north to Moreland as route 15. However, following the elimination of shared depot routes on 2 April 1995, route 15 was discontinued, and routes 16 and 22 were amended to run full-time. On 16 October 2004, route 16 was amalgamated with route 69 to run between Melbourne University and Kew (Cotham Road) via St Kilda Beach.

The origins of route 16 lie in separate tram lines. The section of track between Queensberry Street (Stop 4) and St Kilda Junction (Stop 30) is the oldest section of this route, dating back to the Brighton Road cable tram which opened on 11 October 1888 by the Melbourne Tramway & Omnibus Company. This cable tram line was electrified in stages by the Melbourne & Metropolitan Tramways Board. The section between Domain Interchange (Stop 20) and St Kilda Junction (Stop 30) was electrified on 27 December 1925. The section between Queensberry Street and City Road (near Stop 14) was electrified on the same day. The line between City Road and Domain Interchange was electrified on 24 January 1926. Meanwhile, the section between Luna Park (stop 138) and St Kilda Junction was originally the Windsor to St Kilda Beach cable tramway which opened on 27 October 1891. This line was electrified on 27 December 1925.

The line between Luna Park and the terminus at Cotham Road (Stop 80) was all constructed by the Prahran & Malvern Tramways Trust. The track between Wattletree Road (Stop 54) and High Street (Stop 57) was part of the original system which opened on 30 May 1910. The section of track between Hawthorn Road (Stop 48) and Wattletree Road opened on 16 December 1911 as part of the line to Windsor station. The section between Hawthorn Road and Luna Park opened on 12 April 1913, and the line from High Street to the Cotham Road terminus opened on 30 May 1913. Meanwhile, the Melbourne, Brunswick & Coburg Tramways Trust (MBCTT) constructed the section of Route 16 north of Queensberry Street towards Melbourne University. This section opened on 31 October 1916.

In 2007 a Siemens Avenio was trialled for three months on route 16.

Melbourne tram route 16 evolution
Dates	Route	Notes
During PMTT operation	Victoria Bridge to Esplanade	via Glenferrie Road and Balaclava Road
21 November 1929 - 25 April 1936	Coburg to St Kilda Beach	via Swanston Street
26 April 1936 - 14 April 1991	City (Victoria Street) to St Kilda Beach	
15 April 1991 - 16 January 1996	City (Queensberry Street / Swanston Street) to St Kilda Beach	Some services terminated at Melbourne University
17 January 1996 - 16 October 2004	Melbourne University to St Kilda Beach	Operation transferred to Malvern depot from South Melbourne depot on 8 February 1997, merged with route 69 (on weekdays) on 11 December 2000, merged on weekends from 16 October 2004
17 October 2004 - onwards	Melbourne University to Kew (Cotham Road)	via St Kilda Beach

== Operation ==
Route 16 is operated out of Malvern depot with Z and D1 class trams.

== Route map ==
Interactive map of Melbourne tram route 16.
