= Melbourne tram route 72 =

Tram route in metropolitan Melbourne, Victoria, Australia

Route 72

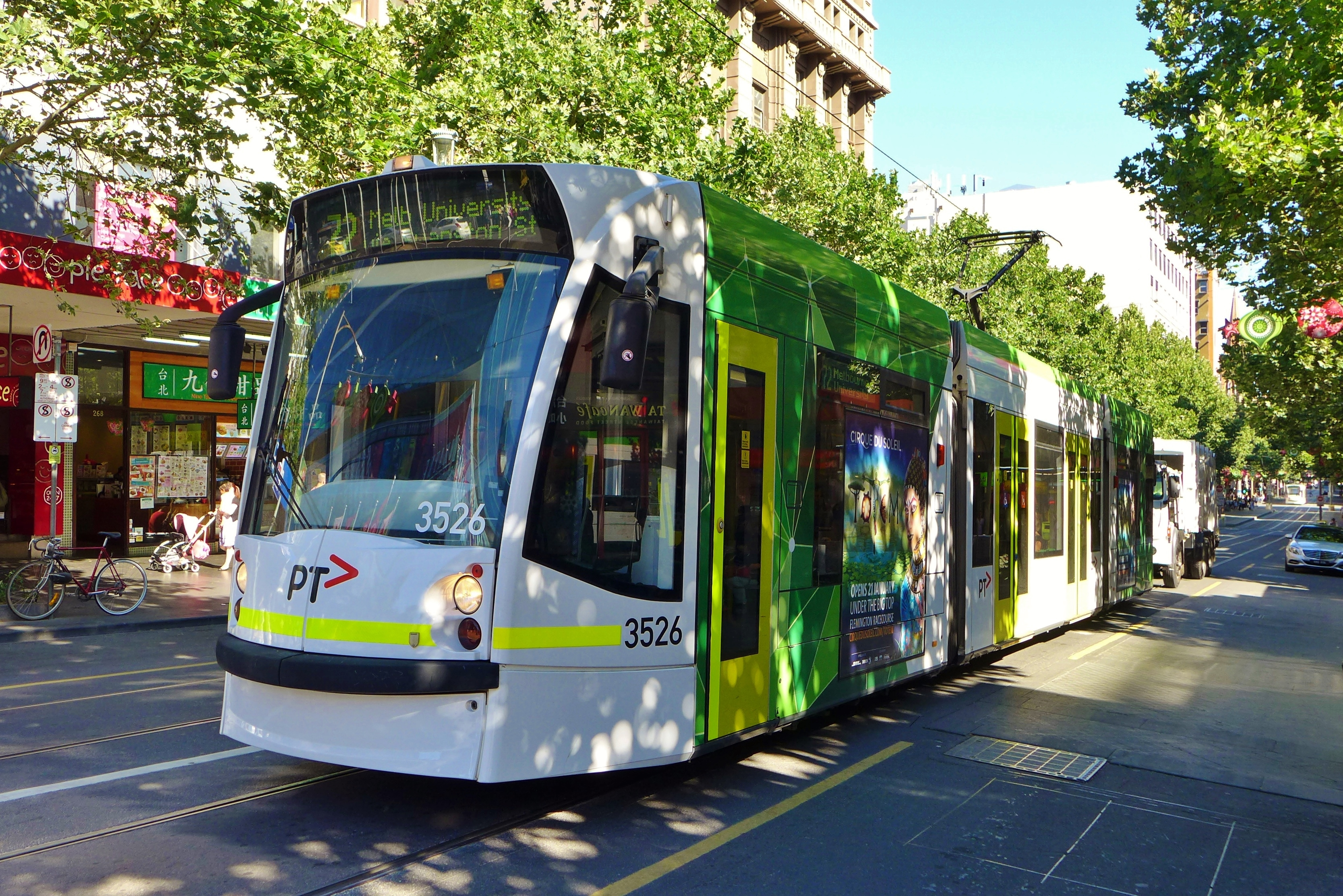
- D1 class tram on Swanston Street, December 2014

Overview
- System: Melbourne
- Operator: Yarra Trams
- Depot: Malvern
- Vehicle: Z class D1 class
- Began service: 1 November 1970

Route
- Start: Melbourne University
- Via: Swanston Street; St Kilda Road; Commercial Road; Malvern Road; Burke Road
- End: Camberwell
- Length: 16.8 kilometres
- Timetable: Route 72 timetable
- Map: Route 72 map

Melbourne tram route 72 is operated by Yarra Trams on the Melbourne tram network from Melbourne University to Camberwell. The 16.8 kilometre route is operated out of Malvern depot with Z and D class trams.

== History ==
Route 72 was first allocated to the line between Camberwell (Burke Road) and the City (Swanston Street) on 1 November 1970. Prior to that, the line to Camberwell was serviced by route 7. The change was at first due to operations of the Camberwell line being shifted from Malvern depot to Camberwell depot. Even though the route was subsequently returned to Malvern in August 1979, the number 72 was kept. Before 1970, Route 72 was a short-working of the Wattle Park line, for trams that terminated at Riversdale instead of Wattle Park. Trams traditionally terminated at the Victoria Street terminus, but following an accident in 1991, trams instead terminated at the Queensberry Street crossover. Due to congestion during peak hours at the crossover, some trams continued north to Melbourne University. Finally on 17 January 1996, a permanent shunt was built at Melbourne University. From then on, route 72 trams were altered run full-time to Melbourne University.

The origins of route 72 lie in separate tram lines. The section of track between Queensberry Street (Stop 4) and Commercial Road (Stop 25) is the oldest section of this route, dating back to the Brighton Road cable tram which opened on 11 October 1888 by the Melbourne Tramway & Omnibus Company. This cable tram line was electrified in stages by the Melbourne & Metropolitan Tramways Board. The section between Domain Interchange (Stop 20) and Commercial Road was electrified on 27 December 1925. The section between Queensberry Street and City Road (near Stop 14) was electrified on the same day. The line between City Road and Domain Interchange was electrified on 24 January 1926. The Prahran & Malvern Tramways Trust constructed the Malvern Road line between St Kilda Road and Gardiner (Stop 50) on 8 April 1915. This line was extended to Camberwell station (Stop 64) on 6 December 1917, and then to Cotham Road on 7 March 1918.

The route was curtailed for 21 months from March 1995 while a bridge was built over the Monash Freeway. In response to the State Government's Melbourne 2030 planning policy, the Public Transport Users Association lobbied to extend route 72 north to Doncaster Road and Ivanhoe station, and south to Caulfield.

Melbourne tram route 72 evolution
Dates	Route	Notes
9 December 1934 - 31 October 1970	Riversdale to City (Batman Avenue)	
1 November 1970 - 14 April 1991	Camberwell to City (Swanston / Victoria Streets)	via Malvern / Burke Roads
15 April 1991 - 16 January 1996	Camberwell to City (Swanston / Queensberry Streets)	via Malvern / Burke Roads
17 January 1996 - onwards	Camberwell to Melbourne University	via Malvern / Burke Roads

== Operation ==
Route 72 is operated out of Malvern depot with Z and D class trams.

== Route map ==
Interactive map of Melbourne tram route 72.
