= Melbourne tram route 6 =

Tram route in metropolitan Melbourne, Victoria, Australia

Route 6

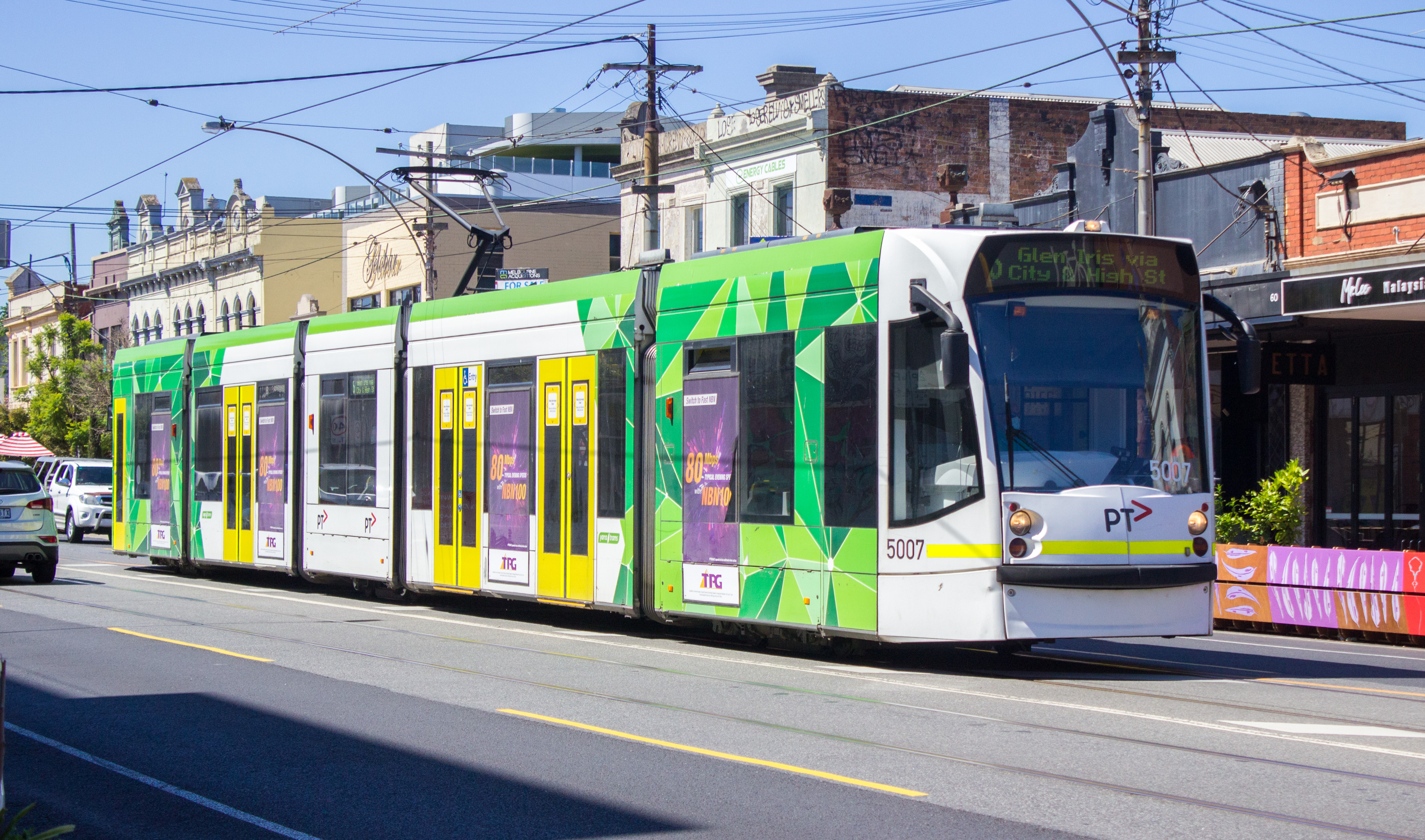
- D2 class tram on Lygon Street, January 2021

Overview
- System: Melbourne
- Operator: Yarra Trams
- Depot: Brunswick; Malvern
- Vehicle: Z3 class D1 class D2 class

Route
- Start: Moreland
- Via: Brunswick East; Lygon Street; Swanston Street; St Kilda Road; Prahran; Malvern East
- End: Glen Iris
- Length: 19.2 kilometres
- Timetable: Route 6 timetable
- Map: Route 6 map

Melbourne tram route 6 is operated by Yarra Trams on the Melbourne tram network from Moreland to Glen Iris. The 19.2-kilometre (11.9 mi) route is operated out of Brunswick and Malvern depots with Z, D1 and D2 class trams.

== History ==
Route 6 was allocated to the line between Glen Iris and City (Swanston Street) on 21 November 1929, the same day that numbers were allocated to the rest of the Swanston Street trams. Trams traditionally terminated at the Victoria Street terminus, but following an accident in 1991, trams instead terminated at the Queensberry Street crossover. Due to congestion during peak hours at the crossover, some trams continued north to Melbourne University. Finally on 17 January 1996, a permanent shunt was built at Melbourne University. From then on, route 6 trams were altered run full-time to Melbourne University.

The origins of route 6 lie in separate tram lines. The section of track between Queensberry Street (Stop 4) and High Street (Stop 27) is the oldest section of this route, dating back to the Brighton Road cable tram which opened on 11 October 1888 by the Melbourne Tramway & Omnibus Company. This cable tram line was electrified in stages by the Melbourne & Metropolitan Tramways Board. The section between Domain Interchange (Stop 20) and High Street was electrified on 27 December 1925. The section between Queensberry Street and City Road (near Stop 14) was electrified on the same day. The line between City Road and Domain Interchange was electrified on 24 January 1926.

The section between Charles Street (near Stop 30) and Tooronga Road (Stop 48) was one of the original lines constructed by the Prahran & Malvern Tramways Trust (PMTT), which opened on 30 May 1910. This line was extended west to Punt Road on 14 March 1911 and again, to St Kilda Road on 14 September 1912, connecting with the St Kilda Road cable tram to the city. The PMTT extended the line again on 25 March 1914, this time east, to its current terminus at Malvern Road. Meanwhile, the Melbourne, Brunswick & Coburg Tramways Trust constructed the section of route 6 north of Queensberry Street towards Moreland. This section opened on 31 October 1916.

In March 2015, as part of works associated with the closure of Domain Interchange and construction of Anzac railway station, a proposal was made to extend the route 6 from Melbourne University to East Coburg, however this plan was later altered to have route 6 terminate at Moreland Station rather than East Coburg. Route 6 was eventually extended from Melbourne University to Moreland to partly replace route 8 on 1 May 2017.

In August 2025, B class trams were removed from route 6 due to a driver roster change, and now are only seen on the route occasionally.

Melbourne tram route 6 evolution
Dates	Route	Notes
During PMTT operation	Victoria Bridge to Esplanade	via Glenferrie / Balaclava Roads
21 November 1929 - 14 April 1991	City (Victoria Street) to Glen Iris	
15 April 1991 - 17 January 1996	City (Queensberry / Swanston Streets) to Glen Iris	Some services terminated at Melbourne University
17 January 1996 - 1 May 2017	Melbourne University to Glen Iris	via Swanston Street
1 May 2017 - present	Moreland to Glen Iris	via Swanston Street

== Route ==
Interactive map of Melbourne tram route 6.

Route 6 operates from Brunswick tram depot travelling east along Moreland Road before turning south along Holmes Street in Brunswick East. It continues south to Albion Street where it doglegs into Lygon Street, continuing south through Carlton North and Carlton, turning west into Elgin Street and south into Swanston Street at Melbourne University. It proceeds south via Melbourne Central station and Flinders Street stations. After crossing the Yarra River it continues south along St Kilda Road. It turns east into High Street, traversing via Prahran, Windsor, Armadale and Malvern to its terminus at Malvern Road, Glen Iris.

== Operation ==
Route 6 is operated out of Brunswick and Malvern depots with Z, D1 and D2 class trams. On 30 November 2002, the first D class trams entered service on the route. B class trams were also used regularly until August 2025.
