= The District Docklands =

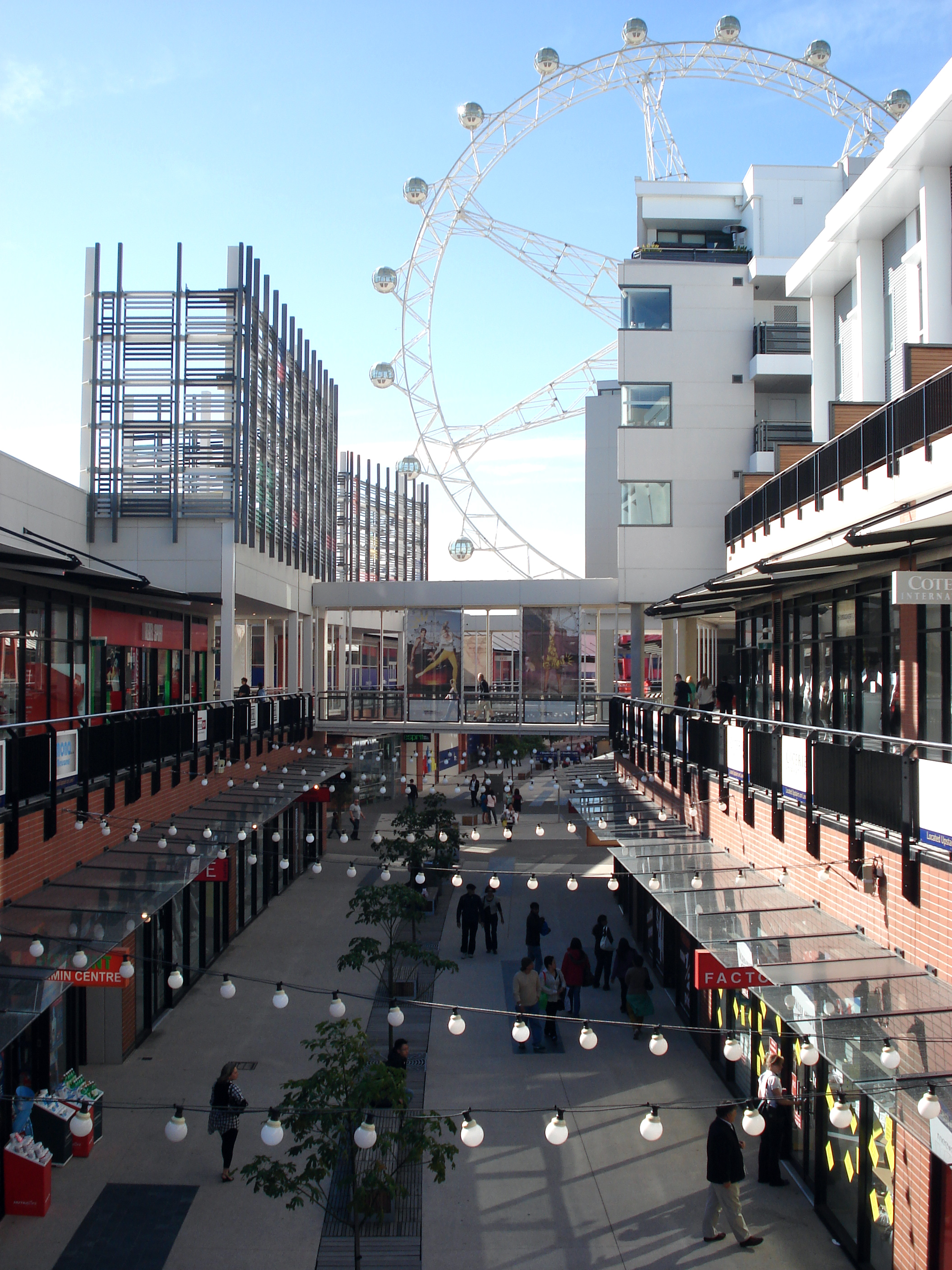
- Interior of The District Docklands looking towards the Southern Star in 2009
- Location: Docklands, Victoria
- Coordinates: 37°48′47″S 144°56′17″E
- Opened: October 21, 2008 (as Harbour Town); 2017 (as The District Docklands)
- Developer: AsheMorgan
- Owner: AsheMorgan
- Num. of stores: 80
- Num. of anchor tenants: 4 (2 currently under construction)
- Floor area: 40,818 m^{2} (439,361 sq ft)
- Floors: 2
- Parking: 2,818 spaces
- Website: www.thedistrictdocklands.com.au

The District Docklands (previously known as Harbour Town) is a mixed-use entertainment precinct in the inner-west of Melbourne.

== History ==
The District Docklands opened on 17 November 2017, formally taking over from Harbour Town. Following the Harbour Town concept, it was owned by ING Real Estate. The District Docklands formally launched over the weekend of 17–19 November 2017, following a $150 million redevelopment and rebrand that repositioned the centre as a mixed-use retail, dining, entertainment and fresh food precinct. The rebrand was announced in August 2017, with the centre described as being redeveloped into a new shopping, dining and entertainment destination. Later expansion plans continued the centre’s evolution into an urban village-style destination in Melbourne’s Docklands.

A $150 million facelift and rebranding to The District Docklands was announced in August 2017. Swedish retail giant H&M signed on as the first retail anchor tenant and is joined by a number of other popular national youth fashion and lifestyle brands. These changes mark the establishment of Melbourne's latest shopping, entertainment and fresh food precinct. Construction of an eight-cinema Hoyts and an entertainment concept by Funlab was started in May 2017, and opened in mid-2018.

The fresh food marketplace called Market Lane at The District Docklands, anchored by Woolworths and complemented by a variety of international and local retailers, which formed the final stage of the redevelopment, was completed in mid-2019.

The centre has already undergone an extensive aesthetic upgrade, including the installation of all-weather roofing.

== Tenants ==
The District Docklands has 40,818 square metres (439,360 square feet) of floor space, comprising over 100 stores over two levels serviced by 2,818 car spaces. Major retailers in the centre include Woolworths, Hoyts, H&M, Uniqlo and Dan Murphy's.

== Transport ==
The District Docklands is the terminal stop for tram routes 35, 70 and 86, running along Docklands Drive to the south of the centre. Bus routes 220, 941 and 942 also serve the shopping centre, running along Footscray Road to the east.

The District Docklands also has a multi level car park with 2,818 spaces.
