= Melbourne tram route 55 =

Former tram route in metropolitan Melbourne, Victoria, Australia

Route 55
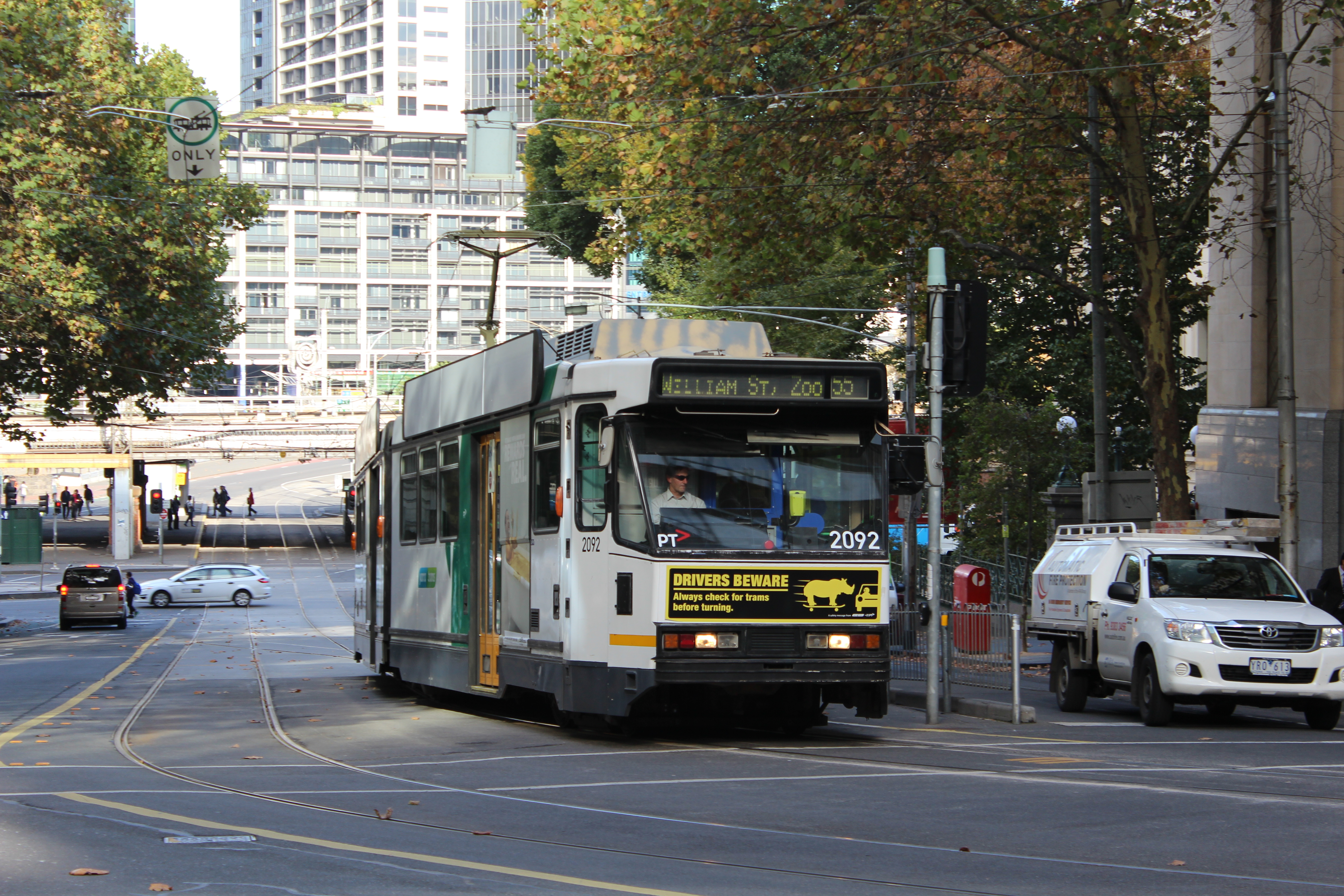
- B class tram on Market Street, May 2013

Overview
- System: Melbourne
- Operator: Yarra Trams
- Depot: Essendon
- Vehicle: Z class B class
- Began service: 30 April 1995
- Ended service: 30 April 2017
- Predecessors: Route 56 (1946-1995)

Route
- Start: Coburg West
- Via: Brunswick West; Parkville; North Melbourne; West Melbourne; William Street; Southbank
- End: Domain Interchange
- Length: 12.5 kilometres
- Timetable: Route 55 timetable
- Map: Route 55 map

Route 55 was a tram route on the Melbourne tram network. The 12.5 kilometre route operated between Coburg West and Domain Interchange, was operated out of Essendon depot with Z and B-class trams. It ceased on 30 April 2017 and was replaced by route 58.

== History ==
Proposals for a tram or railway route to West Coburg date to the late 19th century. Construction of the tramway began in 1923, initially only to Brunswick West, then extended to Bell Street in 1927. The tramway was extended south to St Kilda Road during World War II to alleviate congestion during the war. Proposed extensions north of Bell Street have not been constructed.

Until November 1986, route 55 operated from West Coburg to St Kilda Beach via William Street, St Kilda Road and Fitzroy Street. Route 56 offered a truncated service that ran from West Coburg to Domain Road. Following the opening of a terminating platform at Domain Interchange on 14 November 1986, through-routing to St Kilda Beach was discontinued.

Between 1971 and July 2005 route 55 (and 56 before 1986) only operated on Mondays to Saturdays. On Sundays, the section from West Coburg to the city was covered by Route 68. Route 55 began to run seven days a week from 1 August 2005, with its first Sunday services on 7 August 2005.

During the 2006 Commonwealth Games the route was merged with route 5 to Malvern to alleviate congestion along St Kilda Road.

On 30 April 2017, as part of works associated with the closure of Domain Interchange and construction of Anzac railway station, route 55 ceased. It was replaced by route 58 that traversed the same route as route 55, and then continued south from Domain Interchange to Toorak, partly replacing route 8.

Melbourne tram route 55 evolution
Dates	Route	Notes
1946 - 14 November 1986	St Kilda Beach to West Coburg	via William Street
15 November 1986 - 31 July 2005	Domain Interchange to West Coburg	Monday - Saturday (and Public Holidays with a Saturday timetable)
1 August 2005 - 11 March 2006	Domain Interchange to West Coburg	Full-time service
12 March 2006 - 26 March 2006	Malvern to West Coburg	Temporarily extended from Domain Interchange to Malvern during Commonwealth Games, replacing part of route 5
27 March 2006 - 30 April 2017	Domain Interchange to West Coburg	Merged with route 8 as route 58

== Route description ==
The route ran along Melville Road from the Bell Street intersection, then Dawson Street, Grantham Street, through to Royal Park along a scenic track passing the Royal Park Golf Course and the Melbourne Zoo, coming out at Flemington Road where it intersected Abbotsford Street, then it travelled along Peel Street, William Street, Flinders Lane, Market Street, Queens Bridge, Queensbridge Street, Kings Way and finally Park Street before terminating at the Domain Interchange.

== Route 68 ==
Route 68 was a Sunday-only version of the route 55 service from West Coburg, diverting at Haymarket roundabout to operate along Elizabeth Street to Flinders Street station, instead of along William Street from Domain Interchange. First operated on 6 July 1971, the route was withdrawn on 31 July 2005 when route 55 was altered to operate seven days a week.

== Operation ==
Routes 55 was operated out of Essendon depot with Z and B class trams.
