= Brunswick tram depot =

Tram depot in metropolitan Melbourne, Victoria, Australia

Coordinates: 37.7572°S 144.9629°E

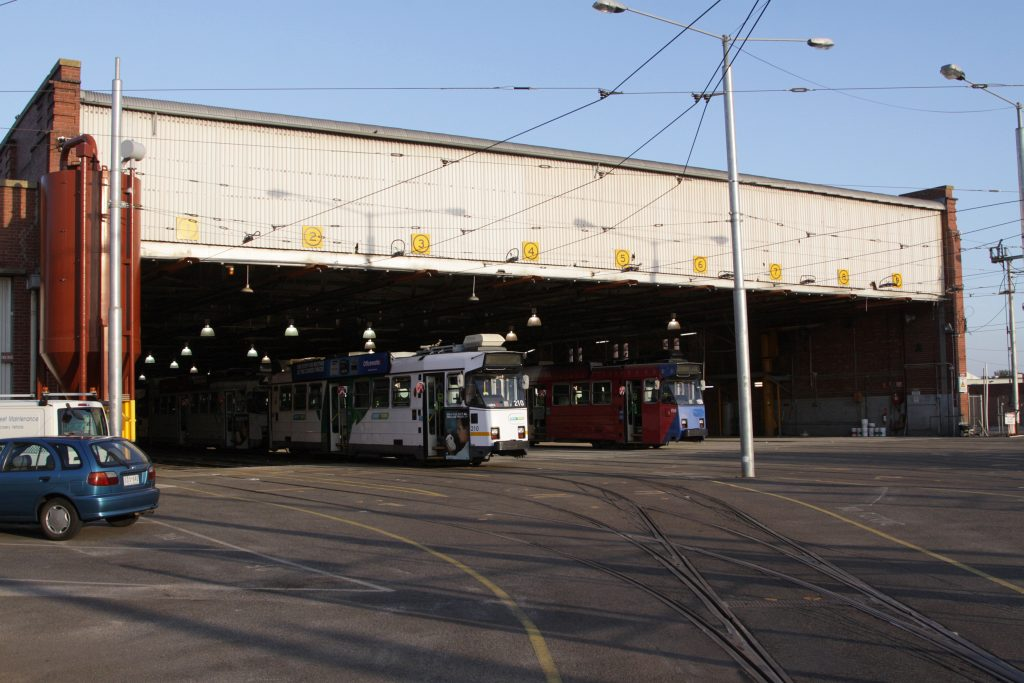
- Tram shed at Brunswick depot, February 2012
- Interactive map of Brunswick tram depot

Location
- Location: Sydney Road, Brunswick

Characteristics
- Owner: VicTrack
- Operator: Yarra Trams
- Depot code: B
- Roads: 11 (9 in sheds, 2 outside)
- Rolling stock: 22 B2 Class; 21 D2 Class; 10 Z3 Class
- Routes served: 1, 6 (shared with Malvern), 19

History
- Opened: 26 April 1936

Brunswick tram depot is located on Sydney Road, Brunswick, a suburb of Melbourne, Victoria, Australia. It opened on 26 April 1936 in conjunction with the electrification of the Brunswick and North Melbourne Cable tram line. Operated by Yarra Trams, it is one of eight tram depots on the Melbourne tram network.

== History ==
The Melbourne & Metropolitan Tramways Board awarded a £30,000 tender in May 1935 for the construction of an electric tram depot at the corner of Sydney Road and Peveril Street. The depot was required to accommodate the electric conversion of the Brunswick and North Melbourne Cable tram line.

The nine road depot, with associated workshop, storerooms, and staff mess-hall was completed and opened on 26 April 1936. Although the original plans had trams entering via Sydney Road, this plan was dropped in favour of the current arrangement with trams entering from the rear, via Cameron Street.

Plans were drawn up in 1989 to permit Brunswick depot to operate the Upfield railway line, which was slated to be converted to light rail. The plans proposed connections from the Upfield railway line to the Brunswick depot fan, a new station at Brunswick depot, and the addition of three outside storage roads. With the planned light rail conversion scrapped in 1994, the plans were never implemented.

When the Public Transport Corporation was privatised in August 1999, Brunswick depot passed to M>Tram. It passed to Yarra Trams when it took control of the entire tram network in April 2004.

In 2009 Brunswick was named as Yarra Tram's fourth Greendepot, after an upgrade to make more water and energy efficient, with improved lighting systems, rainwater harvesting, and a variety of other water and energy saving measures. These initiatives were expected to lower Brunswick's water consumption by 2.5 million litres of water per year, and reduce the depot's carbon output.

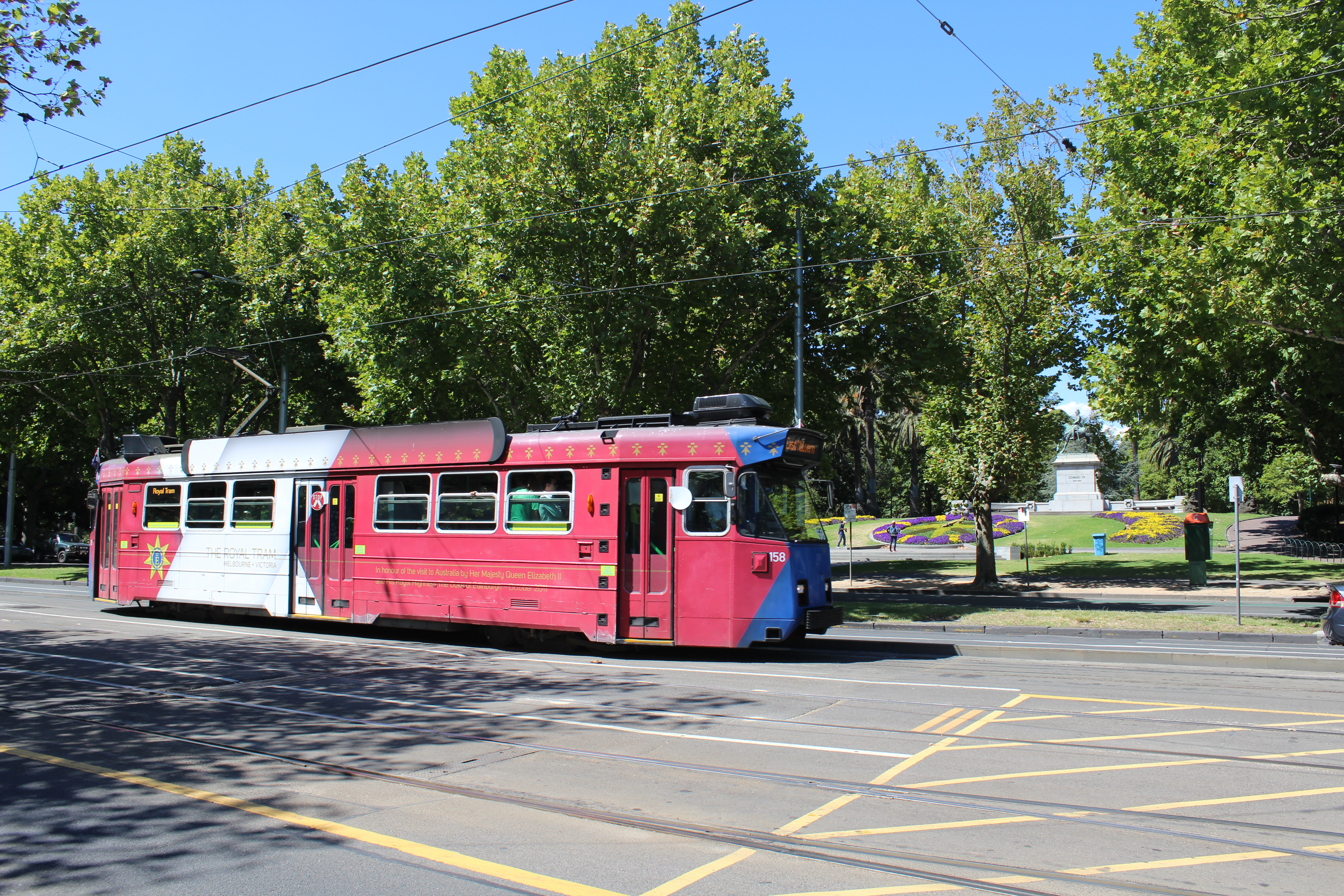
Z3 158 as the Royal Tram used to convey Queen Elizabeth II and Prince Philip during their visit in October 2011

While visiting Melbourne in October 2011, Queen Elizabeth II and Prince Philip travelled aboard Z3 158, decorated as a Royal Tram. It was driven by a Brunswick driver, from Federation Square to Government House, along St Kilda Road.

In 2026, Brunswick tram depot underwent a major upgrade. The upgrade included a new substation, a new exit directly into Sydney Road, more stabling roads and a new accessible platform stop on Moreland Road, serving route 6.

== Layout ==
Brunswick depot has 11 roads in total. Nine are under cover within the shed, while two are outside.

== Rolling stock ==
As of September 2026, the depot has an allocation of 53 trams: 22 B2 Class, 21 D2 Class and 10 Z3 Class.

== Routes ==
The following routes are operated from Brunswick depot:

- : East Coburg to South Melbourne Beach
- : Moreland to Glen Iris shared with Malvern depot
- : North Coburg to Flinders Street Station
