= Melbourne University tram stop =

Tram station in Carlton, Australia

Melbourne University
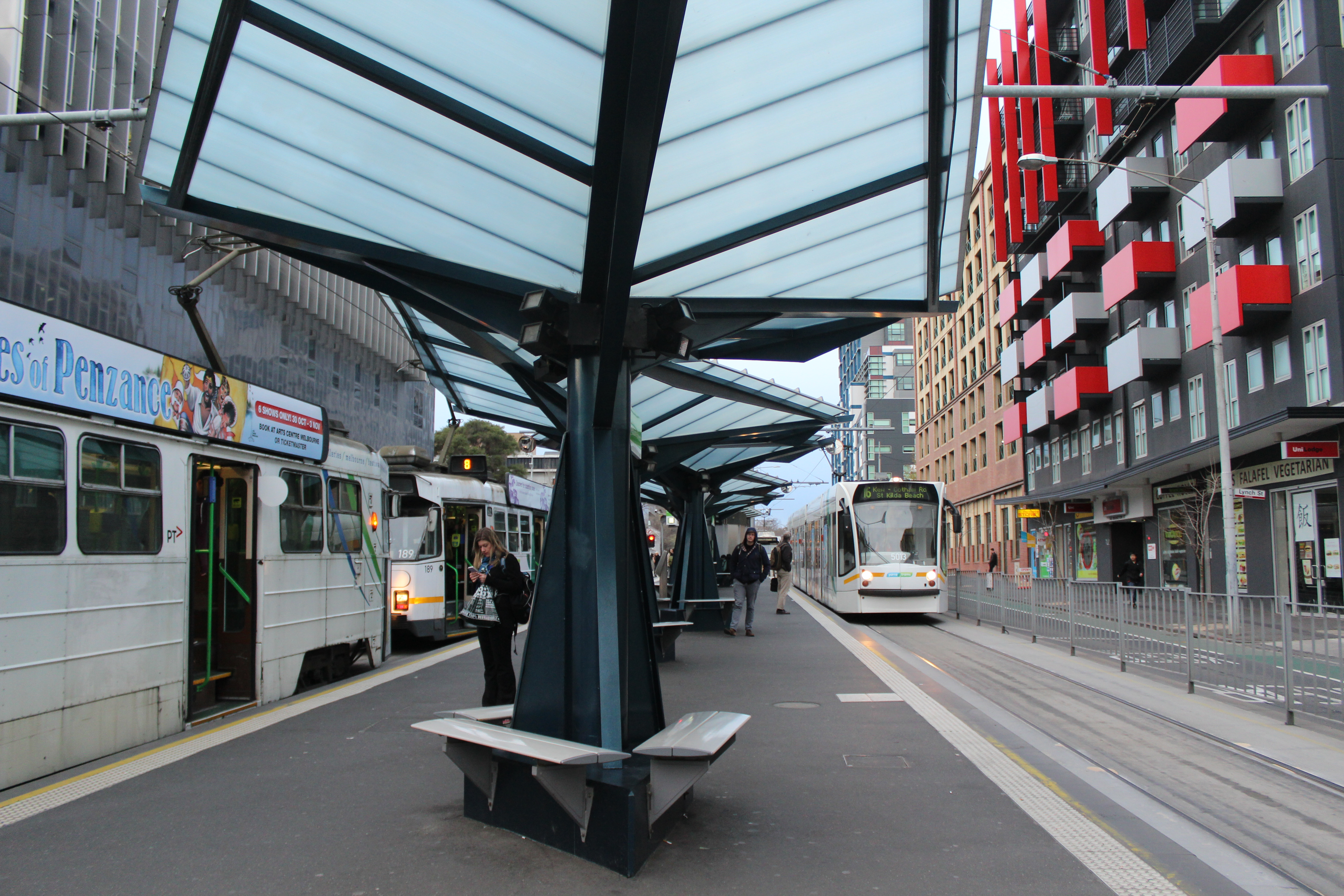
- Northbound view of the tram stop in September 2013

General information
- Location: Swanston Street, Carlton, Victoria; Australia
- Coordinates: 37°47′56″S 144°57′51″E
- System: PTV tram stop
- Owner: VicTrack
- Operator: Yarra Trams
- Platforms: 2 (1 island)
- Tracks: 2 (plus 3 shunts)
- Tram routes: Melbourne tram route 1 Melbourne tram route 3 Melbourne tram route 5 Melbourne tram route 6 Melbourne tram route 16 Melbourne tram route 64 Melbourne tram route 67 Melbourne tram route 72

Construction
- Structure type: At grade
- Accessible: Yes

Other information
- Station code: 1
- Fare zone: Myki Zone 1

History
- Opened: 17 January 1996
- Rebuilt: 15 February 2005
- Electrified: 600 V DC overhead

Services
Preceding station	Yarra Trams	Following station
Lygon Street towards East Coburg	Route 1	Lincoln Square towards South Melbourne Beach
Terminus	Route 3	Lincoln Square towards East Malvern
Terminus	Route 5	Lincoln Square towards Malvern
Lygon Street towards Moreland	Route 6	Lincoln Square towards Glen Iris
Terminus	Route 16	Lincoln Square towards Kew
Terminus	Route 64	Lincoln Square towards East Brighton
Terminus	Route 67	Lincoln Square towards Carnegie
Terminus	Route 72	Lincoln Square towards Camberwell
Track layout
Location

Melbourne University tram stop is a major terminating point and stop of the Melbourne tram system. It features a single island platform and three shunts. It is located on Swanston Street, Carlton, and is the major tram stop for the University of Melbourne, its namesake. It opened in 2005, and is one of the busiest stops on the network; six tram lines terminate at it, while two run through.

== History ==
On 17 January 1996, a headshunt opened to the north of the Melbourne University tram stop on Swanston Street, Carlton, adjacent to the University of Melbourne to allow services from the south to terminate. It had one 100-metre (330 ft) central terminating line accessed by three crossovers.

Problems with the length of D class trams resulted in the headshunt being rebuilt as three separate 60-metre (200 ft) sidings in 2005. The project, begun by M>Tram, was inherited by Yarra Trams when it commenced operation of the entire tram system in April 2004, and was endorsed by the University of Melbourne and Melbourne City Council. It did however attract some controversy, with the Public Transport Users Association and Paul Mees claiming that the location was unsuitable, as if would force those wishing to cross Swanston Street to walk a further 150 metres (500 ft). Construction of the stop commenced on 11 January 2005, with the stop opening to passengers on 15 February 2005, for the first 12 days of construction tram services terminated either side of the works, with a shuttle bus diverting around the works site connecting the tram routes.

== Design ==
Melbourne University tram stop consists of one island platform that provides accessible entry to low-floor trams, it is long enough to serve two D2-class trams at the same time, and has three shunts. It was designed by FMSA Architects for Yarra Trams and Department of Infrastructure. The design consists of six steel 'trees', clad with polycarbonate roofing protecting the seating areas; staff amenities; and ramps permitting full disabled access to the stop.

The island platform is about 59 metres (194 ft) long and 6.5 metres (21 ft) wide; shunt number 1 is 34 metres (112 ft) long, and shunts 2 and 3 are 30 metres (98 ft) long.

== Services ==
Melbourne University tram stop is one of the busiest on the system, and is utilised by eight routes, six terminating and two through running.

Route number	Destination northbound	Destination southbound
Melbourne tram route 1	East Coburg	South Melbourne Beach
Melbourne tram route 3	terminates	Malvern East
Melbourne tram route 5	terminates	Malvern
Melbourne tram route 6	Moreland	Glen Iris
Melbourne tram route 16	terminates	Kew
Melbourne tram route 64	terminates	Brighton East
Melbourne tram route 67	terminates	Carnegie
Melbourne tram route 72	terminates	Camberwell

== Transport Links ==
=== Trains ===
The nearest train station from Melbourne University is Parkville Station which is located 100 metres from the tram stop in Grattan Street where passengers can access Cranbourne, Pakenham, and Sunbury Line services from Parkville Station

=== Buses ===
Kinetic Melbourne operates two bus routes via Melbourne University, under contract to Public Transport Victoria:

- 505 : Moonee Ponds – Melbourne University (Note: Route 505 services continue to/from Heidelberg Station as route 546.)
- 546 : Heidelberg Station – Melbourne University (Note: Route 546 services continue to/from Moonee Ponds Junction as route 505.)

Transit Systems Victoria operates two routes via Melbourne University, under contract to Public Transport Victoria:

- 241 : North Melbourne Station – Yarra Bend Park
- 402 : Footscray Station – East Melbourne
