= Malvern tram depot =

Tram depot in Melbourne, Australia

Coordinates: 37.8587°S 145.0281°E

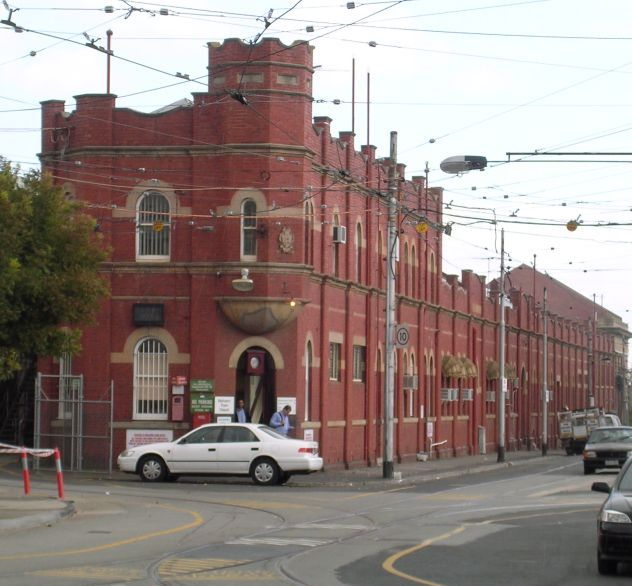
- Malvern tram depot building, April 2004
- Interactive map of Malvern tram depot

Location
- Location: Coldblo Road, Armadale, Victoria

Characteristics
- Owner: VicTrack
- Operator: Yarra Trams
- Depot code: M
- Roads: 17 (14 in sheds, 3 outside)
- Rolling stock: 38 D1 Class; 41 Z3 Class
- Routes served: 5, 6 (shared with Brunswick), 16, 72

History
- Opened: 30 May 1910

Malvern tram depot is located on Coldblo Road, Armadale, Victoria, a suburb in Melbourne, Victoria, Australia. Operated by Yarra Trams, it is one of eight tram depots on the Melbourne tram network.

== History ==
Malvern tram depot was opened on 30 May 1910 by the Prahran & Malvern Tramways Trust (PMTT), to serve their first lines along Glenferrie Road and High Street. It then consisted only of the central building, and the sheds adjacent to the south, along a short side street, Coldblo Road, designed by Leonard J Flannagan, the architect for the PMTT. The main building is in red brick Edwardian style which features a corner turret and curved parapets.

Operations of the Trust greatly expanded in the next decade into most eastern suburbs, with further depots built elswhere. In 1912, a small triangular amenities building was added, and in 1913 the sheds were doubled in length. On 1 March 1920, the PMTT was absorbed into the city-wide Melbourne & Metropolitan Tramways Board. In 1929, a second tramshed was built on the opposite side of Coldblo Road, effectively incorporating the road into the depot, and a new substation was also added to the west end of the earlier building. They were both designed by tramways architect Alan G Monsbourgh in a restrained classical style.

When the Public Transport Corporation was privatised in August 1999, Malvern depot passed to M>Tram. It passed to Yarra Trams when it took control of the entire tram network in April 2004. In January 2005, Coldblo Road that ran between the two sheds with one track was closed to vehicle traffic and two additional tracks laid.

== Heritage listing ==
The whole depot is listed on the Victorian Heritage Register, including the 1930 rotary converter equipment in the substation.

== Layout ==
Access is via turnoffs from Glenferrie Road from both tracks in both directions to a single access track along Coldblo Road. The tracks then split to 5 roads in the old (south) shed, 3 roads between the two sheds, and 9 roads in the north shed, for a total of 17 roads.

== Rolling stock ==
As of June 2026, the depot has an allocation of 79 trams: 38 D1 Class and 41 Z3 Class.

== Routes ==
The following routes are operated from Malvern depot:

- : Melbourne University to Malvern
- : Moreland to Glen Iris shared with Brunswick depot
- : Melbourne University to Kew
- : Melbourne University to Camberwell
