= D class Melbourne tram =

Low-floor trams of the Melbourne network

D class
- D2 5004 at the East Coburg terminus working a diverted route 6 service, September 2026

- Refurbished interior with seating
- Manufacturer: Siemens
- Built at: Uerdingen, Krefeld, Germany
- Family name: Combino
- Replaced: Most remaining SW5, W6, SW6 and W7 trams (excluding City Circle trams), many Z1 and Z2 trams.
- Constructed: 2002–2004
- Number built: 59
- Number in service: 59
- Fleet numbers: D1 3501–D1 3538; D2 5001–D2 5021
- Capacity: D1: 32/90; D2: 56/130; (seated/standing)
- Depots: Brunswick; Malvern

Specifications
- Train length: D1: 20.04 m (65 ft 9 in); D2: 29.85 m (97 ft 11 in)
- Width: 2.65 m (8 ft 8 in)
- Height: D1: 3.65 m (12 ft 0 in); D2: 3.53 m (11 ft 7 in)
- Doors: 2 single, 4 (D1) or 6 (D2) double
- Articulated sections: D1: 3 (2 articulations); D2: 5 (4 articulations)
- Wheel diameter: 600–520 mm (24–20 in) (new–worn)
- Wheelbase: 1.8 m (5 ft 11 in)
- Maximum speed: 70 km/h (43 mph)
- Weight: D1: 25.8 t (25.4 long tons; 28.4 short tons); D2: 35.3 t (34.7 long tons; 38.9 short tons)
- Traction system: Siemens 2-level IGBT–VVVF
- Traction motors: 4 × Siemens 1TB1422-0GA03 100 kW (130 hp)
- Power output: 400 kW (536 hp)
- Acceleration: 1.3 m/s^{2} (2.9 mph/s)
- Deceleration: 1.61 m/s^{2} (3.6 mph/s) (Max D1 operational); 1.47 m/s^{2} (3.3 mph/s) (Max D2 operational); 1.35 m/s^{2} (3.0 mph/s) (Average D1 operational); 1.25 m/s^{2} (2.8 mph/s) (Average D2 operational); 3.4 m/s^{2} (7.6 mph/s) (Max D1 emergency); 3.3 m/s^{2} (7.4 mph/s) (Max D2 emergency); 2.74 m/s^{2} (6.1 mph/s) (Average D2 emergency)
- Electric systems: 600 V DC (nominal) from overhead catenary
- Current collection: Pantograph
- UIC classification: D1: Bo′+0′+Bo′; D2: Bo′+0′+2′+0′+Bo′
- Bogies: SF 30 C TFW (powered), SF 30 C LFW (D2 trailer)
- Track gauge: 1,435 mm (4 ft 8 1/2 in) standard gauge

The D class Melbourne tram is a fleet of low-floor Combino trams that operate on the Melbourne tram network. They were built by Siemens in Uerdingen, Krefeld, Germany, and are divided into two classes: the three section D1-class which was introduced between 2002 and 2004, and the five section D2-class which was introduced in 2004. The D class was procured by M>Tram and have been operated by Yarra Trams since they took control of the entire tram network in April 2004.

== History ==
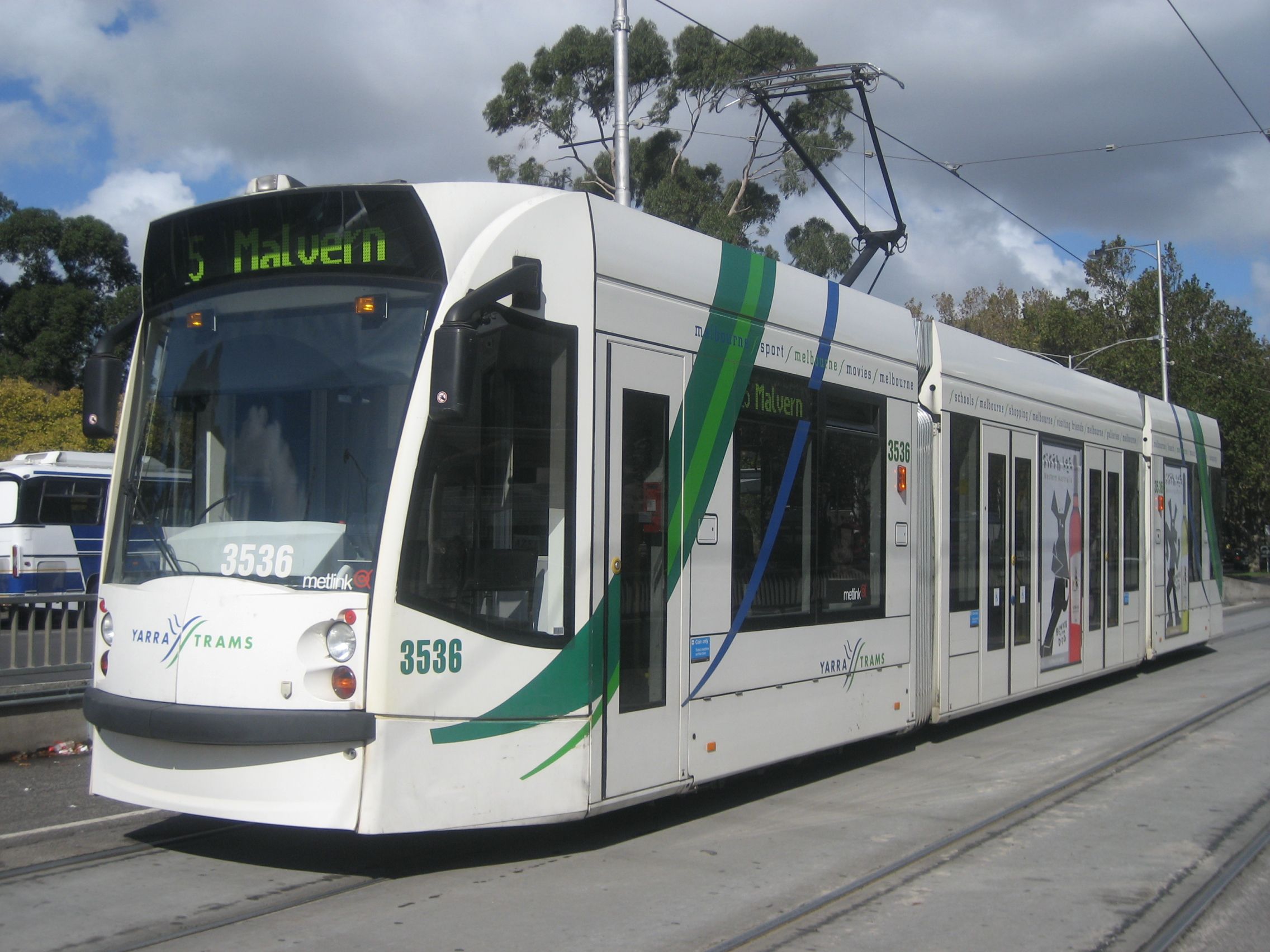
D1 3536 in the original Yarra Trams livery in November 2007

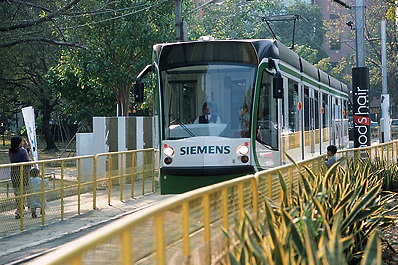
A Melbourne D2-class tram on demonstration in Kaohsiung, Taiwan in January 2004

To meet a franchise commitment to introduce new trams to replace Z-class trams, 59 German built Siemens Combino low-floor trams were introduced by M>Tram.

The first tram arrived for testing in August 2002, and the first four entered service in November 2002. M>Tram operations were transferred to Yarra Trams in April 2004 following negotiations with the State Government after National Express handed the M>Tram franchise back to the government in December 2002.

To aid disabled access to trams from platform stops, 'gap eliminators' were fitted to all 59 D1 and D2-class trams in 2013. Costing $400,000 to fit to the fleet, they are a strip attached to the door step of the trams that prevent the wheels of wheelchairs from getting stuck between the door step and platform. 'Gap eliminators' proved successful in an earlier 2012 trial on two route 96 Ds, before being fitted to all D1 and D2-class trams. In August 2004, D1 3507 was badly damaged in a collision and returned to Germany in November 2004 for repairs. It did not return to service until March 2009.

In early 2013, all 59 D1 and D2-class trams had their passenger information systems upgraded to announce upcoming stops. The upgrade, which cost $343,000, allows announcements on all routes on which D class trams regularly travel and their alternative deviations, informing passengers of upcoming stops and connections.

In December 2021, D2 class 5008 was withdrawn from service and is now stored at Preston Workshops and is used for spare parts on other D class trams. D2 5008 was later returned to service in February 2026.

D class trams are now operated by Malvern and Brunswick depot, all together there are 58 in service D class trams in Melbourne which operate on route 5, 6, 16, 19 and 72.

=== Fatigue cracking ===
The bodies of both D1 and D2-class vehicles were found to be developing microscopic cracks in November 2006, which could lead to structural collapse in the event of an accident. This resulted in all 59 Combino trams undergoing structural work to strengthen their frames. The repairs necessitated the removal of between four and eight seats per tram, leaving D1-class trams with 32 seats and D2-class trams with 56.

=== Refurbishment ===
Commencing in late 2023, all 59 D class trams received a minor refurbishment, which involved new stop buttons, a new floor and a repainted interior. The refurbishment program was completed in mid 2026.

== Variants ==
D class trams comes in two variants: the 38 strong D1-class, which have three-sections; and 21 strong D2-class, which have five-sections. The D1-class entered service in late 2002, being operated from Malvern depot, with the last entering service in 2004, while the D2-class entered service in 2004. From 26 July 2004 D2-class trams were progressively moved to operation on route 96, displacing B-class trams that were in service at the time. In September 2013, following the introduction of the E-class trams, Yarra Trams started to move D2 class trams to Brunswick depot to operate on route 19.

As of March 2017, all D1-class operate from Malvern depot, while all D2-class operate out of Brunswick depot.

== Operation ==
D1-class trams operate on the following routes:

- 5: Malvern to Melbourne University
- 6: Glen Iris to Moreland
- 16: Kew to Melbourne University
- 72: Camberwell to Melbourne University

D2-class trams operate on the following routes:

- 6: Glen Iris to Moreland
- 19: North Coburg to Flinders Street Station

== In Kaohsiung ==
In January 2004, a Melbourne D2-class tram operated on a demonstration track in Central Park, Kaohsiung, Taiwan before being delivered to Melbourne. The Kaohsiung City Government built the temporary line to demonstrate the concept of light rail.

== Criticisms ==
In March 2016, Time Out Magazine rated the D Class tram the worst on the Yarra Trams network. The reasons given were a low number of seats, the uncomfortableness of the seats, a loud screech when the doors open and close and poor ride quality.
