= Melbourne tram route 96 =

Tram route in metropolitan Melbourne, Victoria, Australia

Route 96

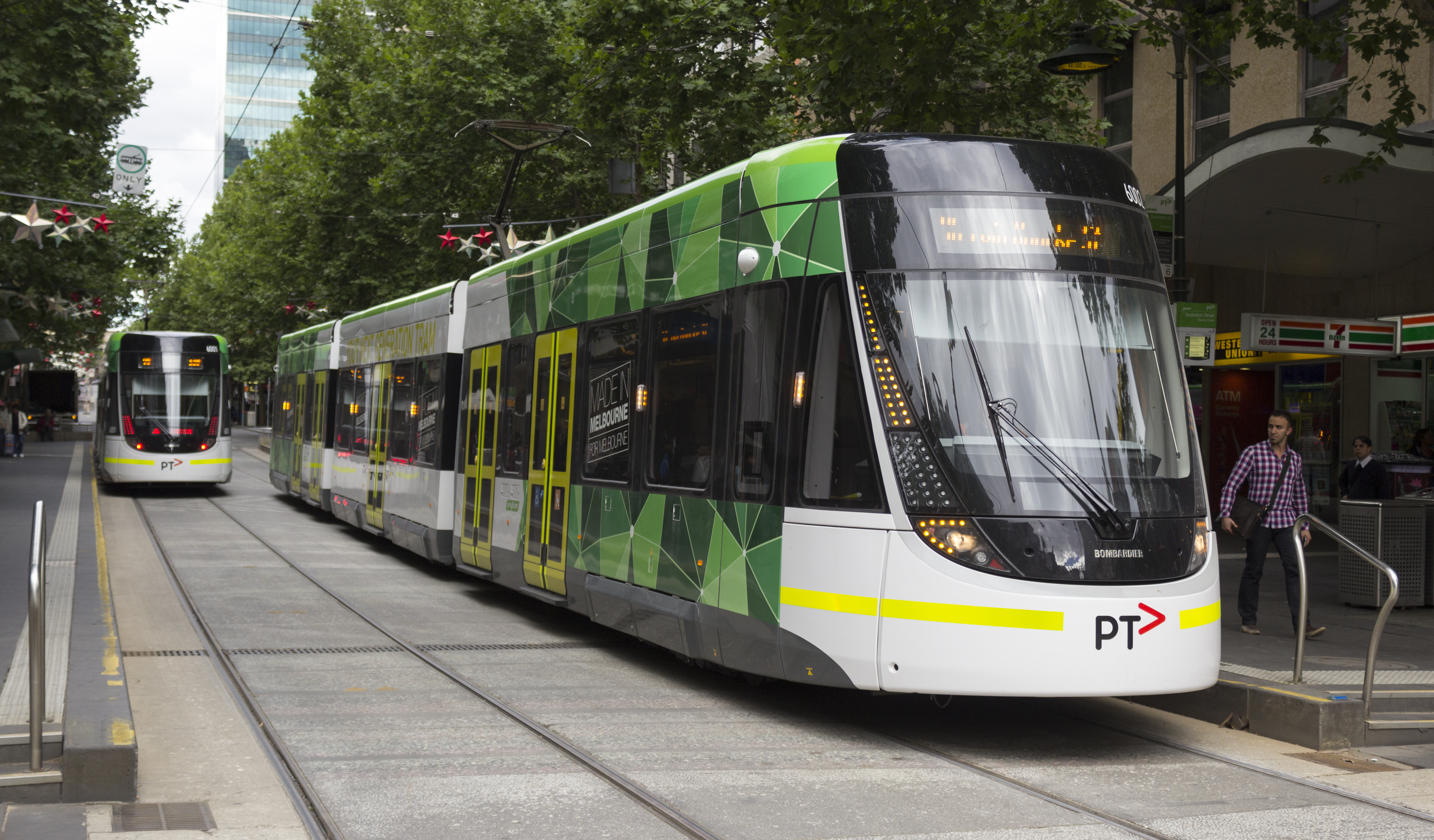
- E class trams on Bourke Street, December 2013

Overview
- System: Melbourne
- Operator: Yarra Trams
- Depot: Southbank; Preston
- Vehicle: C2 class E class
- Night-time: Friday & Saturday

Route
- Start: East Brunswick
- Via: Fitzroy North; Carlton North; Carlton; Fitzroy; Bourke Street; Southbank; South Melbourne; Albert Park; Middle Park
- End: St Kilda Beach
- Length: 13.9 kilometres
- Timetable: Route 96 timetable
- Map: Route 96 map

Melbourne tram route 96 is operated by Yarra Trams on the Melbourne tram network from East Brunswick to St Kilda Beach. The 13.9 kilometre route is operated out of Southbank and Preston depots with C2 and E class trams.

== History ==
Part of the route opened as a cable tram line operated by the Melbourne Tramway and Omnibus Company on 30 August 1887, operating along Bourke and Nicholson Streets. It operated until 26 October 1940, when the Bourke Street cable lines were abandoned by the Melbourne & Metropolitan Tramways Board (MMTB) in favour of double decker buses. The Bourke Street cable lines were the last cable trams to operate in Melbourne.

The MMTB, unhappy with the performance of the buses, decided to reinstate trams when the buses reached life expiry, and rebuilt the tram tracks of the cable car routes. Trams on the route to East Preston (predecessor to the modern 86) started on 26 June 1955, while trams to Brunswick East began operating on 8 April 1956 as route 96.

The W7 class trams were built for running on these two lines. The new Z class trams first ran on route 96 in June 1975.

In the 1980s, it was decided to close the short St Kilda and Port Melbourne railway lines and convert them to light rail. The tracks along Bourke Street were taken round into Spencer Street, south along Clarendon Street to then turn into the rail reservation to St Kilda along the former St Kilda railway line. At the former terminus at St Kilda Station, the line ran past the station building, and turned into Fitzroy Street, joining existing lines round The Esplanade to terminate in Acland Street. The first trams ran on 20 November 1987. The broad gauge 1,600 mm (5 ft 3 in) railway track was replaced with standard gauge 1,435 mm (4 ft 8 1/2 in), and the overhead voltage was reduced from 1500 V DC to 600 V DC. Low platforms were built adjacent to the former stations' platforms, with the station buildings put to other uses.

With the closure of North Fitzroy depot on 19 December 1993, its route 96 duties were transferred to South Melbourne depot.

After the merger of the M>Tram network with Yarra Trams in 2004, most D2 class trams were transferred from Malvern depot to Southbank depot to help alleviate the congestion on the route. After the introduction of these low floor Siemens Combino trams on the route, accessible stops were built on Bourke Street, Fitzroy Street and St Kilda Esplanade, increasing customer safety and comfort.

In response to frequent overcrowding on the tram system in 2008, the state government leased new C2 class trams from Mulhouse, France specifically to run the route. The first of these new trams began operation on 11 June 2008 with the nickname Bumble Bee 1. In November 2013, the first E class trams entered service on the route. In January 2016, Route 96 began operating through the night on Fridays and Saturdays as part of the Night Network.

In July 2023, PTV began trialling a new NaviLens information system for those with vision impairments on Route 96.

== Route 96 Project ==
On 17 April 2012, it was announced that Route 96 would become the focus of tram upgrades to transform it from a tramway to a light rail system; a "model" for how Melbourne's tram network should operate. The Route 96 Project superseded a similar project of the previous government, Tram 109.

The proposed aims of the project are:

- Providing level access stops along the entire route
- Upgraded termini at Blyth Street, East Brunswick, and Acland Street, St Kilda
- Segregation treatments to better separate low-floor trams from traffic
- Improved priority for low-floor trams at traffic lights
- Improved customer information

The objectives are to:

- Increase access to trams and safety for customers through providing improved infrastructure and information
- Improve tram reliability and efficiency through increased priority and accessible infrastructure
- Ensure better utilisation of the road network with a focus on moving people
- Design a full route of enhancements to demonstrate the benefits of a modern light rail system in Melbourne conditions, compared with a traditional tram network.

In mid-2013, the proposed changes were released to the public. They involved an eventual segregation of trams from traffic along nearly the entire route, and the upgrade of all stops to level access to improve passenger flow and make the network disability-compliant. On Nicholson Street, all on-street parking would eventually be removed to create dedicated tram lanes where it is illegal for cars to drive. Easy-access stops (level access by raising the road to footpath level) would be constructed between Blyth Street and Brunswick Road, while centre island superstops would be constructed between Brunswick Road and the CBD.

The Batman Park (previously the World Trade Centre) and Clarendon Street Junction stops in South Melbourne would be redesigned with a separate bay for the Colonial Tramcar Restaurant, while in St Kilda, some parts of Acland Street would be closed to cars in favour of widened footpaths, pedestrian plazas and tram right of way.

The project has received strong support from commuters, urban planners and public transport advocates, while there have been concerns from shop owners along the route that a loss of on-street parking will negatively affect business.

Work completed as at October 2018 has included:

- new Blyth Street terminus headshunt at the northern end in July 2015
- new Clarendon Street Junction stop in January 2016
- new Acland Street terminus in December 2016
- stop upgrades at Johnston Street, Moor street and Melbourne Museum in September 2018 along with stop removal at Hoddle St and Hanover street

== Route ==
Interactive map of Melbourne tram route 96.

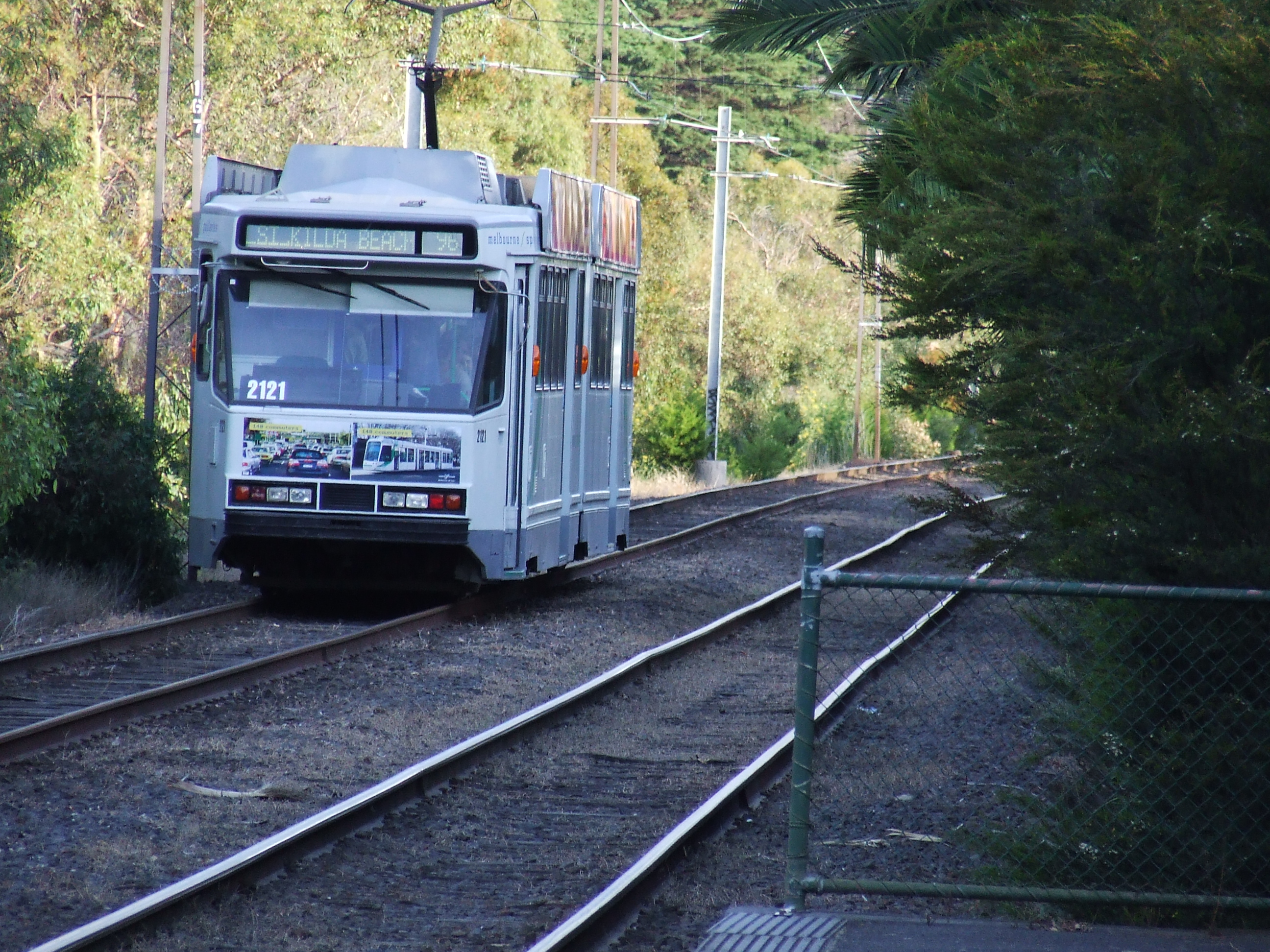
B2 class tram on the former St Kilda railway line section in January 2006

Route 96 runs from the terminus at Blyth Street, East Brunswick, travelling south on Nicholson Street through the suburbs of Carlton North, Fitzroy North, Carlton and Fitzroy, passing the Royal Exhibition Building and Melbourne Museum. It enters the CBD on Spring Street turning right into Bourke Street at Parliament House, travels through the Bourke Street Mall and turns left into Spencer Street, passing Southern Cross station. It crosses the Yarra River and enters Southbank on Clarendon Street before passing through the suburbs of South Melbourne, Albert Park, Middle Park and St Kilda on a right-of-way track. The tram line exits the private right-of-way and travels along Fitzroy Street and The Esplanade to Acland Street, St Kilda where it terminates.

== Operation ==
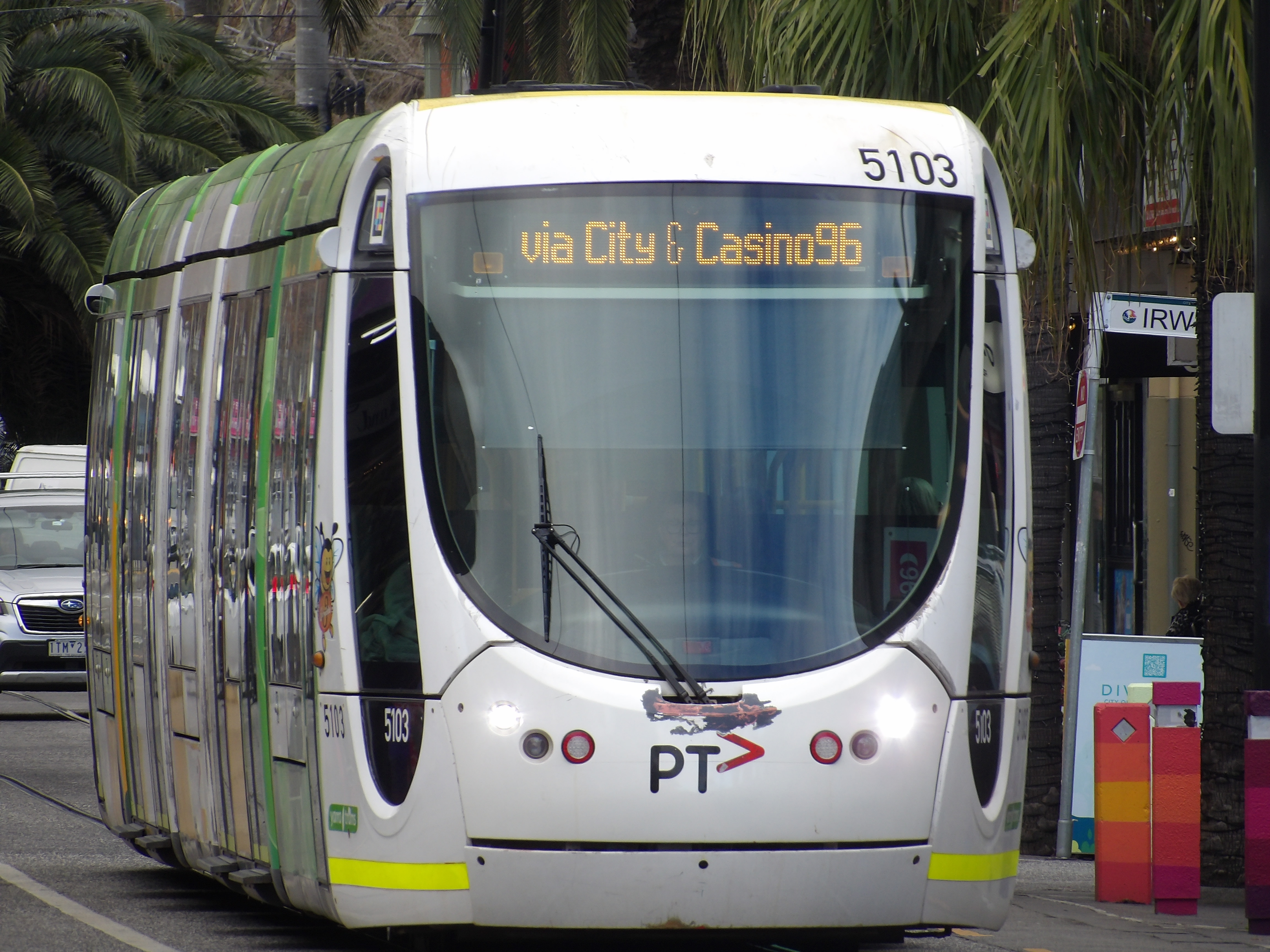
C2 class tram at the Belford St tram stop on Acland Street in July 2025.

Route 96 is operated out of Southbank and Preston depots with C2 and E class trams. Occasionally, A class trams are also used.

== Special events and services ==
Several annual events affect the usual services along route 96:

- Australian Formula 1 Grand Prix - most services terminate at Middle Park and are replaced with buses
- RMIT University exams - (held at Melbourne Sports & Aquatic Centre) additional services
- St Kilda Festival - additional services but terminate at St Kilda station

== In popular culture ==
Route 96 is featured in the Courtney Barnett song Elevator Operator.
