= A. E. Smith =

A. E. Smith may refer to:

- AE Smith, a privately owned commercial air-conditioning and mechanical services contractor in Australia
- A. E. Smith (violin maker) (1880–1978), English-born Australian violin and viola maker
- Alan E. Smith (born 1942), New Zealand rugby union player
- Albert E. Smith (producer) (1875–1958), English stage magician, film director, and producer
- Albert Edward Smith (1871–1947), Canadian religious leader and politician
- Albert Edward Smith (Australian politician) (1881–1965), Australian politician
- Allan Edward Smith (1892–1987), American naval officer
- Amy Erica Smith (born 1976), American political scientist
