= North Fitzroy tram depot =

Coordinates: 37°46′53.5″S 144°58′42″E

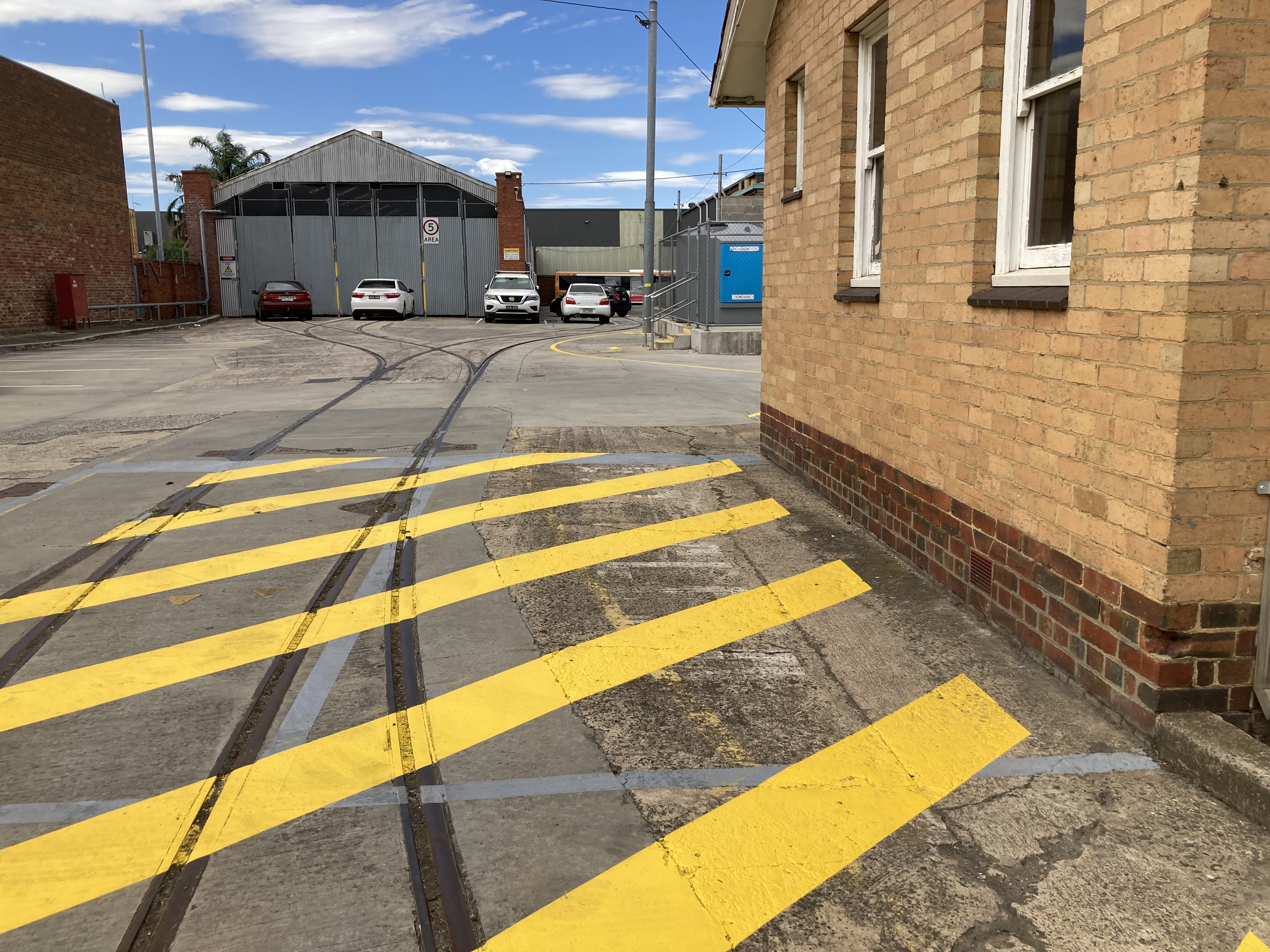
- Interior of the former tram depot in March 2023
- Interactive map of North Fitzroy tram depot

Location
- Location: Nicholson Street, North Fitzroy

Characteristics
- Owner: VicTrack
- Operator: Public Transport Corporation
- Roads: 4 (2 inside, 2 outside)

History
- Opened: 1956
- Closed: 18 December 1993
- Former depot code: N

North Fitzroy tram depot is a former depot on the Melbourne tram network. Located on Nicholson Street, North Fitzroy, it opened in 1956 when the Melbourne & Metropolitan Tramways Board converted part of its North Fitzroy bus depot for tramway operation when the Bourke Street to Brunswick East line reopened. In 1976 it became a sub-unit of East Preston depot. It was considered to be the smallest tram depot in Melbourne.

With the impending takeover of the Public Transport Corporation's bus services from the depot by the National Bus Company, it closed on 18 December 1993 with the remaining 10 trams that operated on route 96 reallocated to South Melbourne.

It briefly reopened in 2008/09 to stable W class trams used on the City Circle while Southbank depot was undergoing refurbishment. In 2020 the tracks leading to the depot were disconnected during works along Nicholson Street.

Immediately to the south is a Public Transport Victoria bus depot, operated since 2022 by Kinetic Melbourne.

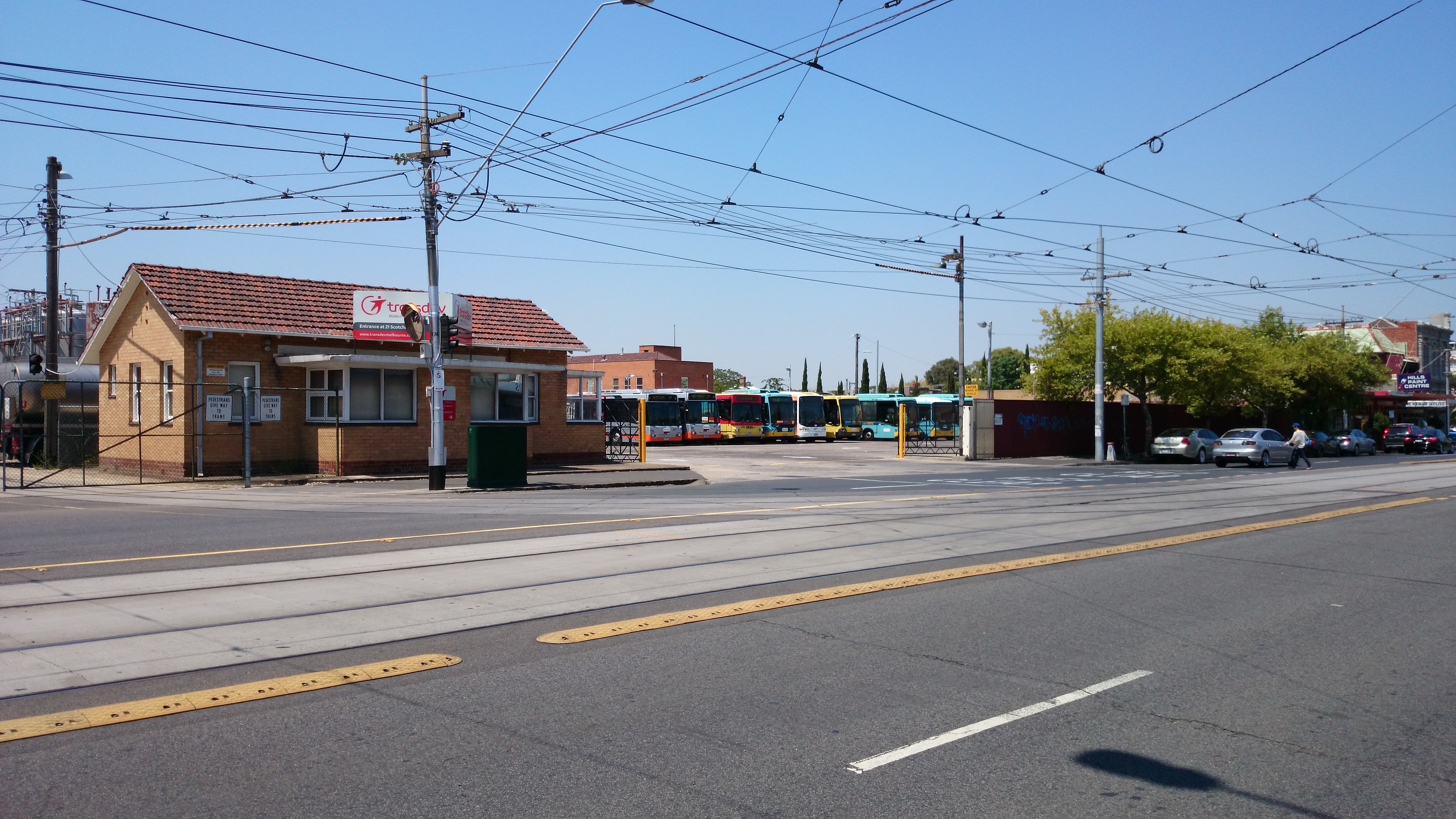
February 2014

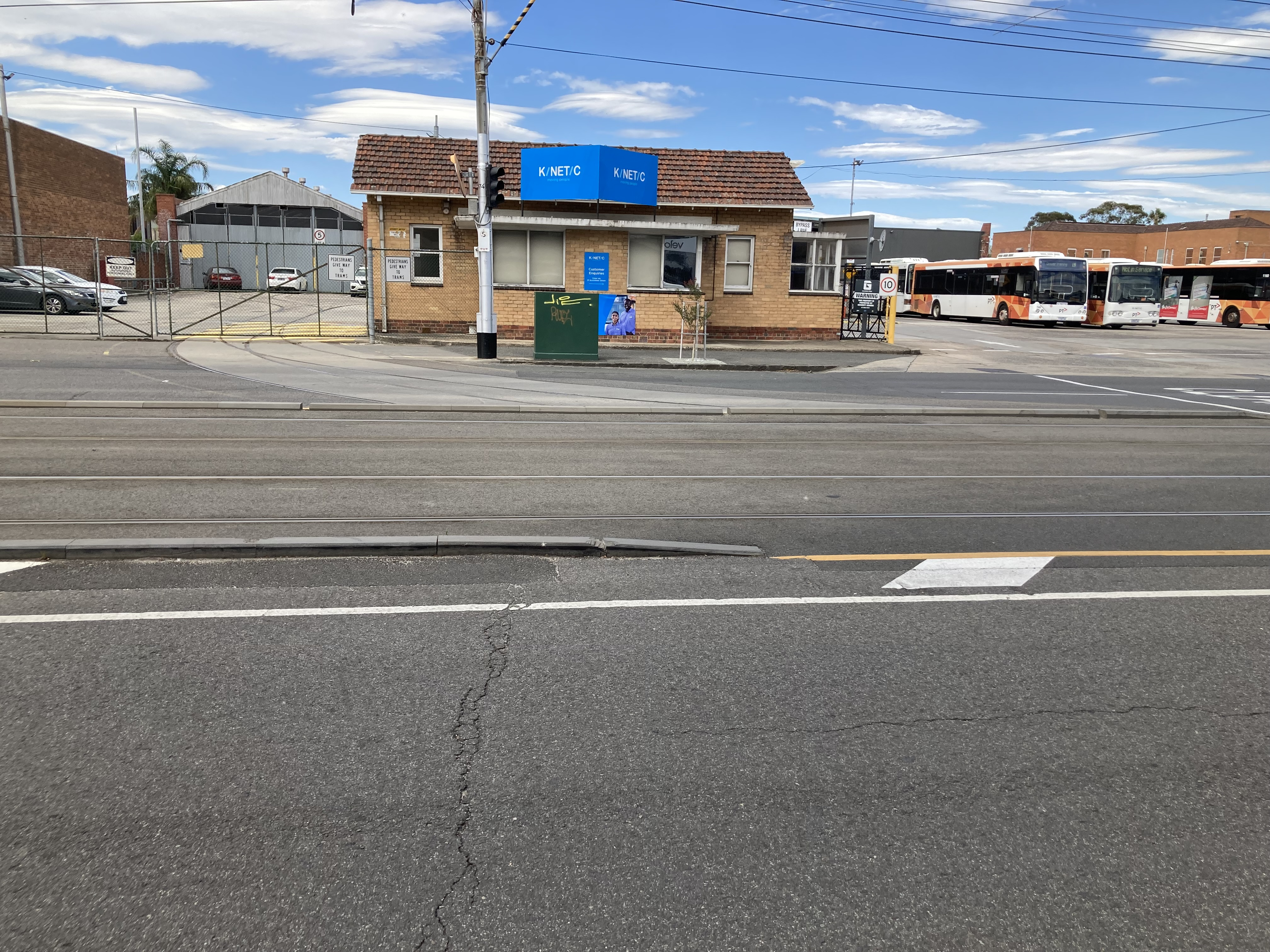
March 2023

Tram tracks leading to the depot before and after disconnection
