= Erica Smith =

Erica Smith may refer to:

- Amy Erica Smith (born 1976), American political scientist
- Erica D. Smith (born 1969), American politician from North Carolina

== See also ==
- Erica Smyth (born 1952), Australian geologist
