= Spotless Group Holdings =

Australian listed company

Spotless
- ISIN: AU000000SPO4
- Industry: Diversified Support Services
- Predecessors: 1961–2012 ASX: SPT; 2012–2014 Private Equity Partners
- Founded: 1946; 80 years ago Fitzroy, Victoria, Australia
- Founder: Ian McMullin
- Fate: Acquired by Downer Group
- Headquarters: Melbourne, Australia
- Area served: Australia; New Zealand
- Services: Food services; Cleaning; Laundry; Security; Facility management
- Revenue: A$3,176 million (2016)
- Operating income: A$208 million (2016)
- Net income: A$122 million (2016)
- Number of employees: 36,000 (2016)
- Parent: Downer Group (87.8%)
- Divisions: Health, Education and Government; Commercial and Leisure; Base and Township; Laundry and Linen
- Website: spotless.com

Spotless Group Holdings is an Australian listed company that provides 'integrated facility services' such as cleaning, security, catering and facility maintenance in Australia and New Zealand. The company, established in 1957, has a workforce of over 36,000.

== Operations ==
Spotless operates a number of in-house brands, providing services in:

- Laundry and linen
- Health, education, and government
- Commercial and leisure
- Base and township

=== Laundries ===
The laundry and linen branch operates in its own division, which provides 10% of revenue and is represented by the brands Ensign and Taylors.

=== Facilities services ===
The remaining six service areas, which report under the Facilities Services division, include:

- Asset management, operating the brands of Spotless, Nationwide Venue Management (NVM)
- Asset maintenance, under the brands, Assets Services, AE Smith, Nuvo
- Catering, under the brands, Epicure, Alliance, Mustard
- Cleaning, under the brands, Clean Domain, Clean Event
- Utilities services, under the brands, Utility Asset Service Group (UASG)
- Security, under the brand TechGuard Security (TGS)

== History ==
In 1946, Ian McMullin founded Spotless as a dry-cleaning business at 129 Smith Street, Fitzroy, Australia In 1957, the business was incorporated as Spotless Pty Ltd. It was listed on the Australian Stock Exchange (ASX) as Spotless Limited in 1961.

In 1970, it expanded into New Zealand through Nationwide Food Services. In 1971, it acquired a local garment hanger supply business. In 1972, Ian McMullin, the founder of the company, retires to director. In 1977, the company expanded into the industrial laundry space with the acquisition of a 50% interest in Ensign, the remaining 50% was acquired in 1981; and into New Zealand market through laundry business acquisitions.

The company acquired Nationwide Food Services and O’Brien in 1984. It had its first company contract with the Australian Department of Defence in 1987. Acquired Plastiform (US-based) to expand internationally. With an increased scale of the New Zealand laundries business with the acquisition of 55% of Taylors (New Zealand Stock Exchange listed laundry services business) in 1991; the remaining 45% was acquired in 2009.

- 1993 Enhanced catering offering with the acquisition of Mustard Catering, a large Western Australia based up-market catering group
- 1999 Strengthened facility maintenance and cleaning capabilities with the acquisition of Support Services businesses from P&O in Australia and New Zealand
- 2001 Acquired Braitrim (UK based), which was merged with Plastiform to further expand garment hanger manufacturing and supply capability.
- 2001 Acquired Epicure Catering providing exposure to high end, boutique catering services and further extending capabilities across catering services
- 2004 Won its first PPP project for social infrastructure to provide facilities services for New South Wales schools
- 2006–2008 Acquisition of Alliance Catering. Ian McMullin (founder), Ron Evans and Brian Blythe stepped down from Board 2006–08.
- 2009 Expanded facility management capability by extending service maintenance product lines into painting with the acquisition of Riley Shelley, a painting and refurbishment business
- 2010 Obtained secondary listing on New Zealand Stock Exchange.
- 2010 Entered into the international facility services market with the acquisition of CE Property Services — Cleanevent and CleanDomain
- 2012 Taken private by Pacific Industrial Services — an entity owned by the PEP Shareholders, the Coinvestment Shareholders and Management Shareholders.

Bruce Dixon was appointed CEO in 2012, he restructured the company around industry segments (rather than service sectors) to promote Spotless as an "integrated services provider", he also promoted open communication and pushing decision making and responsibility.

In 2014, the company was relisted on the ASX under the code SPO. Also in 2014, the company had acquired the national security company ACG, launches it under the new brand Techguard Security (TGS); in 2015, AE Smith, a commercial air-conditioning and mechanical services contractor; Utility Services Group (USG), rebranded as Utility Asset Services Group (UASG); and Prime Laundries to increase laundry processing volumes. In 2015/16, Spotless also took over ACG, a security company, and renamed it Techguard. Spotless acquires Nuvo, an electrical and technology services company, in 2016.

In 2017, Downer Group launched a hostile takeover bid gaining control in June 2017.

== Partnerships ==
On 2 September 2013, the local organising committee of the 2015 Cricket World Cup, which was hosted by New Zealand and Australia, appointed a joint venture of Nine Live and Spotless Group to provide hospitality services for the tournament. The services include sales, marketing, and event management of the tournament’s hospitality program.

== Controversy ==
Spotless has a high-profile industrial relations test case in Australia after claims of bullying and harassment surrounding Spotless’ use of individual flexible agreements (IFAs) were raised by members of United Voice. United Voice is the union that represents contract cleaners employed by Spotless at shopping centres, CBD buildings and other privately and publicly owned buildings.

The case was heard by the Federal Court of Australia, where United Voice argues that Spotless is in breach of the Fair Work Act as it leaves cleaners worse off than they would be without the IFAs. United Voice also states that cleaners have reported that they have been unduly pressured into signing the agreements and were allegedly told that if they refused to sign the IFAs, they would be warned that their hours would be cut or that they would be refused overtime hours after the Cleaning Services Award. The Union says Spotless' use of IFAs in these circumstances is contrary to the intent of the individual flexibility provisions under the Fair Work Act and that Spotless is trying to re-introduce WorkChoices AWAs.

The case was due to go before Fair Work Australia on 18 April 2011; however, Spotless did not attend the voluntary mediation.

=== Resolution ===
In April 2012, Spotless agreed to audit a representative group of cleaners’ employment records. The Fair Work Ombudsman agreed to Spotless’ decision to sign a Pro-Active Compliance Deed.

== See also ==
- 2007 Spotless dispute
- List of cleaning companies
