= C2 class Melbourne tram =

Class of trams built by Alstom, in service in Melbourne

C2 class
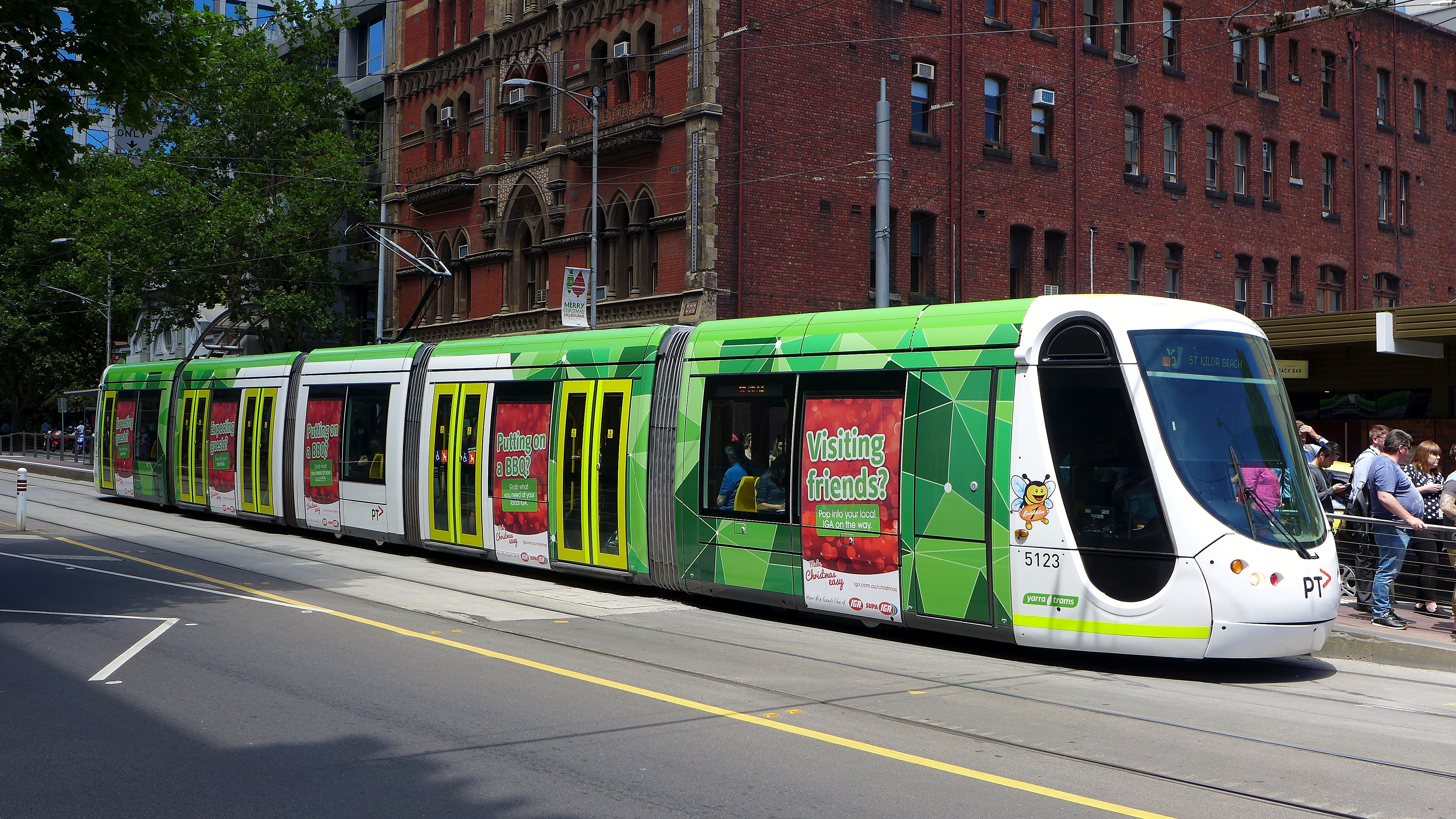
- C2 5123 on Bourke Street, December 2014
- Manufacturer: Alstom
- Built at: La Rochelle, France
- Family name: Citadis 302
- Number built: 5
- Number in service: 5
- Fleet numbers: C2 5103, C2 5106, C2 5111, C2 5113, C2 5123
- Capacity: 54/150 (seated/standing)
- Depot: Southbank
- Line served: Route 96

Specifications
- Train length: 32,517 mm (106 ft 8.2 in)
- Width: 2.65 m (8 ft 8 in)
- Height: 3.27 m (10 ft 9 in)
- Articulated sections: 5 (four articulations)
- Wheel diameter: 610–530 mm (24–21 in) (new–worn)
- Wheelbase: 1.6 m (5 ft 3 in)
- Weight: 40.0 t (39.4 long tons; 44.1 short tons)
- Traction motors: 4 × Alstom 4-HGA-1433 120 kW (160 hp)
- Power output: 480 kW (640 hp)
- Acceleration: 1.03 m/s^{2} (2.3 mph/s)
- Deceleration: 1.39 m/s^{2} (3.1 mph/s) (Dynamic braking); 1.2 m/s^{2} (2.7 mph/s) (Mechanical braking); 2.67 m/s^{2} (6.0 mph/s) (Emergency)
- Electric systems: 600 V DC (nominal) from overhead catenary
- Current collection: Pantograph
- UIC classification: Bo′+0+2′+0+Bo′
- Bogies: Alstom Arpège Note: each section has only one (or no) bogie, which each have suspension with dampers, but do not pivot.
- Track gauge: 1,435 mm (4 ft 8 1/2 in) standard gauge

The C2 class trams are five-section Alstom Citadis 302 trams built in La Rochelle, France that operate on the Melbourne tram network. They were built for the tram network in Mulhouse, France, but being surplus to Mulhouse demands, were leased to use in Melbourne in 2008, later being purchased by the Government of Victoria. The trams operate solely on route 96.

== History ==
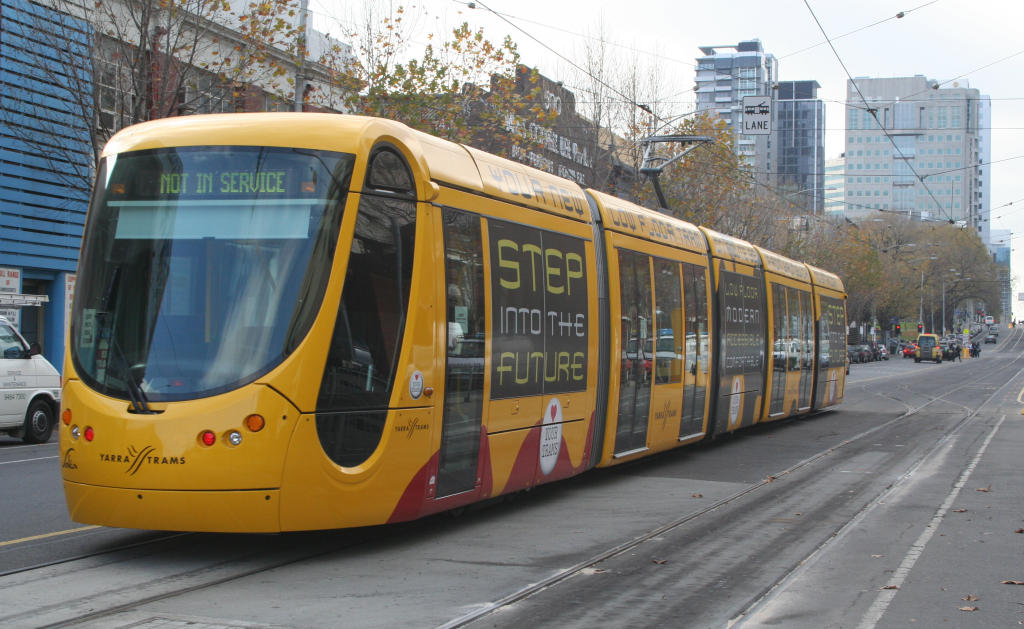
C2 class undergoing testing on La Trobe Street in June 2008

In 2008, an arrangement to lease five low-floor, air-conditioned, bi-directional, five section Alstom Citadis 302 trams was brokered with Mulhouse, France, through Yarra Trams' then French parent, Transdev. The lease agreement was $9 million for four years with shipping costs of $500,000 for each tram, with the first tram arriving in Melbourne in February 2008. The first tram was launched on 11 June 2008. They were quickly nicknamed Bumblebees from their yellow colour and the first was officially named Bumblebee 1 before entering service, with the rest following suit up to Bumblebee 5. All entered service on route 96.

All Citadis trams in Mulhouse are named after municipalities in the Mulhouse Alsace Agglomération, including the five trams that now run in Melbourne:

- Tram no. 5103 (Mulhouse 2003): Bollwiller, now Bumblebee 3
- Tram no. 5106 (Mulhouse 2006): Reiningue, Bumblebee 4
- Tram no. 5111 (Mulhouse 2011): Pulversheim, now Bumblebee 5
- Tram no. 5113 (Mulhouse 2013): Ungersheim, now Bumblebee 2
- Tram no. 5123 (Mulhouse 2023): Battenheim, Bumblebee 1

Being surplus to the demands of Mulhouse, they were originally intended to be leased only until December 2011. However, it was announced in November 2010 that the State Government was in negotiations to acquire the C2-trams, with all five subsequently purchased in 2012/13.

Prior to entering service in Melbourne, they had minor adjustments made at Preston Workshops, including improvements to the air-conditioning and modifications to the Mulhouse livery. They have since been repainted into standard Yarra Trams livery and retain their Bumblebee names on a logo behind the driver's cab.

== Operation ==
C2 class trams operate on the following route:

- 96: East Brunswick to St Kilda Beach
