= E class Melbourne tram =

Class of articulated tram operated in Melbourne, Australia

E Class
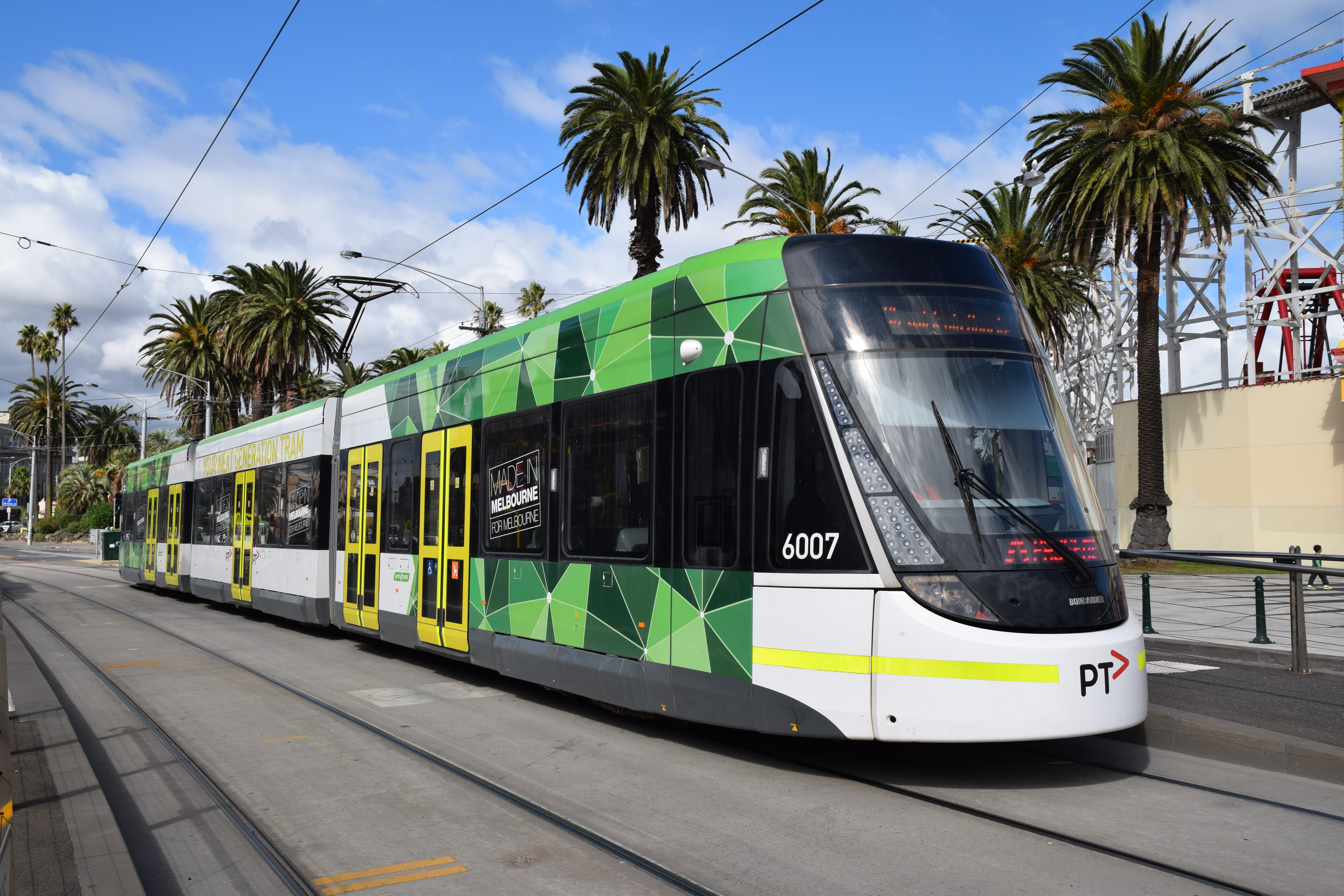
- E.6007 at St Kilda, April 2016

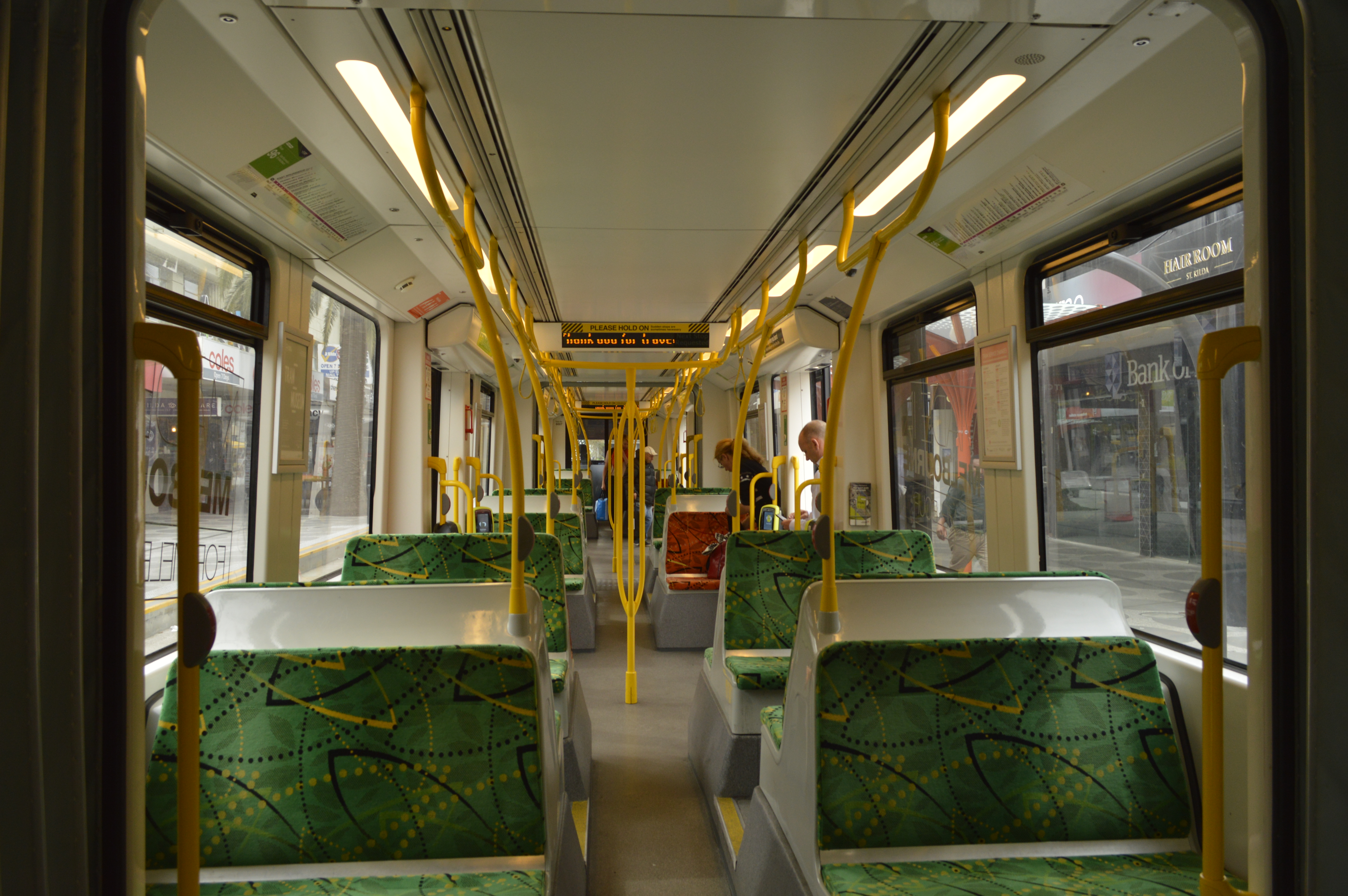
- E Class tram Interior
- Stock type: Articulated tramcar/light rail vehicle
- Manufacturer: Bombardier Transportation/Alstom
- Built at: Dandenong
- Family name: Flexity Swift
- Replaced: All remaining W6, SW6 and W7 trams (excluding City Circle trams), and all remaining Z1 and Z2 trams.
- Constructed: 2013–2021
- Number built: 100
- Number in service: 100
- Fleet numbers: E.6001–E.6100
- Capacity: 64/146 (seated/standing)
- Depots: Preston; Southbank

Specifications
- Train length: 33.45 m (109 ft 9 in)
- Width: 2.65 m (8 ft 8 in)
- Height: 3.65 m (12 ft 0 in)
- Floor height: 305mm (nominal)
- Low-floor: 100%
- Doors: 10 (five per side), all double-leaf
- Articulated sections: 3 sections (two articulations)
- Maximum speed: 80 km/h (50 mph)
- Weight: 62 t (61 long tons; 68 short tons)(with passengers)
- Traction motors: 6 × Bombardier 4-WXA-2257 105 kW (141 hp)
- Power output: 630 kW (840 hp)
- Acceleration: 1.3 m/s^{2} (2.9 mph/s)
- Deceleration: 1.5 m/s^{2} (3.4 mph/s) (Average); 2.8 m/s^{2} (6.3 mph/s) (Emergency)
- Electric systems: 600 V DC (nominal) from overhead catenary
- Current collection: Pantograph
- UIC classification: Bo′+2′Bo′+Bo′
- Bogies: Flexx Urban 3000
- Braking system: Electric (electrodynamic with friction holding)
- Track gauge: 1,435 mm (4 ft 8 1/2 in) standard gauge

The E Class trams are three-section, four-bogie articulated trams that were first introduced to the Melbourne tram network in 2013. They were built at the Dandenong rolling stock factory of Bombardier Transportation (later Alstom) with the propulsion systems and bogies coming from Bombardier/Alstom factories in Germany.

The E Class trams were initially ordered as part of the Tram Procurement Program, an $800 million Victorian Government project aimed at increasing capacity and reliability of the tram network through the introduction of new trams, creation of new depot space, and upgrades to existing infrastructure. In September 2010, 50 were ordered with an option to purchase a further 100. In May 2015, a further 20 were ordered, followed by additional orders for 10 in May 2017, September 2018 and May 2019, taking the total to 100.

The first tram was delivered in June 2013 and, after testing, entered service on route 96 on 4 November 2013.

== History ==
=== Initial Order ===
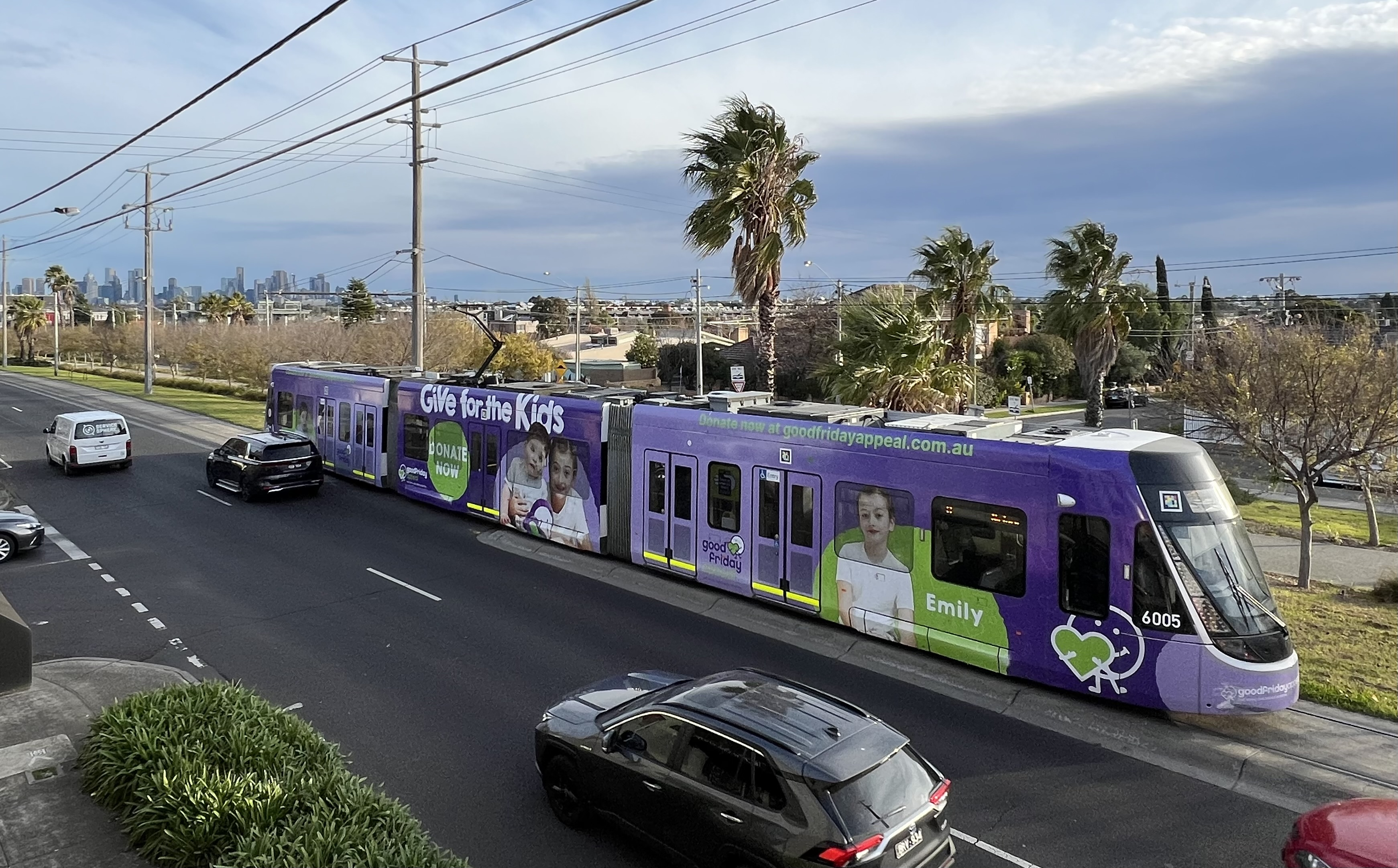
E.6005 in Good Friday Appeal livery, southbound on St Georges Road, June 2024

In July 2009, the Victorian Government called for expressions of interest for the construction of 50 new trams. The expression of interest stipulated that the trams had to be low floor, to comply with the Disability Discrimination Act, that 40% of the total contract was to be local content, and that the first were to enter service in 2012.

In October 2009, Alstom and Bombardier were shortlisted to bid for the contract. The invitation to tender stated the contract had been declared a strategic project, requiring a minimum 25% local manufacturing content, and 50% local content over the life of the contract, with 150 jobs expected to be created.

In September 2010, Bombardier was awarded a contract for 50 low-floor trams based on the Flexity Swift product platform, including maintenance to 2017. The contract included an option for a further 100 vehicles. They were to be built at Bombardier's Dandenong factory with aesthetic design by Bombardier's Brisbane-based Industrial Design team, with propulsion systems and bogies coming from Bombardier's German factories in Mannheim and Siegen respectively. They were the first trams built in Australia in 12 years, and the first locally built Melbourne trams since the delivery of the last B Class in 1994.

A two-thirds life-sized mock-up was produced for design input, and was unveiled on 24 August 2011; it was displayed at the 2011 Royal Melbourne Show. A seven-month delay in delivery was announced in August 2012, with Bombardier stating that design complexity had slowed down construction, and the E Class would be operating from July 2013, with the last tram to be delivered in 2018.

The first E Class tram arrived at the Preston Workshops of Yarra Trams on 28 June 2013, to begin final testing, and was publicly unveiled on 1 July 2013. Testing started in mid-July 2013, and by September 2013 there were two E Class trams at Preston Workshops undergoing non-passenger testing in preparation for introduction to service in late 2013. Two E Class trams entered service on route 96 on 4 November 2013 after an unveiling at Southbank Depot, with a further three in service by January 2014.

In July 2014, it was revealed that Yarra Trams would have to build more substations to cope with the large amount of power that the trams require. E Class trams were introduced to route 11 in June 2015, being housed at East Preston tram depot. The Depot was changed to the recently upgraded Preston Workshops in April 2016. In November 2016, E Class trams were introduced on route 86, sharing the fleet with route 11 (and route 96 to a lesser extent), also from Preston Workshops, later renamed to New Preston Depot.

=== Further Orders ===
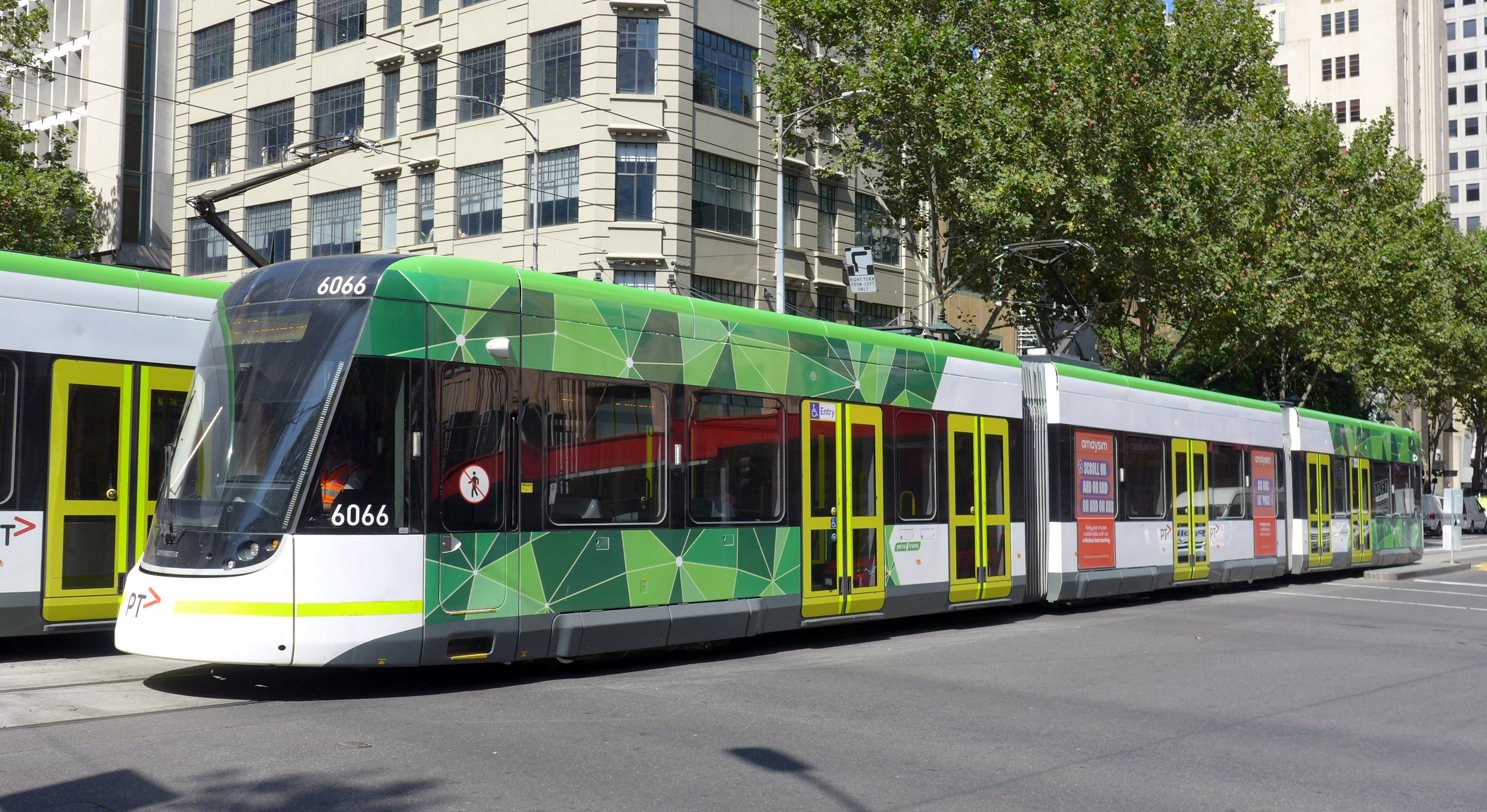
E.6066 in Bourke Street in February 2023

In May 2015, the State Government announced it had ordered a further 20 E Class trams. These were built to an updated design with a focus on improved safety. The design was updated in response to a fivefold increase in injuries relating to passengers mounting and alighting trams, a 50 per cent rise in falls onboard and an eight-year-high for serious injuries.

The redesign implemented measures such as glare reduction and thinner A-pillars either side of the windscreen to allow improved road visibility for drivers, and extra handholds and grab rails for passengers throughout the tram.

In May 2017 a further 10 were ordered, taking the number of trams ordered to 30 for $274 million. The passenger saloon safety modifications were also retrofitted to the first 50 trams in the fleet, as well as a new closed-circuit blind spot camera and screen to improve visibility on trams fitted with the original cab design.

In May 2019, a further 10 were ordered, which together with a previous additional order of another 10 in September 2019, brought the total fleet to 100. In October 2019, E class trams were tested on Route 58.

== Classification and numbering ==
Initially the trams were designated as E Class in accordance with Melbourne's tram classification system, with individual vehicle numbers starting from 6001. However, the updated cab design introduced from tram 6051 was referred to in third-party promotional material as being an "E2 Class" tram which was assumed by enthusiasts to be a separate class, despite no official guidance or reclassification being issued.

As the safety retrofit program occurred concurrent with delivery of trams in later orders, the fleet was eventually upgraded to a consistent level of mechanical, electrical, and passenger amenity, albeit with more than half of the fleet fitted with an 'E2' type cab at one or both ends (including some of the initial 50 trams after significant accidents).

Officially the entire fleet of 100 vehicles are recognised as the E Class. The 'E1 Class' designator is not used, while the 'E2 Class' designator is only used in relation to the upgraded cab design.

== Design ==
The E Class trams are 33.45 m (109 ft 9 in) long, 2.65 m (8 ft 8 in) wide with three articulated units and four bogies, and based on the Bombardier Flexity Swift design with some customisation for Melbourne.

One bogie is located under each end unit, and two are located under the centre unit. The swivelling bogies are enclosed by a "wheelbox" under seats in the passenger area, allowing the tram aisle to remain low-floor throughout. They have anti-slip flooring, air-conditioning, automatic audio-visual announcements, and a passenger capacity of 210.

Other models of Bombardier's Flexity Swift tram of comparable length have four motors with each providing from 120 to 150 kW (160 to 200 hp), however the E class has 6 × 105 kW (141 hp) motors powering three bogies with one bogie unpowered.

Trams 6001-6050 were delivered fitted with the original cab design; while trams 6051 to 6100 were delivered with the updated 'E2' type cab design. As cabs are modular they can be quickly replaced as part of accident repairs. E Class trams that have received one of each different cab type on each end after accidents are occasionally referred to by enthusiasts as 'Catdogs'.

== In service ==
E class trams now operate on routes 11, 30, 58, 86, and 96, but are also used for special events at Melbourne Park, AAMI Park and the Melbourne Cricket Ground on route 70a during and since the 2015 AFC Asian Cup. They are also used to transport spectators to and from Albert Park for the Australian Grand Prix. They run express from Southern Cross Station to the Gates.

E class trams were introduced on route 58 on 19 December 2021.

== Associated works ==
The initial 50 E Class trams formed one part of the Tram Procurement Program package of works designed to increase the capacity and reliability of Melbourne's tram network. Other upgrades included changes to route 96; upgrading the power system; improving accessibility on other low-floor routes; and the redevelopment of Preston Workshops and upgrades to Southbank depot to store and maintain E Class trams.

In anticipation of the E Class trams, a $24 million upgrade at Southbank depot was completed and included upgraded the maintenance and office facilities. Route 96 was upgraded for the E class trams with the construction of accessible stops and with further segregation of trams from cars, and increased tram priority at intersections.
