= Clarendon Street Junction tram stop =

Tram stop in Melbourne, Victoria

Clarendon Street Junction
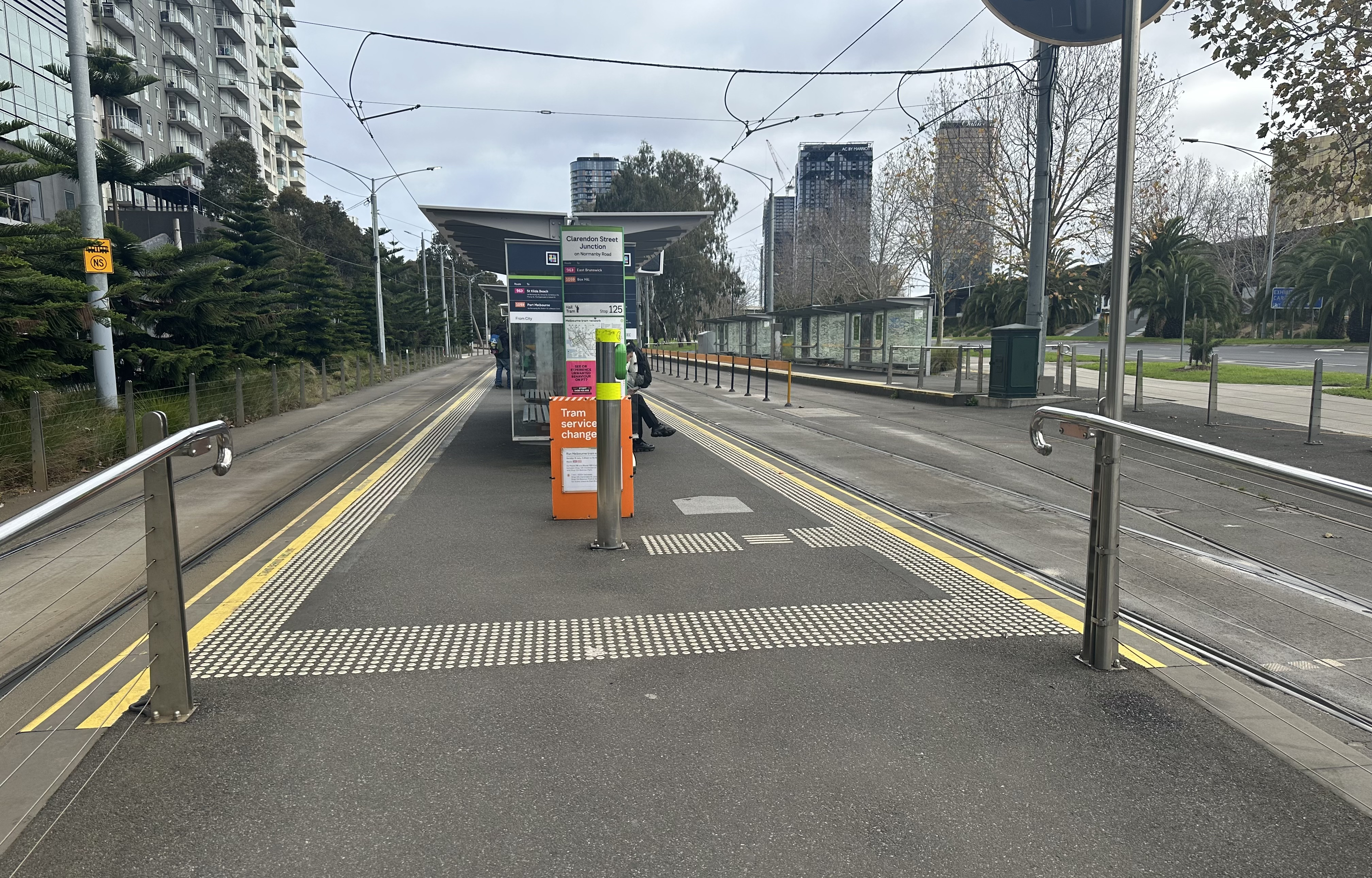
- Clarendon Street Junction in July 2026

General information
- Location: Normanby Road, Southbank; Australia
- Coordinates: 37°49′33.59″S 144°57′22.71″E
- System: PTV tram stop
- Owner: VicTrack
- Operator: Yarra Trams
- Platforms: 3 (1 side, 1 island)
- Tracks: 3
- Tram routes: Melbourne tram route 96 Melbourne tram route 109

Construction
- Structure type: At grade
- Accessible: Yes

Other information
- Status: Operational
- Station code: 125
- Fare zone: Myki zone 1
- Website: Public Transport Victoria

History
- Opened: 21 November 1987
- Rebuilt: 19 January 2016
- Electrified: 600 V DC overhead
- Former names: Port Junction

Services
Preceding station	Yarra Trams	Following station
Casino/MCEC towards East Brunswick	Route 96	City Road towards St Kilda Beach
Casino/MCEC towards Box Hill	Route 109	Southbank tram depot towards Port Melbourne
Location

Clarendon Street Junction is a tram stop located at the intersection of the St Kilda and Port Melbourne light rails with Normanby Road, Whiteman and Clarendon Streets in Southbank, Victoria. It is served by Yarra Trams routes 96 and 109 on the Melbourne tram network. It was also the terminus for the Colonial Tramcar Restaurant.

The original stop of two side platforms was opened in 1987 as an unnamed station, when the Port Melbourne and St Kilda railway lines were converted for tram operation. Sometime during the early 1990s an unofficial sign was erected at the site of the station with the name, "Port Junction." This caught on and eventually became official. In January 2016 it was rebuilt with an island platform and separate platform for the Colonial Tramcar Restaurant. At the same time it was renamed Clarendon Street Junction.

== Tram services ==
Yarra Trams operates two routes via Clarendon Street Junction:

- : East Brunswick – St Kilda Beach
- : Box Hill – Port Melbourne
