= Colonial Tramcar Restaurant =

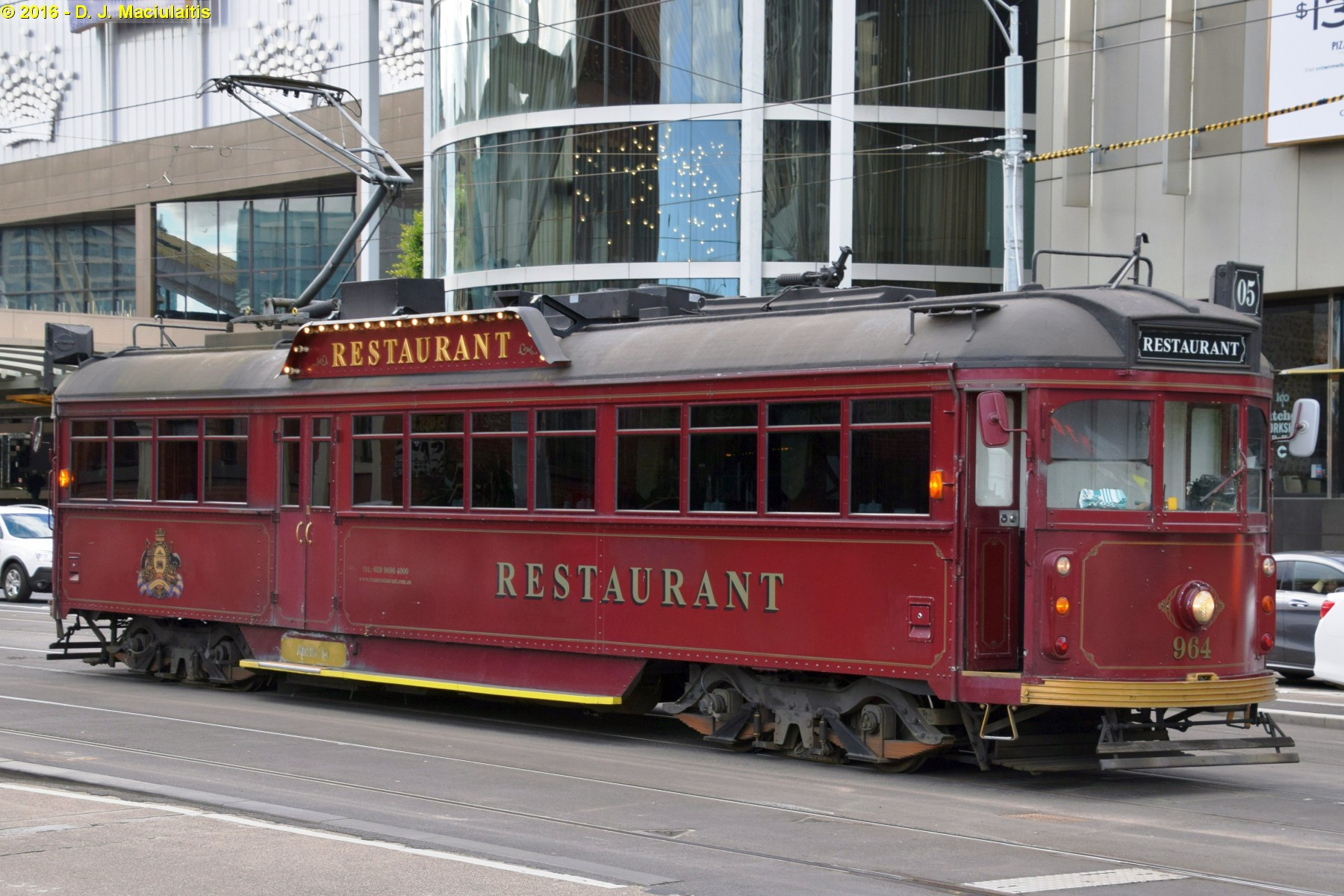

Restaurant information
- Established: 1982; 44 years ago
- Closed: 2018; 8 years ago
- Location: Melbourne, Australia
- Website: www.tramrestaurant.com.au

The Colonial Tramcar Restaurant was a restaurant operating from a converted fleet of three vintage W class trams in Melbourne, Australia from 1982 until 2018.

== History ==
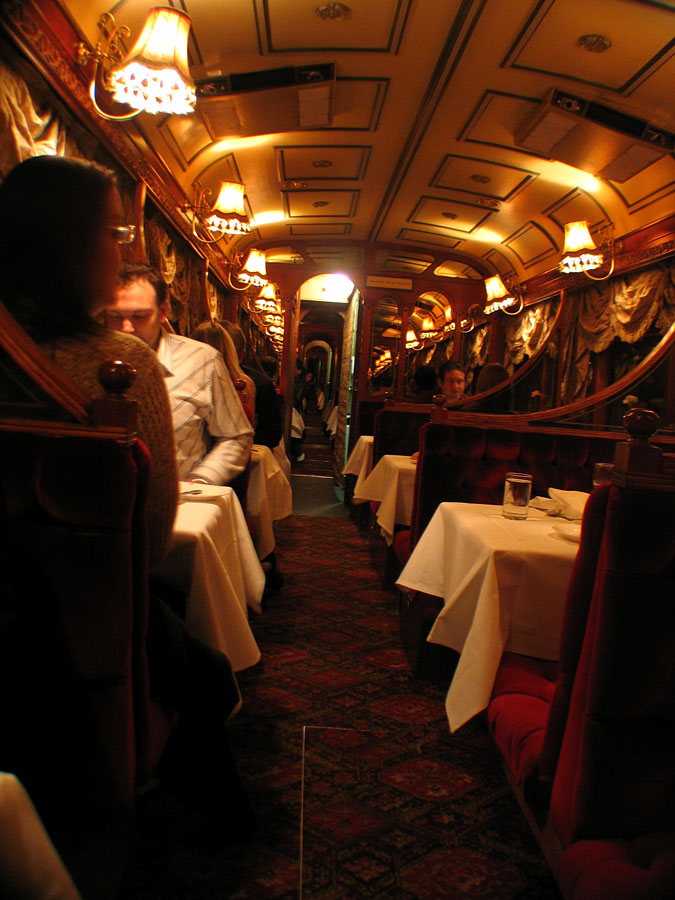
Inside the tram

The Colonial Tramcar Restaurant Company was formed in 1981 by Melburnian businessman Paul Stephen-Daly to operate restaurant trams, with 1927 W2 class tram number 442 acquired for conversion after 55 years of Melbourne & Metropolitan Tramways Board service. Conversion work commenced in 1982 at Preston Workshops, with the drop centre floor raised to give a level floor throughout, and a single entry door provided on one side of the tram. Two saloons were provided either side of a central kitchen and lavatory, one saloon seating 12 while the other seats 24 patrons.

It was based at the Metropolitan Transit Authority's (MTA) South Melbourne depot.

The service started on 2 November 1982 (Melbourne Cup day) with the single tram, as amendments were required to the Liquor Licence Act to allow for the service of alcohol on a mobile restaurant. The driver and conductor were provided by the MTA while onboard staff are Colonial Tramcar Restaurant employees. Until 1992, the restaurant had to carry a conductor to comply with tramways union regulations about two-man teams operating all trams (in case the brakes failed). This conductor cost the Colonial Tramcar Restaurant $50,000 per year until conductors were removed from all trams in the 1990s. One of the conductors was a lady who could be seen knitting throughout the entire service.

Two 1948 SW6 class trams, 937 and 939, were later added to the fleet in October 1992 and February 1995, respectively. With the closure of South Melbourne depot in February 1997, operation was transferred to Southbank depot. In 2006, the 442 was retired and replaced with a third SW6 class tram 938. In 2011 nos 937 and 939 were withdrawn from service and replaced with 935 and 964. All had distinctive burgundy livery, and could seat 36 passengers each.

The restaurant, which had one lunch and two dinner sittings each day, advised booking well in advance. The trams were boarded from the Clarendon Street Junction stop near the Melbourne Convention & Exhibition Centre. They then ran on selected standard tram routes through the city and some nearby inner suburbs, returning to their origin. The ride in the restaurant tram was generally quite steady. Food was prepared offsite in a commercial kitchen and loaded onto the trams in a raw form. Each tram had its own chef and all of the food was cooked as the tram moved. The menu provided a limited choice, as did the wine list. However, unlimited alcohol was included in the fixed, prepaid meal price.

On 11 August 2012, 30 diners and three staff had to be evacuated from restaurant tramcar #05 (SW6.964) after it caught fire in East Melbourne on Nicholson Street.

In 1985, The Colonial Tramcar Restaurant became the first restaurant in Melbourne to ban smoking.

The Colonial Tramcar Restaurant was a four-time winner of the coveted National Tourism Award (1984, 1988, 1992, and 1993). It was also a nine-time winner of the Victorian Tourism Award (1984, 1985, 1986, 1988, 1989, 1991, 1992, 1993, 2002) and was welcomed into the Hall of Fame in 1993. Hall of Fame is awarded to an entrant that has won the same category over three consecutive years.

In October 2018, Yarra Trams announced that the restaurant trams had been withdrawn from service and were no longer allowed to operate on the network due to safety considerations. At the same time, Yarra Trams said it was working with the restaurant operator to enable a "stationary dining experience" to continue.

== Fleet ==
- W2 442 (01): This tram ran as CTR No. 1 and is now stored on a private property.
- SW6 937 (02): This Tram Ran as CTR No. 2, named “The City Of Melbourne” Body and is privately owned.
- SW6 939 (03) This Tram Ran as CTR No. 3, named “Valentine” and is owned by the Ballarat Tramway Museum and in its own “Cuthberts” Livery.
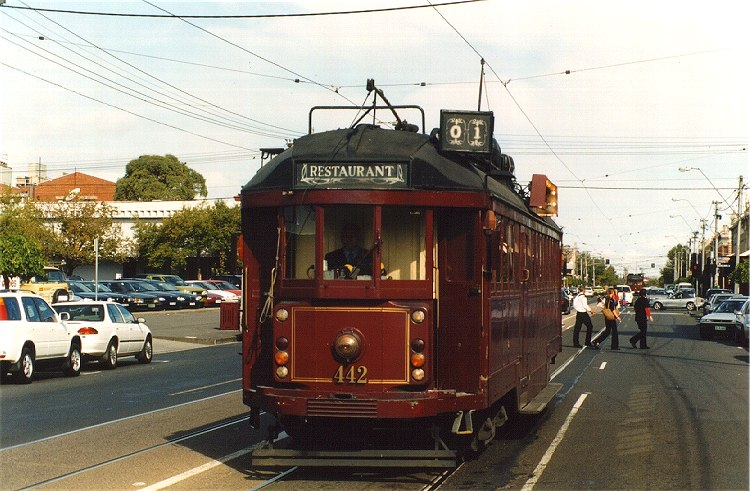
W2 442 (01)

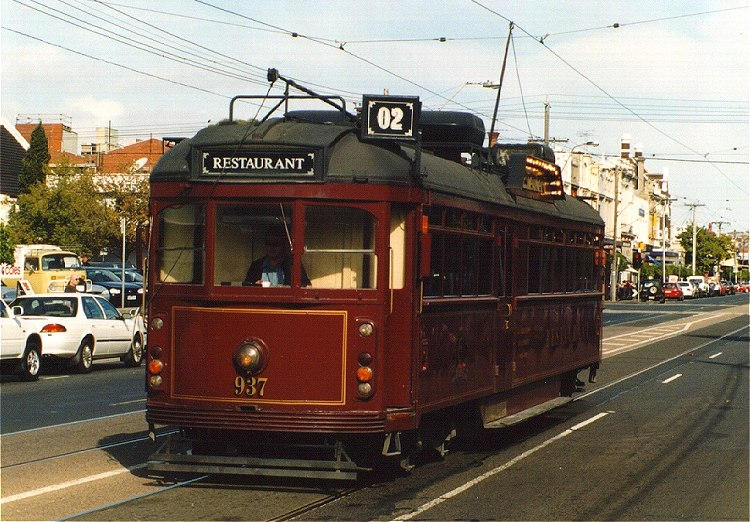
SW6 937 (02)

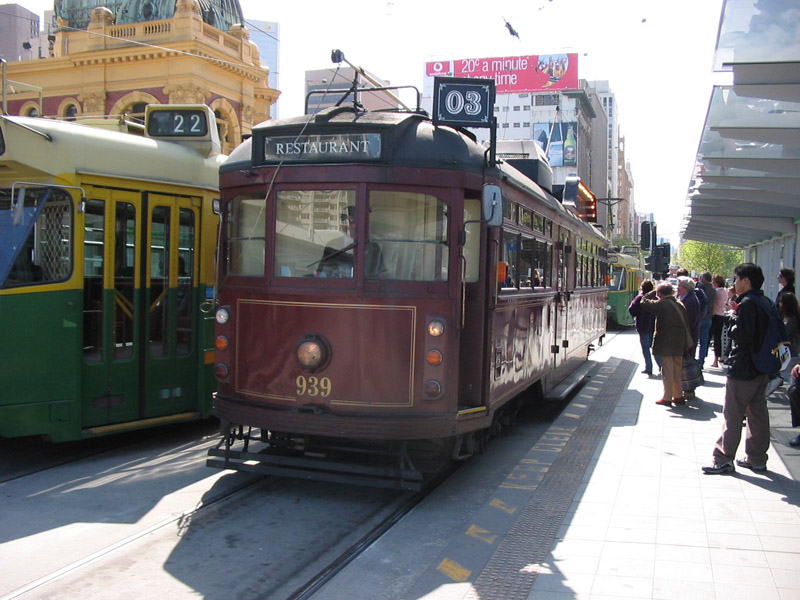
SW6 939 (03)
