= 2007 Spotless dispute =

2007 industrial dispute in New Zealand

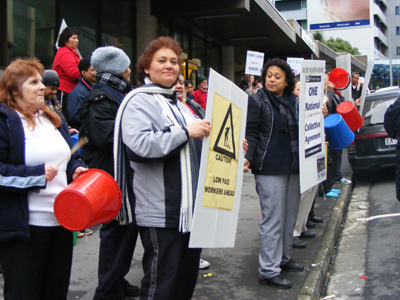
Supporters of the locked out workers picketing Spotless' offices in Wellington

The 2007 Spotless dispute was an industrial dispute between contracting company Spotless and 800 of their employees working at various hospitals around New Zealand and represented by the Service & Food Workers Union.

== Lock out ==
The workers were locked out on July 12 after announcing rolling strikes were to start following the breakdown of employment agreement negotiations. Spotless spokesman Peter Jennings has said that the union had refused to withdraw strike notices and negotiate details of an agreement, while the company also claims the lock out was for health and safety reasons.

== Employment Court case ==
The union took Spotless to the Employment Court, arguing that the lockout was illegal, The lockout was overturned by the court on July 23. Chief Judge Graeme Colgan agreed with the union that Spotless was wrong to ask some employees to make themselves available for work during strike action, which was the basis of the lockout.

According to union spokesperson Alastair Duncan "More lost hours have been generated by Spotless in this one lockout, than the total lost hours of every other industrial dispute in our public hospitals over the past ten years,". The union is currently attempting to claim back lost wages from Spotless, estimated to run to as much as $1 million. The workers returned to work on July 25 and agreed to put further industrial action on hold for at least 48 hours.

== Settlement ==
After the lock out ended Spotless agreed to pay its workers a starting rate of $14.25 an hour, three dollars higher than the minimum wage, and the same wage paid by the three other contractors. New Zealand Herald journalist Simon Collins called the settlement "a breakthrough with potential flow-on effects for thousands of other low-wage workers."
