= Melbourne tram route 86 =

Tram route in metropolitan Melbourne, Victoria, Australia

Route 86

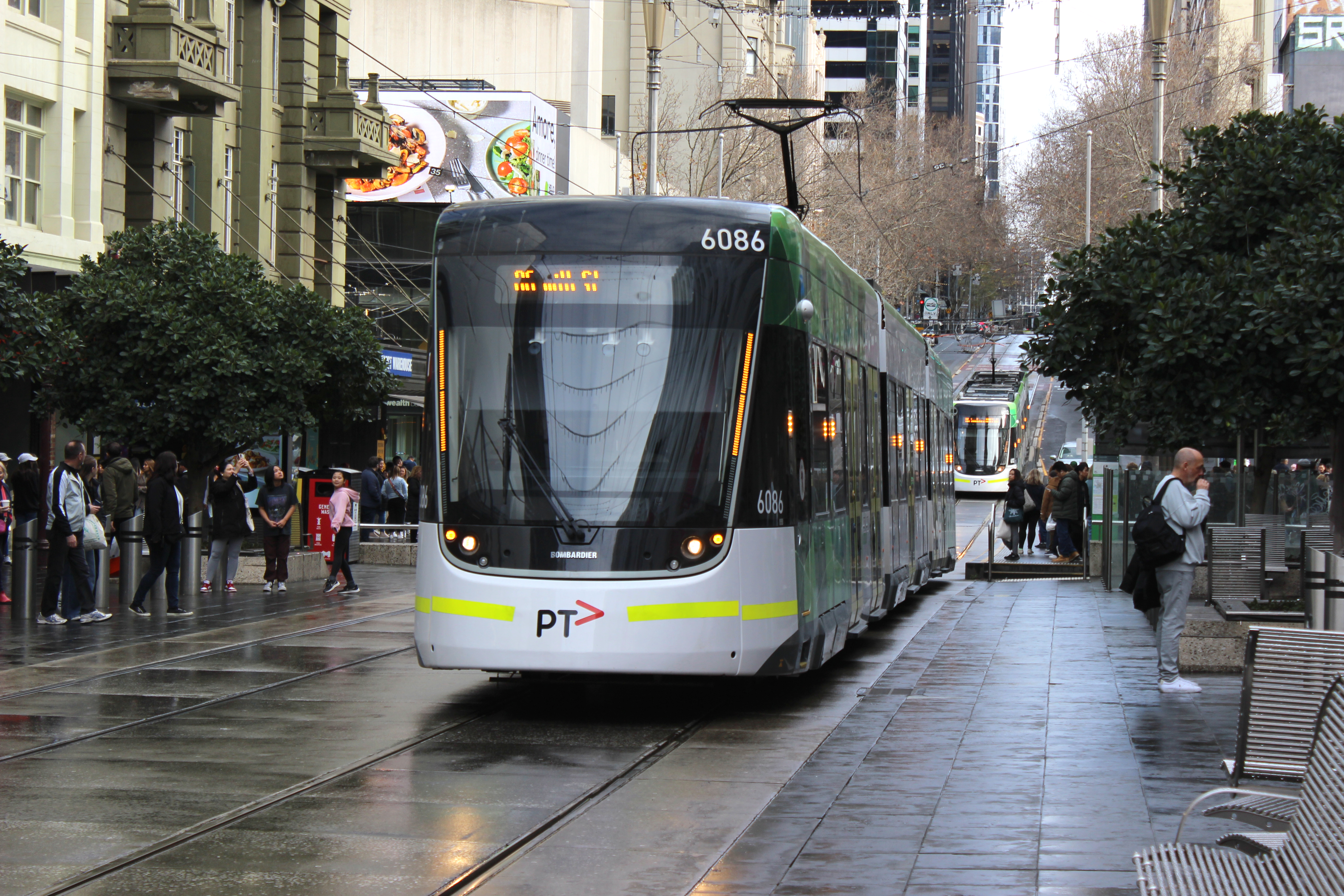
- E class tram at Bourke Street Mall, July 2023

Overview
- System: Melbourne
- Operator: Yarra Trams
- Depot: Preston
- Vehicle: E class
- Night-time: Friday & Saturday

Route
- Start: Bundoora RMIT
- Via: Reservoir; Preston; Thornbury; Northcote; Clifton Hill; Collingwood; Fitzroy; East Melbourne; Bourke Street
- End: Waterfront City
- Length: 22.2 kilometres
- Timetable: Route 86 timetable
- Map: Route 86 map

Melbourne tram route 86 is a tram route on the Melbourne tramway network serving the city of Melbourne in Victoria, Australia. Operated by Yarra Trams, the route is coloured yellow and extends from Bundoora RMIT to Waterfront City over 22.2-kilometre (13.8 mi) of double track via Reservoir, Preston, Thornbury, Northcote, Clifton Hill, Collingwood, Fitzroy, East Melbourne and Bourke Street. It is serviced out of Preston depot utilising E class trams.

== History ==
The line had its beginnings as two separate cable tram lines. The first was part of Melbourne’s main cable tram system, built by the Melbourne Tramway & Omnibus Company (MTOC) in the late 1880s. This system included the 'Collingwood & Clifton Hill' line, which operated along Bourke Street in the city, then Gertrude Street, Smith Street, and Queens Parade to a terminus just short of the Northcote Bridge (Merri Creek Bridge), which opened on 10 August 1887.

A second line, which was a continuation of this line, was built privately by a group of Northcote land speculators, which ran from near the MTOC terminus, across the bridge, up High Street, to Miller Street/Dundas Street, the boundary between Northcote and Preston, which opened on opened on 18 February 1890. Since the lines were built to different standards, passengers had to physically walk between the two termini at the Northcote Bridge to get from Northcote to the city. The line was not as successful as they had hoped, and it closed down and reopened twice before Northcote City Council bought it in 1901 and leased out its operation, and at the end of the lease in 1916 the council took over operation for a short time.

At the end of the MTOC lease in 1916, the State Government took control of their system, vesting them into the Melbourne & Metropolitan Tramways Board (MMTB) on 1 November 1919, which then absorbed all the municipal systems, including the Northcote cable car line, on 20 February 1920.

An electric tram system that extended beyond the cable tram lines in Preston had been started by the municipal Fitzroy, Northcote & Preston Tramways Trust but it wasn't until after its takeover by the MMTB that services first ran, on 1 April 1920. This system included a line along High Street Preston from Tyler Street south to the Dundas Street cable tram terminus, then west along Miller Street and south along St George’s Road to the terminus of the North Fitzroy cable tram line. This network was orphaned from the rest of the electric network until 24 March 1925 when a line west along Holden Street connected it to the CBD via Lygon Street.

At the same time, the two cable lines were connected into one line by the MMTB, creating the longest line in the city, opening 8 March 1925. It operated until 26 October 1940, when the Bourke Street cable lines were abandoned in favour of double decker buses. The Bourke Street cable lines were the last cable trams to operate in Melbourne.

The MMTB, unhappy with the performance of the buses, decided to rebuild the lines as electric tram services when the buses became life expired. It opened as route 88 (predecessor to the modern 86) on 26 June 1955, with Brunswick East starting operating on 6 May 1956.

On 18 May 1983, the suburban terminus was extended 1.2 kilometres from Tyler Street to Boldrewood Parade, then to 2.1 kilometres to La Trobe University on 10 January 1985 (when it was renumbered as route 87), 2.9 kilometres to McLeans Road on 26 April 1987, when it was renumbered route 86 and to the current terminus at McKimmies Road on 12 October 1995. This final extension was funded as part of the Federal Government's Building Better Cities program.

As part of the Docklands redevelopment project, La Trobe Street was extended west over the Spencer Street railyards on 26 March 2000, and with this extension route 86 was extended north along Spencer Street and then west along La Trobe Street to Docklands Stadium. On 4 May 2003, the route was slightly extended to the south to terminate at Central Pier parallel to Harbour Esplanade.

Between May and November 2005, route 86 was temporarily extended to Waterfront City to replace a truncated section of route 48 between Central Pier and Waterfront City. During this time, the latter temporarily terminated at Market Street due to the closure and removal of the Flinders Street Overpass over King Street. The temporary arrangement ceased with the completion of works in November 2005.

On 27 July 2008, route 30 and route 86 swapped termini, with route 30 terminating in Harbour Esplanade at Central Pier, and route 86 extended to Waterfront City again, but on a permanent basis.

In August 2008 route 86 was the first route to see tram based testing of the Myki ticketing system, using special services not open to normal fare-paying passengers.

A project to improve access through platform stops, perform track and overhead renewal and improve speed and reliability on a 6.8 km section of route 86, along High Street and Plenty Road, between Westgarth Street, Westgarth and Albert Street, Reservoir commenced in 2011.

In January 2016, route 86 began operating through the night on Fridays and Saturdays as part of the Night Network.

In November 2016, E class trams commenced operation on the route. These trams are beneficial on the route which has the highest amount of superstop platforms of any route in Melbourne.

Melbourne tram route 86 evolution
Dates	Route	Notes
2 May 1954 - 28 February 1983	Footscray to West Maribyrnong	
1 March 1983 - 25 April 1987	Unallocated	
26 April 1987 - 11 October 1995	Bundoora (McLeans Road) to City (Spencer Street)	The first time 86 was used to designate the route that it currently takes today (renumbered from 87)
12 October 1995 - 25 March 2000	Bundoora RMIT to City (Spencer Street)	
26 March 2000 - 3 May 2003	Bundoora RMIT to Docklands Stadium (La Trobe Street)	
4 May 2003 - 26 July 2008	Bundoora RMIT to Central Pier (Harbour Esplanade)	Temporarily extended to Waterfront City between 22 May and 20 November 2005 to replace a temporarily truncated route 48
27 July 2008 – present	Bundoora RMIT to Waterfront City	

== Route ==
Interactive map of Melbourne tram route 86.

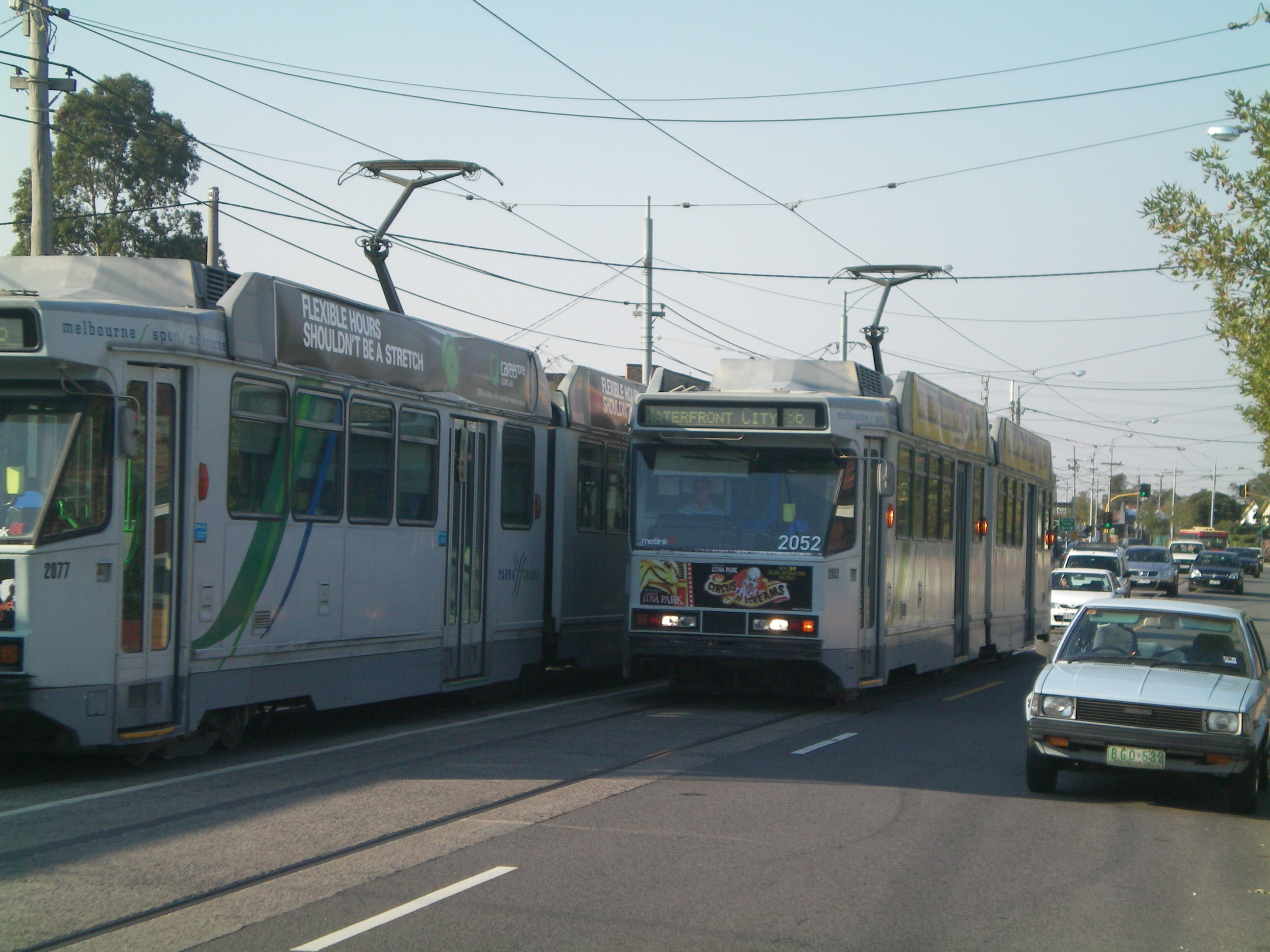
Two route 86 trams pass each other on Plenty Road, Preston

Route 86 runs from Bundoora RMIT, travelling south on Plenty Road through the suburbs of Bundoora, Reservoir and Preston, passing La Trobe University.

Plenty Road ends in Preston at Dundas Street and High Street, route 86 turns slightly into High Street and continues south through Thornbury and Northcote. It then crosses Merri Creek, continuing along Queens Parade Clifton Hill, heading south-west, turning south into Smith Street passing between Fitzroy and Collingwood.

Just before the end of Smith Street it turns west into Gertrude Street, Fitzroy, and south into Nicholson Street, Carlton, past the Royal Exhibition Building.

It enters the CBD on Spring Street turning west into Bourke Street at Parliament House, travels through the Bourke Street Mall and turns north into Spencer Street, passing Southern Cross station, it turns west at La Trobe Street, passing over the Spencer Street rail yards into Docklands, it travels north briefly on Harbour Esplanade before turning west into Docklands Drive, where it terminates at Waterfront City.

== Operation ==
Route 86 is operated out of Preston depot with E class trams. Between 1990 and 2016, it was operated out of East Preston depot with B class trams.

== In popular culture ==
In 2010 Melbourne-based musical comedian The Bedroom Philosopher released an album Songs from the 86 Tram inspired by the tram route as well as an award-winning comedy show of the same name.

Courtney Barnett and Giles Field's 2011 song "I Can't Hear You, We're Breaking Up" is set on the 86 tram route, featuring an ill-fated romance that begins with a 'Hollywood meeting on the 86 tram'.

== Route 95 ==
Until 27 July 2014 additional capacity through the Melbourne CBD was provided by route 95 short workings from Melbourne Museum to Spencer Street via Bourke Street between 12:00 and 14:00 on weekdays.
