= Individual flexibility agreement =

An individual flexibility agreement (IFA) is an agreement that can be reached between employer and employee under the Fair Work Act. It is an agreement made between a single employer and an individual employee. This agreement alters some of the terms of an award or agreement and it must leave the employee better off overall with the IFA than without it.

The power to make an IFA comes from the flexibility clause in the modern award. The Fair Work Act requires every Modern Award and Enterprise Agreement to include a "test flexibility clause". In theory, this clause enables an employer and employee to agree on an IFA which varies the effect of the award or agreement so that it can "meet the genuine needs of the employer and that individual employee" in an individual context.

Employers are prohibited from using undue influence or pressure, coercion, threats, discrimination or taking adverse action against an employee to make them sign. Nor can employers insist upon an employee agreeing to an IFA as a condition of employment or lose out on opportunities such as overtime or shifts with increased penalty rates attached.

== Spotless and IFAs ==
One notable case of public resistance to IFAs occurred with the Spotless Group. In 2011, the Spotless Group became the focus of an industrial relations test case in Australia after claims of bullying and harassment surrounding Spotless’ use of IFAs, were raised by members of United Voice, the union that represents contract cleaners employed by Spotless at shopping centres, CBD buildings and other privately and publicly owned buildings.
