= Southbank tram depot =

Tram depot in metropolitan Melbourne, Victoria, Australia

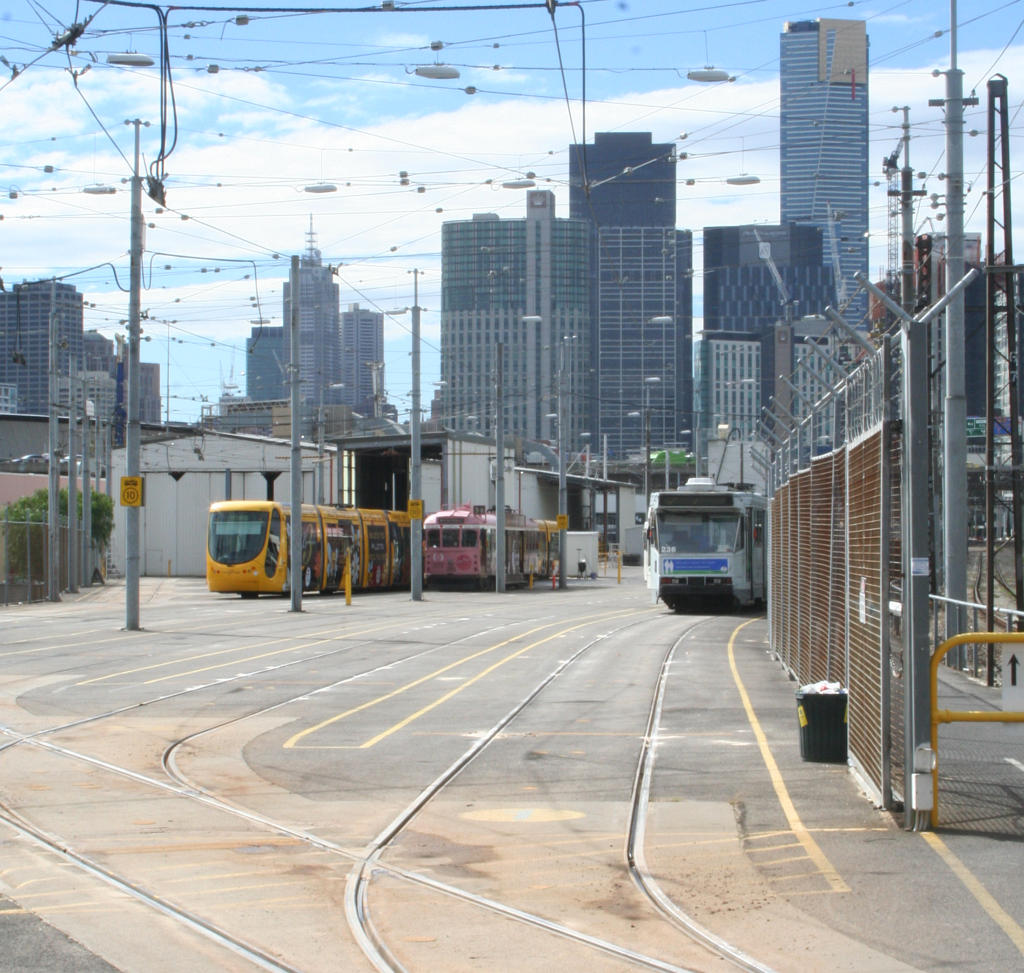
- Entry to the depot, viewing Melbourne CBD, August 2008
- Interactive map of Southbank tram depot

Location
- Location: Normanby Road, Southbank

Characteristics
- Owner: VicTrack
- Operator: Yarra Trams
- Depot code: S
- Roads: 9 (2 in workshops, 7 outside)
- Rolling stock: 23 A1 Class; 2 A2 Class; 5 C2 Class; 2 E Class; 26 E2 Class; 12 W8 Class
- Routes served: 12, 30, 35, 58 (shared with Essendon), 96 (shared with Preston)

History
- Opened: 8 February 1997

Southbank tram depot is located in Southbank, a suburb of Melbourne, Victoria, Australia. Operated by Yarra Trams, it is one of eight tram depots on the Melbourne tram network.

== History ==
Southbank tram depot opened on 8 February 1997 on the site of the former Montague shipping shed replacing South Melbourne depot. When the Public Transport Corporation was privatised in August 1999, Southbank depot passed to Yarra Trams. The depot was extended in 2009 as part of the E-class tram project.

== Layout ==
The main yard has nine roads, two of these inside a maintenance shed. There are also two stabling roads for the three Colonial Tramcar Restaurant cars, which also operate from this depot. Two entrances exist, East Gate and West Gate.

== Rolling stock ==
As of May 2024, the depot has an allocation of 68 trams:

- 23 A1 Class trams
- 2 A2 Class trams
- 5 C2 Class trams
- 2 E Class trams
- 26 E2 Class trams
- 12 W8 Class trams

Servicing of Z3-class trams from other depots is performed at Southbank, however these trams are not used on Southbank routes.

== Routes ==
The following routes are operated from Southbank depot:

- : Victoria Gardens to St Kilda
- : St Vincent's Plaza to Central Pier Docklands
- : City Circle
- : West Coburg to Toorak shared with Essendon depot
- : East Brunswick to St Kilda Beach (shared with Preston depot)

== Light rail station ==
Southbank Tram Depot

General information
- Location: Southbank, Victoria 3006
- Coordinates: 37°49′39″S 144°57′14″E
- Owner: VicTrack
- Operator: Yarra Trams
- Line: Port Melbourne
- Platforms: 2 (2 side)
- Tracks: 2

Construction
- Structure type: At grade
- Accessible: Yes

Other information
- Status: Operational
- Station code: 125A
- Fare zone: Myki Zone 1

History
- Electrified: 600 V DC overhead

Services
Preceding station	Yarra Trams	Following station
Clarendon Street Junction towards Box Hill	Route 109	Montague Street towards Port Melbourne
Location

A light rail station with the same name is located approximately 250 metres from the depot, located along Normanby Road and on the former Port Melbourne railway line.

Yarra Trams operates one route via Southbank Tram Depot light rail station:

- : Box Hill – Port Melbourne
