= AE Smith =

Australian air conditioning company 1898 - 2015

- Type: Mechanical services contractor
- Industry: Construction
- Founded: Melbourne, Australia 1898
- Headquarters: Melbourne, Australia
- Key people: Brian Pollock (Chairman of the Board); Andrew Permezel (CEO)
- Services: Air Conditioning & Mechanical Services; Environmental Controls & Building Technologies; Sustainability & Energy Services
- Number of employees: 700+ 2009
- Website: www.aesmith.com.au

AE Smith is a commercial air-conditioning and mechanical services contractor in Australia focusing on heating, ventilation, air-conditioning, electrical, controls, fire protection, construction and commissioning. The company employs over 1,100 people today and was acquired by Spotless Group in 2015.

== History ==
AE Smith was founded in Richmond, Victoria, Australia in 1898 by Albert Edward Smith (1871–1923). Albert Smith was a qualified plumber. The establishment of the Melbourne and Metropolitan Board of Works (MMBW) in 1891 and Melbourne's first underground sewerage system facilitated considerable growth in the plumbing industry and the success of the company itself.

Albert Edward Smith was succeeded by his son, Albert Edward Smith Junior (or Bert Smith). Bert served the company for over 40 years, in which time he extended the services of the business to include heating, ventilation and air conditioning. This significantly expanded the scope of the business and enabled it to take on larger projects.

== Expansion ==
Bert Smith's son, Barry Smith, took leadership of the company in 1953, initiating an era which witnessed the expansion of the company across Australia and abroad. By the end of the 20th century, AE Smith gained significant recognition as a mechanical services company after taking part in many landmark projects involving shopping centres, hotels, universities hospitals in the city of Melbourne. This success resulted in a new branch being opened in Hobart in 1967, followed by offices in Brisbane, Gold Coast, Sydney, Mackay, Townsville, Perth and abroad in Auckland, New Zealand.

In February 2015 Spotless Group Holdings acquired AE Smith in order to strengthen their capabilities in air-conditioning and mechanical services.

== See also ==
- CIAT Group
