= Smith Street, Melbourne =

Street in Melbourne, Australia

Coordinates: 37°48′0″S 144°59′3″E

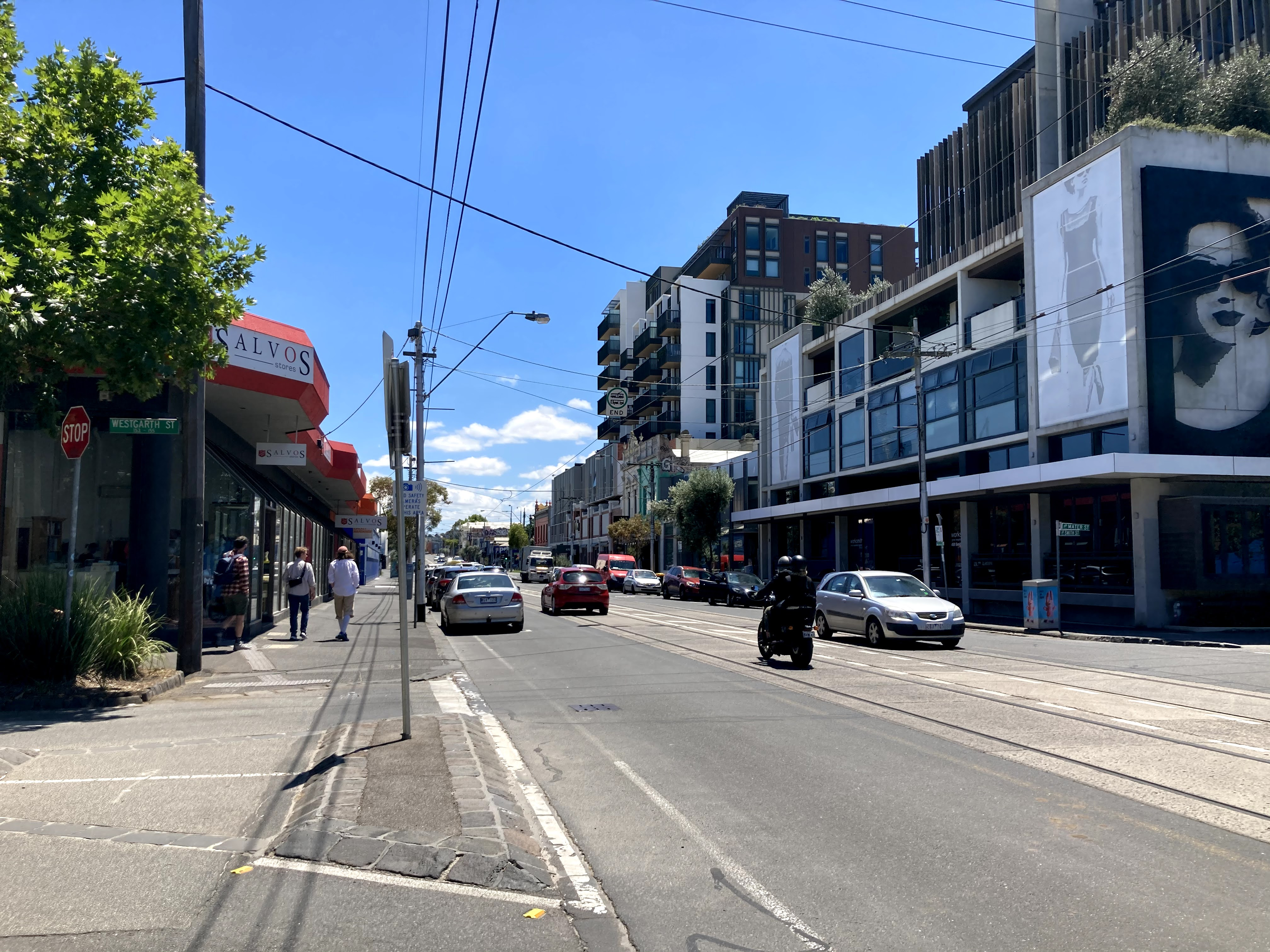
Smith Street looking north from Westgarth Street, Fitzroy

Smith Street is a street in inner northern Melbourne, running north from the city proper and separating Fitzroy from Collingwood.

== Geography ==
Smith Street looking north from Gertrude Street, Collingwood

Smith Street runs north–south from Victoria Parade at its southernmost end to Queens Parade. Between Victoria Parade and Alexandra Parade, it forms the boundary between Fitzroy and Collingwood; the short segment north of Alexandra Parade is in Clifton Hill. Smith Street is located a block east of Brunswick Street. From Gertrude Street to Queens Parade, Smith Street forms part of tram route 86.

== History ==
The road now known as Smith Street was originally a winding dirt track running from Bourke Street, Melbourne, to Heidelberg, and was known as the Eastern Road or Heidelberg Road. The road was placed on its current straight course as part of Melbourne's first suburban land subdivision of 1838. On 23 May 1851, the road was renamed Smith Street, after John Thomas Smith, a seven-time mayor of Melbourne. By the 1860s, Smith Street was a busy and popular suburban shopping strip.

Smith Street contains restaurants and cafés and also has numerous shops selling cheap household goods. North of Johnston Street there are factory outlets selling athletic and fashion clothing. This include brands such as Nike and Adidas. Parts of Smith Street also serve as a meeting place for the local Indigenous Australian community. Smith Street is somewhat more downmarket than nearby Brunswick Street and has not become as fashionable though it is slowly gentrifying.

During the late 1990s, Smith Street was frequented by heroin users and dealers. This earned it the sobriquet 'Smack Street', which, whilst arguably no longer apt, has stuck.

In the last few years a number of bars and clubs have emerged on Smith Street, including “a bar called Barry”, “Scarlet” and until its closure in 2004; the all night venue Republika.

The street has been honoured of late by the rise of the local band The Smith Street Band, which has received international acclaim. This is despite the lead singer recently claiming that "none of us live [on Smith Street] and now everyone time I go there I get quite frustrated that it seems to be becoming more and more gentrified."

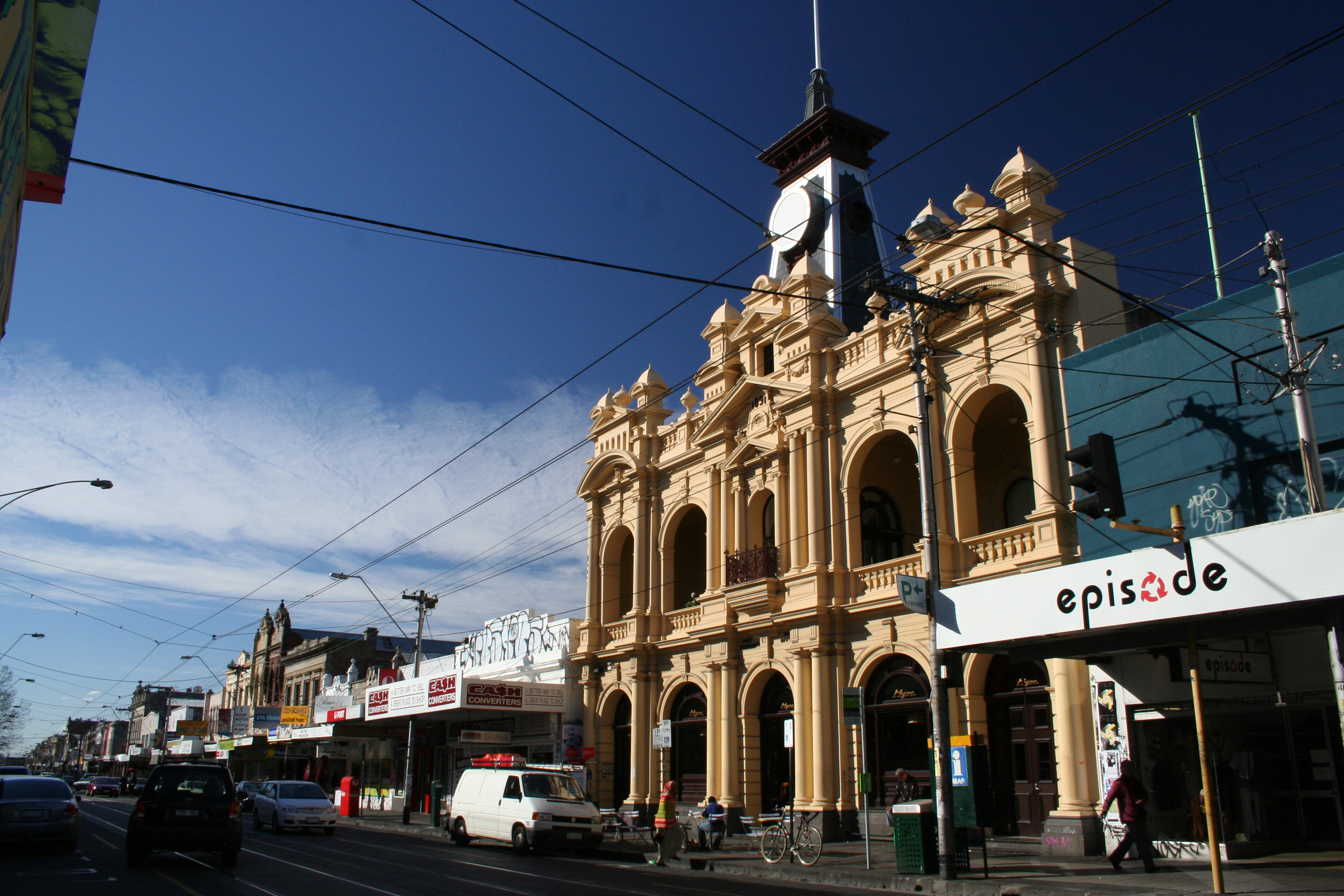
Smith Street with the old post office in the foreground

== Landmarks ==
Left-wing community radio station 3CR has its offices in Smith Street, south of Gertrude Street. Music-oriented community radio station 3PBS is also located nearby, in Easey Street, Collingwood.

It was also home to the first ever Coles Variety Store, and a large, new Coles supermarket opened in 2015 partly behind a reconstructed 1930s Coles facade.
