= Amy Erica Smith =

American political scientist (born 1976)

Academic background
- Education: University of Texas at Austin; Cornell University; University of Pittsburgh

Academic work
- Discipline: Political science
- Sub-discipline: Comparative politics; Brazil studies
- Institutions: Iowa State University
- Main interests: Politics of Brazil; religion in Brazil; religion in politics

Amy Erica Smith is an American political scientist.

== Education and academic career ==
Smith was born in Eugene, Oregon, and raised in Dallas, Texas. She earned a bachelor's degree in Latin American studies at the University of Texas at Austin, obtained a master's degree in city and regional planning at Cornell University, then pursued doctoral studies in political science at the University of Pittsburgh. Smith moved to Ames, Iowa, in 2012, and began teaching at Iowa State University as an assistant professor of political science. In 2018, she became an associate professor. Since 2019, Smith has served as a Liberal Arts and Sciences Dean's Professor. In 2024, Smith was promoted to a full professorship.

=== Fellowships, awards, and honors ===
In 2014, Smith received a Fulbright Fellowship and was based in Brazil. From 2016 to 2017, she held a fellowship at the University of Notre Dame's Kellogg Institute for International Studies. In 2019, Smith was awarded a fellowship by the American Council of Learned Societies. In 2020, Smith became the first Iowa State University faculty member to be awarded a Carnegie Fellowship. That same year, Smith was also a fellow of the Woodrow Wilson International Center for Scholars.

== Political career ==
In November 2021, Smith was the leading vote-getter of three candidates elected to the Ames School Board. She did not run for reelection in November 2025.

== Personal life ==
Smith is married to the Romanian-born software engineer and artist Tibi Chelcea. They first met in Pennsylvania, while he was employed by Carnegie Mellon University and she studied at the University of Pittsburgh. Chelcea began making art in the late 2000s, and is a member of the art collective Ames C.art. He helped organize an art exhibit during a sesquicentennial celebration marking the platting of Ames.

Smith speaks Spanish, Portuguese, and Romanian.

== Selected publications ==
- Smith, Amy Erica (2019). Religion and Brazilian Democracy: Mobilizing the People of God. Cambridge University Press. ISBN 9781108640619.
