= Preston Workshops =

Heritage-listed tram depot and workshops in Melbourne, Victoria, Australia

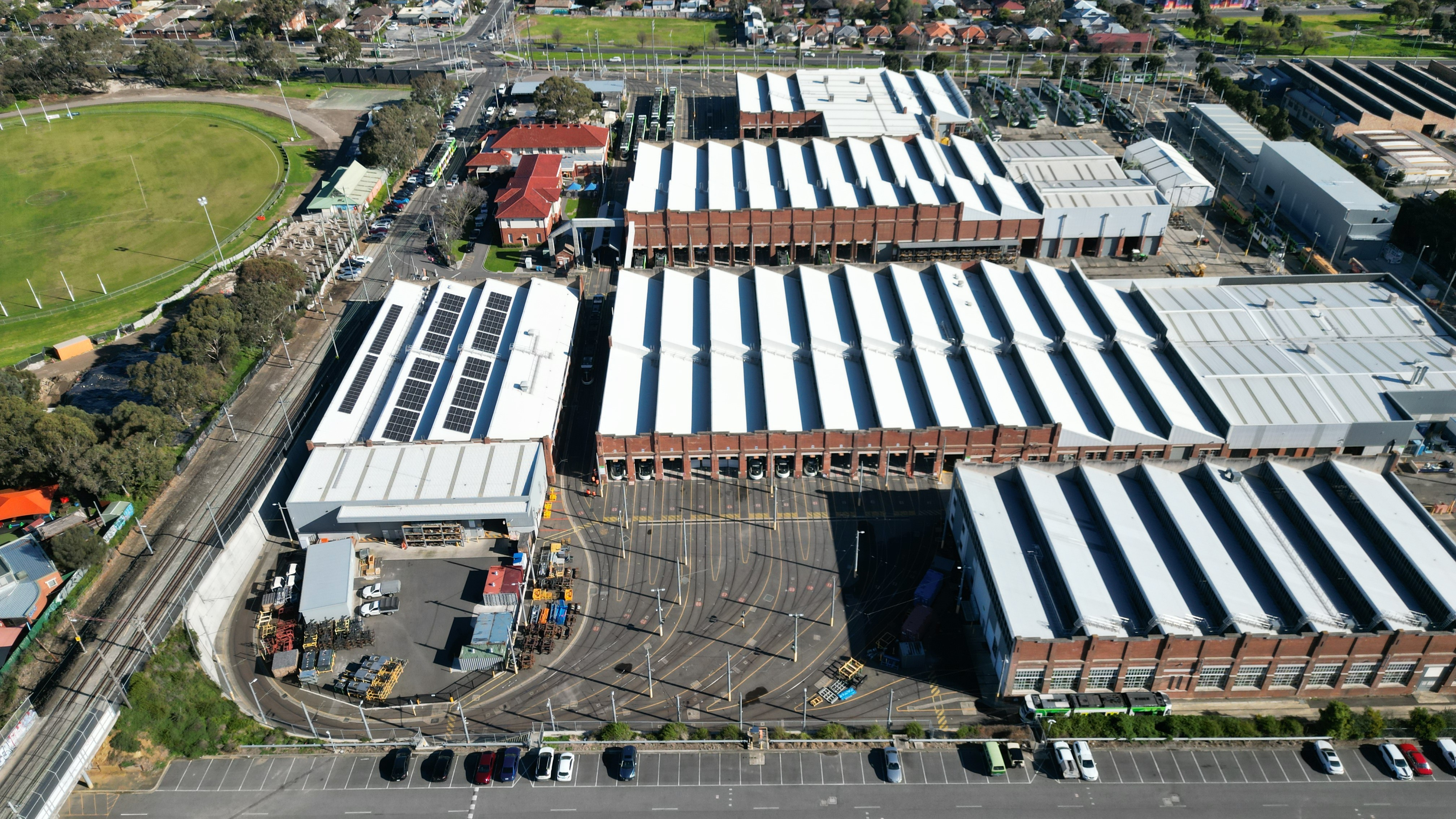
- Aerial view of the depot and workshop in 2023

- Location of the workshops in Greater Metropolitan Melbourne
- Interactive map of Preston Workshops

Location
- Location: 16–18 Miller Street, Preston, City of Darebin, Melbourne, Victoria, Australia
- Coordinates: 37°45′06″S 144°59′51″E

Characteristics
- Owner: VicTrack
- Operator: Yarra Trams; Alstom Australia
- Depot code: P
- Type: Melbourne trams; Workshop and depot
- Rolling stock: 48 x E Class; 24 x E2 Class

History
- Opened: 1926; 100 years ago

Preston Workshops
- A tractor pushing an A-class tram in the workshops, in 2020

History
- Built: 1924–1926
- Built for: Melbourne & Metropolitan Tramways Board

Site notes
- Architectural style: Inter-War Functional

Victorian Heritage Register
- Official name: Preston Tramway Workshops
- Type: Registered place
- Designated: 9 October 2003
- Reference no.: H2031
- Heritage overlay no.: HO144
- Heritage inventory no.: H7822-0960
- Category: Transport - Tramways

The Preston Workshops, also known as the Preston Tramway Workshops and, since 2016, as the New Preston Depot, is the heavy maintenance facility for the Melbourne tram network. The workshop is located on a block surrounded by Miller Street, St Georges Road, Oakover Road and the Mernda railway line in Preston, in the City of Darebin, in the northern suburbs of Melbourne, Victoria, Australia. Following a major redevelopment in April 2016, it also became an operational depot as the New Preston Depot, that replaced the East Preston depot.

Built between 1924 and 1928 on the traditional lands of the Wurundjeri Woi-wurrung people, the workshops were added to the Victorian Heritage Register on 9 October 2003 in recognition of their historical, technological, architectural, and social significance; and were also added to a non-statutory list by the Victorian branch of the National Trust on 8 August 2001.

== History ==
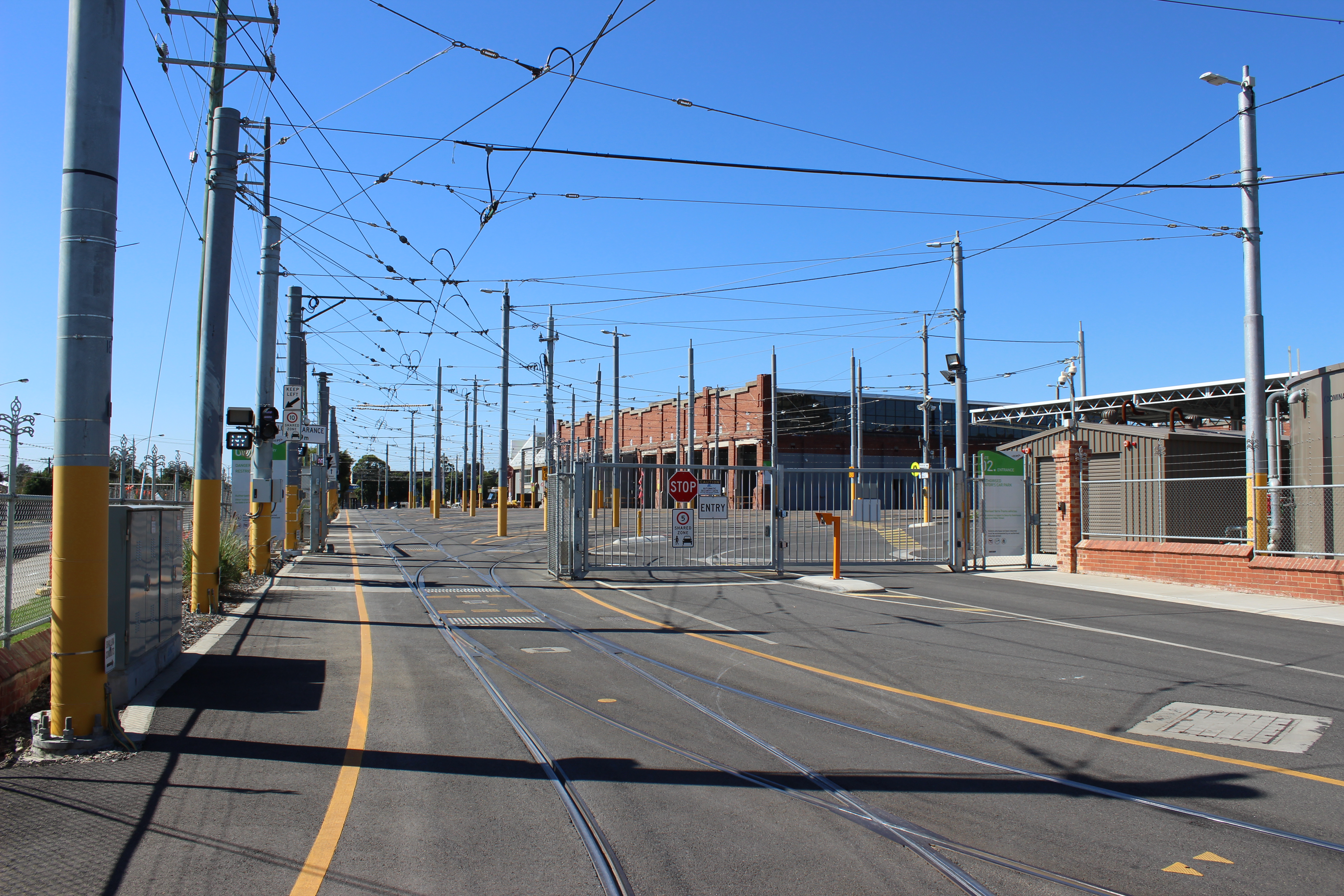
Preston tram depot in 2018

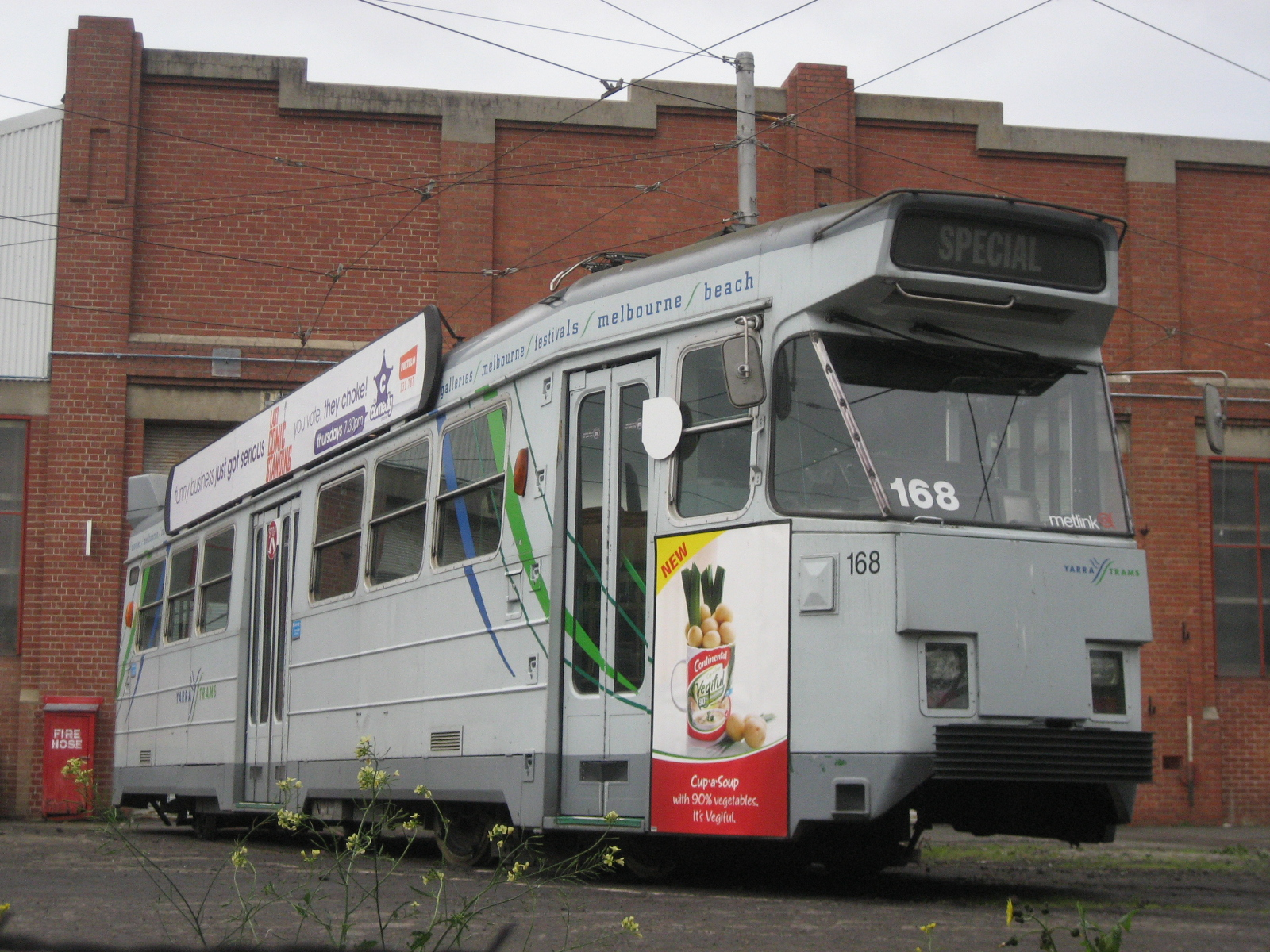
Z3 168 at Preston Workshops, August 2007

The Preston Workshops were erected by the Melbourne & Metropolitan Tramways Board (MMTB) between 1924 and 1926, to provide manufacturing and maintenance facilities for Melbourne's trams in conjunction with the introduction and production of the W class trams.

The earlier tram maintenance workshops were located on the corner of Holden Street and St Georges Road, Fitzroy, where today only a tramways substation remains, following demolition and sale in 1937.

In the mid-1920s, the MMTB sought a suitable place to build its own tramcars, having previously manufactured the steel chassis and truck frames at the Cable Repair Workshops at Nicholson Street, Fitzroy North, built the wooden bodywork in temporary sheds behind the Fitzroy cable car shed, done painting and varnishing at Preston and Glenhuntly depots, and let tenders to private companies for completed bodies. The running maintenance and overhaul was conducted at workshops attached to the Malvern, Hawthorn, Coburg and Essendon depots.

A single comprehensive workshop was desperately needed, and a site was ultimately chosen opposite Thornbury depot on St Georges Road adjacent to the Miller Street line, that covered 6.9 hectares (17 acres). Tenders were let progressively for each building - the paint and car erecting shops and first traverser completed early in 1925; the main store and sub-station in 1925–1926; the large truck, wheel, machine, fitting and electrical shops and second traverser to the car shop in late 1926; the timber storage racks, office block, blacksmiths and plate shops, foundry and pattern shop in the next few months; and finally the mess hall and amenities.

Preston became the most modern tramway workshop in Australia and took over the maintenance, overhaul, and new construction tasks for the whole system. W-class cars were built to replace cable trams for the cable conversions, and subsequently W1 and W2 types were built at the workshops.

A distinctive workplace culture grew up around the workshops, evident in the oral traditions and characters of the workshops, such as Norm Cross, who may have been the inspiration for the central character in the Nadia Tass film, Malcolm.

The Tudor style “Melbourne Room” which provided a ballroom, theatre, concert and lecture hall for tram events, still features the gaily decorated stage that hosted 3DB's Lunchtime Funtime with Bill Collins.

In the 1990s, part of the works was leased to A Goninan & Co to refurbish Z1 and Z2 class trams as well as fit out light rail vehicles for the Hong Kong Light Rail system.

In 2014, a project commenced to revitalise the workshop. The heavy maintenance facility was reconfigured, a new servicing facility for the E-class trams built and seven kilometres of track relaid. It was officially reopened in 17 April 2016 as New Preston Depot, and replaced the East Preston depot.

== Description ==
When built, the site comprised a group of five large brick industrial buildings for the manufacture and maintenance of an increasing electric tram fleet. The principal buildings housed a foundry or metalworking shop, a mechanical/electrical shop, a lifting/body shop, a paint shop, and a central store. Two electric traversers enabled trams to be moved between the mechanical, body and paint shops, and auxiliary buildings comprised a two-storey office, staff amenity hall, and three timber stores. An electrical substation, to supply DC electricity for the East and West Preston tramways, was constructed in the south east corner of the workshop compound in 1932.

=== Rolling stock ===
As of May 2024, the depot has an allocation of 72 trams: 48 E1-Class and 24 E2-Class.

== Routes ==
The following routes are operated from Preston depot:

- : West Preston to Victoria Harbour Docklands
- : Bundoora RMIT to Waterfront City Docklands
- : East Brunswick to St Kilda Beach shared with Southbank depot

== See also ==
- Architecture of Melbourne
- List of places on the Victorian Heritage Register in the City of Darebin
- Timeline of trams in Melbourne
