= Carlton, Victoria =

Carlton
- Suburb
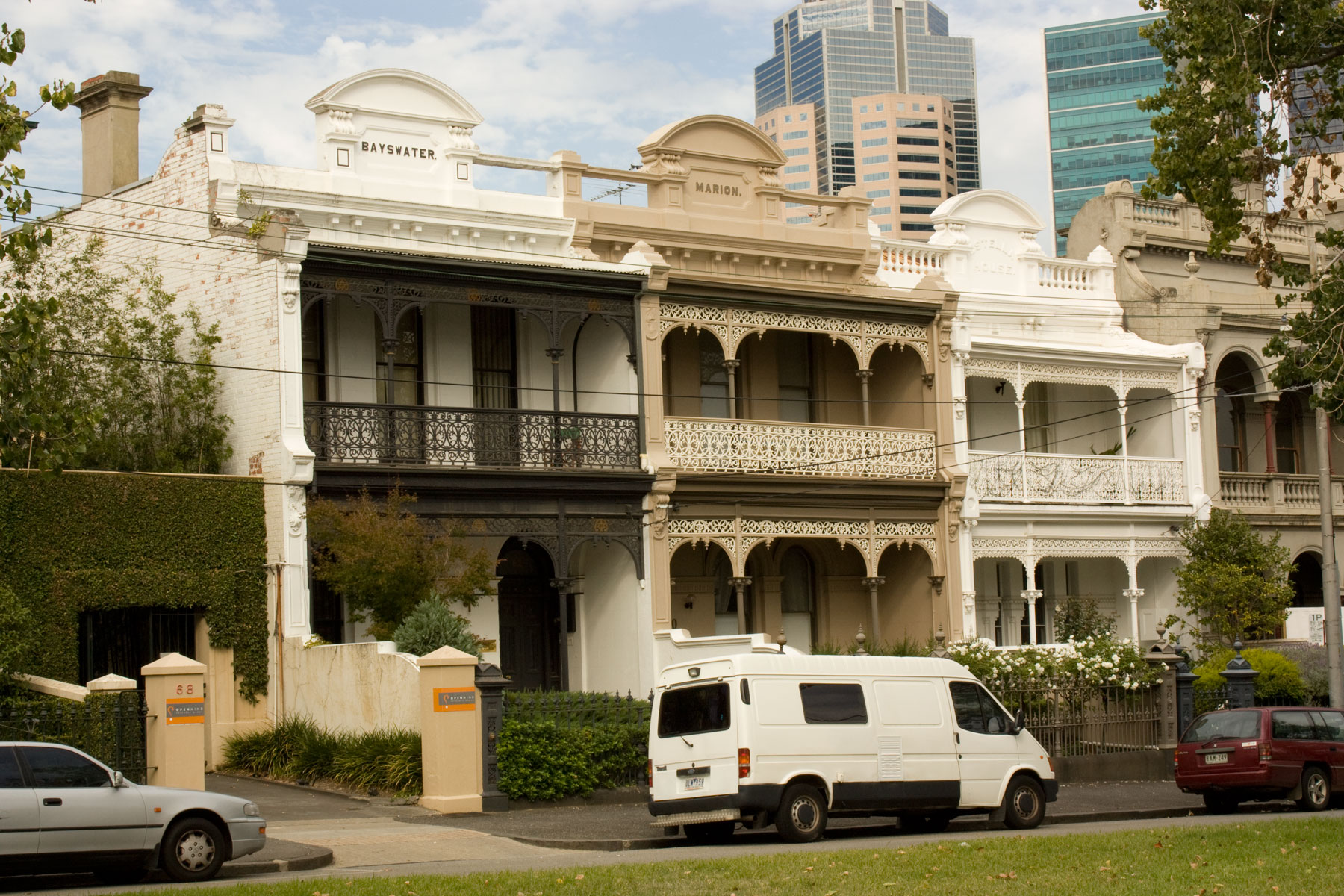
- Terraced houses on Drummond Street

- Interactive map of Carlton
- Coordinates: 37.8001°S 144.9671°E
- Country: Australia
- State: Victoria
- City: Melbourne
- LGA: City of Melbourne
- Location: 3 km (1.9 mi) from Melbourne
- Established: 1851

Government
  - State electorate: Melbourne
  - Federal division: Melbourne

Area
  - Total: 1.8 km^{2} (0.69 sq mi)
- Elevation: 45 m (148 ft)

Population
  - Total: 16,055 (SAL 2021)
- Postcode: 3053
Suburbs around Carlton
Parkville	Carlton North	Fitzroy North
North Melbourne	Carlton	Fitzroy
West Melbourne	Melbourne	East Melbourne

Carlton is an inner city suburb of Melbourne, Victoria, Australia, 3 kilometres north of the Melbourne central business district within the City of Melbourne local government area (LGA) and located on the traditional lands of the Wurrundjeri peoples. Carlton recorded a population of 16,055 at the 2021 census.

Immediately adjoining the CBD, Carlton is known nationwide for its Little Italy precinct centred on Lygon Street, for its preponderance of 19th-century Victorian architecture and its garden squares including the Carlton Gardens, the latter being the location of the Royal Exhibition Building, one of Australia's few man-made sites with World Heritage status.

Due to its proximity to the University of Melbourne, the CBD campus of RMIT University and the Fitzroy campus of Australian Catholic University, Carlton is also home to one of the highest concentrations of university students in Australia.

== History ==
Carlton was founded in 1851, at the beginning of the Victorian gold rush, with the Carlton Post Office opening on 19 October 1865. Prior to this, the lands were inhabited and owned by the Wurundjeri people of the Woiwurrung language group, who experienced major displacement from European colonisation. The suburb was named after Carlton House, the Westminster residence of King George IV.

In 1927, Squizzy Taylor, an Australian gangster, was wounded in a gunfight with rival, John "Snowy" Cutmore, at a house in Barkly Street, Carlton, and later died at St Vincent's Hospital.

By the 1930s, many homes in Carlton were seen as slums and leased by poor residents.

In the 1960s, the residents in some parts of the suburb were forced to move from their homes due to redevelopment by the Housing Commission of Victoria. Despite that, a number of areas in Carlton have survived intact. In the 1970s, Carlton was the site of three trade union green bans. One related to an abandoned block where a developer wanted a warehouse but local residents wanted a park, now the Hardy-Gallagher Reserve (named after Labor councillor Fred Hardy and union leader Norm Gallagher). Another allowed a vacant lot in Cardigan street to be turned into a park, and another saved a number of terraced houses from demolition.

The Carlton Magistrates' Court closed on 1 February 1985.

== Urban structure ==
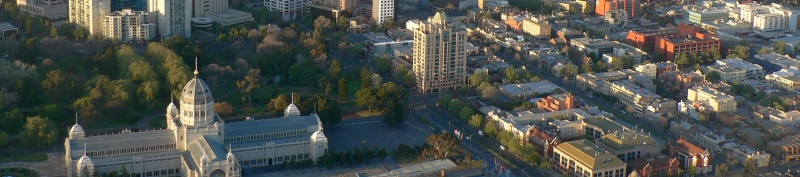
Aerial view looking south over Carlton. The Royal Exhibition Building and Carlton Gardens (left), Rathdowne Street (centre), Drummond Street (right) and Lygon Street (far right)

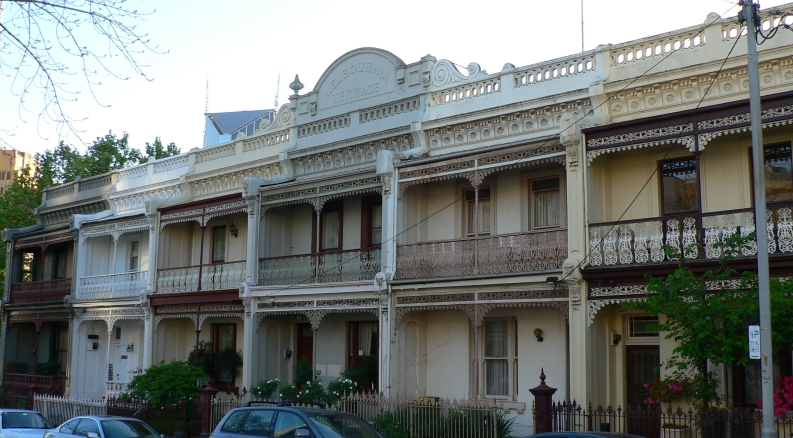
Double storey terraces on Drummond street, typical of much of Carlton's residential districts

=== Housing ===
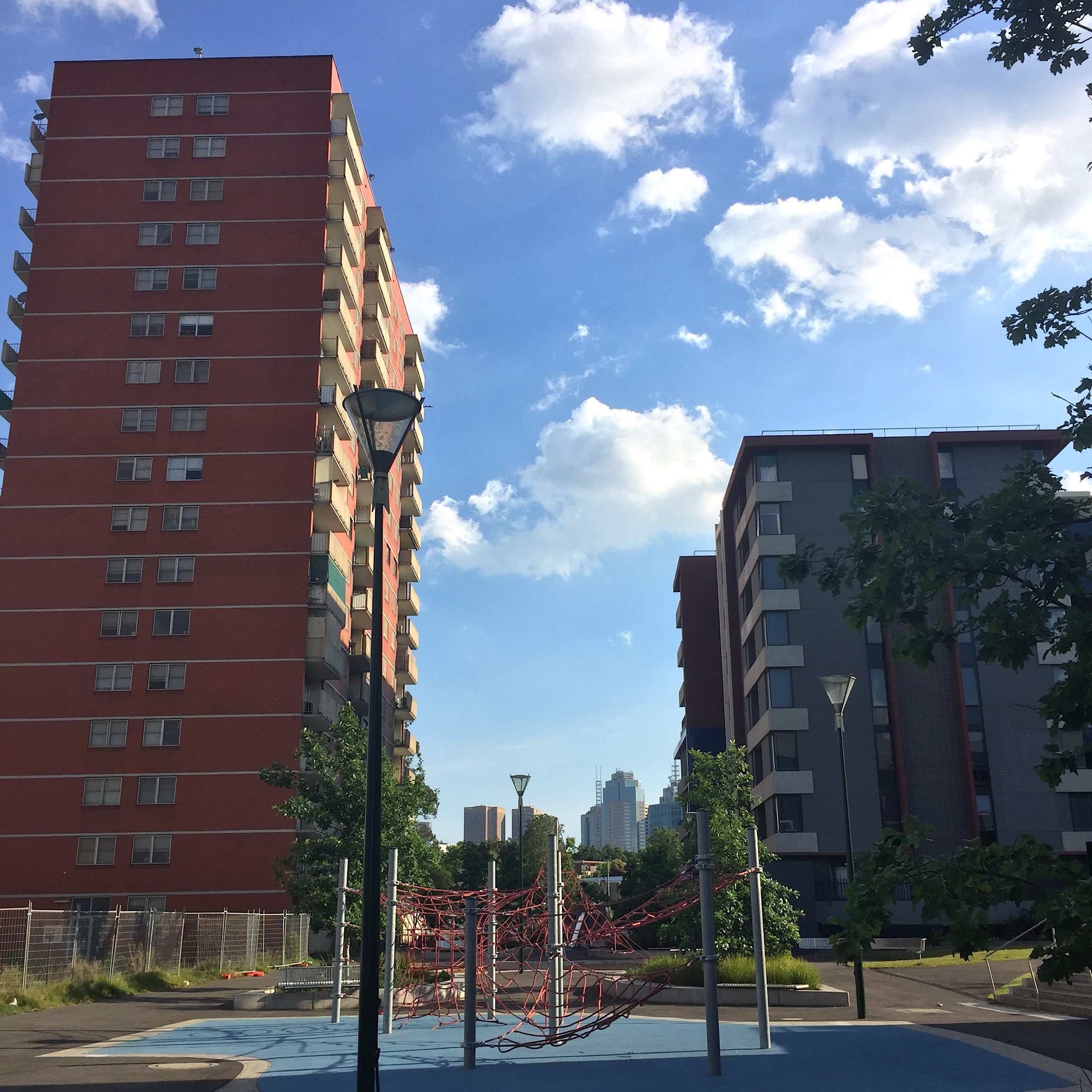
Housing commission in Carlton.

Carlton is characterized by medium- to high-density housing, with a mix of apartments and student accommodation, attached and semidetached terraces mostly from the Victorian era and mix-use buildings

In the 12-month period to January 2020, Carlton reported a median house price of A$620,000 for a two-bedroom unit.

As of 2021, apartments (80.7%) remain the most common form of housing. Carlton's apartments are low incomes, including crisis and student accommodation, with Housing Commission of Victoria towers and modern student apartment buildings. The two main housing commission estates are between Lygon and Rathdowne Streets, and between Nicholson and Canning Streets. These are configured as a mixture of 4 and 5-storey walk-up flats and 22-storey high-rise towers which are in the process of being redeveloped as mixed-tenure housing. 72.3% of Carlton's housing is rented, the vast majority of which is concentrated in these apartment towers. The development of new apartment buildings to accommodate international student market since the late 1990s has transformed the once low-rise skyline of Swanston Street, so that its predominant height is about 10–11 storeys. Some strata-titled apartments are clustered fronting the suburb's parks and gardens.

Semi-detached housing makes up most of the remaining occupied private dwellings (17.1%). Much of this type of housing is the suburb's remaining stock of terrace houses which proliferated in the Victorian era. Today these homes are highly sought after, attract high prices and have been the primary focus of gentrification. Many are contained within heritage overlays and have individual heritage listings. Some of the best examples of this style can be found on Drummond Street, a long wide boulevard flanked by grand homes, including Rosaville (no 46 built 1883), Drummond Terrace (nos 93-105 built 1890–91), Lothian Terrace (no 175-179 built 1865–69), Terraces at 313 & 315 (1889). Though many terraces in Carlton no longer function as residences and have either been converted for mixed-use or facaded as part of larger developments.

=== Public spaces ===
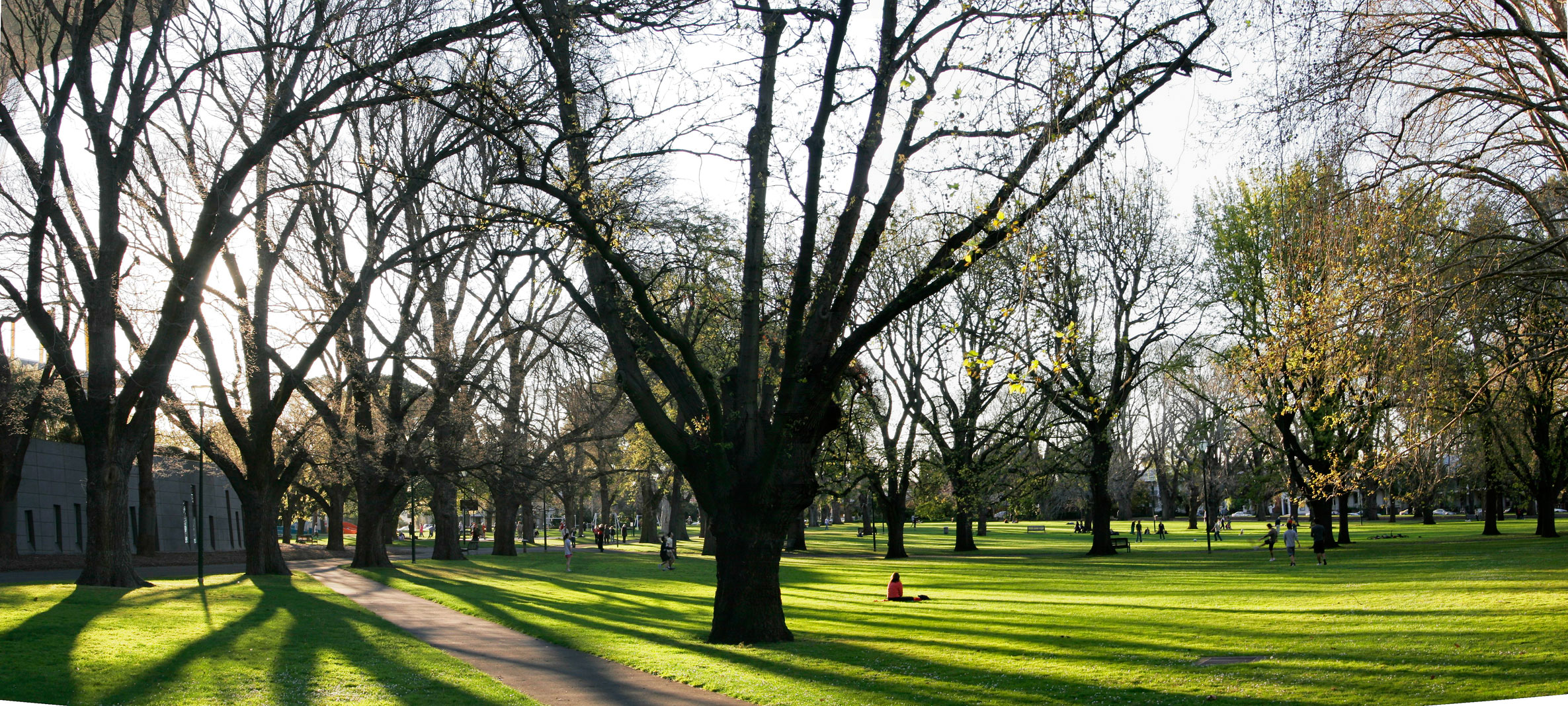
Carlton Gardens

Carlton's public spaces were planned in the Victorian era and notably are all garden squares. These are rectilinear green spaces surrounded by buildings, based on a model fashionable in Europe. There are five main garden squares within the suburb – Carlton Gardens, University Square, Lincoln Square, Argyle Place and MacArthur Place.

The largest of these squares is the 26 hectare Carlton Gardens, planned for the World Exhibition.

Lincoln Square on Swanston Street has a Bali Memorial, commemorating the victims of the 2002 Bali bombings officially opened on 12 October 2005, the third anniversary of the explosion that killed 202 innocent people, including 88 Australians.

The northern part of Argyle Square, adjacent to Lygon Street, has been redeveloped into an Italian style piazza, known as Piazza Italia, in a joint project between the City of Melbourne and its twin city, Milan. A giant sundial is the main feature of the piazza.

== Little Italy ==
Little Italy, Melbourne, also sometimes referred to as the "Italian Precinct" or simply "Lygon Street", is a "Little Italy" cultural precinct centred around Lygon Street in Carlton.

Lygon Street is home to a large concentration of Italian restaurants, and is the birthplace of Melbourne's "café culture".

== Culture ==
=== Arts ===
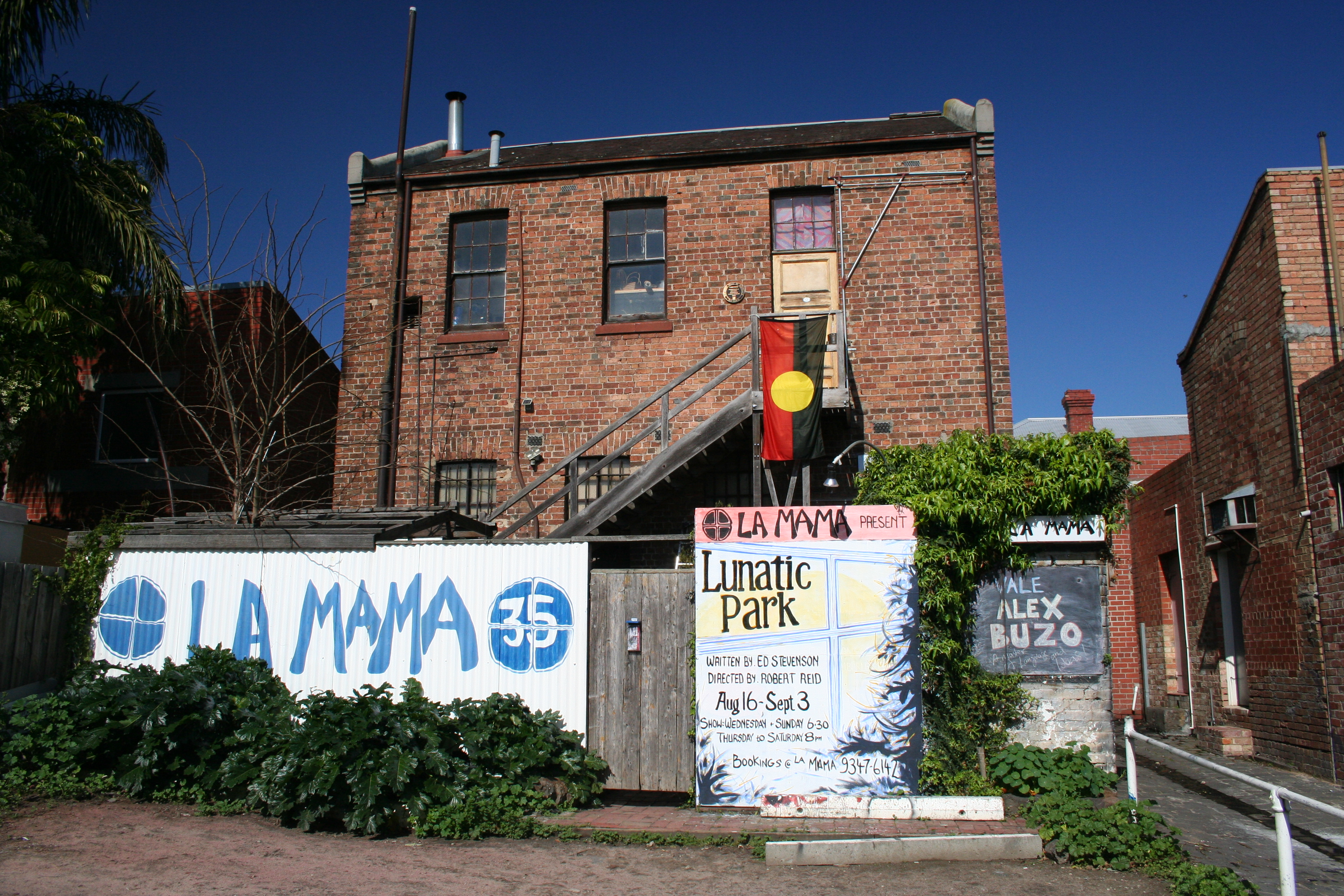
La Mama Theatre

The famous La Mama Theatre is located in Carlton. It is noted for its energy, which is typical of the early Australian theatre scene in the 1970s. Besides that, Cinema Nova on Lygon Street shows many Australian and international art-house films, while Readings Bookstore has been a hub for literary and musical connoisseurs since the 1970s.

Ray Lawler's seminal 1955 play Summer of the Seventeenth Doll is set in a Carlton terrace. The 1977 cult-classic novel Monkey Grip by Helen Garner is also set in Carlton and its surrounds.

=== Landmarks and heritage ===
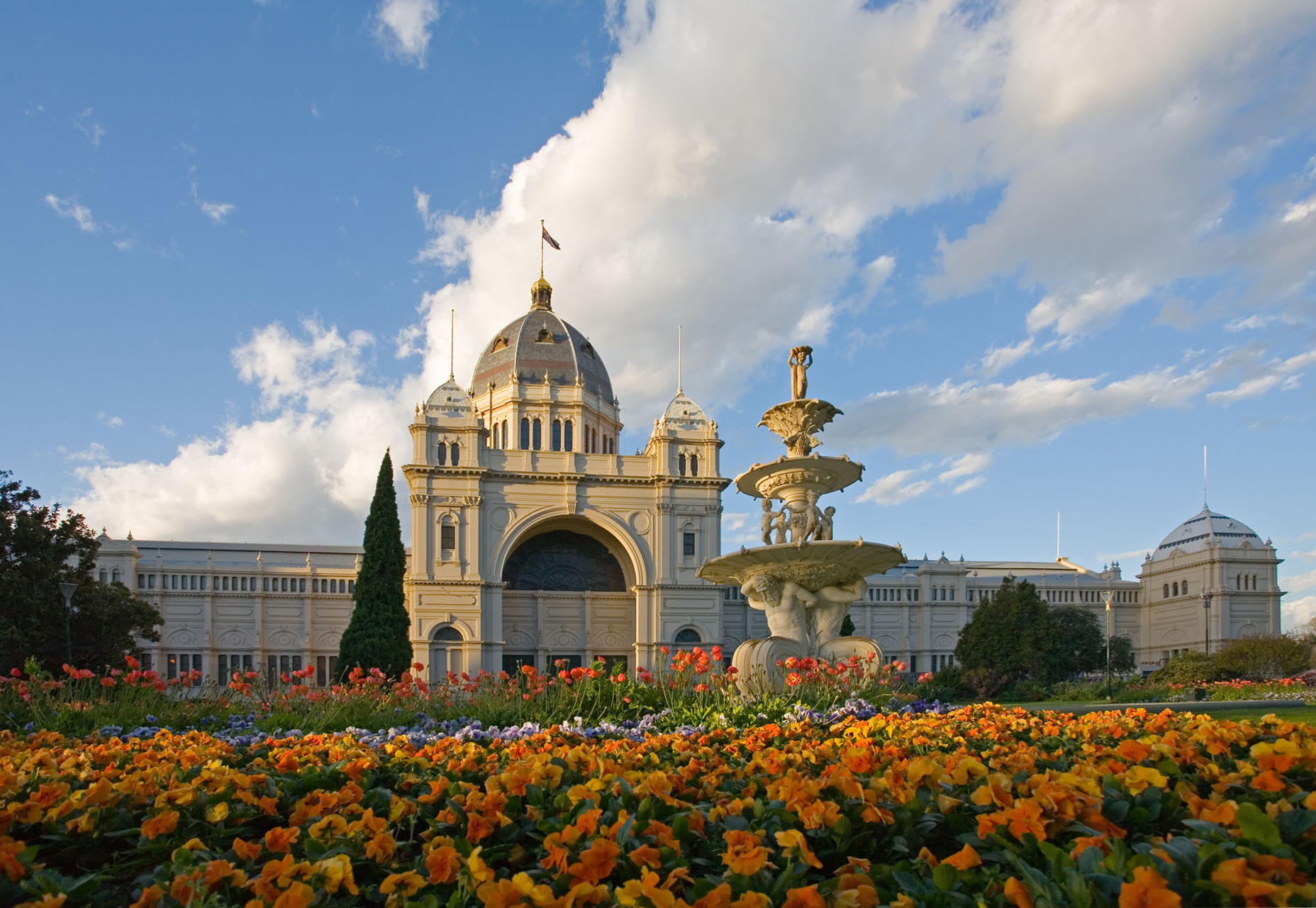
Royal Exhibition Building on Rathdowne Street

Carlton is home to some of Melbourne's most historically significant buildings such as Melbourne Trades Hall and the World Heritage Site of the Carlton Gardens, the Royal Exhibition Building and the ruins of the old Carlton Brewery, a collection of buildings constructed between 1864 and 1927, all listed on the Victorian Heritage Register. The Carlton Gardens are also home to the Melbourne Museum.

Carlton has many 19th century public buildings. The Carlton Club, which was built in 1889 by Inskip & Robertson, is notable for its decorative Australian native kangaroo gargoyles and polychrome Florentine arches. The Carlton Post Office and Police Station are both fine Renaissance Revival styled buildings. The Carlton Court House on Drummond Street was designed in the Gothic style by G.B.H Austin and constructed between 1888 and 1889. The Lygon Buildings on Lygon Street were built in 1888 in the Mannerist style. Carlton Gardens Primary School, on Rathdowne Street, opened in 1884. The Police Station (no330 built 1878), Court House (no345-355 built 1887–88) and Medley Hall (no48 built 1892–93) are other notable heritage buildings.

=== Sport ===
Carlton is the home of the Carlton Football Club, an Australian rules football club that competes in the Australian Football League. Known commonly as the "Bluebaggers" or "Blues", the club are headquartered and train at their former home ground, the Princes Park Football Ground, in nearby Carlton North. The club splits its home games between the Melbourne Cricket Ground and Marvel Stadium.

Lygon Street, Grattan Street and Queensberry Street were part of the route of the marathon in the 2006 Commonwealth Games, which was hosted in Melbourne. Lygon and Cardigan Streets are part of the seventh course of the annual cycling tour, Jayco Herald Sun Tour.

== Economy and commerce ==
Lygon Street, which runs through the heart of Carlton, is a centre of Italian culture and cuisine. It is popular among Melburnians and foreigners alike for its numerous restaurants, especially Italian restaurants. Lygon Street is also home to coffee roasters, brunch cafes, pubs, rooftop bars, specialist gelaterias, and several continental cake cafes.

Although Lygon Street is most renowned for its cafes and restaurants, it is also home to some notable retail stores including Readings bookstore and Cinema Nova.

== Demographics ==
Historical population
Year	Pop.	±%
2001	9,966	—
2006	12,050	+20.9%
2011	13,509	+12.1%
2016	18,535	+37.2%
2021	16,055	−13.4%

In the 2021 census, there were 16,055 people in Carlton.

39.1% of people were born in Australia. The next most common countries of birth were China (14.0%), India (5.0%), Malaysia (3.9%), England (2.1%) and Vietnam (2.0%)

46.2% of people only spoke English at home. Other top languages spoken at home included Mandarin (16.6%), Cantonese (3.3%), Vietnamese (2.3%), Somali (2.0%) and Spanish (1.9%)

The most common responses for religion was No Religion (51.6%), Catholic (11.4%), Islam (7.1%) and Buddhism (6.0%).

The area is noted for its diverse population that has been the home in earlier days of Jewish and Italian immigrants. A large number of low-income residents live in the substantial public housing estates that were built during the 1960s.

Carlton also has a sizable tertiary student population, both local and international, due to its proximity to the University of Melbourne and RMIT University. 72.7% of Carlton residents were attending a tertiary educational institution.

== Politics ==
Carlton falls within the federal electorate of Melbourne (currently held by Sarah Witty of the Australian Labor Party) and the state electorate of Melbourne (currently held by Ellen Sandell of the Greens).

A traditional working-class suburb, it traditionally saw a high vote for the ALP. However, like many other inner-city suburbs undergoing a process of gentrification, the Greens have been gaining an increasing share of the vote.

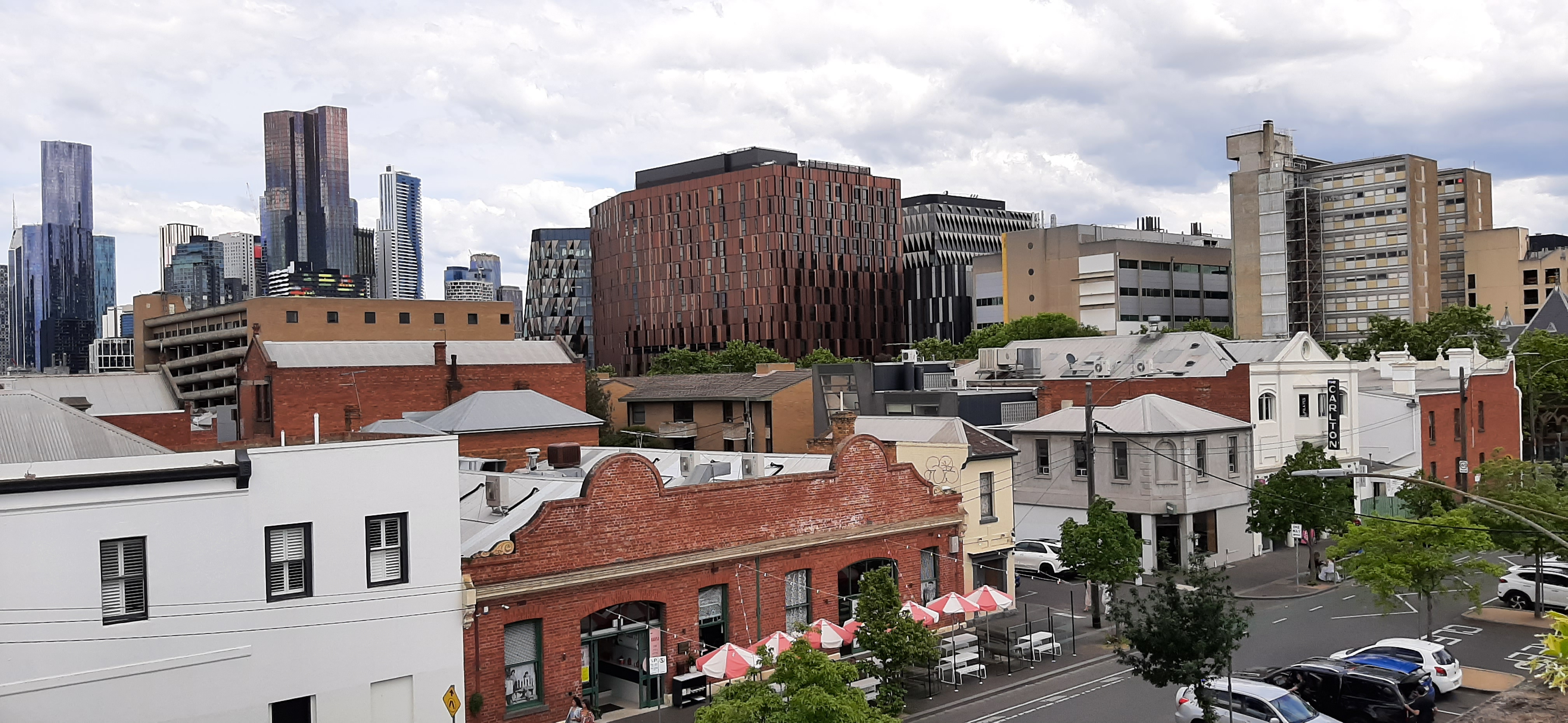
Faraday Street Carlton, with University of Melbourne buildings in the distance on the right

== Education ==
Due to Carlton's close proximity to the Parkville campus of the University of Melbourne, many university-owned buildings can be found around Carlton, as a result of the university's expansion through the years. This includes the University Square redevelopment, where the state-of-the-art Law and ICT buildings and a new underground carpark are located. However, the university's continued expansion into Carlton is opposed by some residents. Two of the university's residential colleges are located in Carlton; Medley Hall is located on Drummond Street, while Graduate House is on Leicester Street. Graduate House is a residential college for graduate students only and does not admit any undergraduate students.

Melbourne Business School, Melbourne Law School and part of RMIT University's City Campus are also located in Carlton.

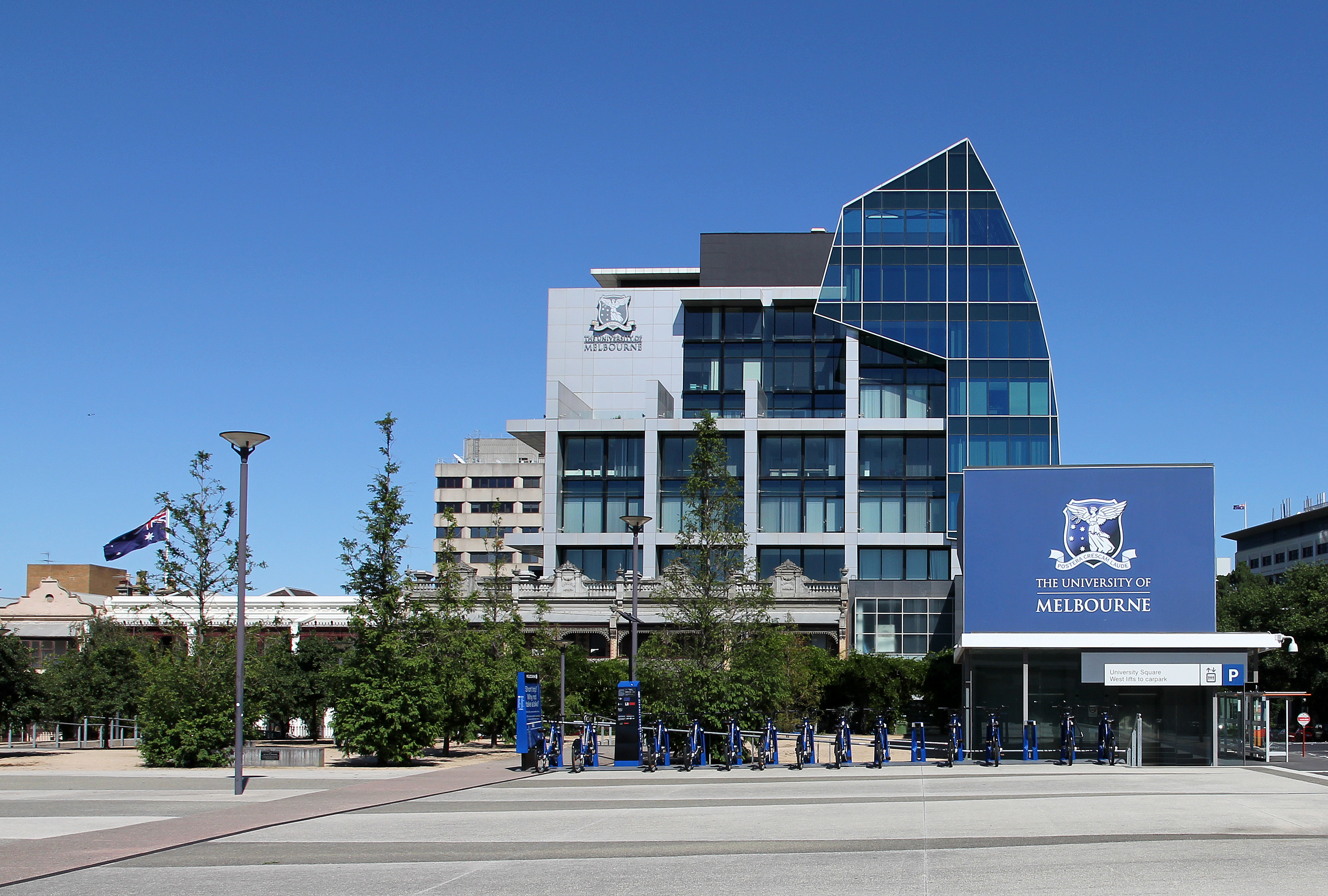
Alan Gilbert Building, University of Melbourne at University Square in Carlton

Victoria and Tasmania's Catholic seminary, Corpus Christi College, is located on Drummond Street. The college accommodates forty seminarians who are studying to become priests.

Primary education is provided by two schools; Carlton Gardens Primary School and Carlton Primary School. CGPS was founded in 1884 and is one of Melbourne's oldest schools and the closest to the Melbourne CBD.

The Melbourne University Regiment (MUR) is based in Grattan Street, Carlton. MUR serves to train potential officers in the Australian Army Reserve. MUR was founded in 1884 as D company, 4th Battalion of the Victorian Rifles, and changed to its current name and role in 1948. Famous alumni include Sir John Monash, Sir Robert Menzies, Sir Ninian Stephen, Barry Humphries, and Andrew Peacock.

== Health ==
Carlton is well serviced by the health sector. The Royal Women's Hospital and the new Royal Dental Hospital provide high quality health care. It is also a centre of biomedical research. The Cancer Research Institute and the Australian College of Optometry all have their premises in Carlton. Carlton is the home of NETS (Victoria) which provides emergency transport of sick newborns between hospitals throughout Victoria and from Tasmania. It was also the home of Cancer Council Victoria for many years before it moved to St Kilda Road.

== Places of worship ==
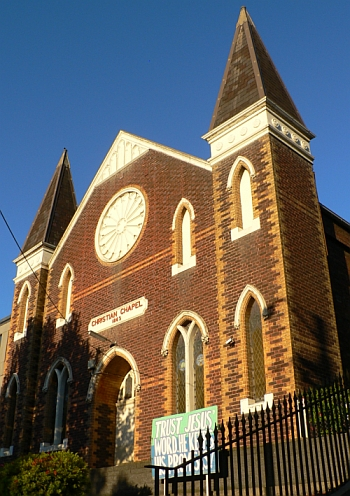
Lygon Street Church of Christ built 1865

There are a number of churches in Carlton, which serve the spiritual needs of Carlton residents. St Jude's Church, on Lygon Street, is one of the most active and well attended Anglican churches in the Greater Melbourne area.

Other churches in the area include the bluestone Church of All Nations (a Uniting Church) in Palmerston Street dating from 1860, a Romanian Orthodox Church on Queensberry Street, a Salvation Army Church, the Sacred Heart Catholic Church, Chinese Church of Christ and the Christian Chapel of the Church of Christ, built in 1865.

The Catholic seminary is located on the site of St George's Catholic Church, Carlton's oldest surviving building, dating from 1855. The Albanian Mosque, Melbourne's oldest mosque is also located on Drummond Street in neighbouring Carlton North.

== Transport ==
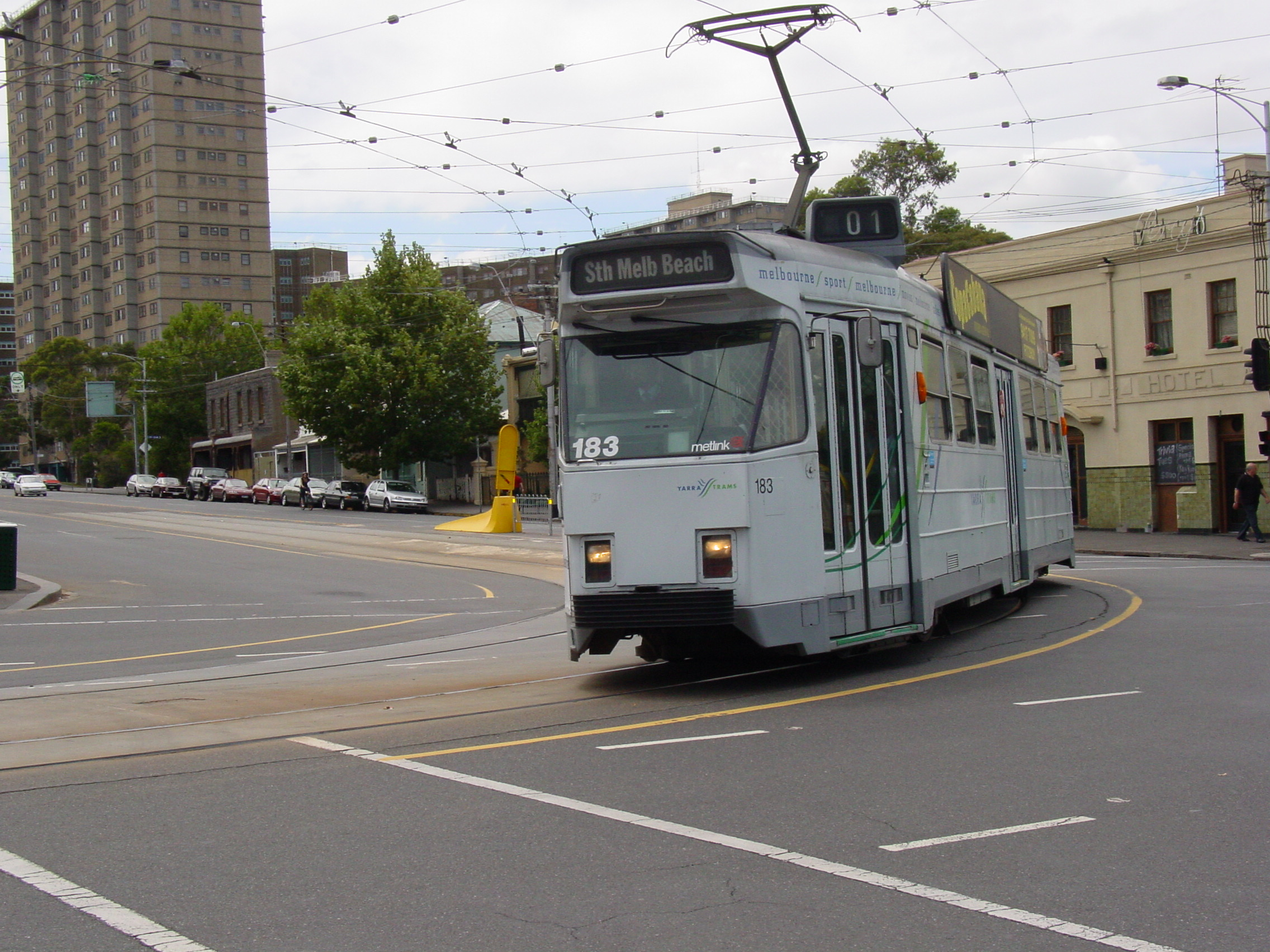
Z3 tram near the corner of Elgin and Lygon Streets

Carlton is served by many of Melbourne's tram routes, running along Swanston Street and terminating at Melbourne University. Routes 1 and 6 continue through to Carlton North and beyond via Lygon Street.

Buses serve Carlton via Lygon, Elgin, and Rathdowne Streets. There are currently no trains to Carlton, with the closest station being Melbourne Central. There were talks and proposals of extending the City Loop to service Carlton, but no concrete plans have been proposed.

Rod Eddington's East West Link Needs Assessment does mention however, that there will be subway(s) in Carlton, as a part of the proposed 17 km Metro Tunnel.

== Notable people ==
- Troye Sivan (1995-), musician
- Sir Carleton Kemp Allen (1887–1966), scholar
- Sir Thomas Malcolm Ritchie (1894–1971), electrical engineer and Liberal Party president
- Harry Stein (1919–1994), communist and jazz enthusiast
- Kalev Vann (1956–2011), Australian rules footballer
- The Very Rev Alexander Yule (1830–1907), Moderator of Victoria in 1891 and of the Federal Assembly of Australia in 1901

== See also ==
- St Jude's Church, Carlton
