= Graduate House =

Graduate House can refer to:

- University of Toronto Graduate House
- Graduate House (University of Melbourne)
- Graduate House (Australian National University)
