= Carlton Olympic Stadium =

Proposed stadium in Carlton North, Victoria

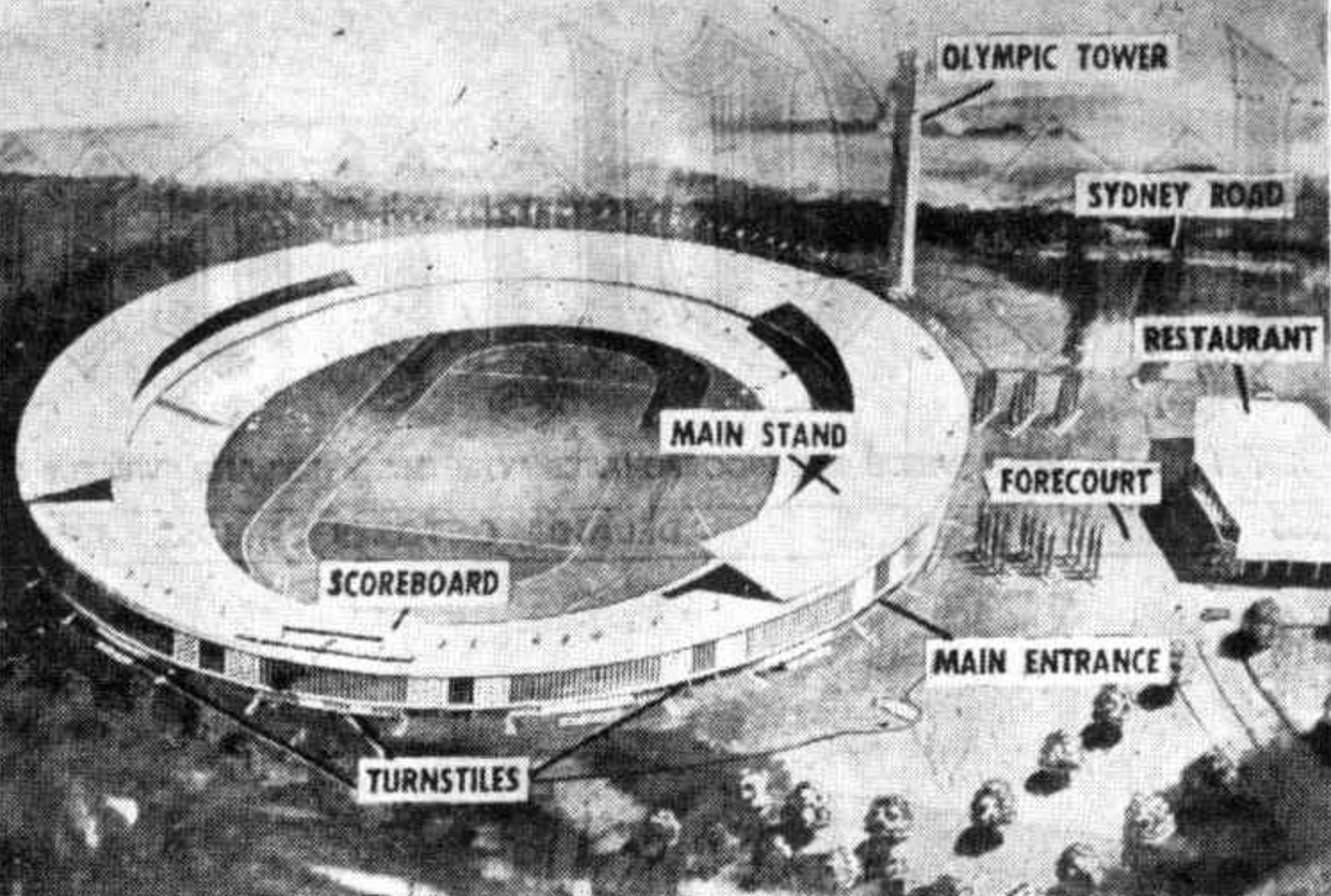
- Interactive map of Carlton Olympic Stadium
- Location: Princes Park, Carlton North
- Coordinates: 37°47′2″S 144°57′42″E
- Capacity: 125,000 (50,000 seated)

Construction
- Cost: £2 million (estimated in January 1953)
- Architect: Frank Heath

The Carlton Olympic Stadium was a proposed stadium located inside the Princes Park precinct in the Melbourne suburb of Carlton North. It was planned for the 1956 Summer Olympics to replace the existing Princes Park stadium; however, the Melbourne Cricket Ground (MCG) became the primary venue of the Games after the Victorian state government announced that it would not provide funding for a new stadium.

== History ==
Melbourne won the bid to host the 1956 Summer Olympics on 28 April 1949. By early 1952, Princes Park had emerged as the most likely primary venue for the Games, as the Royal Melbourne Showgrounds was deemed unsuitable and the conversion of the Melbourne Cricket Ground (MCG) was considered "engineeringly impracticable". The St Kilda Cricket Ground was also named as an option for another new stadium.

On 24 March 1952, the Melbourne City Council agreed that the federal government should cover 50% of the cost of making the Carlton stadium available as the primary venue, while the Victorian state government and the Melbourne City Council would cover 25% each.

The proposed stadium was to have a capacity of 125,000. As part of its construction, the Gardner Stand at Princes Park would be demolished. The Carlton Football Club also began preparations to move its home matches from Princes Park to Coburg City Oval in the months leading up to the Olympic Games' opening ceremony on 22 November 1956. At this time, the cost of construction was estimated to be £1.2 million.

In April 1952, The Argus reported that Victorian Football League (VFL) finals matches "may be played" at Carlton Olympic Stadium, with the VFL also considering moving its administrative offices to the new stadium after 1956.

Victorian premier John Cain opposed the construction of a new stadium, believing that the cost was too expensive. On 14 January 1953 (one day before construction was scheduled to begin), he ordered work on the stadium to stop, saying he was "extremely worried about Victoria's financial position".

At a conference of the Olympics organising committee on 2 February 1953, all relevant parties – excluding Cain – supported the construction of the new stadium. However, after Cain declared that no state government funding would be made available if the Games were to be based in Princes Park, the committee agreed to make the MCG the primary venue.
