= Princes Park (stadium) =

Stadium in Melbourne, Australia

Princes Park Ikon Park

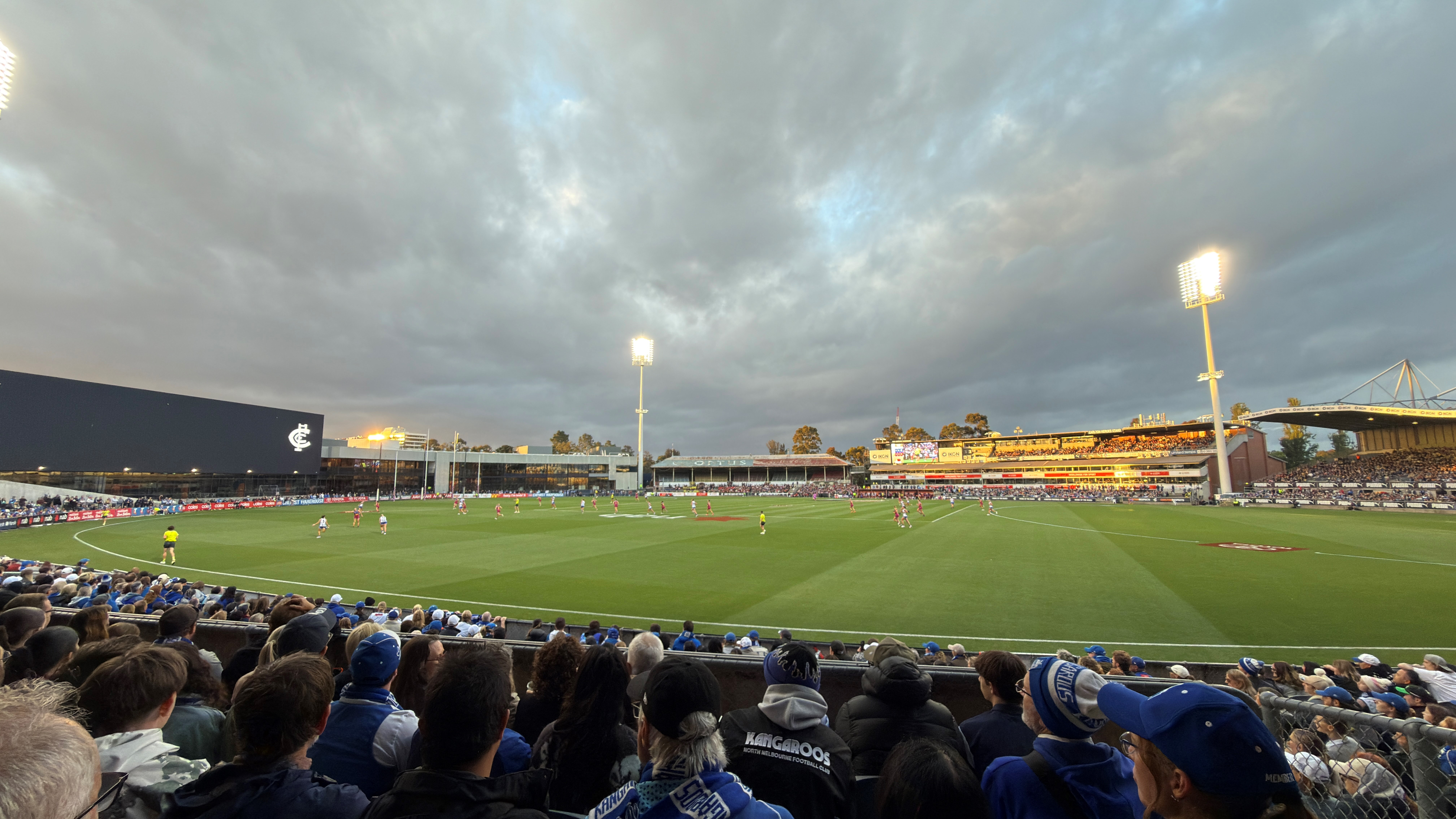
- Ikon Park pictured during the 2025 AFL Women's Grand Final
- Interactive map of Princes Park; Ikon Park
- Full name: Carlton Recreation Ground
- Former names: Princes Oval (1886–1897); Princes Park (1897–1994); Optus Oval (1994–2006); MC Labour Park (2007–2008); Visy Park (2009–2015); IKON Park (2015–present)
- Location: Princes Park, Carlton North, Victoria
- Coordinates: 37°47′2″S 144°57′42″E
- Owner: City of Melbourne
- Operator: Carlton Football Club
- Capacity: 13,000 (since 2023)
- Surface: Grass
- Record attendance: 62,986 (1945 VFL grand final)

Construction
- Groundbreaking: 1892
- Opened: 1897

Tenants
- Carlton Football Club Administration & Training (1897–present); VFL/AFL (1897–2005); AFLW (2017–present); VFLW (2018–present) Other Australian Football Tenants Northern Blues (VFL) (2012–2019); Fitzroy Football Club (1967–1969), (1987–1993) (VFL/AFL); Hawthorn Football Club (VFL/AFL) (1974–1991); Western Bulldogs (AFL) (1997–1999); Collingwood Reserves (VFL) (2008–2009); Western Bulldogs (AFLW) (2022); Essendon Football Club (AFLW) (2022) Other Sporting Tenants Carlton Cricket Club (1897–2000); Carlton Soccer Club (1997–1999); Balmain Tigers (NSWRL) (1994); Melbourne Storm (Administration & Training) (2006–2010); Melbourne Rebels (Administration & Training) (2011–2015)

Princes Park (known under naming rights as Ikon Park) is an Australian rules football venue located inside the Princes Park precinct in the Melbourne suburb of Carlton North. Officially known as the Carlton Recreation Ground, it is a historic venue, having been Carlton Football Club's VFL/AFL home ground from 1897.

At its highest usage, the ground had a nominal capacity of 35,000, making it the third largest Australian rules football venue in Melbourne (after the Melbourne Cricket Ground and Docklands Stadium). It hosted three grand finals during World War II, with a record attendance of 62,986 at the 1945 VFL grand final between Carlton and South Melbourne.

After 2005, when the ground hosted its last Australian Football League (AFL) game, two stands were removed and replaced with an indoor training facility and administration building, reducing the capacity. The venue reached capacity (24,500) for the inaugural AFL Women's match between Carlton and Collingwood in 2017. Subsequent renovations and modernisation of the ground and surrounding precinct have reduced Ikon Park's capacity to approximately 13,000.

== History ==
The Carlton Football Club (CFC) had been playing in Princes Park as early as 1865. In the 1880s football and cricket were played on separate grounds and as early as 1885 the Carlton Cricket Club (CCC) which played elsewhere in Princes Park fought for exclusive access to it. In 1886, the CFC built its home ground, Princes Oval, specifically for football though it lacked facilities for spectators of other football club grounds. In response to the construction of the football ground, the Carlton Cricket Club which had a separate oval within the park lobbied the Minister of Lands to remove the football ground from the park.

The cricket club, unsuccessful in seeking to access the oval, began to look elsewhere for a permanent venue and the football ground was however retained in situ. However the dispute between the two clubs over occupancy of the park and the legitimacy of the football ground would continue for years. Permissive occupancy of Princes Park was granted to CFC and CCC simultaneously in 1889.

It was Carlton Football Club's home ground during the inaugural season of the VFL/AFL in 1897. The club went on to win 673 of its 962 VFL/AFL games at the venue. The Alderman Gardiner Stand was designed in 1903 and completed in stages between 1909 and 1913, as a mostly iron stand with original cast iron columns still in place. The Robert Heatley Stand was officially opened by Alderman Sir William Brunton on Saturday, 7 May 1932.

During World War II, Princes Park hosted three VFL grand finals – in 1942, 1943, and 1945. (The 1944 match was played at the Junction Oval.) The 1945 grand final, between Carlton and South Melbourne, attracted a record crowd of 62,986. Three weeks earlier, the semi-final between Carlton and North Melbourne had attracted 54,846 people. Those were the only two crowds of over 50,000 in the venue's history. The record home-and-away (i.e., non-finals) crowd was set in 1963, when 47,514 attended a match between Carlton and Geelong.

In 1952, Princes Park was originally selected to be the main stadium for the 1956 Melbourne Olympics, which would have resulted in a major redevelopment to accommodate 125,000 spectators. It was also expected that VFL finals would be transferred to the ground after the upgrade. However, in early 1953 after a change of government, the Olympic Organising Committee changed its decision, instead redeveloping the Melbourne Cricket Ground for the Olympics.

Princes Park was the venue for the second Ashes test of the 1992 Great Britain Lions tour, in which the visitors defeated Australia 33–10. In 1994, the Balmain Tigers played two New South Wales Rugby League premiership games at Princes Park. Work on the Legends Stand began in 1995 and was completed for opening on 25 April 1997. The roof, with its curved modern structure, ensured that the oval was now enclosed with a roof all the way around its circumference.

In 2005, it was decided to discontinue the use of the ground for AFL home and away games. A farewell AFL game was played at Princes Park on Saturday 21 May 2005. The game was contested between Carlton and Melbourne. It was the last of the suburban grounds in Melbourne to be used in the AFL. The result was an 18-point win to Melbourne. Also in the same year, the ground hosted matches from the Australian Football Multicultural Cup as well as finals for the 2005 Australian Football International Cup.

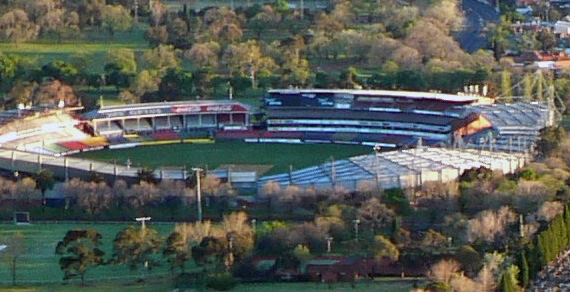
View from the air circa 2007

In January 2007, Graham Smorgon, then-president of the Carlton Football Club, announced a A$67 million redevelopment proposal involving the demolition of most of the stands, returning much of the ground to parkland and the establishment of club training facilities and community centre. On 7 June 2007 it was announced that the stadium would receive a A$15.7m redevelopment to provide the Carlton with elite training and administration facilities. The proposed redevelopment incorporated a gymnasium, weights and stretch areas, a 4-lane, 25-metre indoor heated pool, medical offices and rehabilitation/treatment spaces, football administration offices, lecture theatre and meeting rooms and additional changing room facilities.

The redevelopment of the $18 million training facility at Ikon Park was completed in 2010 on the collaboration of working closely with federal, state and local governments, along with the AFL, to deliver a world-class training and administration facility.

== Women's football and further upgrades ==
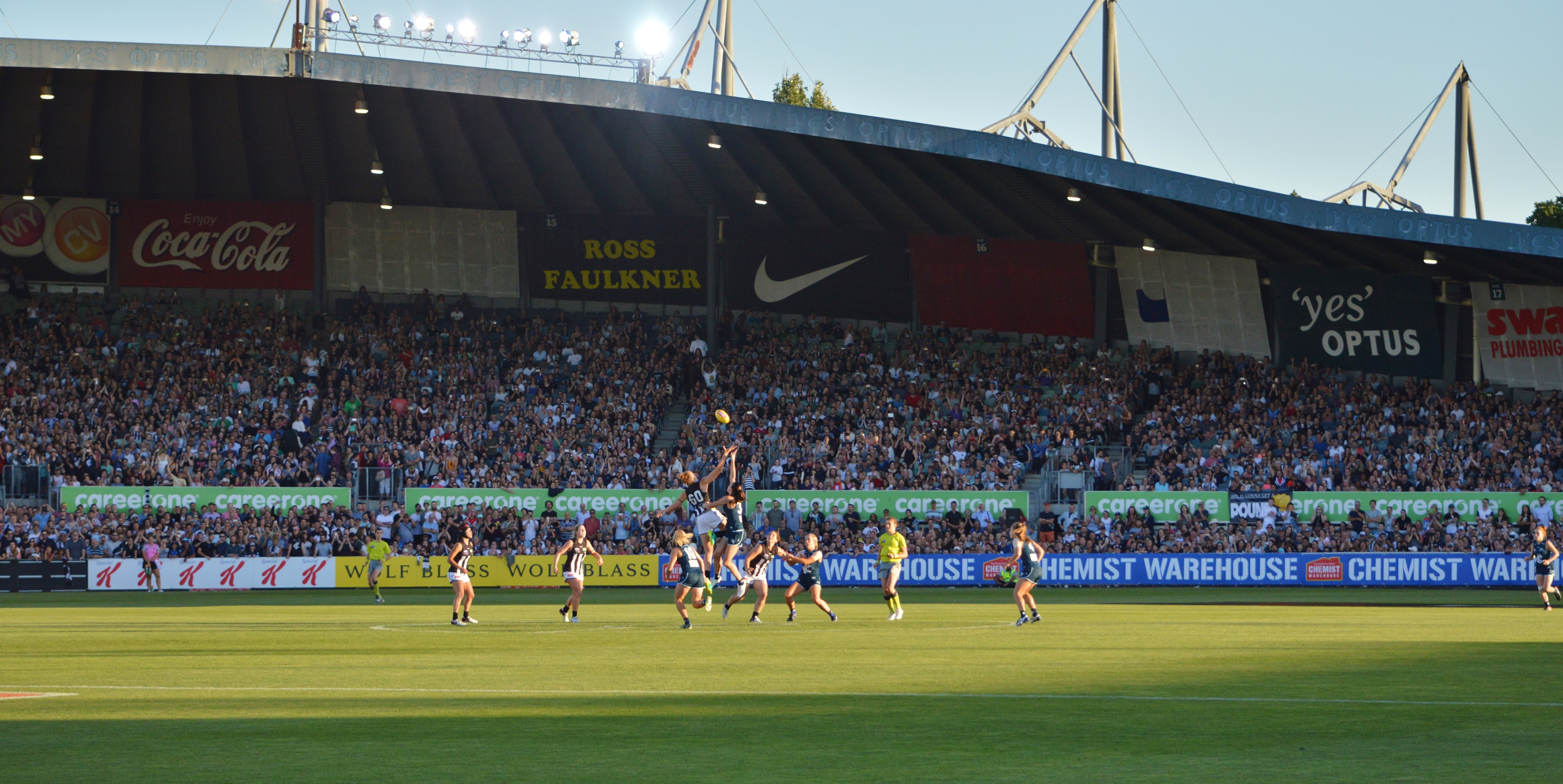
Players contest the first Ball-Up at the inaugural AFLW match in February 2017.

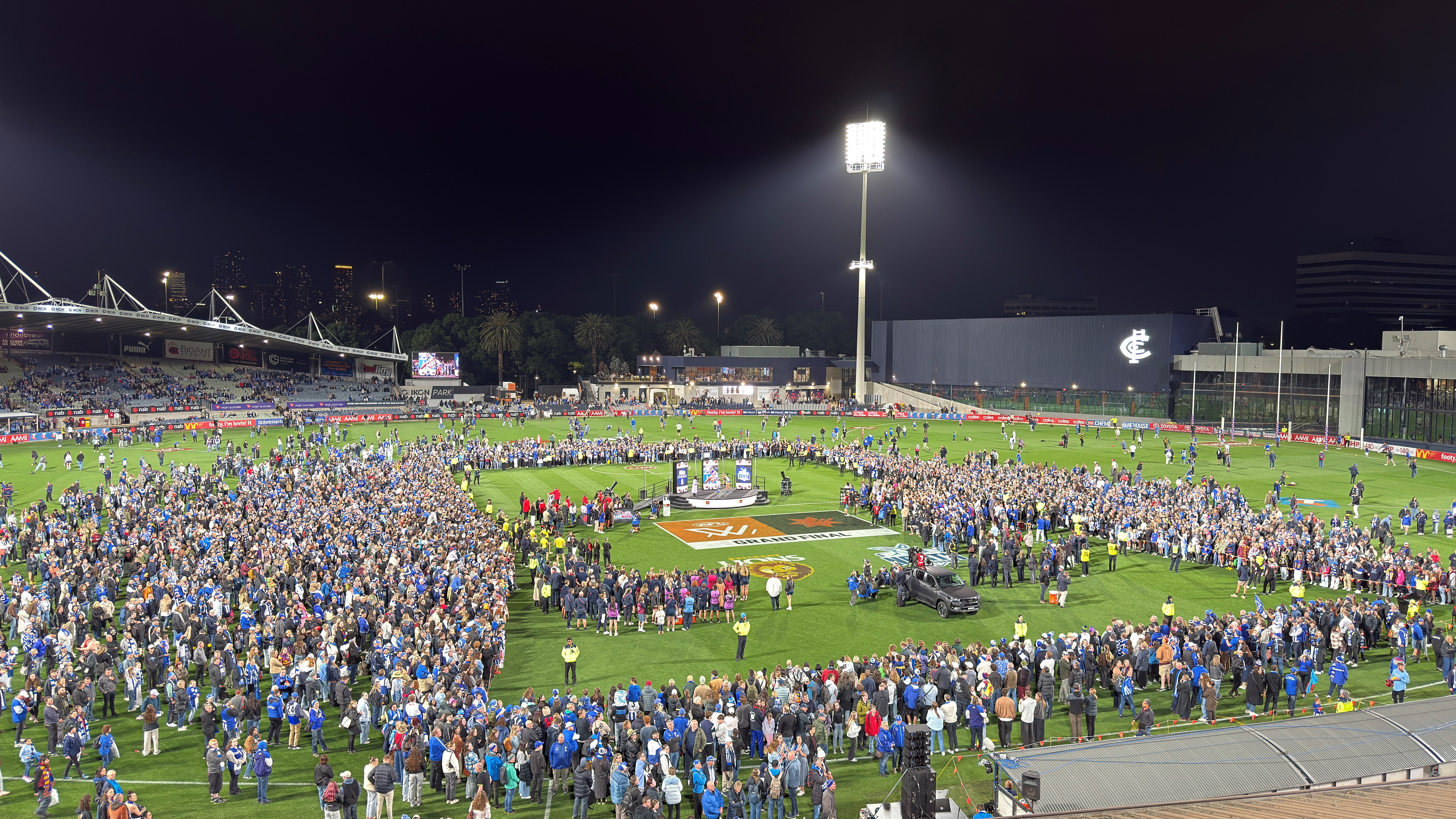
North Melbourne fans and players celebrate on the Princes Park field following the club's win in the 2025 AFLW Grand Final.

The inaugural match of the AFL Women's competition was held at the ground in February 2017. The game, featuring Carlton and Collingwood, attracted a capacity crowd of 24,568. The venue hosted the 2018 AFL Women's Grand Final, which saw the Western Bulldogs defeat Brisbane 27 to 21 in front of a crowd of 7,083. The success of the AFL Women's competition resulted in both state and federal governments allocating funding towards enhancement of the stadium's facilities, to enable it to become the home of women's football in Victoria.

The Victorian government committed $20 million in April 2018 to cater for the growth of women's football, which was followed the next year by $15 million from the federal government. The joint funding allows the venue to host a high performance women's training facility, with an upgraded oval, women's coaching education hub, sports injury prevention and research centre and allied health centre. Construction of the upgrades commenced in January 2021.

The training and administration building was refurbished, the Pratt Stand was demolished to make way for a match-day pavilion containing changing-rooms, high-performance areas, an indoor training field measuring 25m x 50m, broadcast-quality lighting, expanded retail facilities, a new café and function and events centre. The bulk of the redevelopment was completed in August 2022, with the match-day pavilion housing additional changerooms and function centre and event space completed the following month. The 2023 AFL Women's Grand Final was held at Ikon Park on 3 December 2023, which saw Brisbane defeat North Melbourne in front of a crowd of 12,616.

== Transport ==
Public transport to the venue is primarily by tram along Royal Parade directly adjoining the ground, or along Lygon Street 700 metres east of the ground. It is served by Royal Park railway station 1.1 kilometres to the west.

== Naming rights ==
The ground became known as Optus Oval in November 1993 due to a naming rights deal with telecommunications company Optus. In April 2006, it was announced that the naming rights for the stadium had once again been awarded, this time for a two-year term, during which the stadium was known as MC Labour Park. It was later re-named Visy Park. Since 2015, the ground has been commercially been known as Ikon Park.

== Tenants ==
=== Australian rules football ===
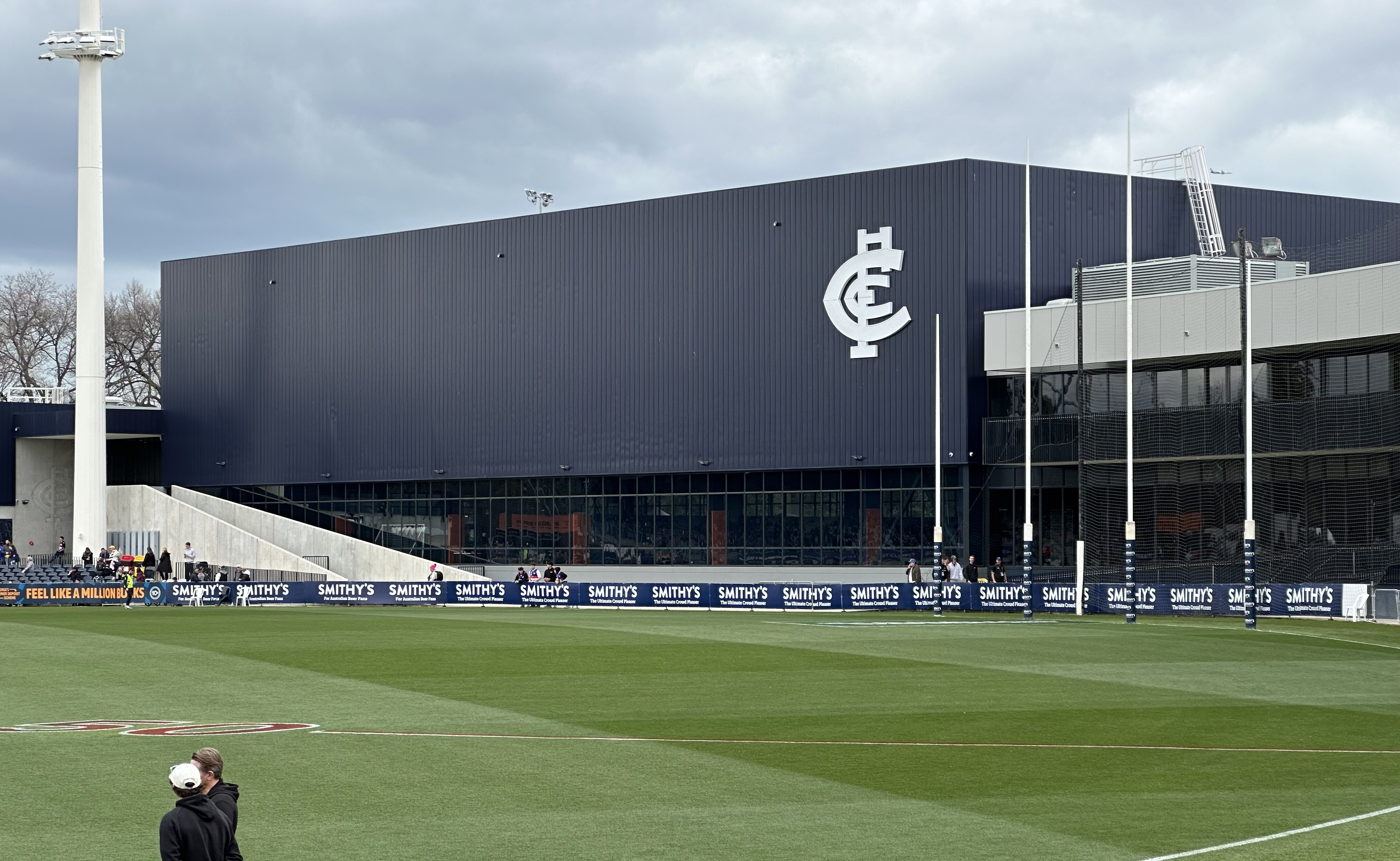
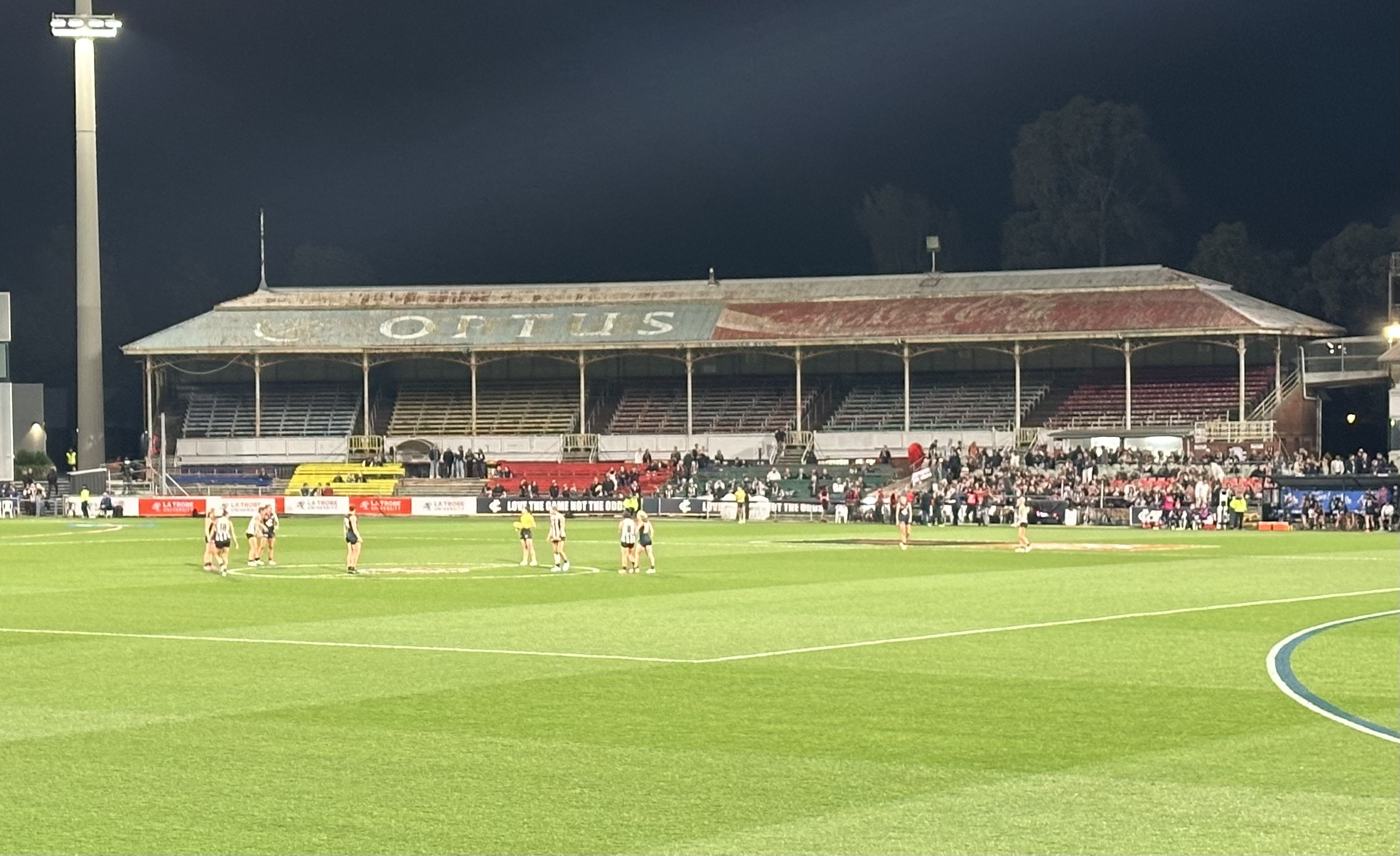
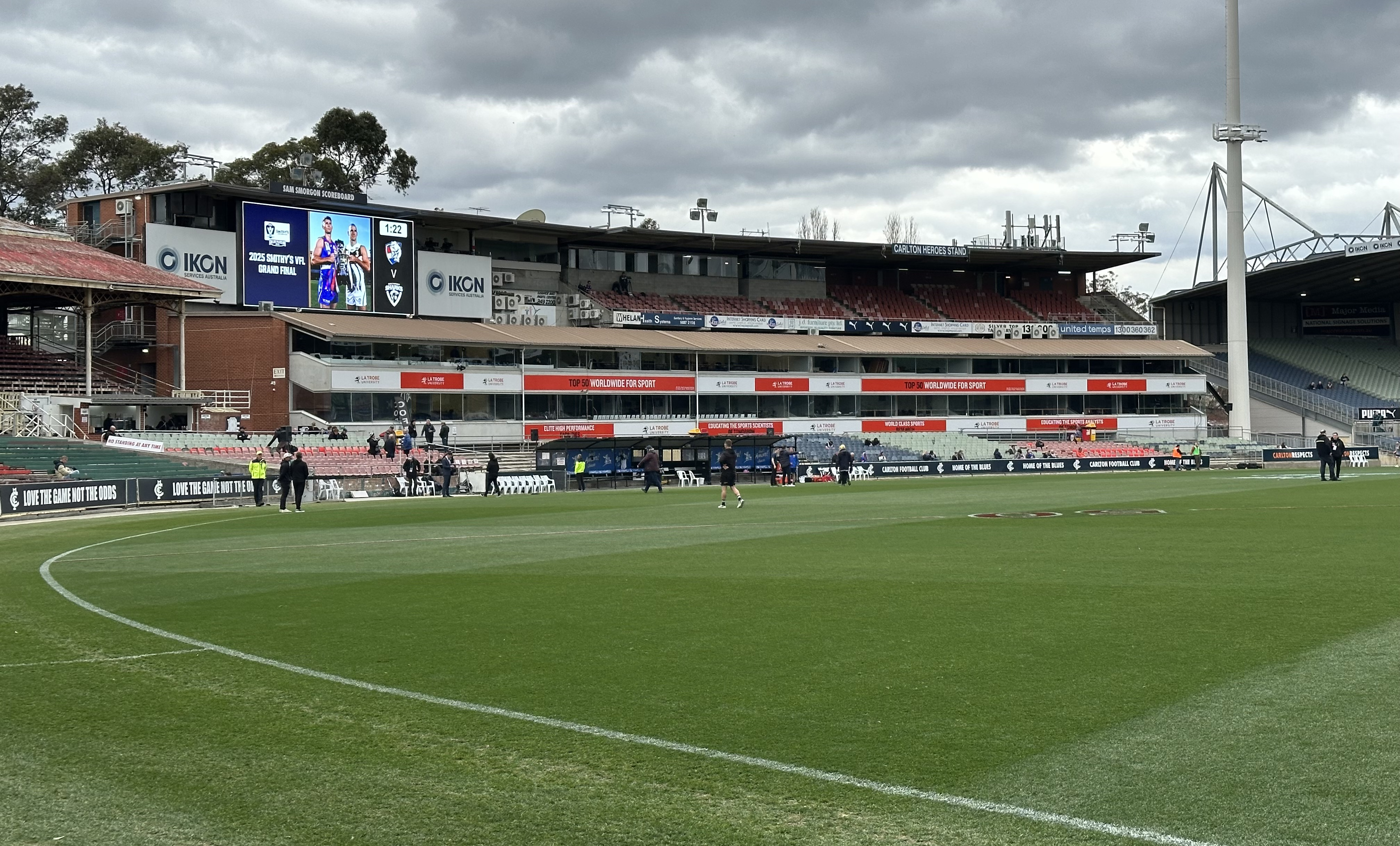
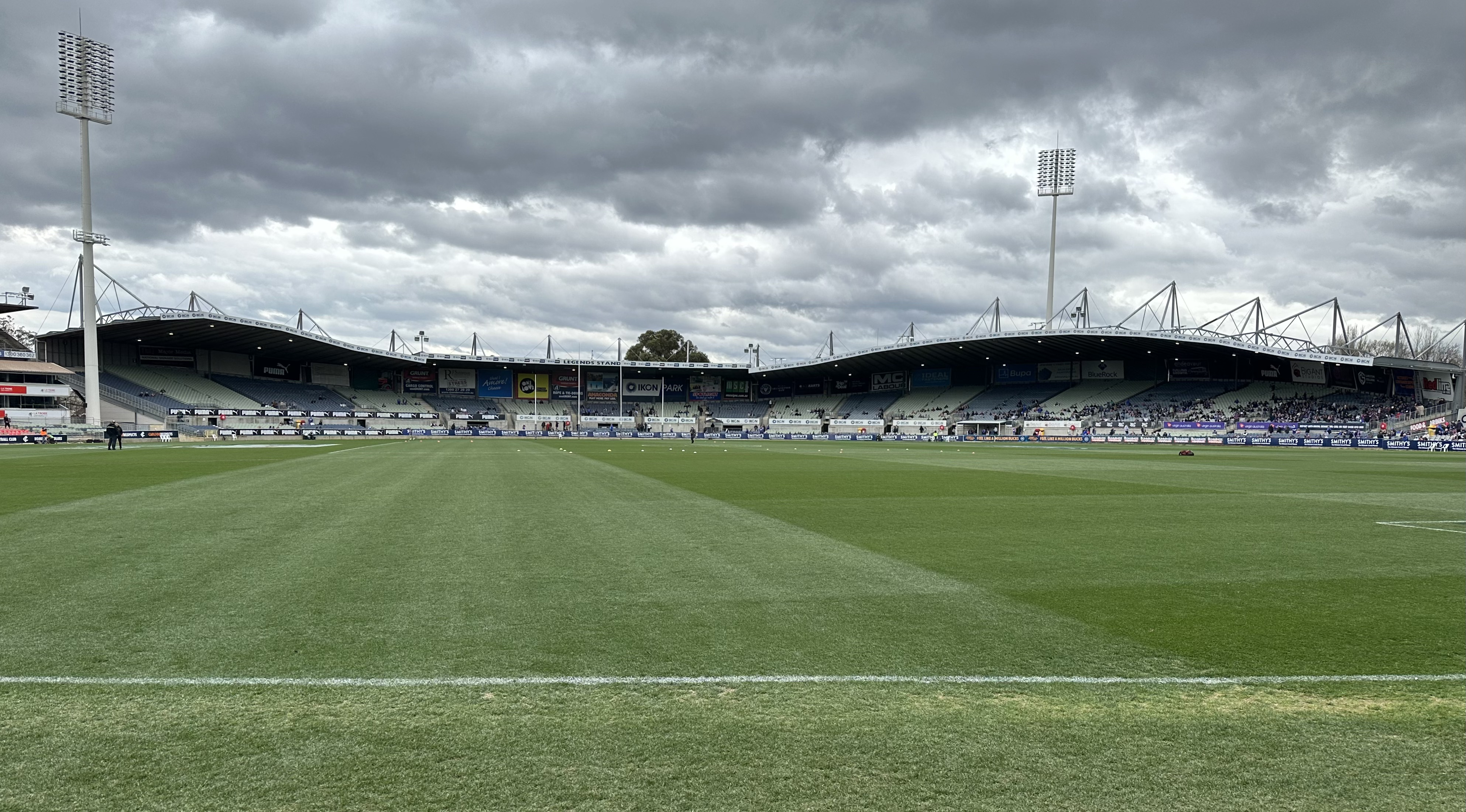
The Administration Building (top left), the Gardiner Stand (top right), the Carlton Heroes Stand (bottom left) and the Legends Stand (bottom right)

Tenants of the ground for VFL/AFL home matches have been:

- Carlton: the ground was Carlton's primary home ground continuously from 1897 until 2004, except in 2002 when it played only four games at the ground. A single farewell match was also played at the venue in 2005. The ground has been Carlton's training, social and administrative base continuously since 1897, remaining as such after the club stopped playing games there, and the club presently holds a 40-year lease on the venue which runs until 2035.
- South Melbourne: used the ground as its home during 1942 and 1943, owing to its usual home ground at Lake Oval being used for military purposes during World War II.
- Fitzroy: shared the ground with Carlton from 1967 until 1969 following its departure from the Brunswick Street Oval.
- Hawthorn: following its departure from Glenferrie Oval, Hawthorn used the ground as its primary home ground for sixteen years from 1974 until 1989. Then from 1990 until 1991, the club split its home games approximately evenly between Princes Park and Waverley Park, before moving permanently to Waverley Park in 1992.
- Fitzroy: after leaving Junction Oval and Victoria Park, Fitzroy spent a second stint at Princes Park and shared the ground with Carlton, using it as its primary home ground from 1987 until 1993, before moving to Western Oval seeking better rental terms.
- Western Bulldogs: after leaving Western Oval, used the ground as its primary home ground for three seasons from 1997 until 1999.
- Neutral venue: following Fitzroy's departure at the conclusion of 1993, an existing arrangement between Carlton and the AFL still required eighteen matches to be played there during the year; consequently, Fitzroy and the MCG's four co-tenants (Essendon, Richmond, Melbourne and North Melbourne) were each forced to play one or two home games at Optus Oval to make up the balance, including Fitzroy's last home game in the AFL. The practice ended in 1997 when the Western Bulldogs moved their home games to the venue. A similar arrangement occurred in 2002, when Carlton played only four games at the ground, forcing six neutral games to be staged at the ground to meet the new contractual minimum of nine. The unpopular venture was dropped at the end of the year, as all of the home teams in these neutral games lost money due to poor crowds and, in many cases, conflicting sponsorship deals.

The ground has hosted VFA/VFL grand finals on and off from 1990 to 2007 and again from 2019. Carlton's reserves team plays its VFL matches at the ground; and from 2012 until the dissolution of their affiliation in 2020, the Northern Blues, Carlton's VFL-affiliate, split their home games between Princes Park and Preston City Oval. From 2007 until 2010, the ground was the home ground of the Collingwood reserves, which was ironic considering that Collingwood and Carlton are bitter rivals in the AFL. Carlton's senior team has continued to play some pre-season and practice matches at the ground since it stopped playing premiership matches there.

Carlton's AFL Women's (AFLW) team plays its matches at the venue, as have some other clubs for specific matches.

=== Other sports ===
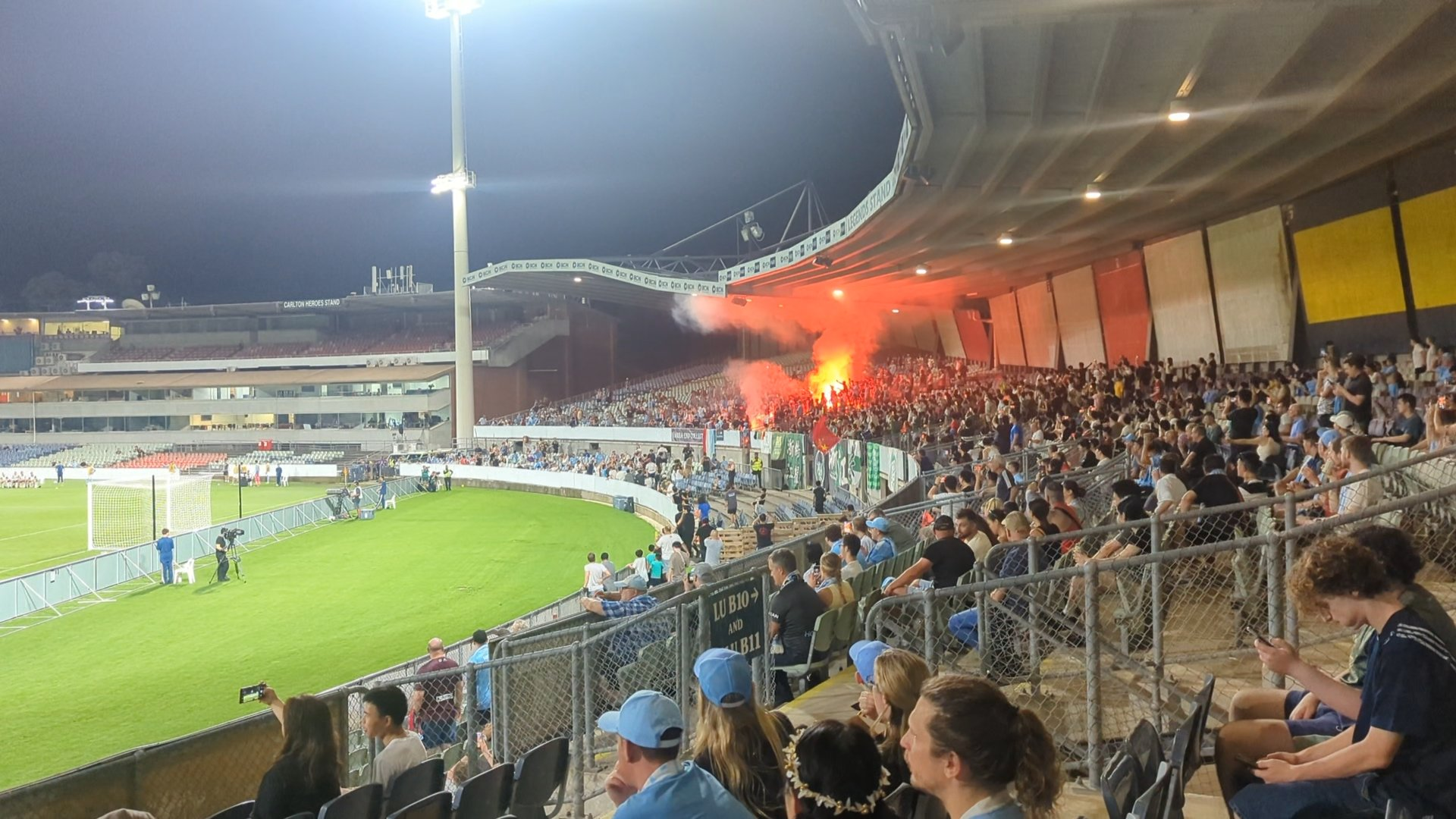
Melbourne City and Zhejiang FC fans during their AFC Champions League match in 2023.

The venue's most notable alternative use was as a cricket ground. The ground has hosted seven first-class cricket matches, including three Sheffield Shield games, and two List A matches. Until 2000, the ground was the home of the Carlton Cricket Club in the Victorian Premier/District Cricket competition; in 2000, the club moved to the No. 1 Oval in the wider Princes Park area to enable the football club unlimited access to the venue for year-round training.

The Balmain Tigers took two games away from their traditional home Leichhardt Oval to Princes Park in the 1994 Winfield Cup. The largest attendance Balmain got for a match was 14,762, when the Brisbane Broncos beat Balmain 36–14 in round 7 with Steve Renouf scoring four tries. From 2006 to 2010, the venue became the administrative headquarters and training venue for the Melbourne Storm rugby league club during the construction of a purpose-built rectangular stadium next to the then-current Melbourne Storm home ground, Olympic Park Stadium. The Storm hosted one preseason fixture at the venue in 2007.

The stadium was the home ground for now defunct association football club Carlton SC. In December 2023, A-League club Melbourne City hosted Chinese Super League club Zhejiang in the AFC Champions League due to scheduling conflicts at its usual home ground. Other sports, boxing and rugby, have also been played there. The ground was also host to a production of the opera Aida.
