= Little Italy, Melbourne =

Italian cultural precinct around Lygon Street, Melbourne, Australia

Coordinates: 37°47′59″S 144°58′1″E

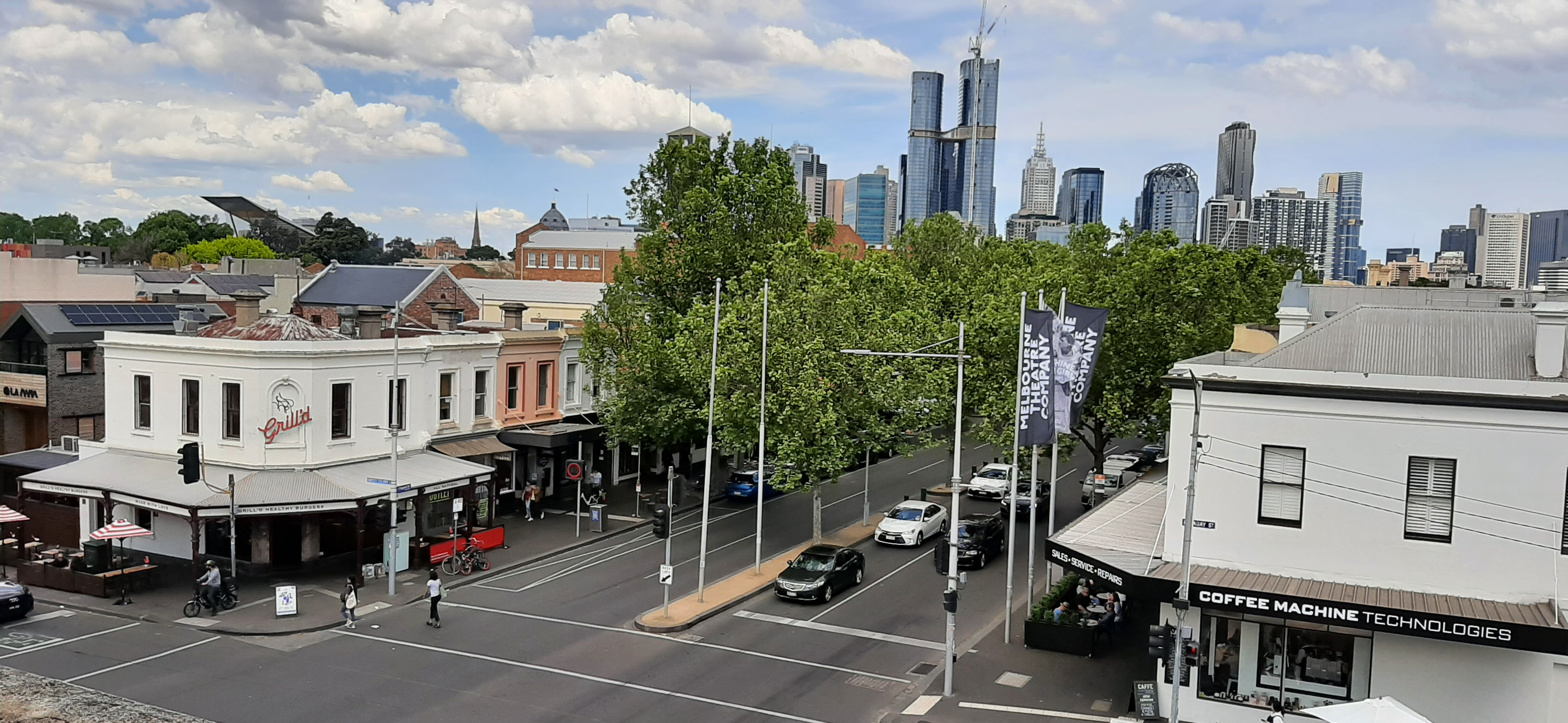
Lygon Street at the corner of Faraday Street, looking towards the Melbourne CBD

Little Italy in Victoria, Australia (also referred to as simply Lygon Street), is a Little Italy cultural precinct of the Italian community of Melbourne. It is situated along Lygon Street in the inner-Melbourne suburb of Carlton.

According to the 2006 Australian census, Victoria has the largest Italian-Australian population in Australia (around 200,000 statewide), with much of its inner-Melbourne population recorded in the suburbs of Carlton and nearby Brunswick.

Lygon Street is home to a large concentration of Italian restaurants, and is the birthplace of Melbourne's "cafe culture". Because of this, Melbourne was named as a sister city to Milan, Italy in 2004.

== Restaurants ==
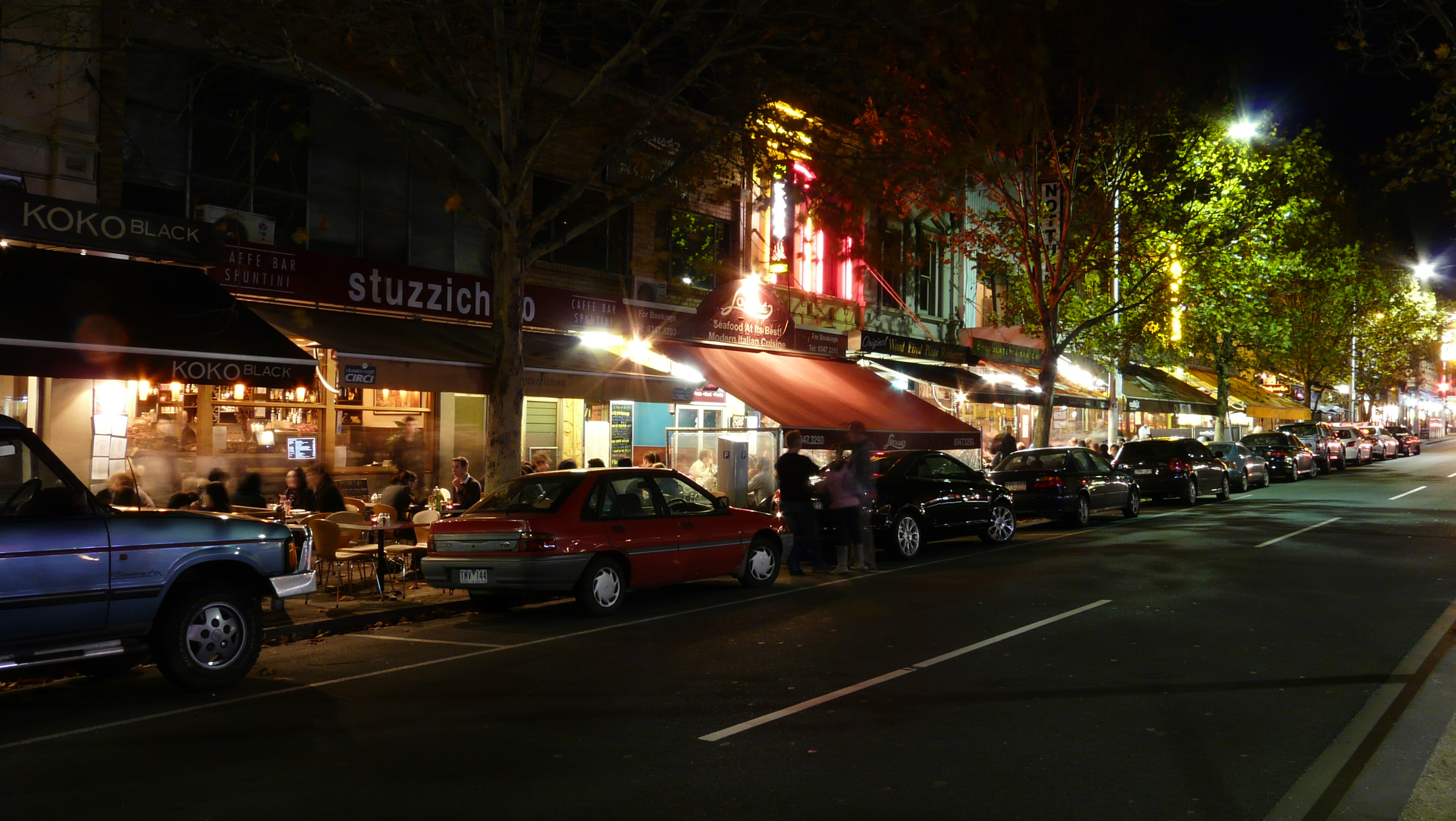
Italian restaurants on Lygon Street

The precinct's renowned Italian restaurant district occupies a number of blocks between Queensberry Street in the South, along Lygon Street, to Elgin Street in the north. Restaurants can also be found along the streets intersecting Lygon Street, towards the Carlton Gardens in the East and the University of Melbourne in the West. The Lygon Street Festa is an annual celebration of Italian culture and cuisine and is Melbourne's first and original street festival held in the district each November.

Towards the centre of the district, on the corner of Lygon Street and Argyle Place, there is a small Italian-inspired piazza named Piazza Italia - a joint-redevelopment by Melbourne and its sister city, Milan, in Italy.

During the annual Australian Grand Prix, the restaurant district is bathed in red and yellow banners in support of the Ferrari Formula One racing team. It was also a major site of Australian celebrations when Italy's national football team won the 1982 FIFA World Cup and 2006 FIFA World Cup.
