= Lygon Street =

Street in Melbourne, Victoria, Australia

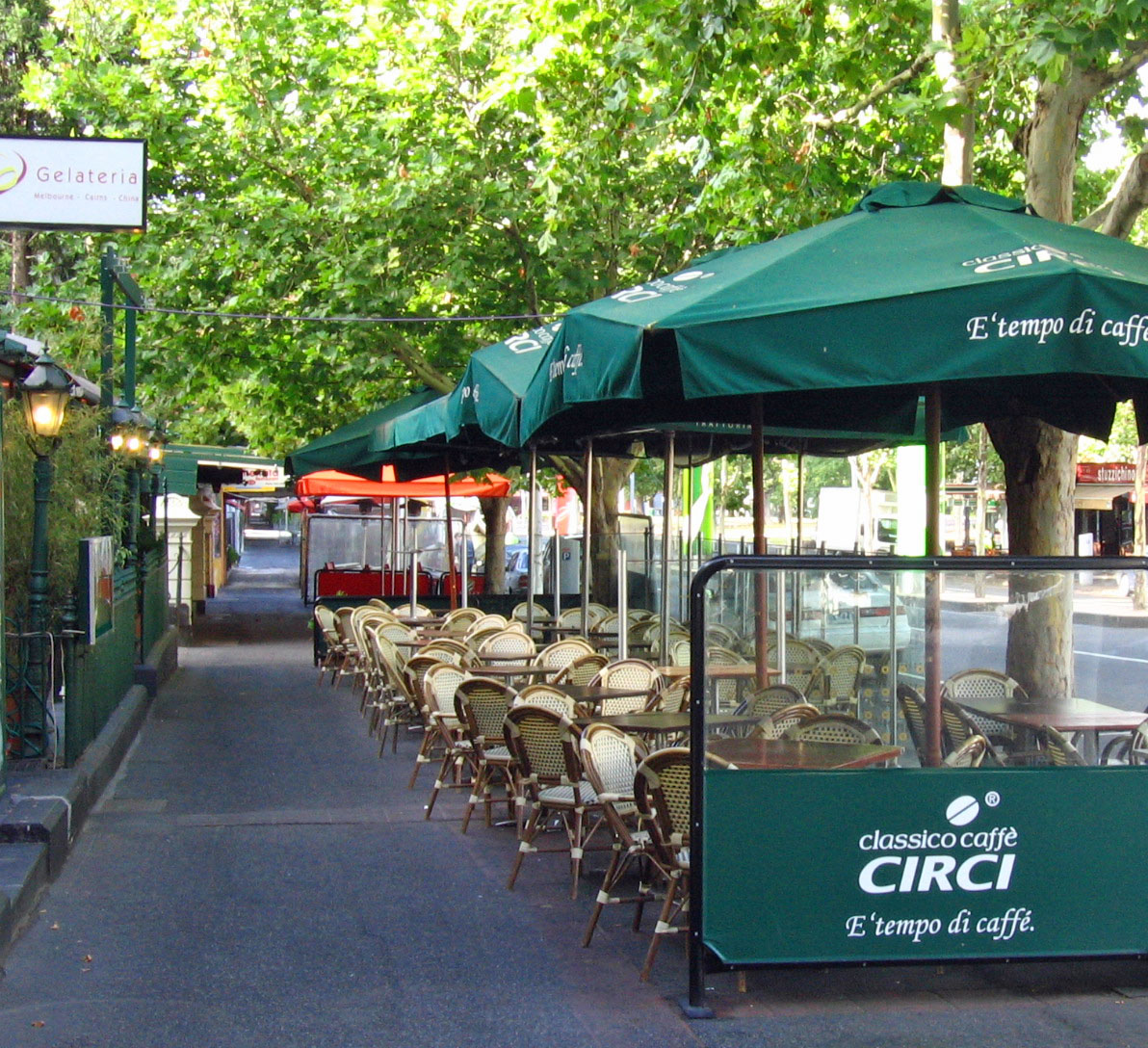
Alfresco dining along Lygon Street

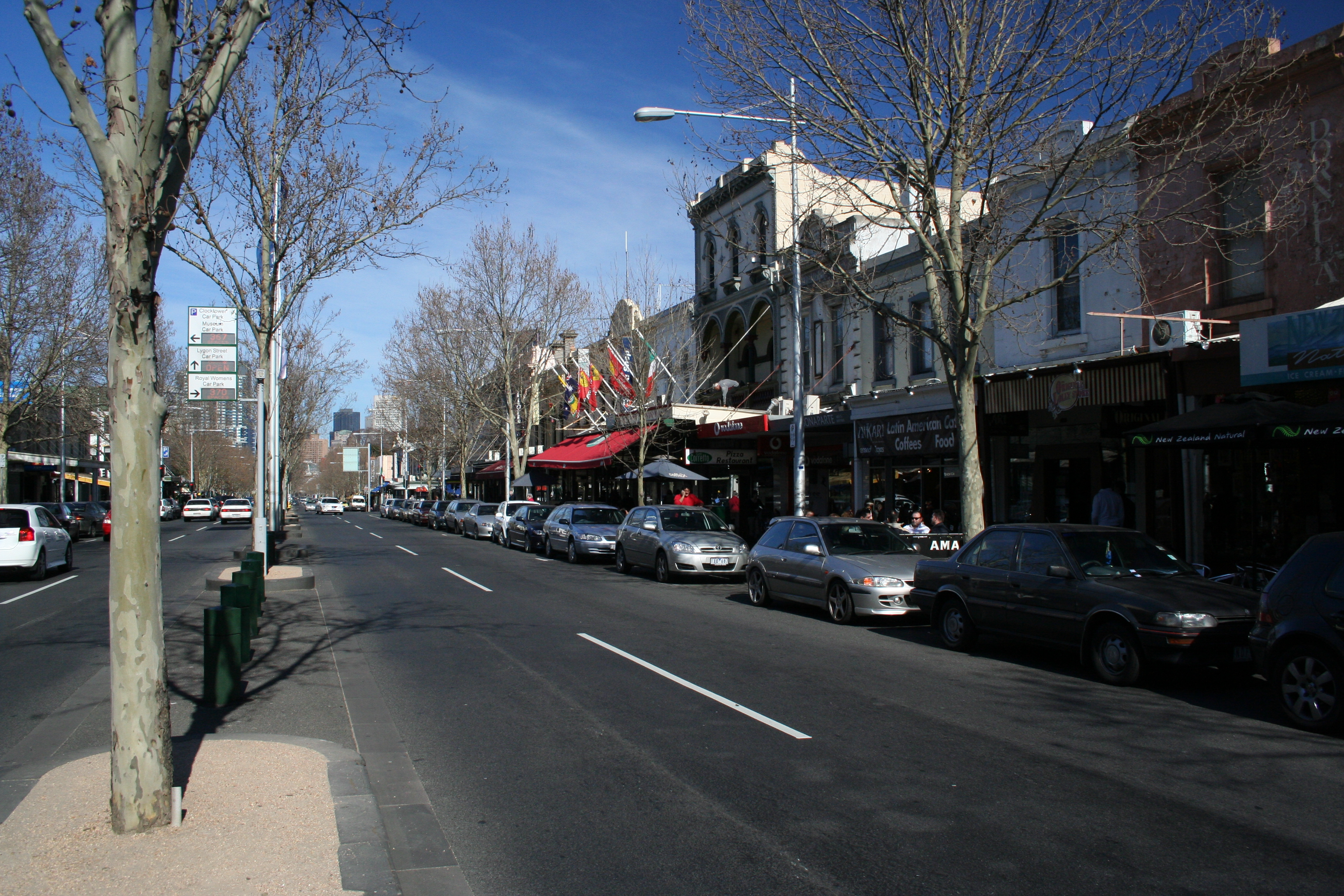
Lygon Street, Carlton, looking south east

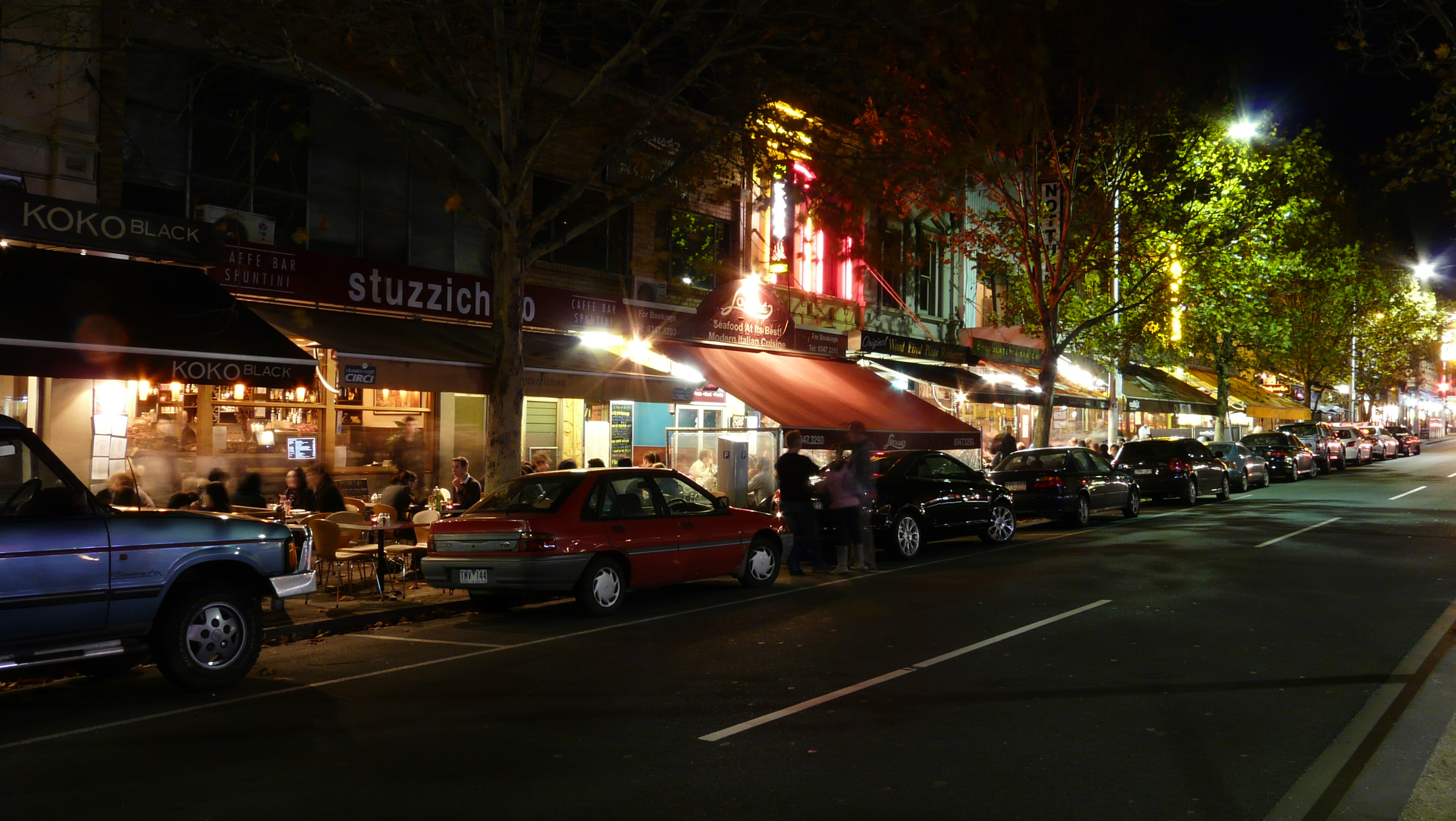
The street at night

Lygon Street is located in Melbourne, Victoria, Australia, running through the inner northern suburbs of Carlton, Carlton North, Princes Hill and Brunswick East. Lygon Street is synonymous with the Italian community of Melbourne, forming the nexus point of Little Italy. It is home to many Italian restaurants and alfresco cafés.

== Geography ==
Lygon Street runs north–south through the inner northern suburbs of Melbourne. At its southernmost end, it connects to Russell Street in the Hoddle Grid; it then proceeds northward, through Carlton, Carlton North, and Brunswick East, to its intersection with Albion Street. Although the roadway itself continues, it is renamed Holmes Street for the stretch between Albion Street and Moreland Road, and later renamed again to Nicholson Street for the stretch between Moreland Road and the street's terminus at Bell Street. (Note that this is not continuous with the Nicholson Street which runs through the Melbourne CBD, Fitzroy, Carlton and Brunswick East.) North of Park Street, the street numbers restart at 1.

Tram routes 1 and 6 run along Lygon Street between Elgin Street, Carlton, and Albion Street, Brunswick East.

== Italian restaurant district ==
The Italian restaurant district synonymous with Lygon Street occupies the few blocks between Queensberry Street and Elgin Street in Carlton. It is populated by the Italian families which migrated here in the 1950s, and holds the record of being the first place to install an espresso machine in Australia. It is also considered the birthplace of the 'Aussie' pizza. The area is heavily European in nature, and is the home of the yearly Lygon Street Festa, one of Australia's largest outdoor street festivals. The La Mama Theatre and Courthouse Theatre are also in this area, as is the heritage-listed neon sign at Borsari's Corner, named after Italian cyclist Nino Borsari, on the corner of Grattan Street. Toto's Pizza House, the first pizzeria established in Australia, has been located at the southern end of Lygon Street continuously since its opening in 1961.

== Cinema Nova ==
Cinema Nova is an independent cinema with 16 screens, that shows Australian, indie, and arthouse films. It was established in 1992, when the Longford Cinema in South Yarra and the Valhalla Cinema in Richmond and Westgarth collaborated to open it as a twin cinema. The cinema hosts film festivals such as Melbourne Queer Film Festival, Monster Fest, Melbourne Documentary Film Festival, and Transitions Film Festival.

Cinema Nova formerly sponsored the Cinema Nova Award for Best Fiction Short Film, an AACTA-accredited award worth A$3,000 cash, at the Melbourne International Film Festival, but the cinema has since dropped that sponsorship.

== Other points of interest ==
The two blocks running between Grattan Street and Elgin Street are known for shopping and boutiques.

Melbourne Trades Hall occupies the corner of Lygon Street and Victoria Street.

Melbourne General Cemetery is situated on the western side of Lygon Street in North Carlton, between Cemetery Road and Macpherson Street.

The East Brunswick Club opened its doors as a music venue at the northern end of the street in May 2006.

Lygon Street was the main headquarters of an Italian Australian criminal organisation called The Carlton Crew.

== Gallery ==
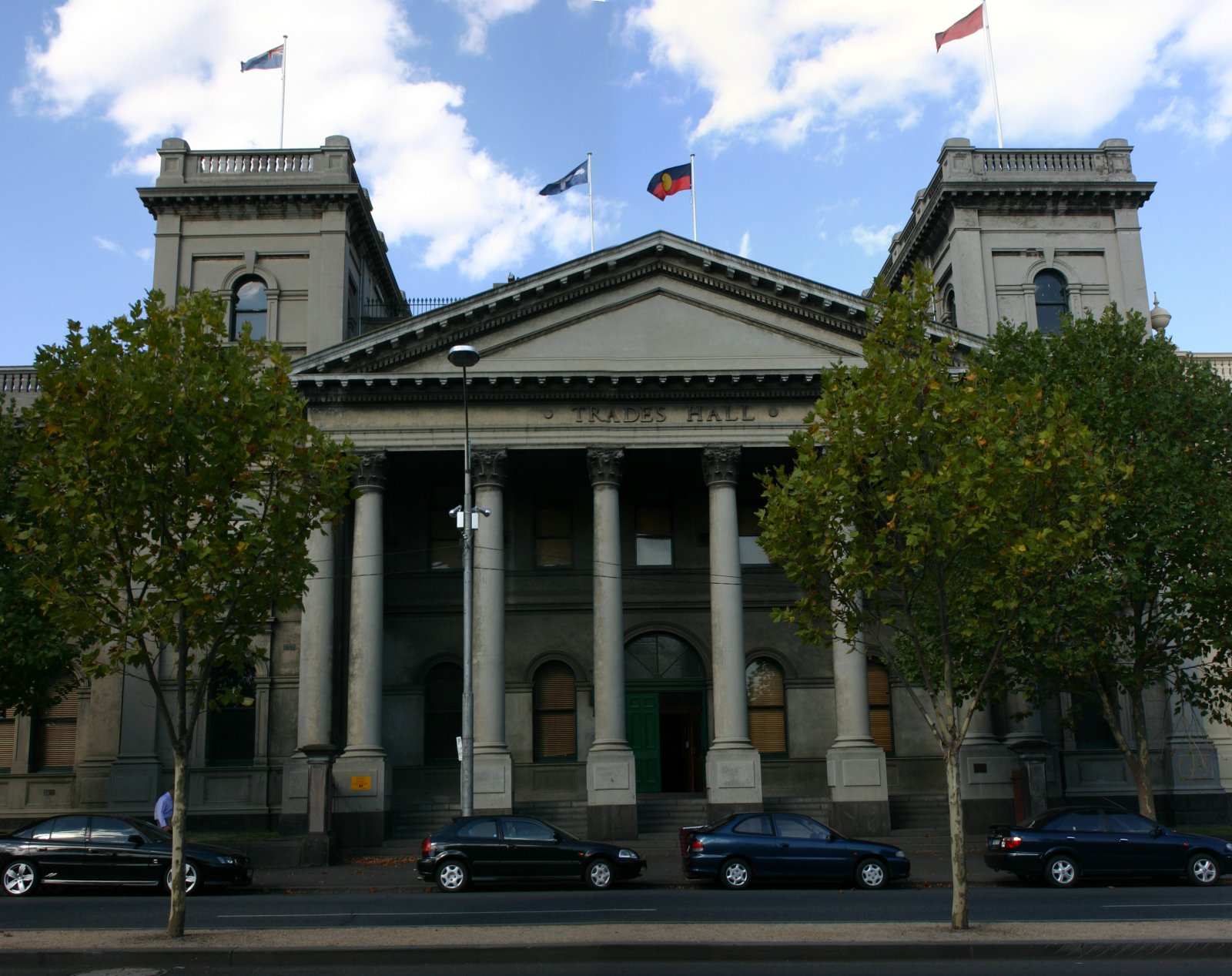
Melbourne Trades Hall

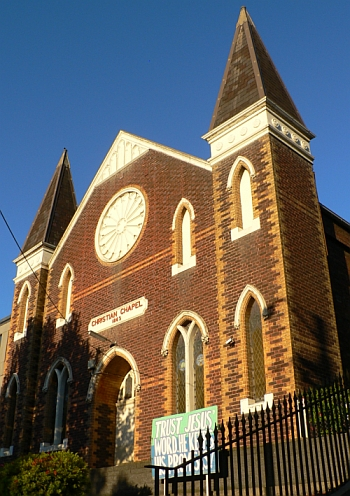
Christian Chapel

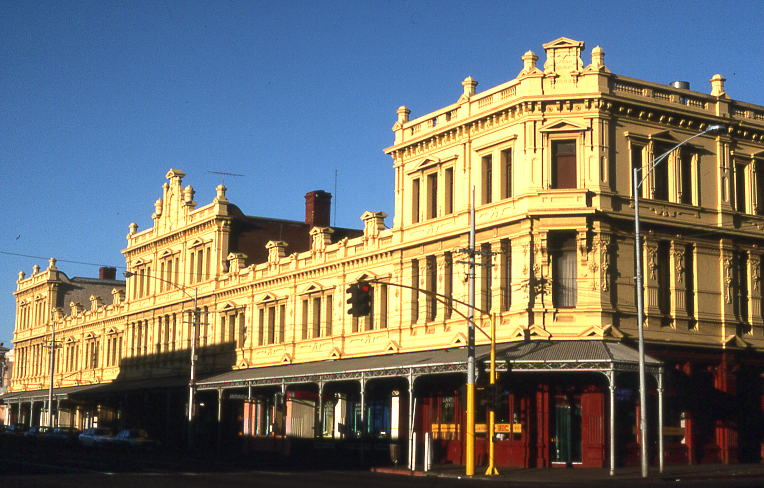
Lygon Buildings, built in 1888

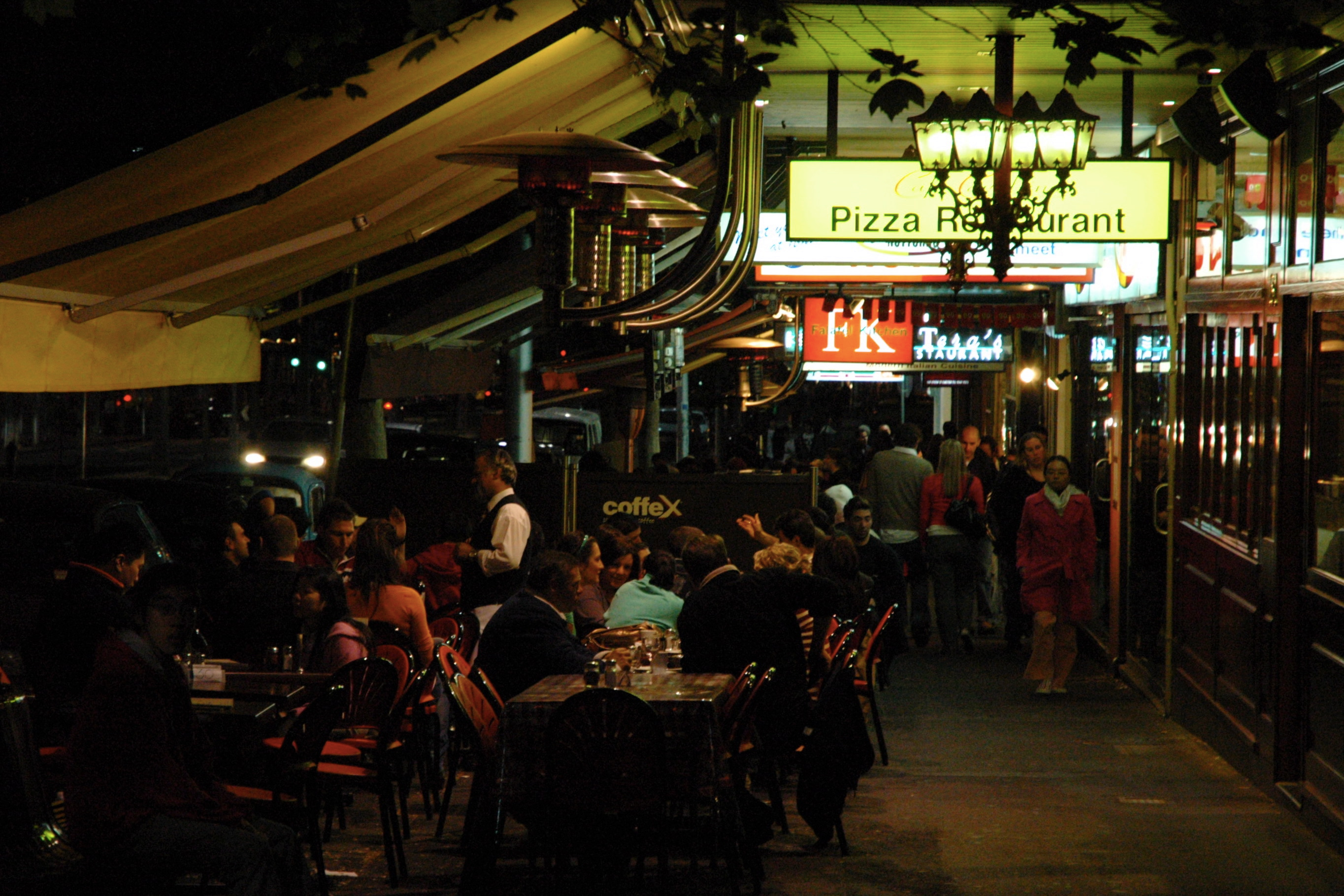
Italian restaurants on Lygon Street at night
