= Lygon Street Christian Chapel =

Coordinates: 37°48′21.244″S 144°57′58.291″E

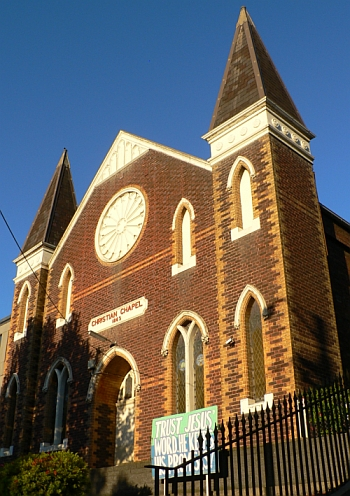
- Interactive map of the Lygon Street Christian Chapel area

General information
- Type: Church
- Architectural style: Classical
- Location: 42-54 Lygon Street, Melbourne, Victoria, Australia, Australia
- Completed: 1865

Design and construction
- Architect: W.M. Moore

Lygon Street Christian Chapel is an Evangelical church in the inner-city suburb of Carlton, Melbourne, Victoria, Australia, built in 1865, and designed by architect W.M. Moore. The services were led by a 'preacher'. The preacher prior to February 1867 was American Reverend H.S. Earl. He was replaced by fellow Americans T.J. Gore and G.L. Surben.

The chapel contains a "fine example of late 19th century organ building" with an original working organ thought to have been made by Fincham & Hobday in the early 1890s, installed in the chapel in 1913.
