= Graduate House, Melbourne =

Graduate House
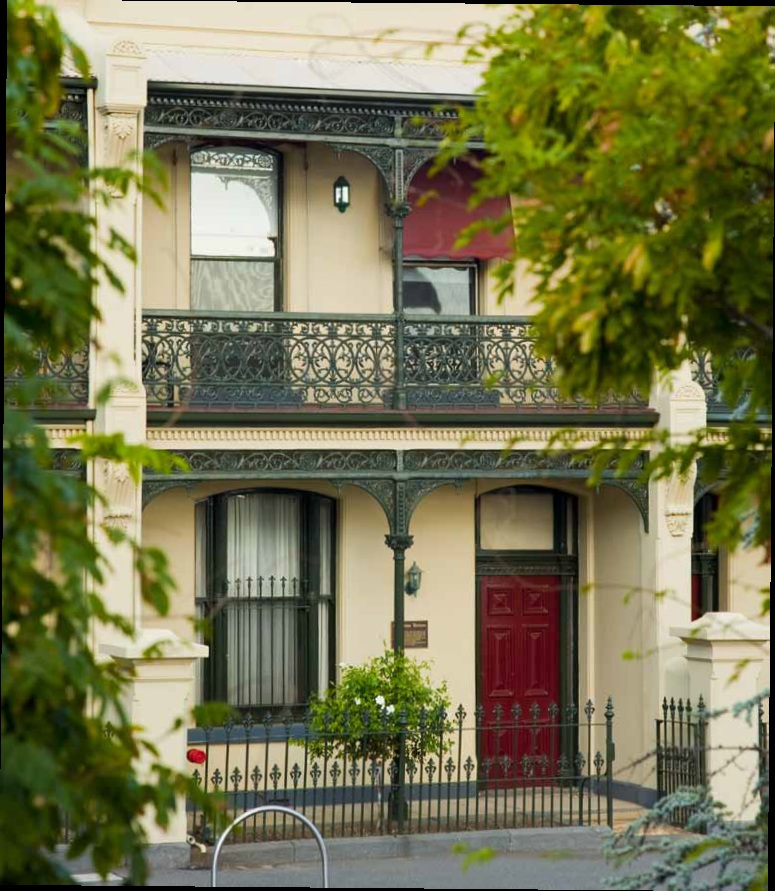

- Location: 220 Leicester Street, Carlton, Victoria, 3053
- Coordinates: 37°48′2.5″S 144°57′41″E
- Full name: Graduate Union of the University of Melbourne Incorporated
- Established: 4 May 1911; 115 years ago
- Former names: The Melbourne University Graduates Association
- Postgraduates: 145
- Website: Official website

Graduate House is a residential college and an academic and professional development meeting and gathering place in Melbourne, Victoria, Australia.

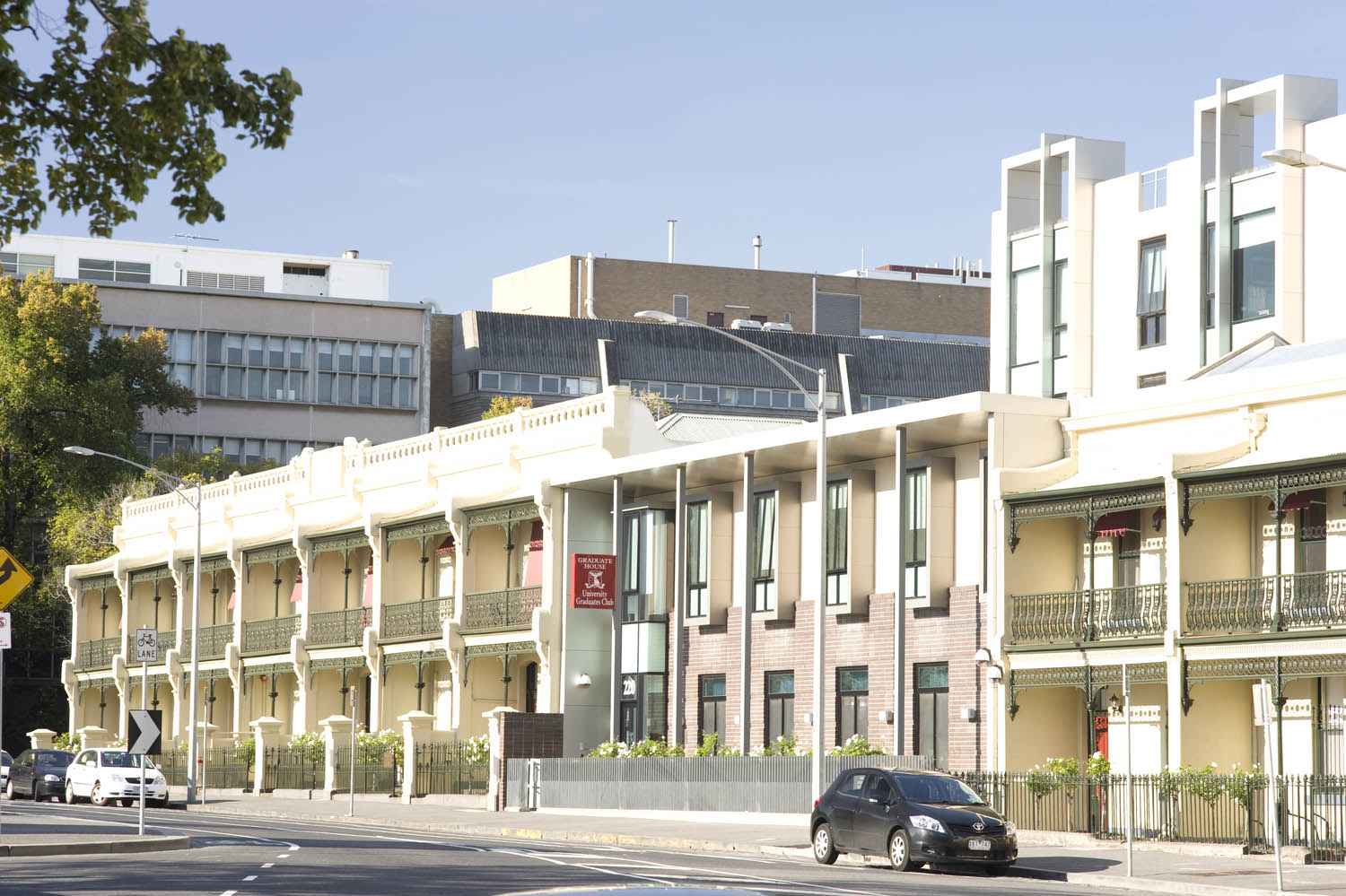
Graduate Union is a residential college and meeting place

Graduate House is on Leicester Street, Carlton, just north of Melbourne’s CBD and in the heart of the education precinct between two major Melbourne-based universities – University of Melbourne and RMIT University.

It overlooks University Square and neighbours Melbourne Business School, the Grattan Institute and Melbourne School of Engineering. It is across the park from Melbourne Law School, the Faculty of Business and Economics.

== Live at Graduate House ==
Graduate House is the only dedicated graduate residential college in Victoria, Australia. The people who live at Graduate House are graduates – some are enrolled at a university in Melbourne at the postgraduate level (e.g., Masters by coursework, Research Masters or doctorate, professional doctorate, postgraduate diploma). Others are visiting academics who are undertaking sessional teaching and tutoring, researchers working in research institutes and universities, clinicians and consultants working in hospitals and other medical and public health facilities and those on sabbatical needing to focus for a few months on their specialist field.

Graduate House has different room types for different preferences and budgets, ranging from single and double ensuite and non-ensuite rooms to self-contained apartments. Graduate House provides meals, housekeeping and laundry facilities.

Graduate House comprises three linked buildings along Leicester Street, and offsite bedsit single apartments in Barry Street and Barkly Place. The newest wing is the Stella Langford wing fronted by three terrace facades and holding three new conference and event rooms and luxury apartments. The middle section (main building) contains offices, conference rooms, and a restaurant and bar on the ground floor, together with three floors of rooms with separate bathrooms and a multi-storey car park. The oldest section retains the comfort and elegance of its long history. It contains resident facilities (kitchen, dining room, lounge) together with a library and rooms with shared bathrooms.

== Membership Association ==
Graduate House is owned and run by a membership association called The Graduate Union of The University of Melbourne Inc.

The Association is more than 110 years old and benefits graduates at any life stage. It is inclusive and egalitarian, and enables networking of positive influence on careers, the mind and in developing collective projects.

The Members of this Association are graduates from all:

- universities - not just The University of Melbourne
- disciplines - from science, technology, engineering and mathematics, to medicine and allied health, law, business and economics through to the arts, languages, social sciences and creative industries.
- life stages and ages - with Members ranging in age from early 20s to early 100s
- ethnicity - Members are located all around the world and Resident Members are from all across Australia and the world
- beliefs, expressions, sides of politics and viewpoints.

Divisions of membership include:

- non-resident members - from all over the world – some working in their professions, some taking career breaks, some in academia/research and others enjoying well-earned retirements
- Resident Members - from all over the world who live at Graduate House while undertaking post-graduate studies, research, professional development, teaching and tutoring, university business and sabbaticals
- Organisation/Group Members - who organise meetings and functions at Graduate House and/or online - seminars, conferences, lectures, professional development, board meetings, planning meetings and celebratory occasions.

== History ==
The Association celebrated its centenary in 2011, having originated on 4 May 1911 when a group of graduates met for the purposes of continuing to meet like-minded people after graduation. Unique for this time in Victoria, Australia, those meeting were of different disciplines, sexes, ethnicities, life stages and beliefs. From its origins, this Association was thus diverse - and it is this diversity that has enabled growth, generational membership, global influence, continued learning and quality improvements, and sustainability.

Less than two months after the first meeting, the Melbourne University Graduates Association was formed with Sir John Monash as its first president for the three years before he commenced his war service in 1914.

Following strong support from Sir Robert Menzies (who was the Association's treasurer in 1919), a substantial gift from Sir Sydney Myer and hard work by William (Bill) Berry, the Association purchased old terrace houses (Gladstone Terrace) in 1957. Barbara Funder, often referred to as the 'college mother' then joined staff, and worked tirelessly with Bill Berry to supervise the refurbishment of the terraces and the opening of Graduate House as a graduate-only residential college in 1962. With a further gift from Stella Langford in the late 1960s, three neighbouring terrace houses on Leicester Street were also purchased.

The college has since expanded significantly over the decades since. In 2005 the central four storey wing was built (replacing a farming equipment distribution warehouse). This central wing has a ground floor dining room and meeting and function spaces, and three floors of en-suite residential rooms. In 2010, the Stella Langford wing terraces were renovated to include ground floor meeting spaces, ten self-contained apartments and a secure car park. The Association has also purchased offsite bedsits in Barry Street (2016) and Barkly Place (2018).
