= Park Street/Fitzroy Street tram stop =

Tram stop in Melbourne, Australia

Park Street/Fitzroy Street
- A C2 Class runs along Fitzroy Street, 2025

General information
- Location: Fitzroy Street, St Kilda, Melbourne, Victoria
- Owner: VicTrack
- Operator: Yarra Trams
- Platforms: 2 (Fitzroy Street); 1 (Park Street)
- Tracks: 2 (Fitzroy Street); 1 (Park Street)
- Connections: Bus

Construction
- Structure type: At-grade

Other information
- Status: Open
- Fare zone: Myki zone 1

History
- Opened: 30 October 1925 (Fitzroy Street); 1959 (Park Street)
- Rebuilt: 2010
- Electrified: 30 October 1925

Services
Preceding station	Yarra Trams	Following station
Canterbury Road/Fitzroy Street towards Melbourne University	Route 16	Alfred Square/The Esplanade towards Kew
Canterbury Road/Fitzroy Street towards East Brunswick	Route 96	Alfred Square/The Esplanade towards St Kilda Beach
Services from Park Street
Mary Street/Park Street towards Victoria Gardens	Route 12	Terminus
Former services
Preceding station	Yarra Trams	Following station
Canterbury Road/Fitzroy Street towards Melbourne University	Route 3a (2009-2023)	Alfred Square/The Esplanade towards East Malvern
Location

Park Street/Fitzroy Street is a tram stop located on The Esplanade in St Kilda. It is served by tram Routes 12, 16 and 96 in Melbourne. The stop opened in October 1891 as part of a new cable tram line running from St Kilda to Windsor, with electric trams provided in 1925. The tram stop serves the surrounding streets of Park Street and Jackson Street.

== History ==
The tram line along Fitzroy Street was opened on 30 October 1925, as part of a new electric tram line running from St Kilda Junction on St Kilda Road along Fitzroy Street into St Kilda. The new tram line also coincided with the conversion of the existing cable tram line on The Esplanade along the St Kilda beachfront into electric operation, allowing trams to reach St Kilda from Caulfield and the city. This had come after the City of South Melbourne had called for the Prahran and Malvern Tramways Trust to link their existing line to St Kilda railway station on Fitzroy Street.

In 1957, the MMTB began planning to move its Beaconsfield Parade terminus of the Park Street line to instead be located on Park Street, at the intersection with Fitzroy. At this time, trams running on Park Street would turn right onto Mary Street then left onto Beaconsfield Parade. Construction began on the relocation in 1959 with the new terminus on Park Street opening on 13 November 1959. The line running onto Beaconsfield Parade was also removed during this time.

After the opening of the new Park Street terminus in 1959, no connection was provided from the terminus onto Fitzroy Street. This was until 1995 when construction commenced on a connection from the Park Street terminus onto Fitzroy Street, facing north (towards Melbourne). The new link was built as a single track and was commissioned on 4 December 1995, allowing trams from Park Street to continue onto Fitzroy Street.

In 2010, tram stops along Fitzroy Street were all upgraded from ground level stops to accessible platform stops. Park Street/Fitzroy Street was one of the upgraded stops and was rebuilt in 2010 to include two platforms in a side platform arrangement.

On 31 January 2009, the Route 3 was altered on weekends to divert from its normal route on St Kilda Road to instead traverse through St Kilda and along Carlisle Street. This was done to better serve the St Kilda area which saw significantly more traffic on weekends, with patronage on Routes 16 and 96 reflecting this increased demands. This change was reverted on 30 October 2023 as part of a wider tram timetable change with Route 3 returning to its previous weekend alignment along St Kilda Road, following the same route as it does on weekdays.

== Services ==
Park Street/Fitzroy Street is served by trams on routes 12, 16 and 96. The Route 12 runs from its terminus at Park Street to Victoria Gardens via Collins Street. Route 16 runs from Melbourne University to Kew via St Kilda. Route 96 runs between East Brunswick and Acland Street, running along the former St Kilda railway line.
