= Canterbury Road/Fitzroy Street tram stop =

Tram stop in Melbourne, Australia

Canterbury Road/Fitzroy Street
- A C2 Class runs along Fitzroy Street, 2025

General information
- Location: Fitzroy Street, St Kilda, Melbourne, Victoria
- Owner: VicTrack
- Operator: Yarra Trams
- Platforms: 2
- Tracks: 2
- Connections: Bus

Construction
- Structure type: At-grade

Other information
- Status: Open
- Fare zone: Myki zone 1

History
- Opened: 30 October 1925
- Electrified: 30 October 1925

Services
Preceding station	Yarra Trams	Following station
Princes Street/Fitzroy Street towards Melbourne University	Route 16	Park Street/Fitzroy Street towards Kew
St Kilda towards East Brunswick	Route 96	Park Street/Fitzroy Street towards St Kilda Beach
Former services
Preceding station	Yarra Trams	Following station
Princes Street/Fitzroy Street towards Melbourne University	Route 3a (2009-2023)	Park Street/Fitzroy Street towards East Malvern
Location

Canterbury Road/Fitzroy Street is a tram stop located on Fitzroy Street in St Kilda. It is served by tram Routes 16 and 96 in Melbourne. The stop opened in October 1925 as an extension of an existing electric line running to St Kilda, seeing the conversion of the Fitzroy Street line from cable to electric operation.

== History ==
The tram line along Fitzroy Street was opened on 30 October 1925, as part of a new electric tram line running from St Kilda Junction on St Kilda Road along Fitzroy Street into St Kilda. The new tram line also coincided with the conversion of the existing cable tram line on The Esplanade along the St Kilda beachfront into electric operation, allowing trams to reach St Kilda from Caulfield and the city. This had come after the City of South Melbourne had called for the Prahran and Malvern Tramways Trust to link their existing line to St Kilda railway station on Fitzroy Street.

In 1987, a new junction was built from Fitzroy Street facing northwards to connect to the St Kilda line which was at the time, being converted from a heavy rail line into a light rail line to be used by new trams. The heavy rail line to St Kilda was closed on 1 August 1987 with tram services along Fitzroy Street disrupted and/or diverted during construction of the new connection. The new converted St Kilda line light rail was opened on 21 November 1987, with the line being served by an extended Route 96 which had previously terminated at Spencer Street station on Bourke Street.

In August 2008, a project was undertaken to renew the track on the St Kilda light rail between Port Junction and the intersection with Fitzroy Street. This project lasted from 23 August until 31 August and caused Route 96 trams to be diverted onto Park Street, terminating at Park Street, the regular Route 112 (now Route 12) terminus.

On 31 January 2009, the Route 3 was altered on weekends to divert from its normal route on St Kilda Road to instead traverse through St Kilda and along Carlisle Street. This was done to better serve the St Kilda area which saw significantly more traffic on weekends, with patronage on Routes 16 and 96 reflecting this increased demands. This change was reverted on 30 October 2023 as part of a wider tram timetable change with Route 3 returning to its previous weekend alignment along St Kilda Road, following the same route as it does on weekdays.

== Services ==
Canterbury Road/Fitzroy Street is served by trams on routes 16 and 96. The Route 16 runs from Melbourne University to Kew via St Kilda. Route 96 runs between East Brunswick and Acland Street, running along the former St Kilda railway line.
