= Alfred Square/The Esplanade tram stop =

Tram stop in Melbourne, Australia

Alfred Square/The Esplanade
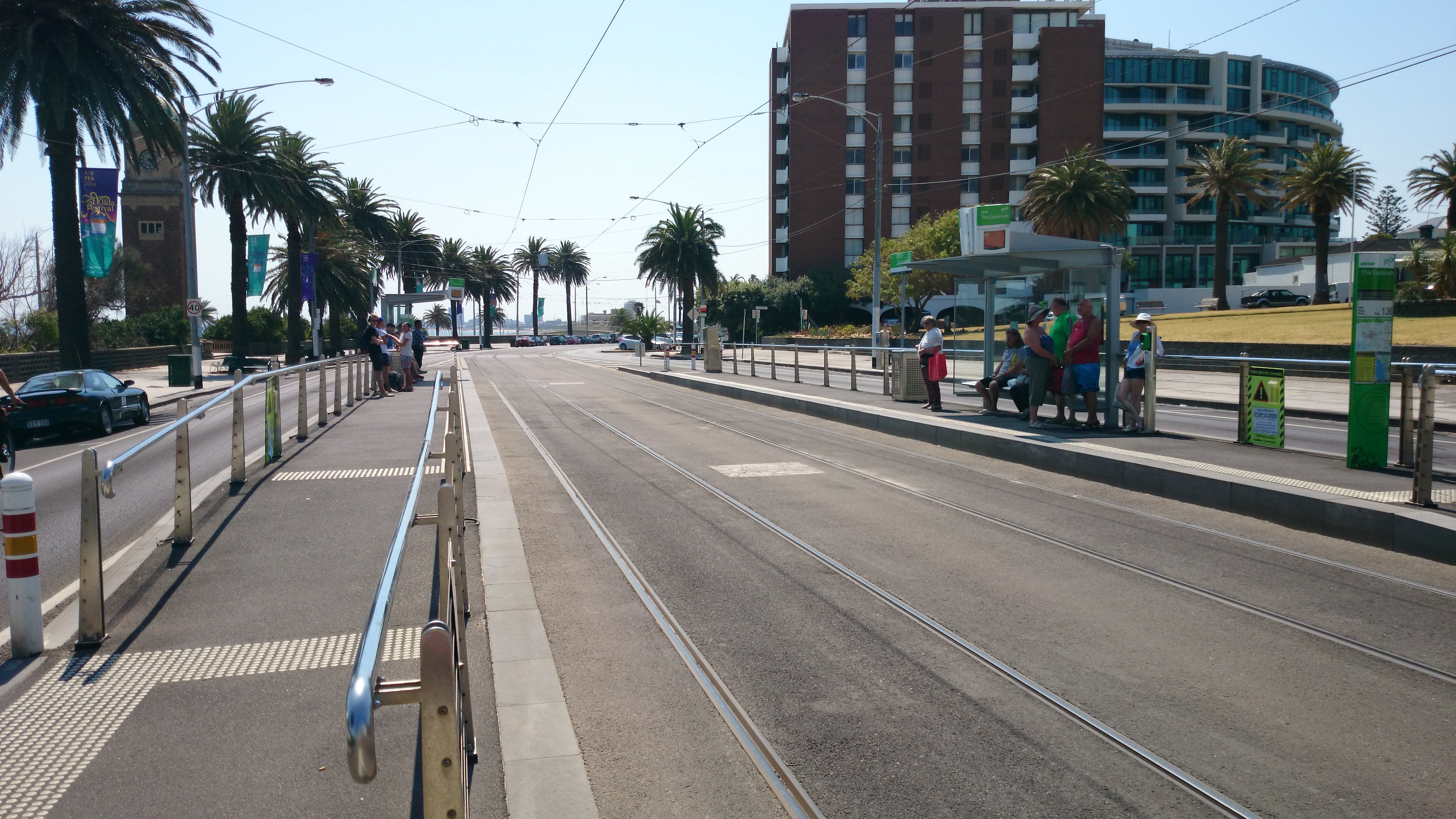
- Northbound view from the tram stop, February 2014

General information
- Location: The Esplanade, St Kilda, Melbourne, Victoria
- Owner: VicTrack
- Operator: Yarra Trams
- Platforms: 2
- Tracks: 2
- Connections: Bus

Construction
- Structure type: At-grade

Other information
- Status: Open
- Fare zone: Myki zone 1

History
- Opened: 17 October 1891
- Rebuilt: 3 December 2009
- Electrified: December 1925

Services
Preceding station	Yarra Trams	Following station
Park Street/Fitzroy Street towards Melbourne University	Route 16	Luna Park/The Esplanade towards Kew
Park Street/Fitzroy Street towards East Brunswick	Route 96	Luna Park/The Esplanade towards St Kilda Beach
Former services
Preceding station	Yarra Trams	Following station
Park Street/Fitzroy Street towards Melbourne University	Route 3a (2009-2023)	Luna Park/The Esplanade towards East Malvern
Location

Alfred Square/The Esplanade is a tram stop located on The Esplanade in St Kilda. It is served by tram Routes 16 and 96 in Melbourne. The stop opened in October 1891 as part of a new cable tram line running from St Kilda to Windsor, with electric trams provided in 1925. The tram stop serves the adjacent Alfred Square and St Kilda Beach.

== History ==
The first trams to run nearby to the current Alfred Square stop was a cable tram line, it ran between St Kilda Beach along Carlisle Street and towards Windsor. This cable tram line was opened on 17 October 1891.

In 1913, the Prahran and Malvern Tramways Trust opened a new electric tramway from Dandenong Road along Carlisle Street from the north then onto The Esplanade with the junction to Acland Street. This new electric tram line terminated at Luna Park until the cable tram east was converted into electric operation in 1925.

In March 1916, the Prahran and Malvern Tramways Trust opened a balloon loop immediately north of the stop, allowing trams to be reversed without the cable operator needing to change ends or use a turntable.

In 1925, conversion of the cable tram line along The Esplanade to electric operation commenced. Electric trams began running on The Esplanade on 27 December 1925.

In December 2009, the tram stop was rebuilt as part of a junction rebuild between The Esplanade, Acland Street and Carlisle Street. The new stop was built south of the former location and was built long enough to be used by D2 Class trams. The new stop was opened on 3 December 2009 as part of a project to rebuild the tram junction between Acland Street and Carlisle Street.

On 31 January 2009, the Route 3 was altered on weekends to divert from its normal route on St Kilda Road to instead traverse through St Kilda and along Carlisle Street. This was done to better serve the St Kilda area which saw significantly more traffic on weekends, with patronage on Routes 16 and 96 reflecting this increased demands. This change was reverted on 30 October 2023 as part of a wider tram timetable change with Route 3 returning to its previous weekend alignment along St Kilda Road, following the same route as it does on weekdays.

== Services ==
Alfred Square/The Esplanade is served by trams on routes 16 and 96. The Route 16 runs from Melbourne University to Kew via St Kilda. Route 96 runs between East Brunswick and Acland Street, running along the former St Kilda railway line.
