= Luna Park/The Esplanade tram stop =

Tram stop in Melbourne, Australia

Coordinates: 37.8670°S 144.9771°E

Luna Park/The Esplanade
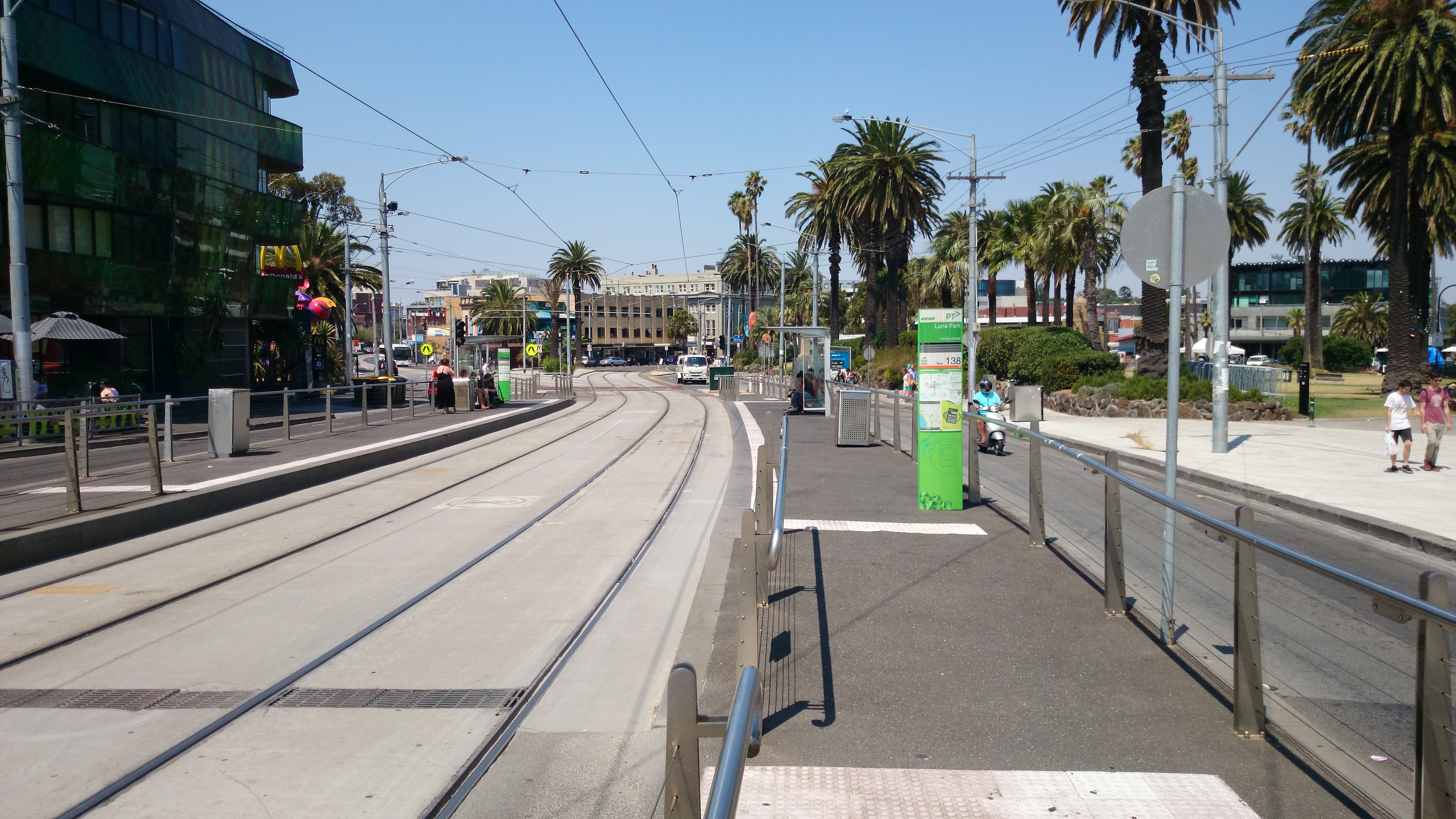
- Southbound view from the tram stop, February 2014

General information
- Location: Acland Street, St Kilda, Melbourne, Victoria
- Owner: VicTrack
- Operator: Yarra Trams
- Platforms: 2
- Tracks: 2
- Connections: Bus

Construction
- Structure type: At-grade

Other information
- Status: Open
- Fare zone: Myki zone 1

History
- Opened: 17 October 1891
- Rebuilt: 3 December 2009
- Electrified: December 1925
- Former names: Carlisle Street/The Esplanade

Services
Preceding station	Yarra Trams	Following station
Alfred Square/The Esplanade towards Melbourne University	Route 16	Barkly Street/Carlisle Street towards Kew
Alfred Square/The Esplanade towards East Brunswick	Route 96	Acland Street Terminus
Former services
Preceding station	Yarra Trams	Following station
Alfred Square/The Esplanade towards Melbourne University	Route 3a (2009-2023)	Barkly Street/Carlisle Street towards East Malvern
Alfred Square/The Esplanade towards Melbourne University	Route 16 (-2004)	Acland Street Terminus
Alfred Square/The Esplanade towards St Kilda	Route 69 (-2004)	Barkly Street/Carlisle Street towards Kew
Location

Luna Park/The Esplanade is a tram stop located on The Esplanade in St Kilda. It is served by tram Routes 16 and 96 in Melbourne. The stop opened in October 1891 as part of a new cable tram line running from St Kilda to Windsor, with electric trams provided in 1925. The tram stop serves the adjacent Luna Park.

== History ==
The first trams to run through the current Luna Park stop was a cable tram line, it ran between St Kilda Beach along Carlisle Street and towards Windsor. This cable tram line was opened on 17 October 1891.

Luna Park was opened adjacent to the tram stop on 13 December 1912 and quickly became a popular attraction.

In March 1916, the Prahran and Malvern Tramways Trust opened a balloon loop immediately north of the stop, allowing trams to be reversed without the cable operator needing to change ends or use a turntable.

In 1925, conversion of the cable tram line along The Esplanade to electric operation commenced. The cable tram service was withdrawn on 29 August 1925 to allow for conversion works. Electric trams began running on The Esplanade on 27 December 1925. This conversion also marked the first cable tram line to be closed and converted into an electric tramway in Melbourne.

In December 2009, the tram stop was rebuilt as part of a junction rebuild between The Esplanade, Acland Street and Carlisle Street. The new stop was built south of the former location and was built long enough to be used by D2 Class trams. The new stop was opened on 3 December 2009.

On 31 January 2009, the Route 3 was altered on weekends to divert from its normal route on St Kilda Road to instead traverse through St Kilda and along Carlisle Street. This was done to better serve the St Kilda area which saw significantly more traffic on weekends, with patronage on Routes 16 and 96 reflecting this increased demands. This change was reverted on 30 October 2023 as part of a wider tram timetable change with Route 3 returning to its previous weekend alignment along St Kilda Road, following the same route as it does on weekdays.

== Services ==
Luna Park/The Esplanade is served by trams on routes 16 and 96. Route 16 runs from Melbourne University in Carlton via St Kilda to Kew. Route 96 runs from East Brunswick, via the Melbourne CBD to Acland Street.
