= List of acts of the Parliament of Victoria from 1919 =

This is a list of acts of the Parliament of Victoria, Australia for the year 1919.

== 1919 ==
Short title, or popular name	Citation	Royal assent
Long title
Melbourne and Metropolitan Tramways Act 1918	9 Geo. V. No. 2995	7 January 1919
An Act relating to Metropolitan Tramways and for other purposes.
Electricity Commissioners Act 1918	9 Geo. V. No. 2996	7 January 1919
An Act relating to the Constitution of a Body of Electricity Commissioners and the Powers and Duties thereof and to amend the Law relating to Electric Light and Power.
	9 Geo. V. No. 2997	7 January 1919
An Act to apply a sum out of the Consolidated Revenue to the service of the year ending on the thirtieth day of June One thousand nine hundred and nineteen and to appropriate the Supplies granted in this Session of Parliament.
Marriage (Validating) Act 1919	9 Geo. V. No. 2998	13 May 1919 (Note: This act was reserved for approval by His Majesty.)
An Act to provide Facilities for enabling certain Marriages in Fact to be declared not to be invalid.
	10 Geo. V. No. 2999	11 July 1919
An Act to apply out of the Consolidated Revenue the sum of Two millions six hundred and eleven thousand eight hundred and fifty-eight pounds to the service of the year One thousand nine hundred and nineteen and One thousand nine hundred and twenty.
	10 Geo. V. No. 3000	14 August 1919
An Act to apply out of the Consolidated Revenue the sum of Five hundred and twelve thousand eight hundred and thirty-six pounds to the service of the year One thousand nine hundred and eighteen and One thousand nine hundred and nineteen.
Children's Maintenance Act 1919	10 Geo. V. No. 3001	9 September 1919
An Act to make provision with respect to certain Children without Sufficient Means of Support and for other purposes.
Audit Act 1919 (repealed)	10 Geo. V. No. 3002	9 September 1919
An Act to amend Section Seven of the Audit Act 1915. (Note: Audit Act 1915 (6 Geo. V. No. 2516)) (Repealed by Audit Act 1928 (19 Geo. V. No. 3640))
Auction Sales (Inter-State) Act 1919 (repealed)	10 Geo. V. No. 3003	9 September 1919
An Act to authorize the Issue of Auctioneers' Licences for Victoria to Auctioneers resident in other States of the Commonwealth of Australia and for other purposes. (Repealed by Auction Sales Act 1928 (19 Geo. V. No. 3639))
	10 Geo. V. No. 3004	10 October 1919
An Act to apply out of the Consolidated Revenue the sum of One million seven hundred and eighty-six thousand one hundred and fifty-five pounds to the service of the year One thousand nine hundred and nineteen and One thousand nine hundred and twenty.
Dairy Produce Act 1919	10 Geo. V. No. 3005	21 October 1919
An Act relating to the Testing Grading and Manufacture of Dairy Produce and for other purposes.
Railways Classification Board Act 1919	10 Geo. V. No. 3006	21 October 1919
An Act to provide for a Railways Classification Board and for other purposes.
State Savings Bank Act 1919	10 Geo. V. No. 3007	21 October 1919
An Act to amend the State Savings Bank Acts and for other purposes.
Marine Act 1919	10 Geo. V. No. 3008	21 October 1919
An Act to amend the Marine Act 1915. (Note: Marine Act 1915 (6 Geo. V. No. 2688))
Mental Treatment Act 1919	10 Geo. V. No. 3009	21 October 1919
An Act relating to the Administration and Management of the Estates of Persons receiving Treatment under the Mental Treatment Act 1915. (Note: Mental Treatment Act 1915 (6 Geo. V. No. 2600))
Marriage (Maintenance) Act 1919	10 Geo. V. No. 3010	21 October 1919
An Act to amend the Marriage Acts.
Railways (Commissioners) Act 1919	10 Geo. V. No. 3011	3 November 1919
An Act relating to the Salary of the Chairman of the Victorian Railways Commissioners.
Victorian Loan Act 1919	10 Geo. V. No. 3012	3 November 1919
An Act to authorize the raising of Money for Railways Public Works and other purposes.
Water Supply Loans Application Act 1919	10 Geo. V. No. 3013	3 November 1919
An Act to sanction the issue and application of certain Sums of Money available under Loan Acts for Irrigation Works Water Supply Works Drainage and Flood Protection Works in Country Districts and for Works under the River Murray Waters Acts and for other purposes.
Railway Loan Application Act 1919	10 Geo. V. No. 3014	3 November 1919
An Act to sanction the issue and application of certain Sums of Money available under Loan Acts for Railways and for other purposes.
Water Supply Loan Act 1919	10 Geo. V. No. 3015	18 November 1919
An Act to increase the Amount of Money which may be raised under and for the purposes of the Water Supply Loans Act 1916. (Note: Water Supply Loans Act 1916 (7 Geo. V. No. 2873))
Geelong Temperance Hall Land Act 1919	10 Geo. V. No. 3016	18 November 1919
An Act to revoke the Permanent Reservation and Crown Grant of certain Land at Geelong permanently reserved from Sale as a Site for a Temperance Hall and for other purposes.
Lang Lang Land Act 1919	10 Geo. V. No. 3017	18 November 1919
An Act to provide for an Exchange of certain Private Land in the Parish of Lang Lang in the County of Mornington and certain Crown Lands and to make certain other Adjustments with respect to Crown Lands in the Parishes of Lang Lang and Yallock in the said County in order to complete a certain Scheme for straightening the Channel of the Lang Lang River and for other purposes.
Acts Interpretation Act 1919 (repealed)	10 Geo. V. No. 3018	28 November 1919
An Act to further amend the Acts Interpretation Act 1915. (Note: Acts Interpretation Act 1915 (6 Geo. V. No. 2609)) (Repealed by Acts Interpretation Act 1928 (19 Geo. V. No. 3630))
	10 Geo. V. No. 3019	5 December 1919
An Act to apply out of the Consolidated Revenue the sum of One million and nineteen thousand one hundred and seven pounds to the service of the year One thousand nine hundred and nineteen and One thousand nine hundred and twenty.
Church-street Bridge Act 1919	10 Geo. V. No. 3020	9 December 1919
An Act relating to the Construction and Maintenance of a Bridge over the River Yarra Yarra in the Cities of Prahran and Richmond.
Surplus Revenue Act 1919	10 Geo. V. No. 3021	16 December 1919
An Act relating to the Surplus Revenue of the Financial Year ended on the thirtieth day of June One thousand nine hundred and nineteen.
Essendon Land Act 1919 (repealed)	10 Geo. V. No. 3022	16 December 1919
An Act to provide for the Closing of Portion of a certain Street in the Municipal District of the City of Essendon and for other purposes. (Repealed by Statute Law Revision Act 1984 (No. 10087))
Melbourne and Metropolitan Tramways Act 1919	10 Geo. V. No. 3023	16 December 1919
An Act to amend Division 8 of Part III. of the Melbourne and Metropolitan Tramways Act 1918. (Note: Melbourne and Metropolitan Tramways Act 1918 (9 Geo. V. No. 2995))
Local Government (Influenza Expenditure) Act 1919	10 Geo. V. No. 3024	16 December 1919
An Act to authorize Councils of Municipalities to provide for Expenditure in connexion with the recent Epidemic of Influenza.
Crimes (Acts of Indecency) Act 1919	10 Geo. V. No. 3025	16 December 1919
An Act to amend the Law with respect to certain Acts of Indecency.
Farmers Arms Hotel, Mysia, Licence Act 1919	10 Geo. V. No. 3026	19 December 1919
An Act to provide for the Renewal of a certain Victualler's Licence in pursuance of a Certificate granted by the Licensing Court for the Licensing District of Wedderburn.
County Court Act 1919	10 Geo. V. No. 3027	19 December 1919
An Act to further amend Section Sixty-four of the County Court Act 1915. (Note: County Court Act 1915 (6 Geo. V. No. 2636))
Licensing Act 1919	10 Geo. V. No. 3028	19 December 1919
An Act to amend the Licensing Acts.
Electricity Supply Loan Act 1919	10 Geo. V. No. 3029	30 December 1919
An Act to authorize the raising of Money for the Purposes of a Scheme prepared pursuant to Section Ten of the Electricity Commissioners Act 1918 (Note: Electricity Commissioners Act 1918 (9 Geo. V. No. 2996)) and to sanction the Issue and Application of such Money for the Purposes of such Scheme.
Necessary Commodities Control Act 1919	10 Geo. V. No. 3030	30 December 1919
An Act to restrict Undue Profit-taking and to provide for the Control of Necessary Commodities and for other purposes.
Wheat Marketing Act 1919	10 Geo. V. No. 3031	30 December 1919
An Act to extend the Operation of and to amend the Wheat Marketing Acts.
Public Works Loan Application Act 1919	10 Geo. V. No. 3032	30 December 1919
An Act to sanction the issue and application of certain Sums of Money available under Loan Acts for Public Works and other purposes.
Land Tax Act 1919	10 Geo. V. No. 3033	30 December 1919
An Act to declare the Rate of Land Tax for the Year ending the thirty-first day of December One thousand nine hundred and twenty.
Railways Classification Board Act 1919 (No. 2)	10 Geo. V. No. 3034	30 December 1919
An Act relating to the Payment of certain Moneys during the current Financial Year for the purposes of Section Fourteen of the Railways Classification Board Act 1919. (Note: Railways Classification Board Act 1919 (10 Geo. V. No. 3006))
Income Tax (Amendment and Rates) Act 1919	10 Geo. V. No. 3035	30 December 1919
An Act to declare the Hates of Income Tax for the year ending on the thirtieth day of June One thousand nine hundred and twenty and to amend and continue the Income Tax Acts.
Midwives Act 1919	10 Geo. V. No. 3036	30 December 1919
An Act to amend Section Fourteen (as re-enacted) of the Midwives Act 1915. (Note: Midwives Act 1915 (6 Geo. V. No. 2773))
Seed Advances Act 1919	10 Geo. V. No. 3037	30 December 1919
An Act to enable Seed and Fodder to be advanced on certain Terms to Cultivators of Land and for other purposes.
Primary Products Advances Act 1919	10 Geo. V. No. 3038	30 December 1919
An Act to provide for the making of Advances to Companies for the purposes of Undertakings for dealing with certain Primary Products.
Discharged Soldiers Settlement Act 1919	10 Geo. V. No. 3039	30 December 1919
An Act to make further provision for the Settlement of Discharged Soldiers on the Land and for other purposes.
Horse Breeding Act 1919	10 Geo. V. No. 3040	30 December 1919
An Act to regulate the Use of Stallions for Stud Purposes.

== Sources ==
- "1919 Victorian Historical Acts". AustLII.
