= Francis Kirby =

Australian electrical engineer and tramway administrator

Francis "Frank" Richard Kirby
- Born: 1911; Victoria, Australia
- Died: 1981; Victoria, Australia
- Occupations: Engineer; Tramways administrator
- Known for: MMTB Chairman (1970–1976)

Francis Richard Kirby (1911–1982) was an Australian electrical engineer and tramway administrator. After working at the State Electricity Commission of Victoria as an engineer, Kirby started working for the Melbourne and Metropolitan Tramways Board (MMTB). He became the MMTB's fourth Chairman in 1970, taking over from Robert Risson, and was succeeded by Dudley Snell, the last Chairman of the MMTB, in 1976.

== Early life ==
Kirby obtained a Bachelor of Electric Engineering from the University of Melbourne in 1936, and commenced work as an engineer at the State Electricity Commission of Victoria.

== Melbourne and Metropolitan Tramways Board ==
Kirby was the Melbourne and Metropolitan Tramways Board's (MMTB) Distribution Engineer from 1953, becoming the MMTB's chief engineer in 1960, and rising to Deputy Chairman, under Major-General Sir Robert Risson, in 1965.

When Kirby succeeded Risson as Chairman of the MMTB on 1 July 1970, it was in a poor financial situation, with debts exceeding AU$6 million and was losing millions of dollars each year. He attributed this loss partly to the number of concession tickets the MMTB provided, stating that if not for the concessions the MMTB would have returned a surplus, and seemed "anxious to convince other departments to accept financial responsibility for their concession travellers". Patronage was also slumping, while the MMTB was facing labour shortages and an ageing rolling stock.

Kirby pragmatically said, "I'm not a tram man. I'm not a bus man. I'm a transport man" in his defence of Melbourne's trams, citing AU$50 million in costs to convert the tram system to bus operation. Kirby also said that "Melbourne is geographically suited to trams, and we have 134 route miles of double track, all in excellent condition. We have in the main, wide streets, and there is no doubt at all that as distinct from a railway, the tram as a street public transport system, has the greatest capacity to move people quickly." Kirby also advocated for the under-grounding of some tram lines for operational savings, and supported a 1974 proposal to reintroduce trams to Sydney.

Following Henry Bolte's resignation in 1972 as Premier of Victoria, Rupert Hamer become Premier and there was a tempering of Victoria's car-dominated transport planning, with some new investment in public transport. This was in part due to a social backlash against Melbourne's freeway plans. Kirby welcomed this change, commenting in 1974 that "we have got to get top-grade public transport. In Melbourne we have the makings of the best public transport system in Australia and perhaps one of the best in the world. But lack of finance has caused it to run down." Kirby lobbied the Hamer Government to order trams, and succeeded, with PCC 1041 (a prototype inspired from a 1965 European fact-finding mission Kirby had been on) entering service (but failing upon launch due to poor electrical equipment, which had been reused from an older prototype PCC 980) in April 1973. Contracts for the Z-class tram, based on PCC 1041, were awarded to Comeng in 1973 with the first Z-class tram entering service in 1975.

Kirby's six-year tenure was the shortest of any MMTB Chairman, and is not looked upon favourably. MMTB debts soared, with financial responsibility, through subsidies, falling on the State Government. This also transferred much decision making power, including the ordering of new trams and buses, out of the hands of the MMTB and into the Government.

Dudley Snell, who had been Deputy Chairman of the MMTB under Kirby, succeeded Kirby as chairman on 16 July 1976.
