= Hector Hercules Bell =

Australian contractor and tramway administrator

Hector Hercules Bell CBE
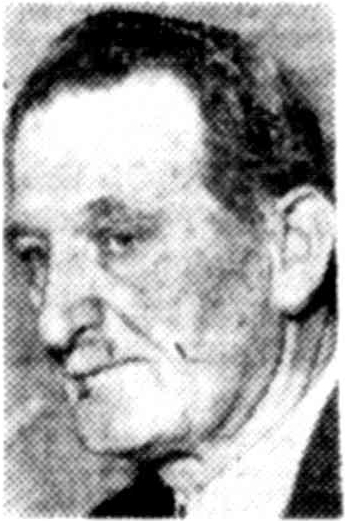
- Hector Hercules Bell in 1935
- Born: 1 December 1876; Richmond, Victoria, Australia
- Died: 12 November 1964 (aged 87); Hawthorn, Victoria, Australia
- Occupations: Contractor; Local councillor; Tramways administrator
- Known for: MMTB Chairman (1936–1949)

Hector Hercules Bell CBE (1 December 1876 – 12 November 1964) was an Australian contractor, municipal councillor, and tramway administrator. Following an initially itinerant working life, Bell married and became a successful businessman, later being elected as a councillor to Richmond City Council. Bell was appointed to the board of the Melbourne & Metropolitan Tramways Board (MMTB) in 1919, and became the MMTB's second chairman in 1936, a position he held until 1949. Under Bell, the MMTB converted the remaining cable trams to electric trams or buses, increased the MMTB's usage of buses, and work towards modernising the tram system, while returning strong surpluses. Bell was primarily a supporter of electric trams advocating their advantages over buses. During his career he ran for a seat on the Victorian Legislative Council, and was occasionally accused of unethical behaviour.

== Early life ==
Hector Hercules Bell was born on 1 December 1876 to Frank Richborough Herbert Bell, a railway worker, and Emily (née Roberts), in Richmond, Victoria (an inner suburb of Melbourne). He was the seventh child of the family, and ran away home at 14, spending three years undertaking itinerant work in rural Victoria. Bell then returned to Melbourne to become a blacksmith and met Emma Watson (d.1945), whom he married 1895.

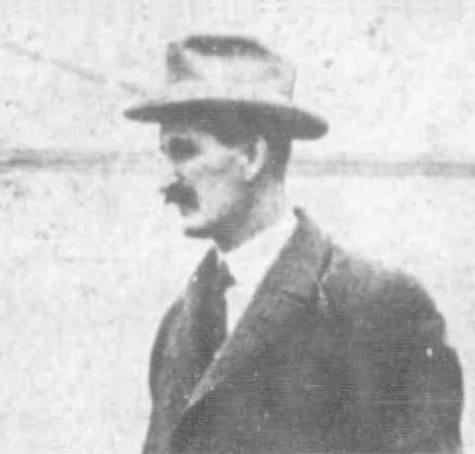
Hector Hercules Bell in 1924

Following marriage, he and Emma moved to Perth, Western Australia, where Bell became a construction contractor, working on a variety of projects including The Causeway over the Swan River. After two years in Perth they returned to Richmond where Bell worked as a confectioner, wood merchant, and contractor. Bell was elected as a councillor to Richmond City Council (amalgamated into City of Yarra in 1994) in 1911, and served in that capacity for 26 years. As member of the councils Labor faction, he became involved in civic issues, and became chairman of the public works committee. During his councillorship he became Richmond's representative on the Melbourne & Metropolitan Board of Works in 1913, and the newly formed Hawthorn Tramway Trust in 1915. In concert with his career as a councillor he continued his contracting business, and due to the success of this enterprise and the accompanying wealth, in 1924 he, Emma, and their three children moved to Hawthorn.

During his term on council Bell became aligned with the right faction of the Labor party, and become acquainted with John Wren. Through his association with Wren, Bell began speculating on land in Melbourne's west. He also became implicated in corrupt behaviour, including accusations of electoral irregularities, and was subjected to a council hearing in 1925, where he was charged with nine offences, all being overturned by council votes.

in 1928 Bell ran for a seat in the Legislative Council of the Parliament of Victoria contesting the electorate of Melbourne South Province. He had been endorsed by then Labor Premier Edmond Hogan in April 1928, but lost the 2 June 1928 election to Nationalist Norman Fraser Falkiner. Although receiving 3,438 first preference votes, more than any other candidate, preferences flowed overwhelmingly to Falkiner as the election had been contested by Bell representing the Labor party and four Nationalist candidates. After preferences Falkiner won 7,360 to Bell's 3,964 and was declared elected on 5 June 1928. Bell spoke at Falkiner's declaration at St Kilda Town Hall, alleging that the Nationalists had spent £10,000 contesting the seat, an amount that he could not match, adding that he "could not afford to buy this seat". He also alleged irregularities in the voting roll, which he claimed contained deceased persons and that many poor had been struck off the roll. Falkiner died in May 1929 in London, creating a Legislative Council vacancy, Bell however withdrew from the election in early June 1929. The election was subsequently won by Nationalist candidate Harold Cohen.

== Melbourne & Metropolitan Tramways Board ==
Bell was appointed to the Melbourne & Metropolitan Tramways Board (MMTB) board in 1919, at time of establishment, and became deputy-chair in July 1935. In December 1935 Bell was abruptly announced as the new chairman of the MMTB, succeeding Alexander Cameron in a decision Cameron found out about by reading in a newspaper. Bell's tenure began on 1 January 1936, becoming the second chairman of the MMTB and was paid a salary of £1,750 during his entire tenure, which lasted until 1949.

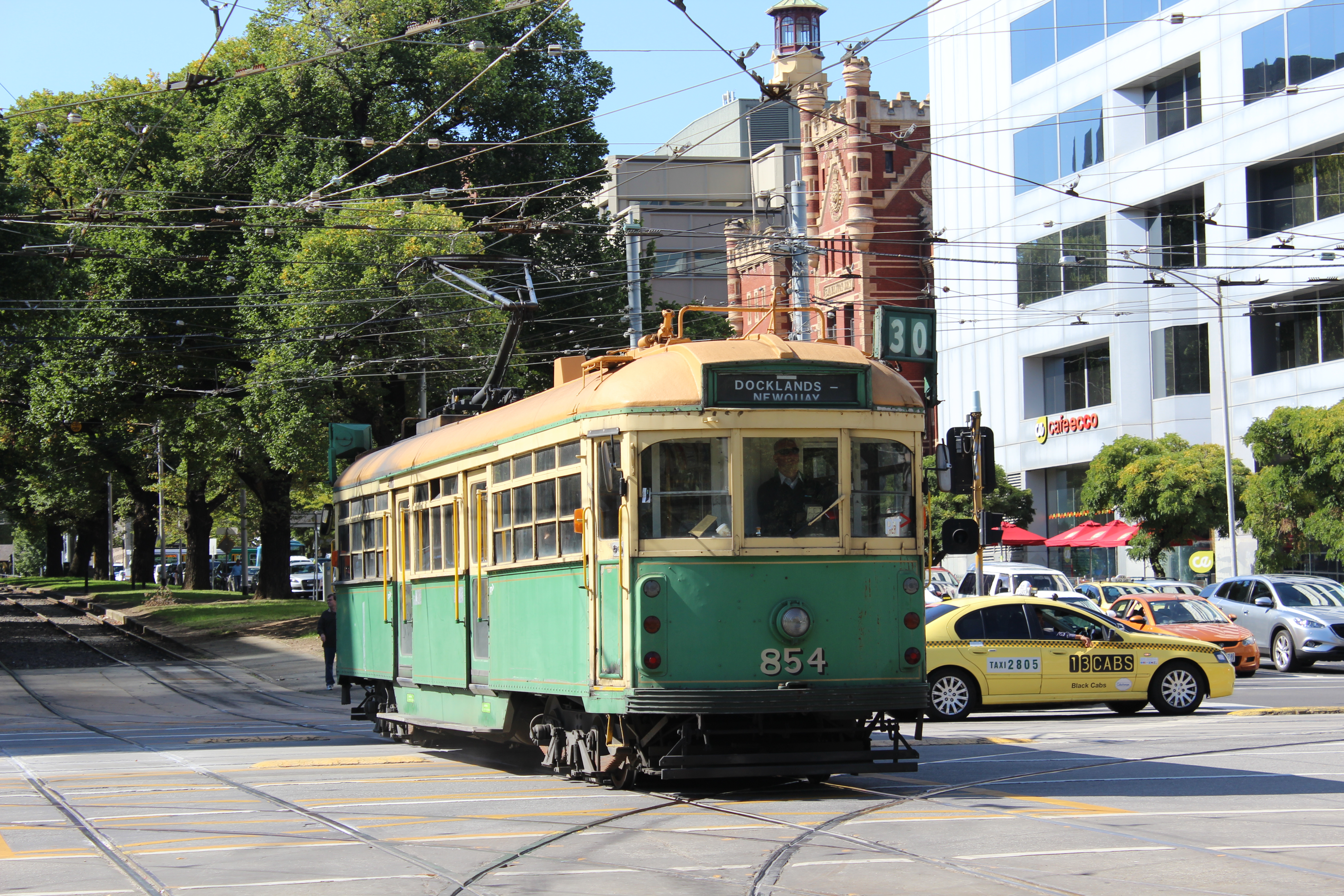
SW6 854, one of the first of 119 "luxury" trams introduced during Bell's stewardship of the MMTB, seen in Victoria Parade on route 30 in 2013

As chairman of the MMTB Bell recommenced the conversion of cable trams, introduced all-night and Sunday morning trams (to the ire of the religious community), and returned successive surpluses. The MMTB recorded year-on-year increases in surplus from 1936 to 1942 (buoyed by the war-time economy), although said surpluses were redistributed to councils, pursuant to the Melbourne and Metropolitan Tramways Act. Bell's era introduced modernised luxury SW6-class trams, which increased passenger comfort and, following a fact-finding mission to the USA in 1938, a prototype PCC tram. Under Bell, the MMTB investigated the possibility of introducing of PCC trams to Melbourne, although only one, prototype tram 980, was ever built. Also resulting from Bell's travels in the USA was a larger role for buses in the MMTB, with some cable tram routes converted to diesel bus. Although this path was not completely successful, as the Bourke Street cable tram routes, which were closed in 1940 and were the last cable tram routes, suffered with buses unable to cope with the heavy loadings; their conversion to bus was deemed unsuccessful and in 1943 the decision was made to reintroduce electric trams to Bourke Street.

During World War II, Bell offered the services of the MMTB's Preston Workshops to the war effort, offering in 1940 to build a tank for the army.

The fiscal conservatism Bell brought to the MMTB not only returned surpluses, but was also instrumental in innovation. Many surplus single truck trams were converted to one person operation for the newly introduced all night services, rather than being scrapped during 1936–37. Indeed, with more than a decade of service life remaining Bell wished to reuse assets. Bell's stewardship also saw reductions in debt owed by the MMTB, with a massive repayment made in 1949 before his retirement.

Bell's hard stance against communists led to clashes with the union. One such occurrence was in 1948, when he accused the Australian Tramway and Motor Omnibus Employees' Association's Victorian state secretary, Clarrie O'Shea of "always holding a pistol at our heads". He also believed that one quarter of the workplace were communist, and that they forced the other 75% to continue industrial actions against their wishes. In 1948 he said "if I had my way, I would sack every Communist in the Tramways service tomorrow morning". However, he was remembered somewhat fondly by union officials, when compared to his successor, Robert Risson. Indeed, in 1954 the union wished for Bell to act as arbitrator in an industrial dispute about one-person operation of buses.

In March 1949 Bell, then aged 72, announced that he would retire as chairman of the MMTB. After initially considering asking Bell to continue as chairman, a State Government committee started vetting applications in April 1949, and in June 1949 announced Risson as the incoming MMTB chairman. Bell chaired his last meeting in September 1949, with Risson succeeding him on 1 October. He was farewelled from the MMTB with gifts from the Employee's Sporting Association, and a £2,500 gratuity payment from the State Government.

Throughout Bell's tenure as chairman he was a defender of trams against buses. Bell declared that trams were superior to buses in 1936, dismissing claims that the install cost of trolleybuses was one sixth that of trams, stating that Melbourne would not follow London's lead in introducing trolleybuses. Bell saw buses as useful for operating feeder services, but believed only electric trams could provide the capacity required of a large cities public transport system, also touting electric trams quick ability at moving large football crowds. He repeatedly declared electric trams safer than buses, that they would continue to operate in Melbourne, and defended trams and their continued use from criticism from Federal Secretary of the Australian Automobile Association in The Argus. In 1948 Bell blamed the running costs of buses that were not covered by operating revenue for the MMTB making a loss, contending that if it were not for the bus losses the MMTB would have returned a profit.

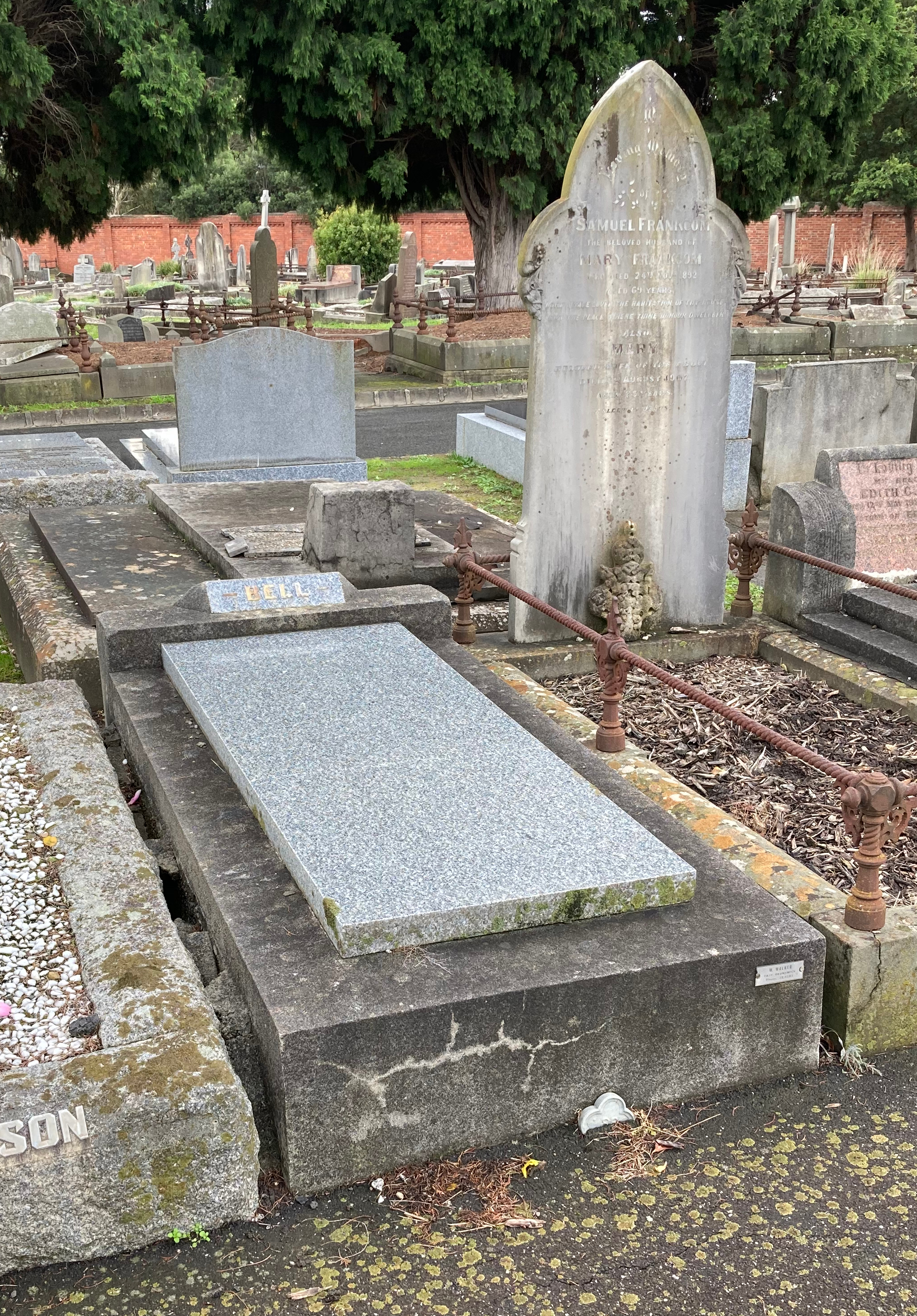
Bell's grave at Boroondara General Cemetery

Bell did however continue with ethically questionable behaviour, which is said to have tarnished his legacy. He favoured some contractors over others, including granting of bus contracts to Leyland over the technically more advanced AEC. An air-raid shelter was also built, at public expense, at his house; justified as being a conference room for board members. He also used his position to further his son's career, in 1944 appointing Bell Jr. as permanent-way engineer, with Bell Jr. quickly rising to the senior position of chief engineer of the MMTB. Bell Jr. was unqualified for these positions, and was replaced as chief engineer in late 1951.

== Later life ==
Following retirement from the MMTB Bell was made a Commander of the Most Excellent Order of the British Empire (CBE) in January 1950, for his work in the field of public transportation. Bell died in Hawthorn on 12 November 1964 and was interred in Boroondara General Cemetery, Kew. He was succeeded by his three children: two daughters and a son. Bell's estate of £21,080 in realty and £22,809 of personal wealth entered a family trust for his children.
