= Robert Risson =

Australian engineer and soldier (1901–1992)

Sir Robert Joseph Henry Risson
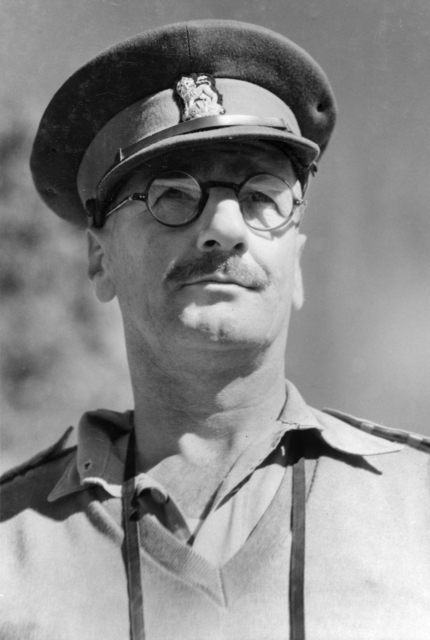
- Risson viewing a military demonstration in Queensland, 1943
- Born: 20 April 1901; Ma Ma Creek, Queensland
- Died: 19 July 1992 (aged 91); Murrumbeena, Victoria
- Military career
- Allegiance: Australia
- Branch: Citizens Military Force
- Service years: 1933–1958
- Rank: Major General
- Service number: QX6062
- Commands: 3rd Division (1953–56); 4th Infantry Brigade (1949–53); I Corps Engineers (1944–45); II Corps Engineers (1943–44); 9th Division Engineers (1942–43); 7th Division Engineers (1941–42); 2/3rd Field Company (1940–41)
- Conflicts: Second World War; Siege of Tobruk; Syria–Lebanon campaign; First Battle of El Alamein; Second Battle of El Alamein; New Guinea campaign; Borneo campaign
- Awards: Knight Bachelor; Companion of the Order of the Bath; Commander of the Order of the British Empire; Distinguished Service Order; Officer of the Order of St John; Efficiency Decoration; Mentioned in Despatches (2)
- Other work: Chairman, Melbourne and Metropolitan Tramways Board (1949–70)

Major General Sir Robert Joseph Henry Risson, CB, CBE, DSO, ED (20 April 1901 – 19 July 1992) was an Australian engineer, soldier, and tramway administrator. After university he worked for the Brisbane Tramways Trust, later under the auspice of Brisbane City Council, as an engineer and administrator. During World War II Risson served in the Middle East and New Guinea. Following the war he returned to the Brisbane tramways, and became chairman of the Melbourne and Metropolitan Tramways Board from 1949 to 1970. In this position he defended trams, and is considered a major factor in the survival of Melbourne's tram system. Risson had ties with a myriad of professional and community organisations, including the Freemasons, where he served as Grand Master of the United Grand Lodge of Victoria in the mid-1970s. Risson was decorated for his service, holding the rank of major general and being knighted.

== Early life ==
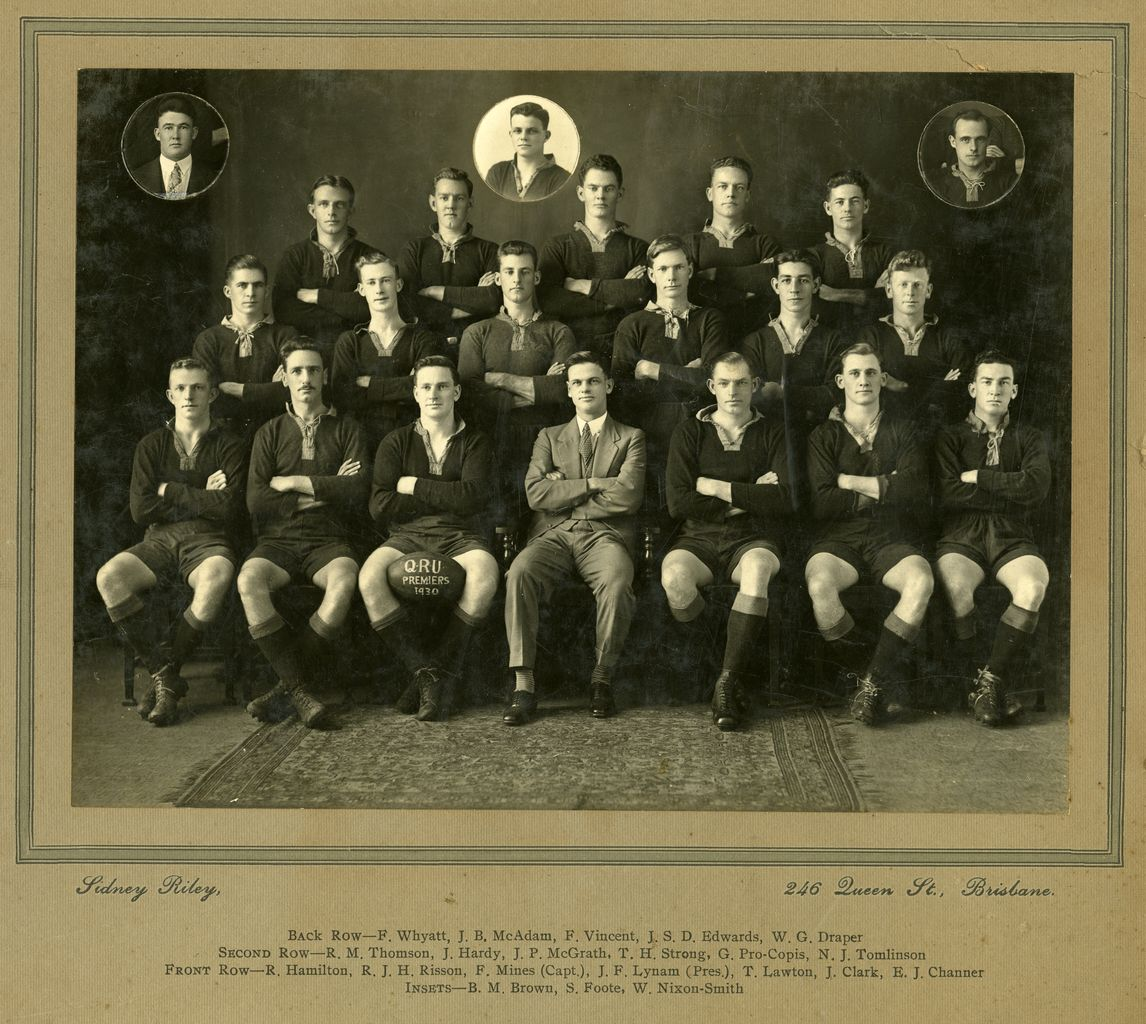
University of Queensland Rugby Club in 1930. Risson is in the front row, second from the left.

Robert Joseph Henry Risson was born on 20 April 1901 in Ma Ma Creek, Queensland. He attended Gatton State High School, passing the Senior Public Examination in November 1918, and matriculated to The University of Queensland where he studied Civil Engineering. He graduated in 1922/3 and obtained a Bachelor of Engineering (civil). At university Risson studied at King's College and participated in social events, debates, and became involved with the University of Queensland Rugby Club, becoming president by 1933.

== Brisbane Tramways Trust ==
In June 1923, Risson was employed by the Brisbane Tramways Trust as a junior civil engineer, at an annual wage of £250. Risson's duties with the Brisbane tramways were altered in 1927, following the adoption of a report by Brisbane City Council, which was in control of Brisbane's tram network at that time. In 1933, Risson assisted the Brisbane Tramways constructional engineer in overseeing track renewal in central Brisbane, and was Permanent Way Engineer by 1939.

Risson saw active service during World War II, but returned to work with the Brisbane Tramways following the war. He worked within Brisbane City Council's Transport Department and rose to Assistant General Manager. During late 1948, Risson was Acting General Manager. Brisbane's tramways undertook an expansion and modernisation program following World War II, introducing modern vehicles and utilising mass-concrete tram track construction methods.

Following Risson's departure to Melbourne to head the Melbourne and Metropolitan Tramways Board, it took Brisbane City Council three years to find a replacement. G.A. Preston, an engineer, was announced as Risson's successor in February 1953, and was subsequently elevated to general manager from 1 January 1954, a position to which "Risson was considered the logical successor".

== Military career ==
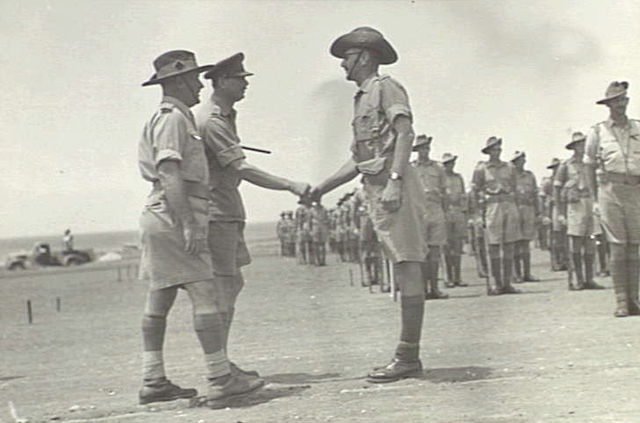
Prince Henry, Duke of Gloucester shakes hands with Lieutenant Colonel Risson, before inspecting the 9th Division, engineers, Tripoli, Syria, 1942.

Risson's military career started on 15 May 1933, when he was commissioned as a lieutenant in the Australian Engineers, which became the Royal Australian Engineers in 1936. He was promoted to captain on 7 September 1936. On 13 October 1939, following the outbreak of the Second World War, Risson enlisted in the Second Australian Imperial Force (AIF), with the rank of major, receiving the AIF service number QX6062.

Risson was sent to the Middle East, where he commanded the 2/3rd Field Company, and then the 7th Division Engineers from 29 May 1941 to 23 January 1942, engaging in the 1941 Siege of Tobruk, where he played a vital role in improving defences, and then in the Syria–Lebanon campaign. On 24 January 1942 he assumed command of the 9th Division Engineers, which he led in the First Battle of El Alamein and the Second Battle of El Alamein. After the 9th Division returned home in 1943, he was promoted to brigadier on 23 March 1943, and became Chief Engineer of II Corps, participating in the New Guinea campaign. He became Chief Engineer of I Corps on 12 April 1944, when the corps number changed. He was temporarily attached to Allied Land Forces Headquarters (LHQ) from 21 May 1944 to 1 July 1944, but returned to command the engineers in the 1945 Borneo campaign.

While Risson was overseas, Gwen also participated in the war effort, commanding Brisbane's Women's Air Training Corps in 1940. She stated the goal was for women to do the jobs of men on the ground, "releas[ing] them for actual flying." She was sent to Melbourne for administrative training in 1941.

Risson continued his military career after the Second World War with the Citizen Military Forces (CMF), commanding the 4th Infantry Brigade. In July 1953 he was promoted to the rank of major general, and appointed General Officer Commanding the 3rd Division. He held that post until 1956, and served as the CMF Member of the Military Board from 1957 to 1958.

=== Awards ===
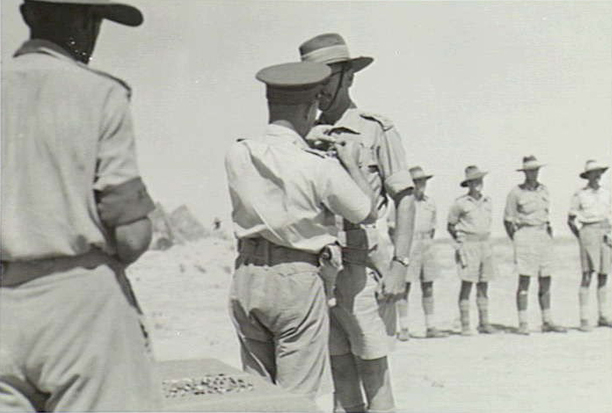
Lieutenant General Sir Leslie Morshead pinning the OBE ribbon on Lieutenant Colonel Risson, El Alamein, 1942.

Risson was decorated five times for his service during the Second World War. He received a Distinguished Service Order in 1943, alongside 28 other members of the 9th Division also honoured, for their role at El Alamein; was made an Officer of the Order of the British Empire (OBE) in 1942 for his role in the Siege of Tobruk, and a Commander of the Order of the British Empire in 1945 for his work in New Guinea; and was Mentioned in Despatches in 1941 and 1943 for actions in Syria and El Alamein, respectively. Risson was also awarded the Efficiency Decoration.

== Melbourne and Metropolitan Tramways Board ==
Following Hector Hercules Bell's decision in 1949 to retire as Melbourne and Metropolitan Tramways Board chairman, the State Government of Victoria, in April 1949, empowered a committee to start vetting applications for his replacement. Risson was announced as the incoming MMTB chairman in June 1949, assuming the role on 1 October, and becoming the MMTB's third chairman. He was initially paid £2,500 per year.

Risson made operational changes to the MMTB Throughout the 1950s. He introduced operating efficiencies, with his military training influencing his managerial style. Bell's promised PCC tram began operation in 1950, but remained a one-off, with more W-class trams being built instead, the last entering service in 1956. Risson's reopening of Bourke St trams, with the justification of economic advantage, is lauded as his greatest achievement. Risson also made use of migration agreements to bolster low employee numbers, even purchasing dwellings to house new arrivals.

Risson's era saw ongoing industrial disputes, regarding pay, bus operation (following one protracted industrial dispute, the Arbitration Commission ruled that there be two-person operation of 31+ seat buses), and even the implementation of a summer uniform. There were also cuts to all-night and Sunday tram services, and the abandonment of the Point Ormond line, and Footscray system. These cuts were part of Risson's economy drive, justified by low patronage and a need to decrease costs.

=== Legacy ===
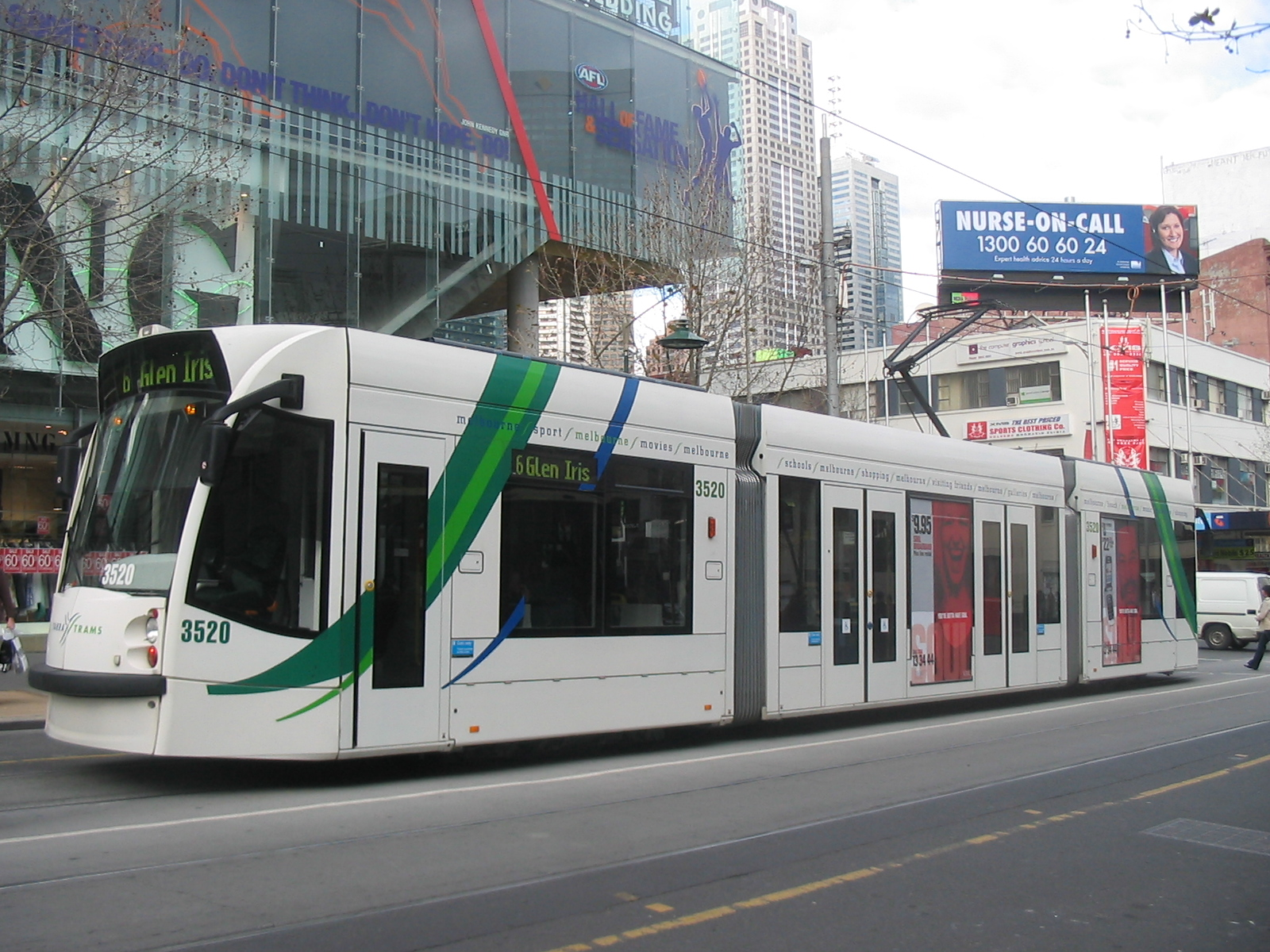
A D-class Melbourne tram on Melbourne's Swanston Street

Risson was a defender of trams at a time when they were falling out of favour across Australia. He is often regarded as a major factor in the retention of Melbourne's tram network, which now has a route length of 250 km (155 mi), making it the largest tram network in the world. Academic Graeme Turnbull argues that "the retention of the Melbourne tramway system during this period is due almost solely to Sir Robert's strong management", and academic John Legge writes that "Melbourne's tram network in the years after the war found that Risson still knew how to fight. Premiers as tough as Henry Bolte backed away from such a contest." Further, Victorian Transport Minister Alan Brown called Risson "the man who deserves full credit for saving our city's trams" in 1994, and columnist Bruce Guthrie described Risson as "the man who saved our trams."

To honour Risson's legacy the tram terminus in Elizabeth Street was named after him by Brown in 1994. The first D1-class tram (number 3501), officially launched on 2 August 2002, was fitted with plaques near the front doors stating that it had been "named in honour of Sir Robert J.H. Risson...", but they were removed when the tram was re-decorated in PTV livery in June 2014.

== Public service ==
Risson participated in a variety of organisations through his life. Risson became a Freemason in 1961, holding a number of positions including as Grand Master of the United Grand Lodge of Victoria between 1974 and 1976. He was a fellow of the Institution of Civil Engineers; Institution of Engineers of Australia; Australian Institute of Management; and a member of the Institute of Transport. Further, he was Chief Commissioner of the Australian Boy Scouts Association from 1958 to 1963; President of the Good Neighbour Council from 1963 to 1968; Chairman of the National Fitness Council from 1961 to 1971; and inaugural chair of the Duke of Edinburgh's Award in 1963. Risson died on 19 July 1992 in Murrumbeena, Victoria.

=== Honours ===
In addition to his honours during active service in the Second World War, Risson was made an Officer of the Order of St John, a Companion of the Order of the Bath in 1958, and was conferred the honour of Knight Bachelor during the Queen's Birthday ceremonies in 1970.

== Personal life ==
After a three-and-a-half-year engagement, Risson married Gwendolyn Edith Millicent Spurgin on 12 May 1934 at St John’s Church of England Cathedral, Brisbane. The couple honeymooned in Melbourne.

During the 1920s Gwendolyn had attended The University of Queensland, where she played hockey representing both the University and Australia. She later coached the University of Queensland Women's Hockey Club.

The Rissons did not have children. Gwendolyn died on 9 September 1988.

== See also ==
- Alexander Cameron – inaugural chairman of the MMTB, who presided from 1919 to 1935

Military offices
Preceded by Major General Selwyn Porter	General Officer Commanding 3rd Division; 1953–1956	Succeeded by Major General Heathcote Hammer
Masonic offices
Preceded by Clive Harris	Grand Master of the United Grand Lodge of Victoria; 1974–1976	Succeeded by Christopher James
