= Dudley Snell =

Australian tramway administrator

- Born: Frederick Dudley Snell; 14 December 1924; Eaglehawk, Victoria, Australia
- Died: 14 December 1988 (aged 64); Hong Kong
- Occupations: Engineer; Tramways administrator
- Known for: Melbourne & Metropolitan Tramways Board Chairman (1970–1976)

Frederick Dudley Snell (14 December 1924 – 14 December 1988) was an Australian electrical engineer and tramways administrator. He grew up in Bendigo and following his education worked for the State Electricity Commission of Victoria. After serving in the Royal Australian Air Force during World War II, he commenced work at the Melbourne & Metropolitan Tramways Board (MMTB) in 1953, being appointed the MMTB's fifth and last Chairman in 1976. Following the dissolving of the MMTB into the Metropolitan Transit Authority (MTA) in 1983, he became General Manager of the MTA Bus and Tram Division. Snell worked for the MMTB, MTA, and Leighton Asia on Hong Kong's Tuen Mun light rail system, and died in Hong Kong in 1988.

== Early life ==
Frederick Dudley Snell was born in Eaglehawk, Victoria on 14 December 1924. He was educated at Eaglehawk State School and later attended the Bendigo School of Mines where he attained a Diploma of Electrical Engineering. In 1940 Snell commenced a cadetship with the State Electricity Commission of Victoria (SEC). During World War II, he served with the Royal Australian Air Force, primarily in New Guinea. On 4 December 1948 he married Joan Buckie, with whom he had two daughters.

== Melbourne and Metropolitan Tramways Board ==
In 1953, Snell left the SEC, and moved to the Melbourne & Metropolitan Tramways Board (MMTB) as an electrical engineer. He was promoted to Methods Engineer, and was appointed Chief Engineer in 1969. In 1970, he became the MMTB's Deputy Chairman under Francis Kirby. He succeeded Kirby as Chairman in 1976 for a five-year term, which was renewed in 1981.

As Chairman of the MMTB, Snell faced the same financial challenges as Kirby, but nonetheless managed some reforms. New ticketing systems, which arrested patronage declines by making public transport more cost effective, were implemented under his administration. Additional Z-class trams and new Volvo B59 and MAN SL200 buses were ordered, and he raised the introduction of trolley buses.

Snell's era saw the first tramline extensions since 1956, with an extension from East Burwood to Middleborough Road opening on 23 July 1978, and from East Preston to Boldrewood Parade opening on 19 May 1983. However, the little-used Holden Street line was abandoned. Despite the reforms, the MMTB remained in a poor financial situation, and a shift from purchasing to leasing buses later become a financial liability for the Cain Labor government.

Snell was critical to the MMTB's successful involvement in the construction and operation of Hong Kong's Tuen Mun light rail systems.

He was dismissive of concepts for low-floor trams in the early 1980s, and the MMTB ordered new B-class high-floor trams that were non-compliant with subsequent accessibility legislation. Low-floor trams were finally introduced in Melbourne in 2001.

== Metropolitan Transit Authority ==
Public transport in Victoria was reorganised on 1 July 1983, with Melbourne's railway services and MMTB tram and bus services amalgamated into the Metropolitan Transit Authority (MTA), leaving Snell the MMTB's final chairman. Snell continued working with the Melbourne tramway system, as General Manager of the MTA's Bus and Tram Division, also managing the MTA's interests in the Tuen Mun light rail system.

== Hong Kong light rail ==
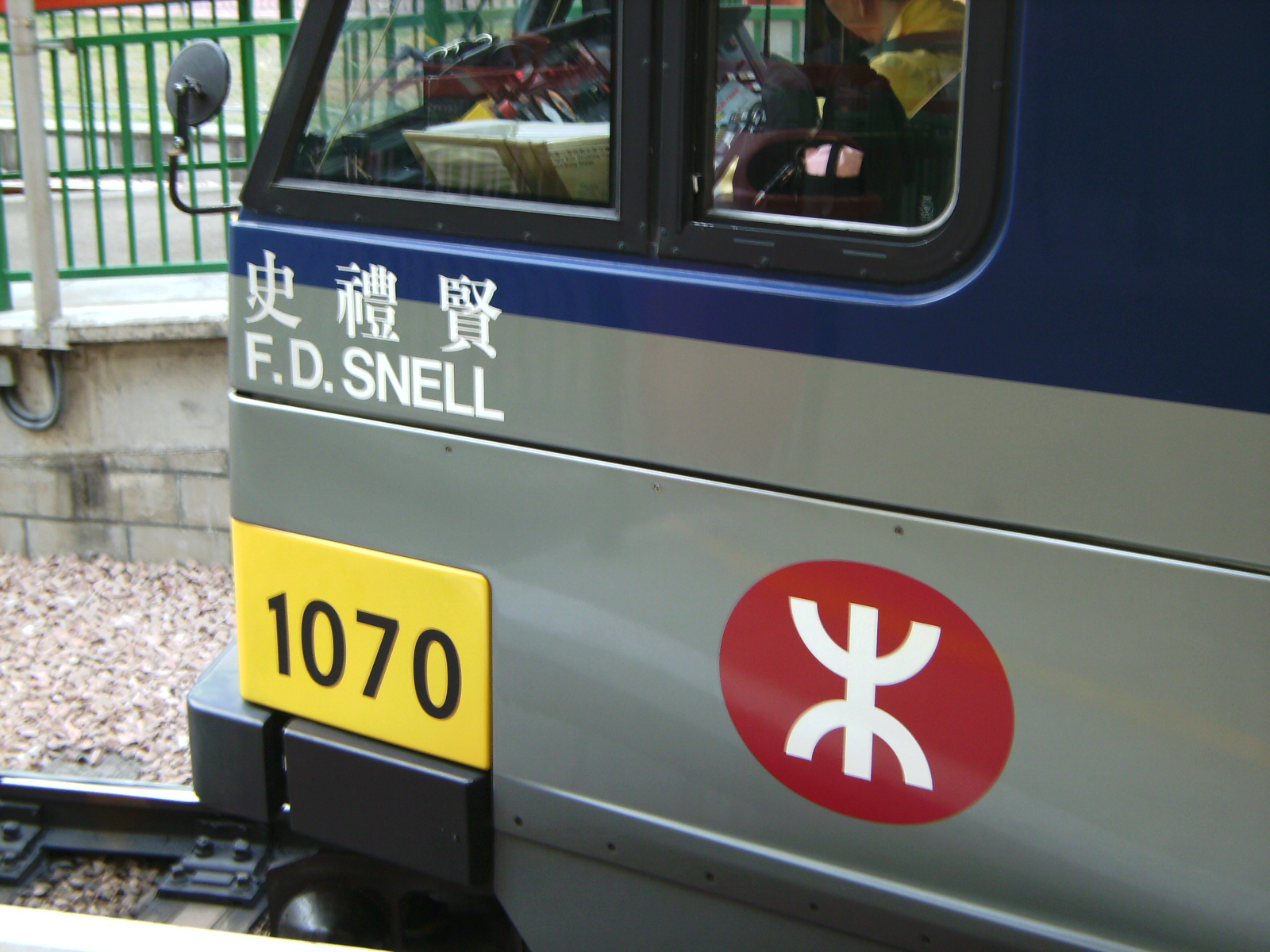
Comeng built Hong Kong light rail vehicle 1070, named in honour of Snell

Snell retired from the MTA in 1985 and relocated to Hong Kong to work for Leighton Asia, who were involved in consortium with the MTA, becoming project manager of the Hong Kong light rail. The light rail opened in September 1988, with Snell commenting that opening day was "packed in true Hong Kong style".

Snell died in Hong Kong on 14 December 1988. He was survived by his wife Joan and their two daughters.

== Organisational involvement ==
Snell was on the Management Committee of the International Union of Public Transport (UIPT), the first Australian representative, and was founding member of the UIPT Light Rail Commission. In this capacity, he aided in the creation of Light Rail Transit standards, and was one of a group of three Members of the Commission who presented at the UITP 46th International Congress in Brussels in May 1985. Snell's work in advocating for light rail saw him elected as the Honorary Vice President of the Light Rail Transit Association of the UK.

Along with his Diploma of Electrical Engineering, he was a graduate of the Australian Administrative Staff College, and held professional affiliations as a member of The Institution of Engineers Australia, and a fellow of The Chartered Institute of Transport. He served as vice-chairman of the general committee of the latter institute for eight years. He was also involved in Rotary International from 1978, being active in Melbourne Rotary and in the Welfare of the Young Committee.
