= Alexander Cameron (tramways administrator) =

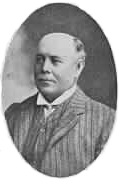
- Alexander Cameron in 1908
- Born: 5 August 1864; Hamilton, Victoria
- Died: 23 February 1940 (aged 75); South Yarra, Victoria
- Occupations: Lawyer local councillor tramways administrator

Alexander Cameron (5 August 1864 – 23 February 1940) was a lawyer, local councillor, and tramways administrator. Following university education he established a legal practice, and later ran for, and won, election on Town of Malvern council. In this position he advocated for the establishment of a local tramway system, and became the inaugural chairman of the Prahran & Malvern Tramways Trust. In 1919 he was appointed as the inaugural chairman of the newly established Melbourne & Metropolitan Tramways Board and presided in that capacity until 1935, creating a unified tram network from the disparate systems that were hitherto operating in Melbourne. He was recognised as a transport expert from his years of experience managing and expanding tramways of Melbourne.

== Early life ==
Alexander Cameron was born on 5 August 1864, along with a twin brother, on a sheep station near Hamilton, Victoria to John Cameron and his wife Barbara Winifred (née Taylor). He attended Hamilton College and then studied law at the University of Melbourne. In 1881 he was articled to Charles James Cresswell in Hamilton, and from 1885 to David Houston Herald in Melbourne, being admitted as a barrister and solicitor on 1 September 1886. Following overseas travel, Cameron established a legal practice with Samuel Crisp in Melbourne in 1889.

Cameron married Mary Wright on 29 June 1892 in the Toorak Presbyterian Church, with the two subsequently living in Malvern. The two had a son who died in infancy.

== Town of Malvern ==
Cameron's candidature for Town of Malvern's South Ward was announced on 5 July 1902, a position he subsequently won on 28 August 1902. Following election, he was appointed Malvern's delegate to the Melbourne and Metropolitan Board of Works; an appointment which was consistent with his interests in building regulations. He also advocated for public transport, as Malvern had poor public transport access and the Melbourne Tramway & Omnibus Company's cable tram system did not serve the municipality. He advocated for electric trams, but was opposed by the Victorian Railways which feared the tramways would reduce their patronage. This fight was won when the Prahran & Malvern Tramways Trust Act 1907 (no. 2130) was passed, authorising the establishment of the Prahran & Malvern Tramways Trust (PMTT), and the construction of an electric tramway to connect Malvern and Prahran. This was a feat largely due to Cameron's legal acumen, and followed a recent precedent of suburban tramways in Melbourne, with the privately operated North Melbourne Electric Tramway and Lighting Company commencing operation in 1906.

== Prahran and Malvern Tramways Trust ==
Cameron was selected to be the inaugural chairman of the PMTT in March 1908 when meetings of Prahran Council and Malvern Council, on the recommendation of Malvern Council, carried a motion supporting his appointment. To become chairman he resigned his seat on Malvern council. Cameron's tenure was extended by unanimous vote of the PMTT's municipalities in February 1914.

Construction was authorised in July 1908, and began on the first two routes on 20 October 1909, with both lines opening to the public on 30 May 1910, operated by 13 trams. Under Cameron the PMTT grew rapidly, with lines extended, new lines opened, and many new trams purchased or constructed by the PMTT. Ultimately the PMTT became the largest electric tramway system in Melbourne, eclipsing the Victorian Railways' trams, North Melbourne Electric Tramway and Lighting Company, Hawthorn Tramway Trust, and Melbourne, Brunswick & Coburg Tramways Trust. By 1920, when the PMTT was absorbed into the Melbourne & Metropolitan Tramways Board (MMTB) the PMTT had sixteen lines; 94 operational trams; and served passengers in multiple suburbs beyond Prahran and Malvern, including Camberwell, Caulfield, Caulfield South, Point Ormond, Glen Huntly, Hawthorn, Kew, Kew East, Mont Albert, St Kilda, and Victoria Bridge (Richmond). Much of the growth and success of the PMTT is attributed to Cameron, who became a "recognized (sic) authority on the subject of passenger transport".

== Melbourne and Metropolitan Tramways Board ==
In 1919 the Victorian Government formed the MMTB to take control of the Cable Tramway Board and the Royal Park Horse Tramway, with the intention of amalgamating Melbourne's tram systems (except the Victorian Railways' trams) into a single entity. Cameron was appointed the inaugural Chairman of the MMTB in July 1919, resigning his position on the PMTT on 31 October 1919 for the appointment. He was thanked for his service with the gift of a leather smokeroom chair, and HS Dix was selected to serve the remainder of Cameron's term.

The MMTB was enlarged on 2 February 1920 when it absorbed the PMTT, Hawthorn Tramway Trust, Melbourne, Brunswick and Coburg Tramways Trust, Northcote Municipality Cable Tramways, and the Fitzroy, Northcote & Preston Tramways Trust and Footscray Tramway Trust which were both under construction, but not yet operational. The North Melbourne Electric Tramway and Lighting Company was later acquired by the Victorian Government, with the tramway component transferred to the MMTB on 21 December 1922, bringing all Melbourne's tram systems, except the Victorian Railways' trams, under the control of the MMTB. These disparate systems had all been constructed with varying standards and were not interconnected, under Cameron, the MMTB began uniting the system.

Cameron travelled to continental Europe, the United Kingdom, and the United States in March 1923, investigating foreign operating procedures and innovations. He returned the next year, steadfast in his belief that trams were superior to buses and that overhead wires were more cost effective than conduit electric collection systems; confirming the view regarding conduit collection he held before his travels. Under Cameron's direction, the MMTB also created a General Scheme for the future development of Melbourne's trams, including new lines, extensions to existing lines, and the abandonment or conversion to electric traction of the cable tram system. Cameron's plan for electrification of the cable system saw resistance from City of Melbourne, Collins Street churches, and town planning groups, who complained that electric trams were noisy, would hold up traffic, and that the electric wires and poles were an eyesore.

Under Cameron, the MMTB soon opened the Fitzroy, Northcote & Preston Tramways Trust and Footscray Tramway Trust lines, constructed a new link connecting the northern electric lines, built the Preston Workshops, and commenced construction of the now iconic W class trams. Conversion of the cable tram system was started in 1924, with most converted by the 1930s, although the depression slowed the rate of conversions, and last lines were finally closed in 1940. Administratively, the entire tram system was running as a single entity by 1925. Cameron also fostered development of Wattle Park, which had been inherited from Hawthorn Tramways Trust, expanding the park's facilities.

Cameron's tenacity and leadership capabilities saw the MMTB massively expand, while remaining financially profitable. Twenty routes were either opened or extended under Cameron, and he is credited with building tram lines in largely unpopulated areas where future development was anticipated, creating a network that "thickly populated" Melbourne's suburbs. He vertically integrated the MMTB, bringing tramcar construction and maintenance, and tramway construction in-house. This astute management saw the MMTB have balanced books, with the exception of the first four years, with large amounts made available for infrastructure investment. He was sometimes, however, somewhat risky with financial decisions, opting to rely heavily on debt spending.

Notwithstanding Cameron's preference for trams over buses, impassioned defence of trams' economic advantage over buses, and feelings that buses could not provide the same level of service as trams, he still saw them as useful for cross city routes and connecting to existing tram termini and the MMTB commenced operation of bus services on 3 January 1925. The first route competed with a private operator, with Cameron stating it would match price and travel time of the existing operator. Buses were also used as replacements for cable trams while they were being converted to electric traction, with the fleet quickly growing to 56 buses by mid-1926. However, by 1931 the MMTB ran almost no bus services, operating solely a tourist bus from 1932 to 1934, with the MMTB recommencing major bus operations in 1935/36 with the conversion of Elizabeth Street's cable trams and permits for new services being issued.

Cameron's five-year term as chairman of the MMTB was repeatedly extended, postponing a review of the boards structure. On 18 December 1935 the Victorian Government announced Cameron's retirement, with Cameron not being notified, instead reading of the decision in the newspaper. This move was objected to by other members of the board, who "protested at the grave discourtesy shown to him" and "paid tribute to him when he chaired his last meeting on 19 December." He was succeeded by Hector Hercules Bell who had been on the MMTB board since inception in 1919, and deputy chairman since July 1935.

== Legacy ==
Cameron has been praised for his involvement in both the PMTT and MMTB, and in tramway development in Melbourne more generally. Following his appointment to the chair of the MMTB, he was reported in 1920 to have had "special knowledge and great abilities" which made him "the only one man in sight" for appointment as chair of the PMTT, and that for the position of MMTB Chair "there was no hesitation in appointing Mr Cameron. It was his right by the qualities of administration he had shown." Cameron has been referred to as "the Board's first chairman who was regarded as the father of the electric tramways in Melbourne" and the "one person who should be awarded the credit for the creation and development of Melbourne's electric tramway system". Brunswick tram depot, which was built in 1935, has an adjacent street named Cameron Street in his honour.

== Personal life ==
Cameron was a member of multiple organisations, including the Institute of Transport, London, the Clan Cameron Association of Victoria (of which he was president), the Melbourne Scots, the Rotary Club, and the Yorick Club. His associates knew him as "a golfer, fisherman, 'bridge-maestro', raconteur and philosopher." He was also "known for his friendliness, and his enthusiastic dedication to his work" and was "well read in the works of Virgil, Horace, Washington Irving, Emerson and others." Cameron died in South Yarra on 23 February 1940 from cancer and was survived by his wife, Mary Wright.
