= Melbourne & Metropolitan Tramways Board =

Government-owned authority in Victoria, Australia

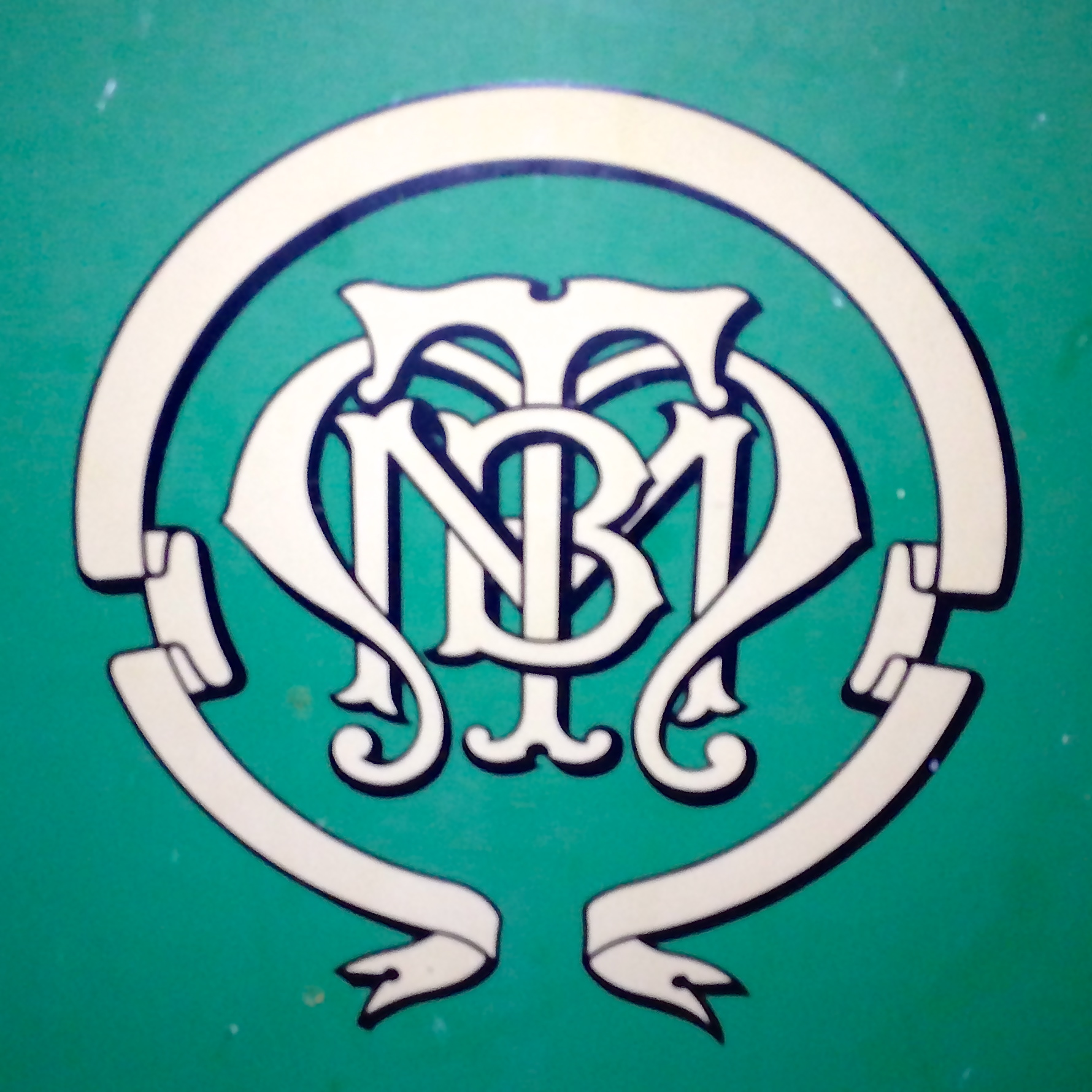
- Emblem of Melbourne & Metropolitan Tramways Board

statutory authority overview
- Formed: 1 November 1919
- Preceding statutory authority: Fitzroy, Northcote & Preston Tramways Trust Footscray Tramway Trust Hawthorn Tramways Trust Melbourne, Brunswick & Coburg Tramways Trust Northcote Municipality Cable Tramways. Prahran & Malvern Tramways Trust
- Dissolved: 30 June 1983
- Superseding statutory authority: Metropolitan Transit Authority
- Jurisdiction: Victoria
- Headquarters: Melbourne

The Melbourne & Metropolitan Tramways Board (MMTB) was a government-owned authority that was responsible for the tram network in Melbourne, Australia between 1919 and 1983, when it was merged into the Metropolitan Transit Authority. It had been formed by the merger of a number of smaller tramway trusts and companies that operated throughout the city.

== History ==
In 1869, Francis Boardman Clapp set up the Melbourne Omnibus Company (MOC) which ran horse-drawn omnibuses in the inner suburbs of Melbourne. The company carried five million passengers. By 1882 the company had over 1,600 horses and 178 omnibuses. In 1885 the company carried 11.7 million passengers.

In 1885, Clapp's MOC was granted a 30-year exclusive franchise for a cable tram network in Melbourne, with no competing lines being permitted. Clapp reorganised the company as the Melbourne Tramway & Omnibus Company (MTOC). A total of 15 lines were built, opening progressively between 1885 and 1919.

The first serious electric trams in Melbourne began in 1906, when the North Melbourne Electric Tramway & Lighting Company commenced operating an electric tram line from the terminus of the cable tram to Essendon, the motivation being the selling of electricity to customers along the route.

In the 1900s and 1910s, the government legislated for the formation of suburban electric tramway trusts to build and operate electric trams outside MTOC's exclusive licence area. These were:

- Prahran & Malvern Tramways Trust
- Hawthorn Tramways Trust
- Melbourne, Brunswick & Coburg Tramways Trust
- Fitzroy, Northcote & Preston Tramways Trust
- Footscray Tramway Trust
- Northcote Municipality Cable Tramways

When the MTOC franchise expired on 30 June 1916, the entire operation of the Melbourne cable tramway system passed to the state government. The MMTB was formed in November 1919 to take over the street tramways systems in Melbourne. It had the responsibility of operating all tramways within a ten-mile (sixteen kilometre) radius of the Melbourne GPO, the only exceptions being the lines operated by Victorian Railways.

In January 1925, the M&MTB began operating buses.

The MMTB ceased on 30 June 1983 with its function taken over by the Metropolitan Transit Authority.

=== Takeover of tramways network ===
The MMTB commenced operations on 1 November 1919, taking over the cable tram network with 44 route miles of track, 539 grips cars, 485 four wheel trailer cars, 58 double bogie trailers, 11 engine sheds and 15 carriage sheds. On 2 February 1920, it took over the six suburban electric tramway trusts, which were dissolved later that month. The MMTB also succeeded the Cable Tramway Board and the Royal Park Horse Tramway.

The MMTB took over the North Melbourne Electric Tramway & Lighting Company's tramways operation on 1 August 1922, and its lighting undertakings on 21 December 1922.

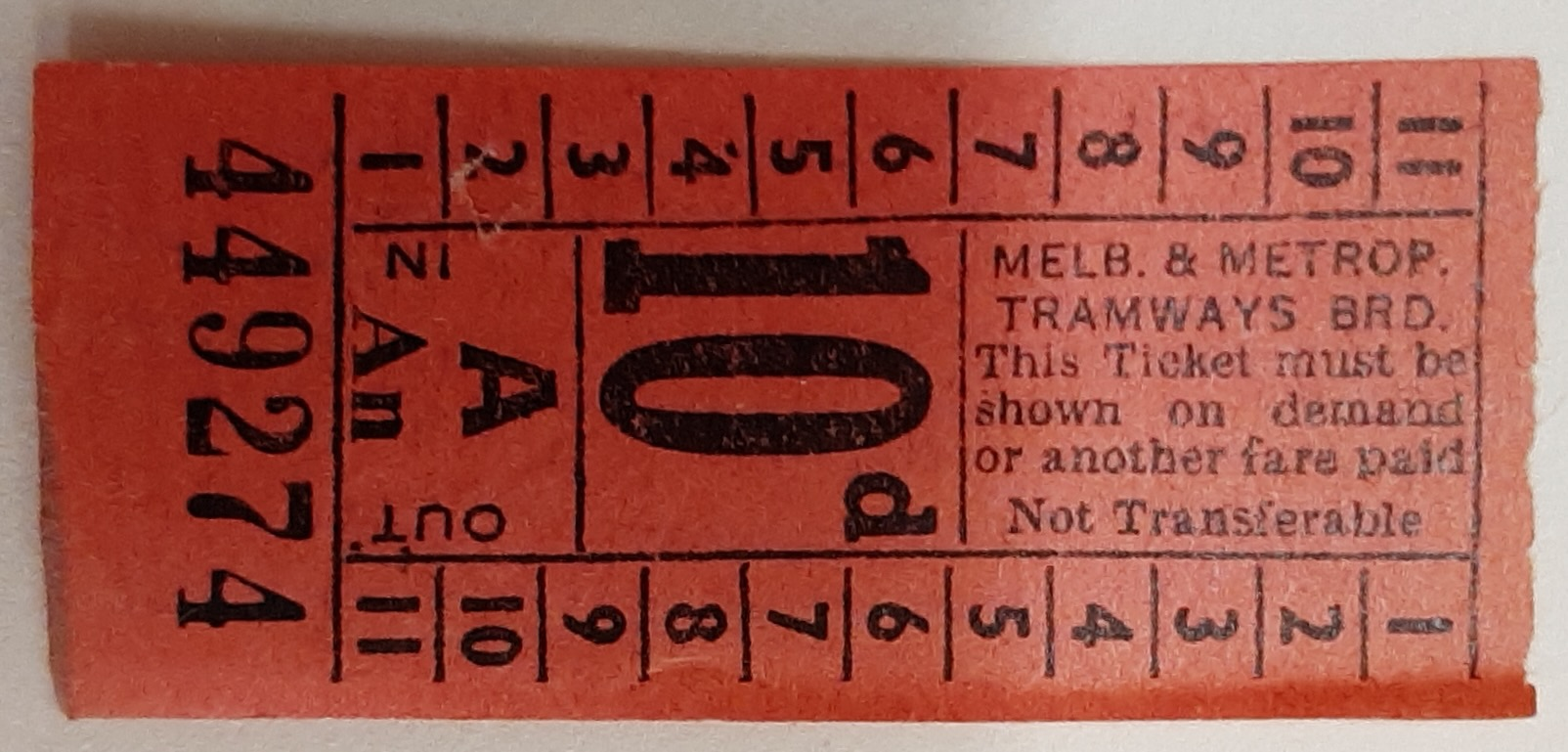
Tenpence tram ticket

=== Conversion of cable system ===
One of the MMTB's original purposes was to decide whether or not to keep the cable trams. The MMTB progressively converted cable tram lines to either electric trams or motor buses, commencing in 1924, with the last Melbourne cable tram ceasing operation on 26 October 1940.

Most of the cable tram system was converted to electric tramways (such as the tram lines along Swanston Street and Elizabeth Street), but the routes to West Melbourne (along Spencer Street to the current route 57), Port Melbourne (the original line on-street, not the current light rail line), Collingwood (along Johnston Street from Lygon Street to Johnston Street Bridge) and Carlton North (a branch off the Johnston Street line along Rathdowne Street to the end of it near the Inner Circle Line), along with the Lonsdale Street line in the city and other short sections were converted to motor buses. Trams would only ever return to the Bourke Street lines and La Trobe Street lines in the 1950s.

== Organisation ==
The MMTB was established under the Melbourne and Metropolitan Tramways Act 1918 (No. 2995). The seven members of the board, including a chairman and a deputy chairman, were appointed by an order of the Governor-in-Council dated 22 July 1919. The inaugural chairman was Alexander Cameron who had been chairman of the Prahran & Malvern Tramways Trust.

The MMTB was an independent statutory body which reported to the Minister of Public Works until 1952 and subsequently to the Minister of Transport.

== Chairmen ==
Five people held the role of MMTB chairman from 1919 when the MMTB was established to 1983 when it was absorbed by the Metropolitan Transit Authority.

- Alexander Cameron – 1919 to 1935.
- Hector Hercules Bell – 1936 to 1949.
- Robert Risson – 1949 to 1970.
- Francis Kirby – 1970 to 1976.
- Dudley Snell – 1976 to 1983.

== Depots ==
The MMTB's main maintenance facility was Preston Workshops, with depots at Brunswick, Camberwell, Coburg, East Preston, Essendon, Footscray, Glenhuntly, Hawthorn, Kew, Malvern, North Fitzroy, South Melbourne and Thornbury.

Preceded by Various operators	Trams in Melbourne; 1919–1983	Succeeded by Metropolitan Transit Authority
