= Acland Street tram stop =

Tram stop in Melbourne, Australia

Acland Street Terminus
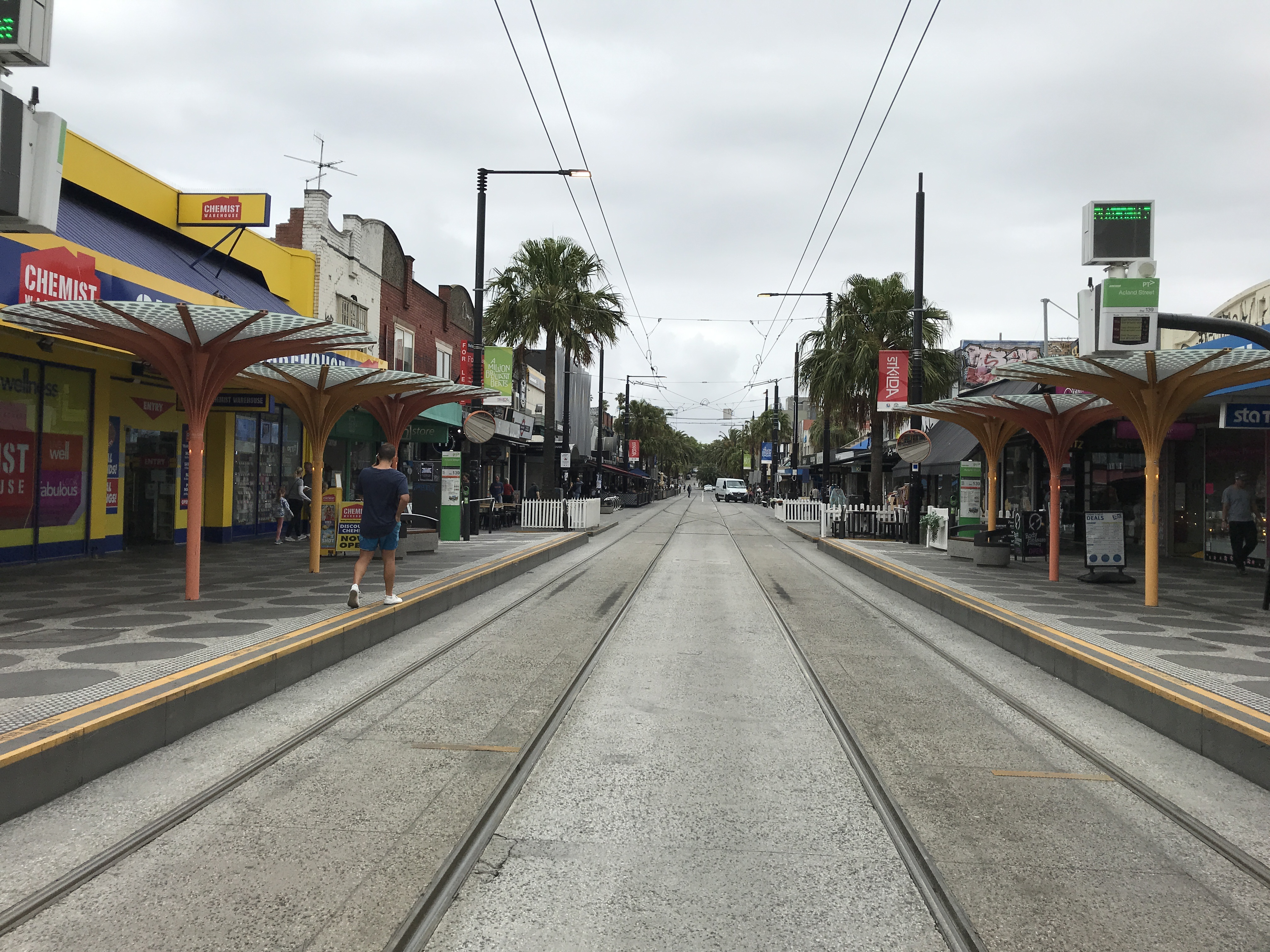
- Northbound view from the terminus, January 2020

General information
- Location: Acland Street, St Kilda, Melbourne, Victoria
- Owner: VicTrack
- Operator: Yarra Trams
- Platforms: 2
- Tracks: 2
- Connections: Bus

Construction
- Structure type: At-grade

Other information
- Status: Open
- Fare zone: Myki zone 1

History
- Opened: 17 October 1891
- Rebuilt: December 1925; 11 November 2016
- Electrified: December 1925

Services
Preceding station	Yarra Trams	Following station
Luna Park/The Esplanade towards East Brunswick	Route 96	Terminus
Former services
Preceding station	Yarra Trams	Following station
Luna Park/The Esplanade towards Melbourne University	Route 16 (-2004)	Terminus
Location

The Acland Street Terminus the southern terminus on tram Route 96 in Melbourne. The stop opened in October 1891 as part of a new cable tram line running from St Kilda to Windsor, with electric trams provided in 1925 and the current terminus provided in 2016.

== History ==
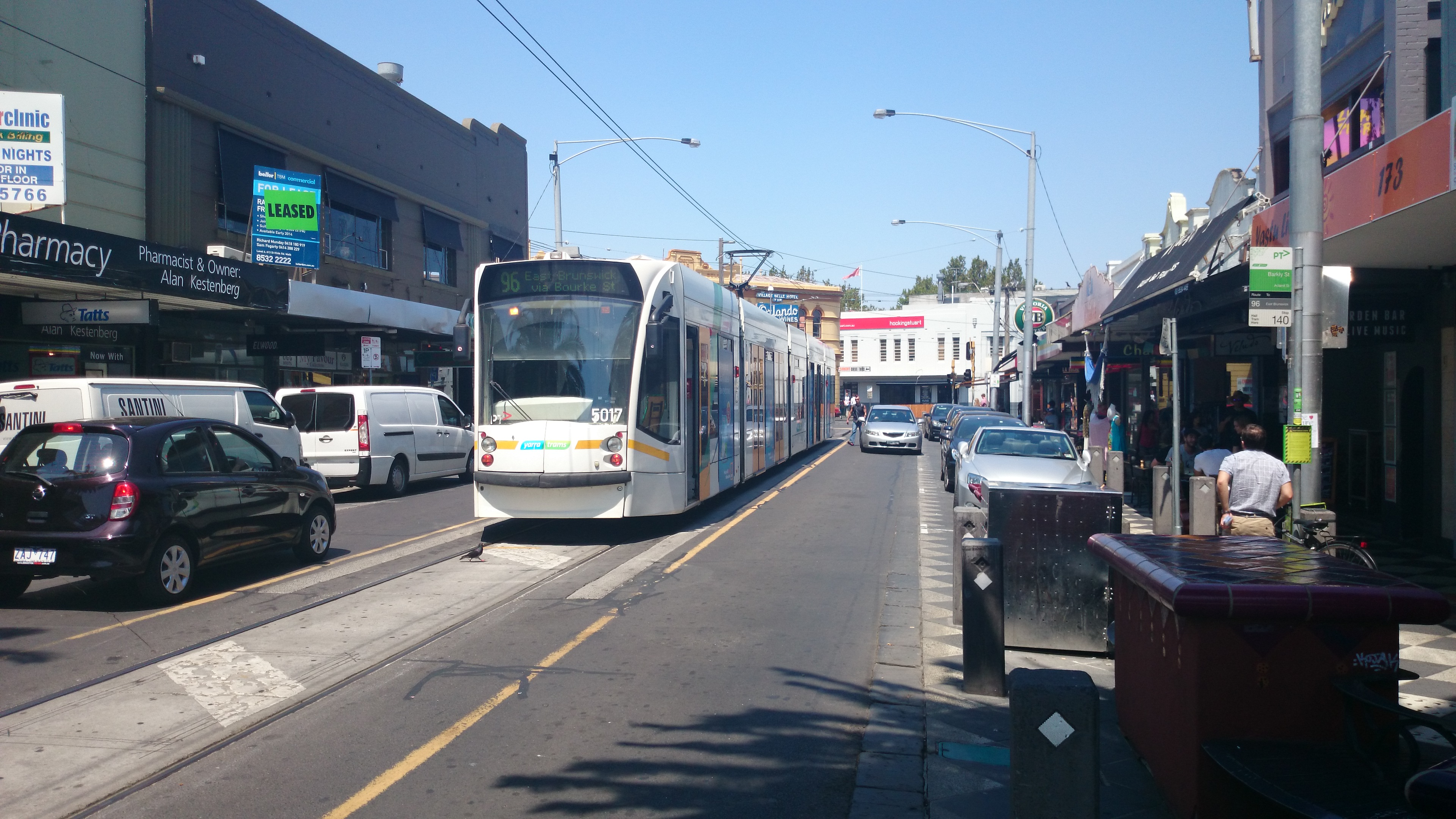
The old tram terminus as viewed in 2014

The first tram line to run through Acland Street was a cable tramway that had opened between St Kilda and Windsor on 17 October 1891. The tram ran from The Esplanade and then onto Barkly Street.

The cable tram was withdrawn on 29 August 1925 with the tram line truncated to terminate in Acland Street instead of continuing onto Barkly Street. The cable tram line was also converted into electric operation which opened in December 1925.

After the truncation of the Acland Street line in 1925, the terminus consisted of a single track in the centre of Acland Street with a double track tramway merging into a single track just before the terminus.

In early 2015, proposals were published to rebuild the tram terminus and to convert Acland Street into a pedestrian thoroughfare. These works were to involve the duplication of the terminus by adding a second track and platform.

The old single track tram terminus closed on 8 August 2016 to allow for the full rebuilding of the terminus. During the occupation, Route 96 trams were altered to terminate at Luna Park.

The new tram terminus opened on 11 November 2016 and featured two tracks and two platforms in a side platform arrangement. It allowed for greater capacity on Route 96. The completed terminus upgrade also saw Acland Street permanently closed to road traffic through the site.
