= Prahran and Malvern Tramways Trust =

Former Australian tram operator

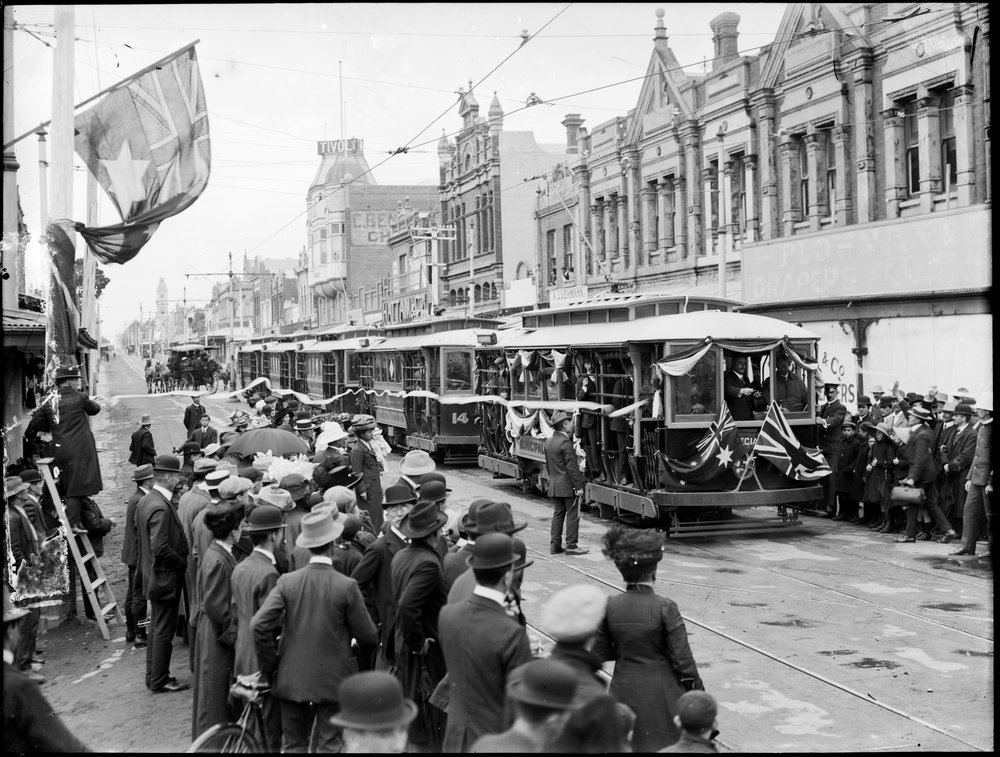
Opening of the PMTT tramway Glenferrie Road, Malvern, 16 December 1911

The Prahran and Malvern Tramways Trust (PMTT) was a tram operator in Melbourne, Australia. The trust was formed in 1907, with its first line operating in 1910. Its functions were taken over by the Melbourne & Metropolitan Tramways Board in 1920.

== History ==
The PMTT was formed under the Prahran and Malvern Tramways Trust Act 1907 (No. 2130) to construct and operate electric trams in the municipalities of Prahran and Malvern. The original members of the trust were Alexander Cameron (Chairman), W. O. Strangward (Secretary), H.S. Dix (Manager and Engineer), S. Bangs, William Knox MLC, Walter Lewis and Thomas Luxton.

Noyes Brothers were selected as the primary contractors for the work. The first rail was laid along High Street on 20 October 1909. Malvern tram depot opened on 30 May 1910 as were the first lines: along High Street from Charles Street, Prahran to Tooronga Road and the other along Glenferrie and Wattletree Roads from High Street to Burke Road.

In 1910, the PMTT was reconstituted to include representatives of the cities of St Kilda and Caulfield. The Trust consisted of five members, one each from the four constituent councils and the chairman. The first tram service began along High Street on 30 May 1910 with a 6¾ mile track. On 11 July 1911, the Trust was authorised to construct a tramway along Dandenong Road from Glenferrie Road to Chapel Street, Windsor. The route was extended to Caulfield and St Kilda in 1913. The extension of the electric tram service along Glen Huntly Road, Elsternwick, took place in 1914.

In 1913, the municipalities of Kew and Hawthorn joined the Trust, with the route being extended to those suburbs in that year. In 1915, Camberwell also joined, and the route extended to Camberwell in 1916.

The Trust was dissolved on 2 February 1920 and its assets passed to the Melbourne & Metropolitan Tramways Board. By this time the Trust had 90 trams on 35 miles (56 km) of tramway route, which were mainly located in the south-eastern suburbs of Melbourne.

== Surviving trams ==
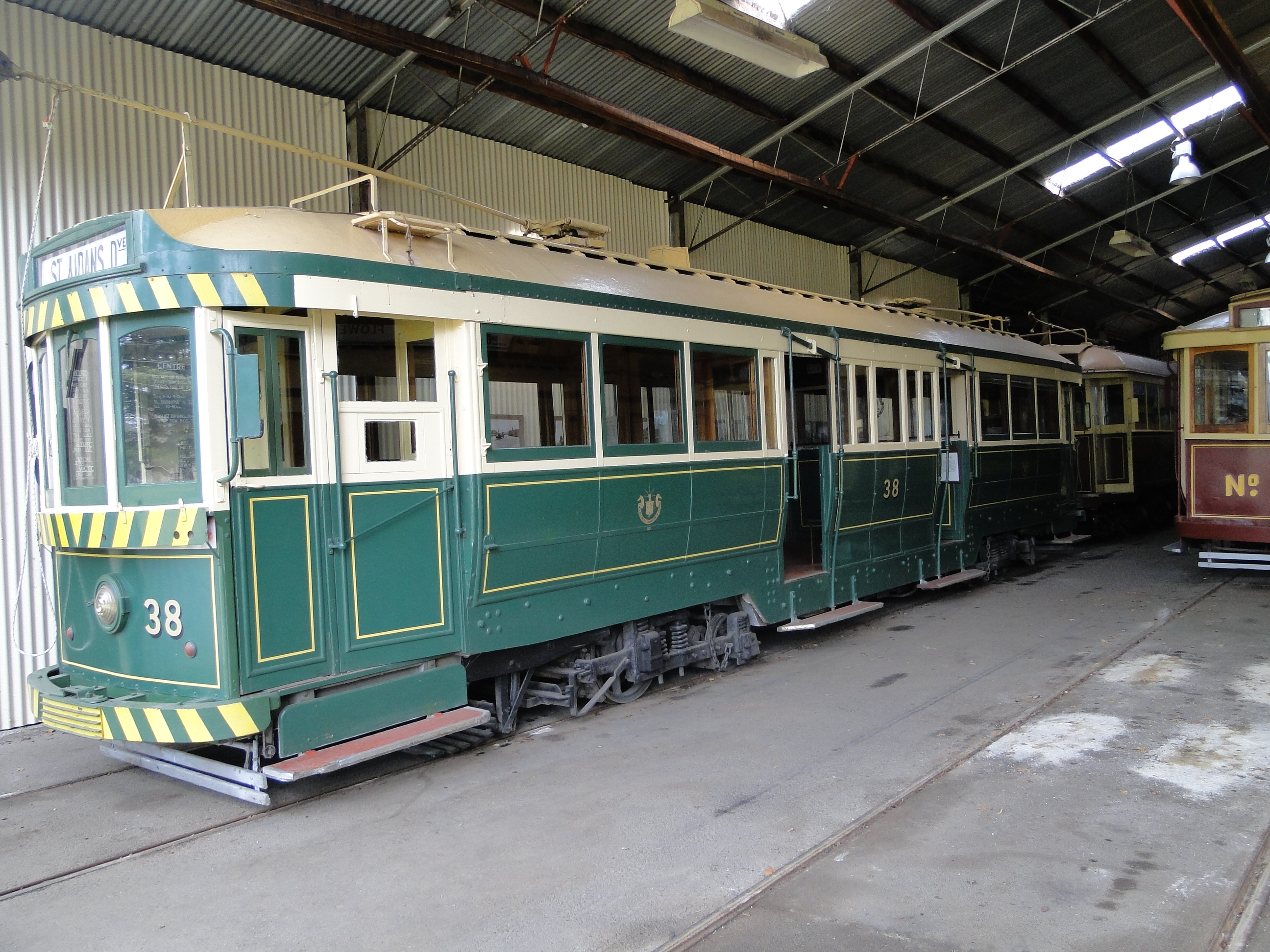
PMTT Tram 41 built in 1914, now at Ballarat Tramway Museum

- Tram 35 (1913), is a C class double truck maximum traction tram, built by Duncan & Fraser. It was bought by the State Electricity Commission of Victoria (SECV) in 1951 and moved to Ballarat tramways and renumbered to Tram 40. It was the last operating tram to run on the Ballarat network. It is now at Ballarat Tramway Museum.
- Tram 38 is an E class double truck maximum traction tram, built in 1914 by Duncan & Fraser. It was bought by the SECV and moved to Geelong tramways in 1951 as Tram 37. In 1956 it was moved to Ballarat as Tram 42. When the tramway closed in 1971 the tram body was given to the Zion Congregational Church in Sebastopol. The trucks were given to a Perth museum and later to the Australian Electric Transport Museum in South Australia. The body later went to the Creswick North Primary School, then to the Tramway Museum Society of Victoria. It is now privately owned.
- Tram 39 is an E class double truck maximum traction tram, built in 1914 by Duncan & Fraser. It was bought by the SECV and moved to Geelong tramways in 1951 as Tram 39. In 1956 it was moved to Ballarat as Tram 41. When the tramway closed in 1971 it was moved to Horsham, where it is part of a static display in a restaurant.
- Tram 40 is an E class double truck maximum traction tram, built in 1914 by Duncan & Fraser. It was bought by the SECV and moved to Geelong tramways in 1951 as Tram 40. In 1956 it was moved to Ballarat as Tram 43. When the tramway closed in 1971 the tram was given to the Apex Club of Barwon. In 1987 it became a static display at the Tramway Museum Society of Victoria.
- Tram 41 is an E class double truck maximum traction tram, built in 1914 by Duncan & Fraser. It was bought by the SECV and moved to Ballarat tramways in 1951. It is now in operating condition at the Ballarat Tramway Museum as Tram 38.
- Tram 42 is an E class double truck maximum traction tram, built in 1914 by Duncan & Fraser. It was bought by the SECV and moved to Ballarat tramways in 1951 as Tram 39. When the tramway closed in 1971 it was given to the Lions Club of Lismore, Victoria, for display in a park. It was returned to Ballarat in 1976 and is now at Ballarat Tramway Museum where it is used as a static display area.
- Tram 44 is a double truck maximum traction tram built in 1914 by Duncan and Fraser. It was bought by the SECV in 1951 for the Bendigo tramways as Tram 17. It is still in operating condition at the Bendigo Tramways.
- Tram 63 was built in 1913 by Duncan & Fraser. This was an H class tram, single truck, drop end, closed combination. It was bought by the State Electricity Commission of Victoria for use on the Ballarat tramways in 1931 as Tram 18. When the tramway closed in 1971 it was given to the Borough of Sebastopol. It was the last tram to travel on the Ballarat network when it was towed along the tracks to a park in Sebastopol as a historic exhibit. It was recovered by the Ballarat Tramway Museum in 1982 and restored to operating condition.
- Tram 65 built 1915 by the Meadowbank Manufacturing Company. It was a J class tram, single truck, known as an open California combination car. This became MMTB J class tram No. 65. It was bought by the Melbourne Electric Supply Company in 1928 and used on the Geelong tramways as No. 28. The State Electricity Commission of Victoria moved the tram to Ballarat in 1936 and it became No. 11. It was given to the Daylesford Historical Museum in 1971 by the SECV. It was brought back to the Ballarat Tramway Museum in 1977. This tram is not in a working condition and is in storage off site.
- Tram 68 built in 1915 by the Meadowbank Manufacturing Company. This was also a J class tram bought by the Melbourne Electric Supply Company in 1928 for the Geelong tramways at Tram 30. It was moved by the SEC in 1936 to the Ballarat tramways as Tram 13. When the tramways closed in 1971, the tram was given to the Lake Goldsmith Steam Preservation Society. It is now in operating condition at the Ballarat Tramway Museum.
- Tram 71 built in 1915 by the Meadowbank Manufacturing Company. This was also a J class tram bought by the Melbourne Electric Company in 1928 and moved to Geelong as Tram 27. The SECV moved the tram to Ballarat in 1936 and became No. 12. It is now in operating condition at the Sydney Tramway Museum.
- Tram 73 built in 1915 by the Meadow Manufacturing Company. This was a J class tram bought by the SECV in 1931 and moved to Ballarat as No. 17. It is now in operating condition at the Tramway Museum Society of Victoria.
- Tram 75 built in 1915 by the Meadow Manufacturing Company. This was also a J class tram bought by the Melbourne Electric Company in 1928 and moved to Geelong as Tram 29. The SECV moved the tram to Ballarat in 1936 and became No. 14. It is now in operating condition at the Ballarat Tramway Museum.
- Tram 76 built in 1916 by the Meadow Manufacturing Company. This was a J class tram bought by the SECV in 1931 and moved to Ballarat as No. 19. It is now in operating condition at the Tramway Museum Society of Victoria.
- Tram 84 was built in 1917 by James Moore & Co of Melbourne. It was a single truck California combination tram. It was sold to the Electric Supply Company of Victoria for the Bendigo tramways in 1931 as tram 16. It was converted to one man operation in 1935. In 1962 the tram was in poor condition and only in limited use, and finally withdrawn in 1965. It was restored for the tourist tramway in Bendigo, and restored again in 2009.
