= Willsmere railway station =

Former railway station in Victoria, Australia

Coordinates: 37.79489°S 145.036525°E

Willsmere

General information
- Line: Outer Circle
- Platforms: 2

History
- Opened: 24 March 1891
- Closed: 12 April 1893

Services
Preceding station	Disused railways	Following station
Fulham Grange towards Fairfield	Outer Circle line	East Kew towards Oakleigh
	List of closed railway stations in Melbourne	
Location

Willsmere was a railway station on the Outer Circle railway line, located in the suburb of Kew, Melbourne, Australia. The station was named after the estate of early Kew settlers H.S. and Thomas Wills. Willsmere was opened with the line in 1891 and closed with it in 1893.

Although on a single line, the station had two side platforms, with one being on a crossing loop. The station platforms and buildings were still present around 1926-1927, but were believed to have been removed around 1930.
