= Fulham Grange railway station =

Former railway station in Victoria, Australia

Fulham Grange
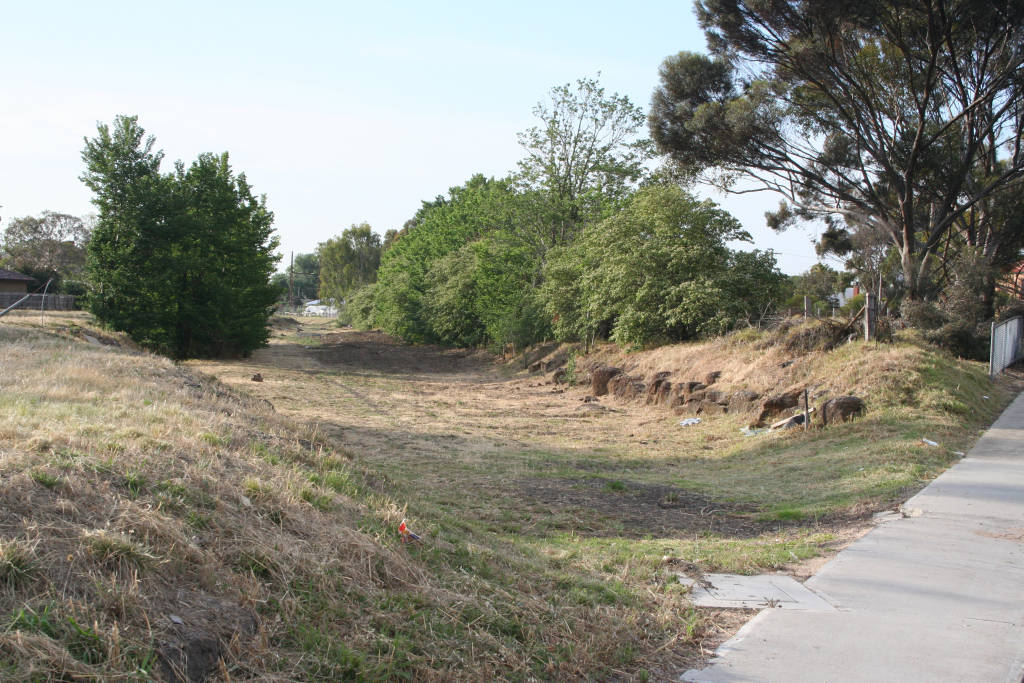
- Site of Fulham Grange, looking away from the Grange and Heidelberg Road intersection towards the Hurstbridge line

General information
- Coordinates: 37°46′53″S 145°01′28″E
- Line: Outer Circle
- Platforms: 2

History
- Opened: 24 March 1891
- Closed: 12 April 1893

Services
Preceding station	Disused railways	Following station
Fairfield	Outer Circle line	Willsmere towards Oakleigh
	List of closed railway stations in Melbourne	
Location

Fulham Grange was a railway station on the Outer Circle located in the suburb of Alphington, Melbourne, Australia. Located near the Grange and Heidelberg Road intersection, it was a quarter mile (0.4 km) from Fairfield Park station. Opened to serve the speculative housing estate after which it was named, it was provided with two side platforms, one located on a loop to the north of the main line. The station was opened with the line on 24 March 1891, and closed with it on 12 April 1893. The line through it reopened on 29 July 1919, as part of the APM Siding, closing again in the 1990s.
