= Outer Circle railway line =

Partially closed railway line in Melbourne, Australia

Outer Circle

Overview
- Status: Closed line – Outer Circle (Anniversary) Trail, operational with passenger services from Riversdale to Alamein
- Owner: Victorian Railways (1890–1983); MTA (1983–1989); PTC (1989–1997); VicTrack (1997–Current)
- Locale: Melbourne, Victoria, Australia
- Termini: Fairfield; Oakleigh
- Continues from: Hurstbridge
- Continues as: Gippsland line
- Connecting lines: Alamein, Belgrave, Gippsland, Glen Waverley, Hurstbridge, Lilydale
- Stations: 9 current stations; 6 former stations

Service
- Services: Alamein

History
- Work began: 24 March 1890
- Opened: Darling to Oakleigh on 24 March 1890; Camberwell to Waverley Road on 30 May 1890; Fairfield to Riversdale on 24 March 1891; Shenley to Canterbury on 15 March 1892
- Completed: 15 March 1892
- Reopen: See Alamein line
- Closed: Fairfield to Riversdale on 12 April 1893; Shenley to Canterbury on 12 April 1893; Ashburton to Oakleigh on 9 December 1895; Darling to Waverley Road on 9 December 1895; Camberwell to Ashburton on 1 May 1897

Technical
- Line length: 25.275 km (15.705 mi)
- Number of tracks: Single track
- Track gauge: 1,600 mm (5 ft 3 in)

The Outer Circle Railway was opened in stages in 1890 and 1891, as a steam-era suburban railway line, in Melbourne, Australia. It traversed much of the modern City of Boroondara, including the suburbs of (from north to south) Kew East, Camberwell, Burwood, Ashburton, and Malvern East. At its longest, it ran from Fairfield station, on what is today the Hurstbridge line, to Oakleigh station, on the current Gippsland line.

== History ==
The Outer Circle railway was first advocated in 1867, by a group known as the Upper Yarra Railway League, who suggested that the Gippsland railway line could be brought into Melbourne via the outer suburbs. However, the term itself was coined in 1873 by Engineer-in-Chief of the Victorian Railways, Thomas Higinbotham, who suggested an "outer circle route".

Construction of the Gippsland line was authorised in 1873, but the line, which was to be operated by the Victorian Railways, could not be brought into Melbourne by the direct route used today because the privately owned Melbourne & Hobson's Bay United Railway Company (M&HBUR) controlled the line from Flinders Street to South Yarra, and there was no connection between the privately run Flinders Street station and the Victorian Railways station at Spencer Street. That problem was solved when the M&HBUR was purchased by the government in 1878, and the direct rail line from South Yarra to Oakleigh was opened the next year.

Agitation for the Outer Circle line was then taken over by politicians and land speculators. It was included in the 1882 Railway Construction Act, and was authorised by the 1884 Railway Construction Act, passed on 12 December 1884. The act also authorised the construction of a viaduct connecting Flinders Street and Spencer Street stations. By 1885, two of the parliamentarians who had helped gain approval for the line, F.E. Beaver and James Munro, had purchased half the land adjoining the new railway.

Construction commenced in 1888 and was completed in 1891. The Outer Circle connected Camberwell station (on the modern Belgrave and Lilydale lines) with Oakleigh station to the south, via Riversdale on what is now the Alamein line. The northern section ran from Riversdale to Fairfield station (then called Fairfield Park).

There was also a branch line from the closed Waverley Road station (near the modern East Malvern station) to Darling and Burnley. That was the first section of what later became the Glen Waverley line, and was opened a few weeks before the Outer Circle.

When opened the line was 10.3 miles (16.6 km) in length, and had 11 stations, all provided with twin platforms and crossing loops. Provision was made for double track, and heavier-duty 75 pounds (34 kg) per yard rails were used. Despite that, the line never carried Gippsland traffic, and the severe economic depression of the early 1890s meant that suburban development along the line ceased.

The northern portion of the Outer Circle was originally laid with 75 lb/yd (37 kg/m) rails, which were removed during World War II and sold to PMG for use as telegraph poles. The rails south of Ashburton were probably 60 lb/yd (30 kg/m) Krupp or Barrow and Cammells rails with a slightly narrower head than the 1918 Australian Standard profile rails of the same weight, and were common on branch lines built during the 1880s. The rails were described as good for their era, though not up to modern metallurgy standards, but were penalised by short fishplates working loose and causing excessive wear.

In 1932 the disused Black Bridge, over Gardiner's Creek between Ashburton and Waverley Road, was noted to be in fairly good condition except for a few missing deck planks, fire damage to three of its base supports, and no ballast being present. It remained intact until the beginning of World War II, when it was sold for its timber content at a price of £500. In this period the platform structure remained but no buildings were present.

During the period when the line was closed but not yet abolished, when roads at level crossings were resurfaced the rails were removed and stacked neatly nearby, to permit re-use. These piles, and the Childers Street plate girder bridge near North Kew, were removed with final closure of the line in the late 1940s.

Due to the low traffic on the line, train firemen or guards were required to walk ahead of their trains with a red flag or lamp to halt road traffic at level crossings, and indicate to the train driver when it was safe to proceed. Trams intersecting with the line had compulsory stops on the approach side of the level crossings where the conductor would perform a similar duty; this requirement remained in place even after cessation of passenger services, and when the goods trains were reduced to only a few trips per week.

By the 1980s many of the cuttings had been filled in and converted to parks and playgrounds, while parts of the line were taken over for commercial uses.

== Services ==
Diagram showing Melbourne's rail network, including former and planned lines

The first section of the Outer Circle opened was on 24 March 1890, from Oakleigh to Waverley Road, and on to Burnley. It was followed by the line from Waverley Road to Camberwell on 24 March 1890, and the Riversdale to Fairfield Park section on 24 March 1891. From this time the line was operated as three different passenger services:

- Oakleigh to Burnley, change at Waverley Road for,
- Waverley Road to Camberwell, change at Riversdale for,
- Riversdale to Fairfield Park.

Lack of passengers led to service cuts, and the Riversdale to Fairfield Park section was closed completely from 12 April 1893, being replaced by a horse-drawn omnibus service. The Oakleigh to Ashburton and Darling section closed on 9 December 1895, and the last section, from Camberwell to Ashburton, closed on 1 May 1897. Camberwell to Ashburton was reopened 4 July 1898 as the Ashburton line.

=== Station histories ===
Station	Opened	Closed	Age	Notes
Fairfield	8 May 1888		138 years	Formerly Fairfield Park
Fulham Grange	24 March 1891	12 April 1893	24 months	
Willsmere	24 March 1891	12 April 1893	24 months	
East Kew	24 March 1891	12 April 1893	24 months	
Deepdene	24 March 1891	12 April 1893	24 months	
Roystead	24 March 1891	12 April 1893	24 months	
Shenley	24 March 1891	12 April 1893	24 months	
Camberwell	3 April 1882		144 years	
Canterbury	1 December 1882		143 years	
Riversdale	30 May 1890	1 May 1897	6 years	Reopened as part of Alamein line
Burwood	30 May 1890	1 May 1897	6 years	Formerly Hartwell; Reopened as part of Alamein line
Ashburton	30 May 1890	1 May 1897	6 years	Formerly Norwood; Reopened as part of Alamein line
Darling	24 March 1890		136 years	
Waverley Road	24 March 1890	9 December 1895	5 years	Formerly Waverley
Oakleigh	8 October 1877		149 years	

== Today ==
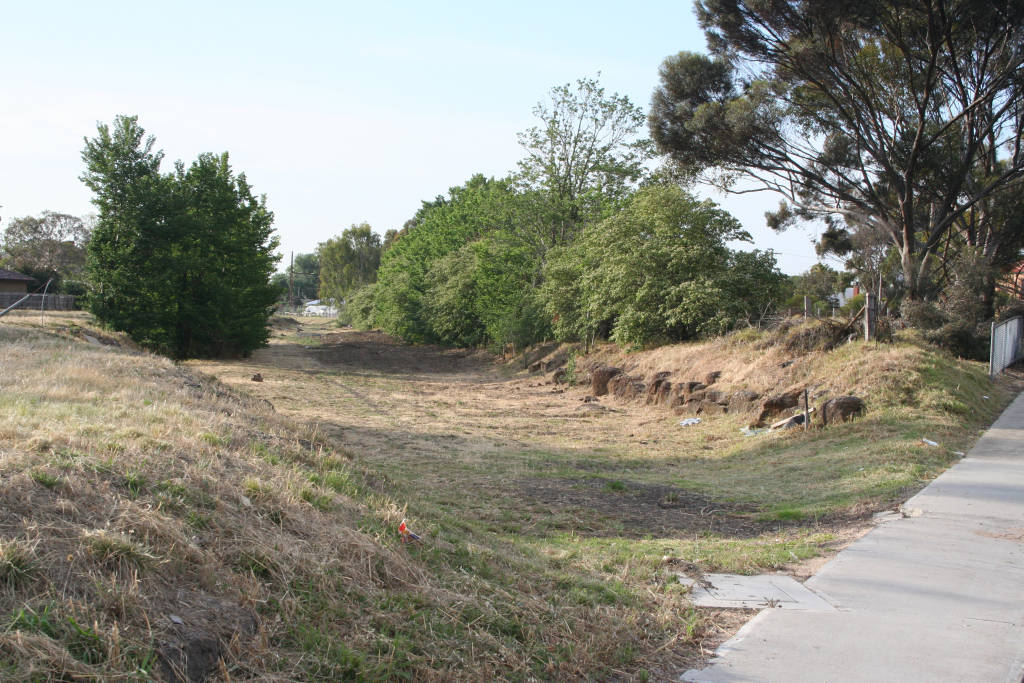
Remains of Fulham Grange station in 2007

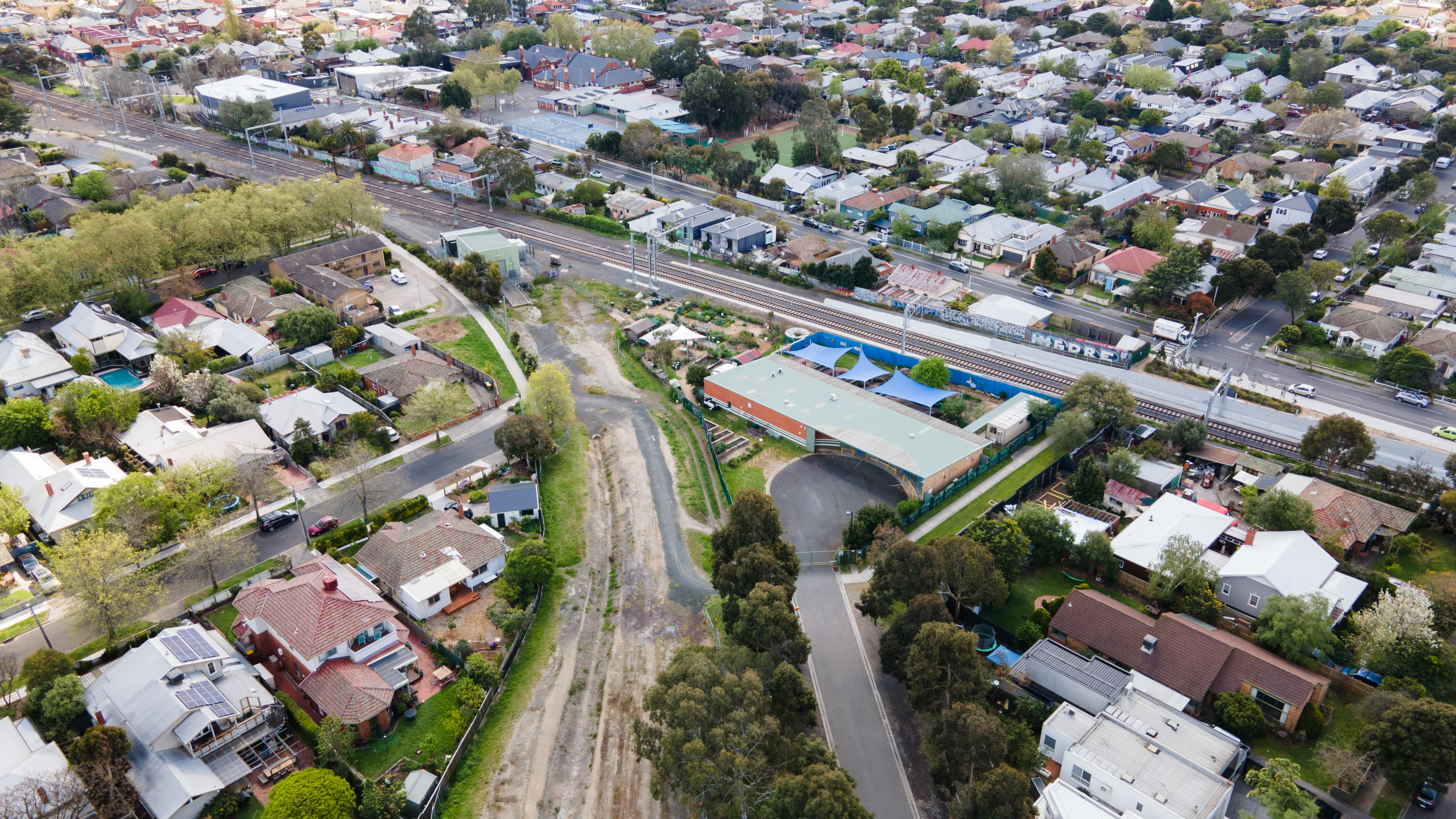
Aerial photo showing the alignment of the former Outer Circle Line at its former junction with the Hurstbridge Line near Fulham Grange, Alphington.

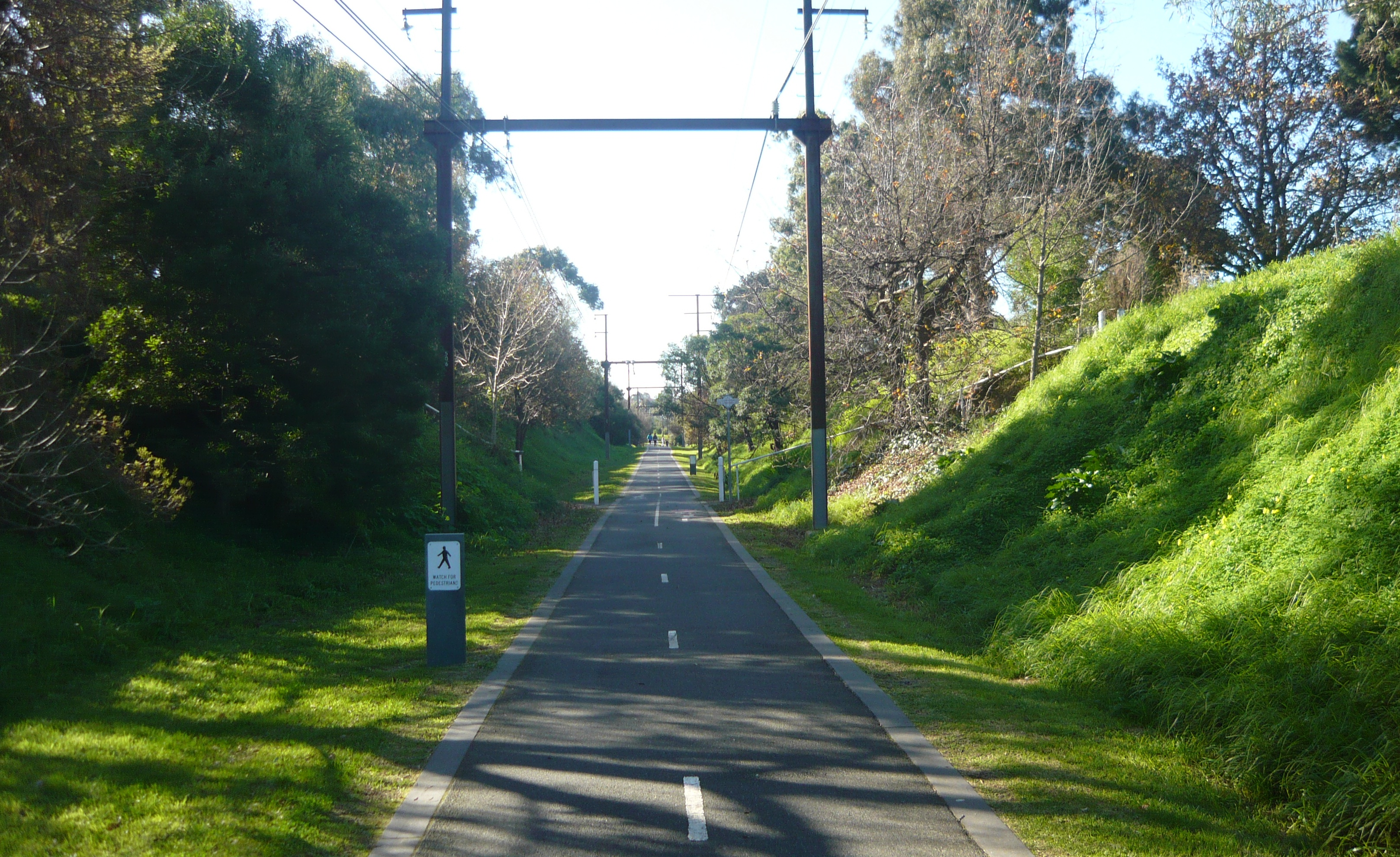
Outer Circle Railway formation south of Alamein station in 2011. Note stanchions for overhead catenary, erected in 1948 to connect Alamein to the Glen Waverley Line.

Today, the southern section of the line from Camberwell to Alamein is part of the Melbourne suburban railway network as the Alamein line. The northern section of the line, starting at East Camberwell, has been converted into the Outer Circle Trail, a walking and bicycle path. All of the closed stations have since been demolished, as has the railway infrastructure of the line, but some road overbridges and underbridges remain. The rail bridge over the Yarra River was converted into a road bridge as part of the Chandler Highway sometime after 1919. The track between Fairfield station and the northern bank of the Yarra River came into use from 1919 as the APM Siding, serving a paper mill built on the site.

Proposals for re-opening the line are regularly canvassed online.

== Media ==
In 2014, a documentary, Melbourne's Forgotten Railway – The Outer Circle, was produced by a Melbourne-based media production team, led by Ron Killeen and Andrew McColm. It documented the line and included "historians, an urban planning expert, as well as people who actually remember seeing and riding on the train".

== See also ==
- Inner Circle railway line
- Outer Circle Bicycle Path
- The Outer Circle Line documentary

== Sources ==
- Beardsell, David; Herbert, Bruce (1979). The Outer Circle: A history of the Oakleigh to Fairfield Park Railway. Australian Railway Historical Society (Victorian Division). ISBN 0-85849-024-2.
