= APM Siding =

Former railway station in Victoria, Australia

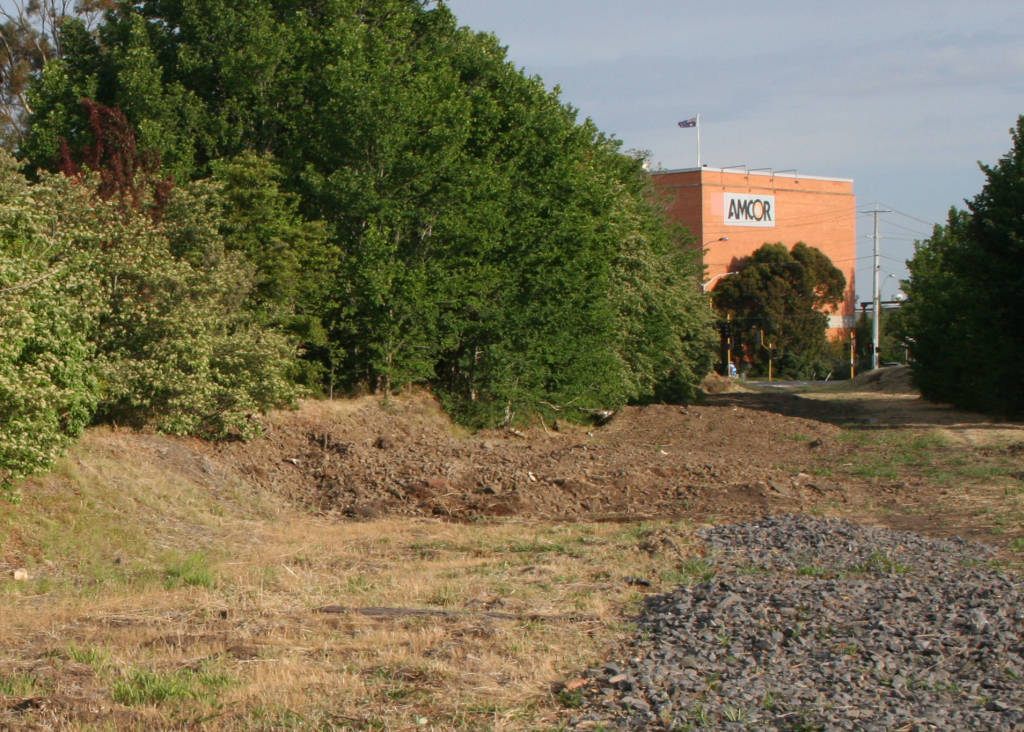
- Looking south-east along the dismantled siding, towards the paper mill

General information
- Coordinates: 37°46′51″S 145°01′26″E
- Line: APM Siding
- Tracks: Dismantled

History
- Opened: 29 July 1919
- Closed: 1994 (?)

Former services
Preceding station	Disused railways	Following station
Fairfield towards Fairfield	APM Siding	Terminus
	List of closed railway stations in Melbourne	
Location

The APM Siding was a 1.125-kilometre (0.7 mi) long private railway siding in the suburb of Alphington, Melbourne, Australia, that served the Australian Paper Manufacturers paper mill (later becoming the Amcor Fibre Packaging, before being closed in 2012). The siding branched from Fairfield station, on the Hurstbridge line, and ran south-east, passing through the intersection of Chandler Highway, Grange and Heidelberg Roads, and entering the factory.

== History ==
The line past the factory was opened on 24 March 1891, as the Outer Circle line, but the paper mill itself did not exist at this time. This section of the line was closed on 12 April 1893. It was not until 29 July 1919, that the line from Fairfield was reopened to the paper mill, and new sidings opened to serve it. From the Heidelberg Road – Chandler Highway intersection, the track left the alignment of the former Outer Circle railway, and slewed east into the mill itself. Once inside the factory, the siding spread into three branches: the east was used to unload paper pulp, the centre siding for unloading of coal wagons, and the western one being the longest running, almost to the mill's southern fence.

Electrification of the siding was provided in the 1950s, at the same time as that on the Gippsland line to Traralgon, with the overhead on the siding removed by June 1988, except for a short section, long enough for a six-car suburban train at the junction. In April 1994, V/Line announced that the mill would no longer have a need for siding, with it being booked out soon after. Contributing factors included the demise of coal traffic, and changes at the paper mill, meaning pulp would need to be double handled in the factory itself.

The rail was removed in 2003–2004, and ended up at the Yarra Valley Tourist Railway, with all overhead wiring on the siding gone by this time. A dwarf signal and overhead wiring stanchions remain in the paper mill grounds themselves. The paper mill was closed in 2012.

== Traffic ==
Until the boilers at the paper mill were converted to gas firing, 400 tonnes (440 short tons) of coal per day was transferred in two trains per day, from the company owned Maddingley brown coal mine, on the outskirts of Bacchus Marsh. Wagons were unloaded by hand, until a wagon tippler was provided in 1951.

Paper pulp was also transferred from the company Maryvale Mill (near Traralgon), first by steam locomotives, then after electrification of the Gippsland line, by E and L class electric locomotives, along with B and T class diesels. In later years, T and P classes worked the siding, with VOBX or VFNX wagons loaded with white paper in cubed form entering the siding and empty wagons out.

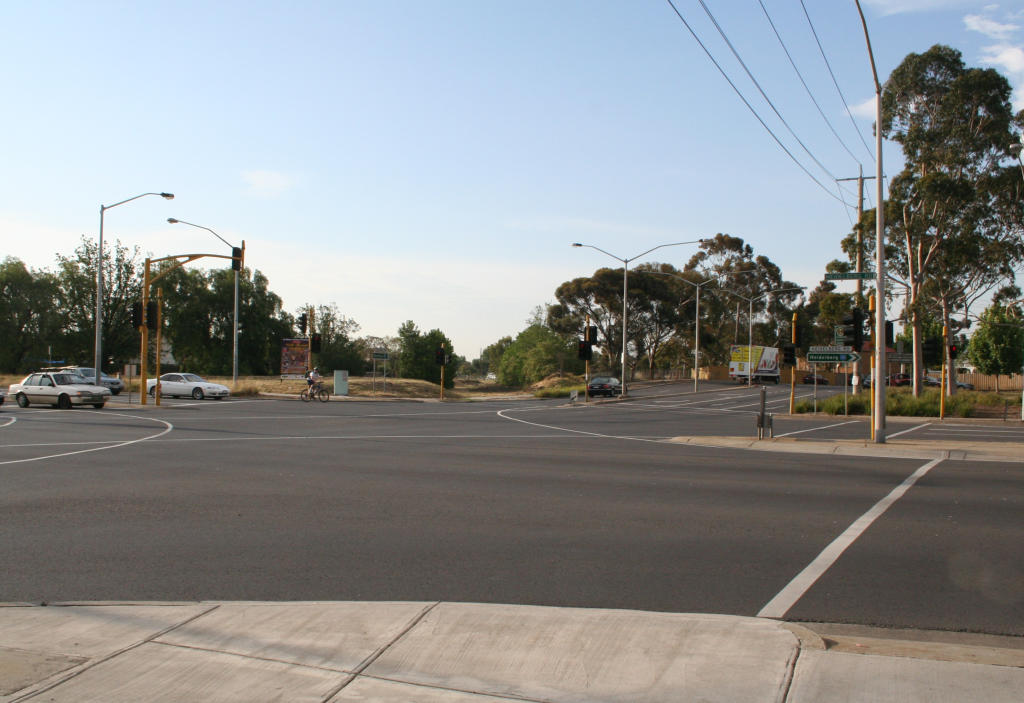
Intersection of Grange and Heidelberg Road, line towards Fairfield is in the background. The paper mill is behind the photographer.

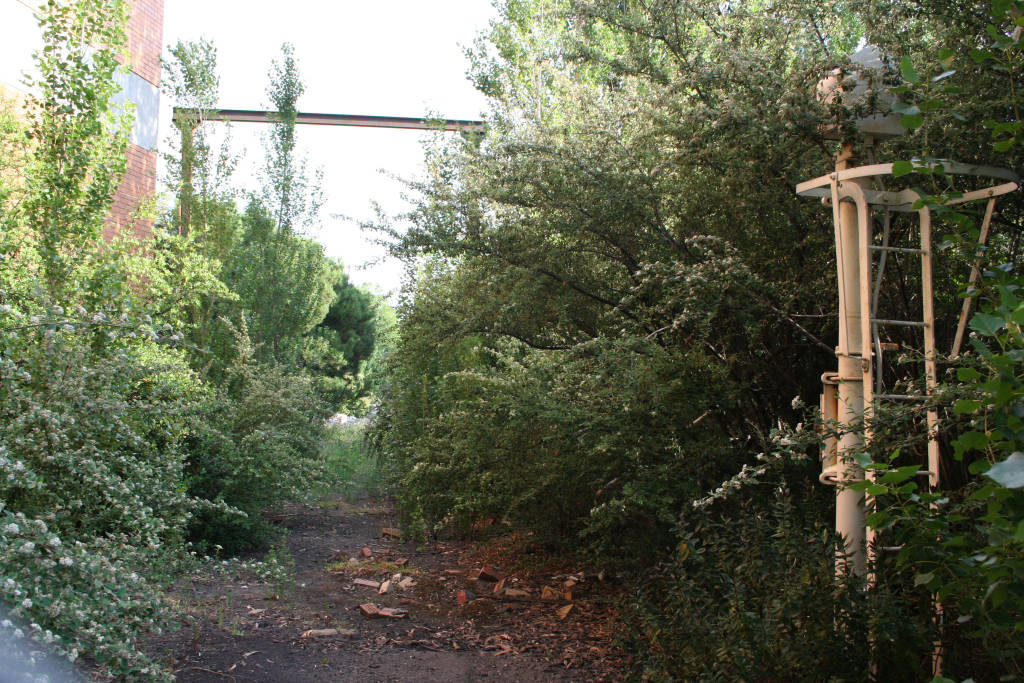
Looking into the paper mill itself from the Heidelberg Road intersection

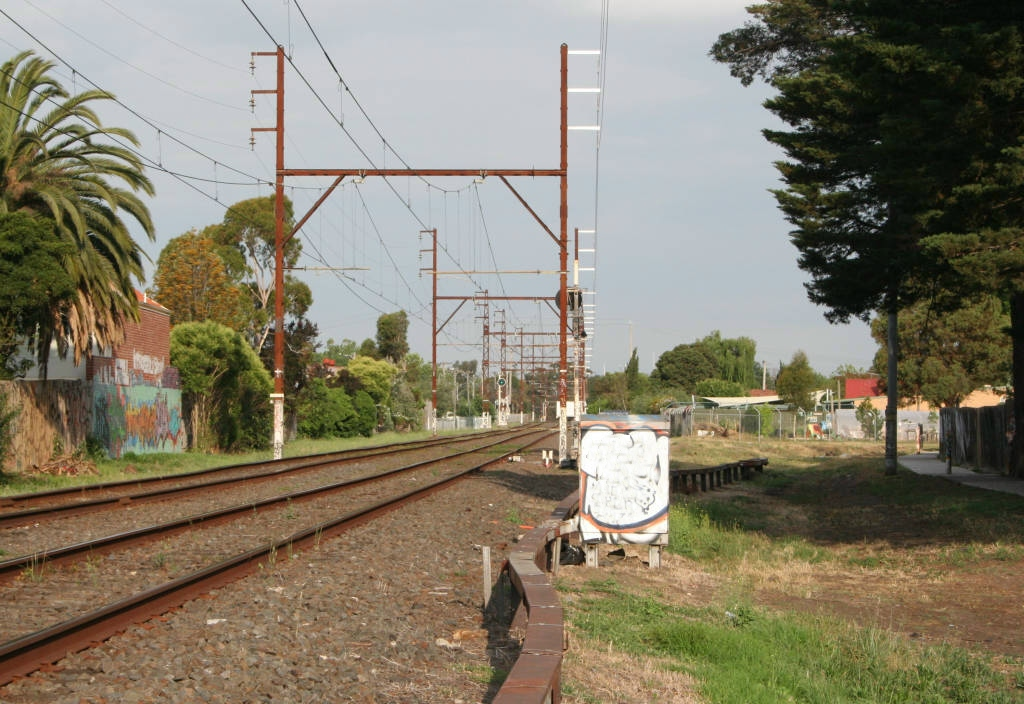
Junction of the siding (to the right) and the Hurstbridge line, looking away from the city towards the mill

== See also ==
- Alphington Paper Mill
