= Fairfield railway station, Melbourne =

Railway station in Melbourne, Australia

Fairfield
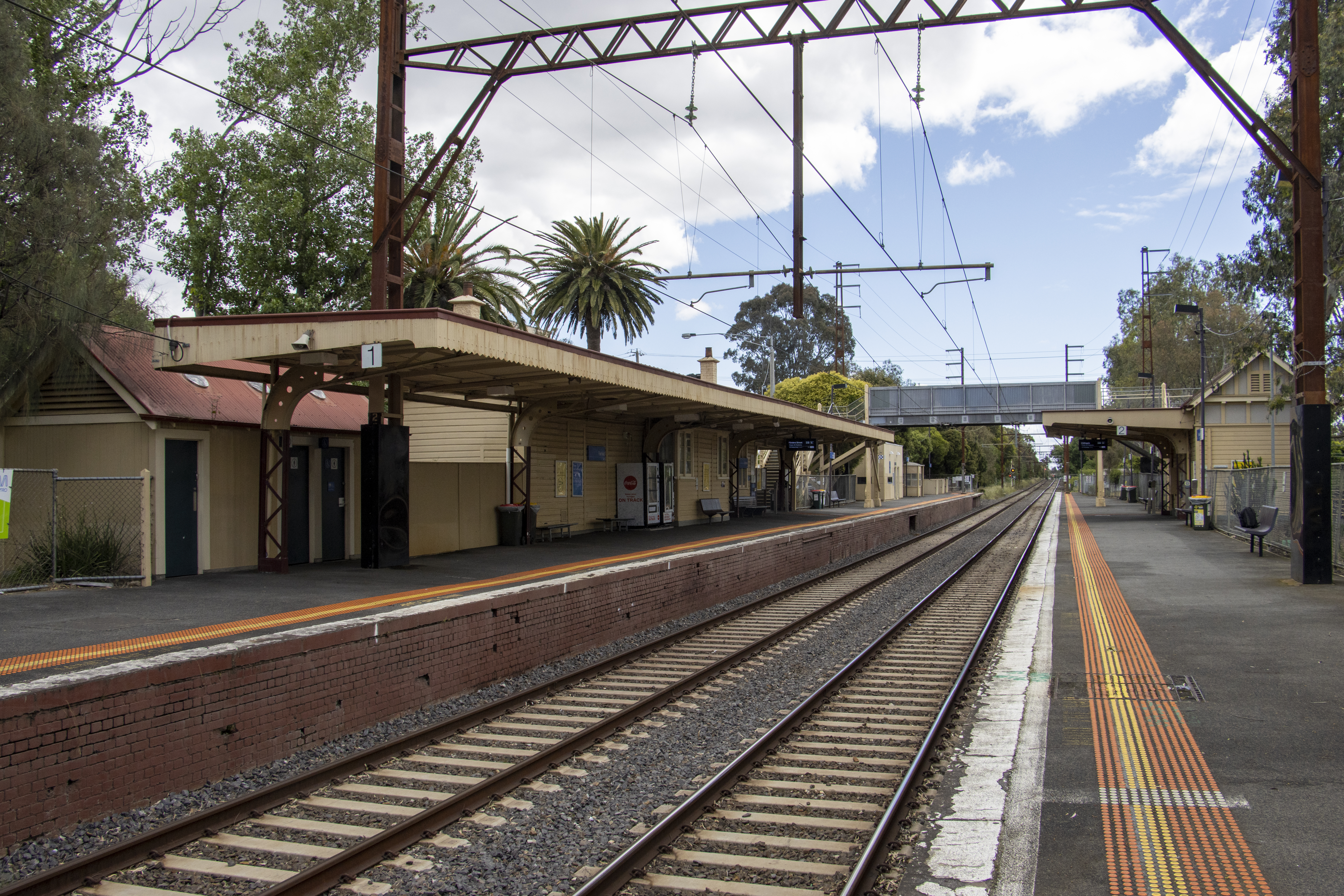
- Westbound view from Platform 2, November 2022

General information
- Location: Railway Place, Fairfield, Victoria 3078; City of Darebin; Australia
- Coordinates: 37°46′45″S 145°01′01″E
- System: PTV commuter rail station
- Owner: VicTrack
- Operator: Metro Trains
- Line: Hurstbridge
- Distance: 9.15 kilometres from Southern Cross
- Platforms: 2 side
- Tracks: 2
- Connections: Bus

Construction
- Structure type: Ground
- Parking: 70
- Cycle facilities: 54
- Accessible: Yes—step free access

Other information
- Status: Operational, host station
- Station code: FFD
- Fare zone: Myki zone 1
- Website: Public Transport Victoria

History
- Opened: 8 May 1888; 138 years ago
- Electrified: July 1921 (1500 V DC overhead)
- Former names: Fairfield Park (1888-1943)

Passengers
- 2005–2006: 537,938
- 2006–2007: 570,883 ▲6.12%
- 2007–2008: 630,522 ▲10.44%
- 2008–2009: 728,423 ▲15.52%
- 2009–2010: 724,525 ▼0.53%
- 2010–2011: 712,227 ▼1.65%
- 2011–2012: 641,788 ▼10.42%
- 2012–2013: Not measured
- 2013–2014: 637,880 ▼0.6%
- 2014–2015: 609,861 ▼4.39%
- 2015–2016: 669,597 ▲9.79%
- 2016–2017: 661,139 ▼1.26%
- 2017–2018: 524,408 ▼20.7%
- 2018–2019: 616,150 ▲17.5%
- 2019–2020: 509,000 ▼17.4%
- 2020–2021: 233,400 ▼54.1%
- 2021–2022: 262,300 ▲12.38%
- 2022–2023: 406,550 ▲54.99%
- 2023–2024: 444,550 ▲9.35%
- 2024–2025: 437,700 ▼1.54%

Services
Preceding station	Metro Trains	Following station
Dennis towards Flinders Street	Hurstbridge line	Alphington towards Hurstbridge
Former services
Preceding station	Disused railways	Following station
Junction	Outer Circle line	Fulham Grange
	List of closed railway stations in Melbourne	
Track layout
Location

Fairfield station is a railway station operated by Metro Trains Melbourne on the Hurstbridge line, part of the Melbourne rail network. It serves the north-eastern suburb of Fairfield in Melbourne, Victoria, Australia. Fairfield is a ground level host station, featuring two side platforms. It opened on 8 May 1888. Originally called Fairfield Park, the station was re-named Fairfield on 14 November 1943.

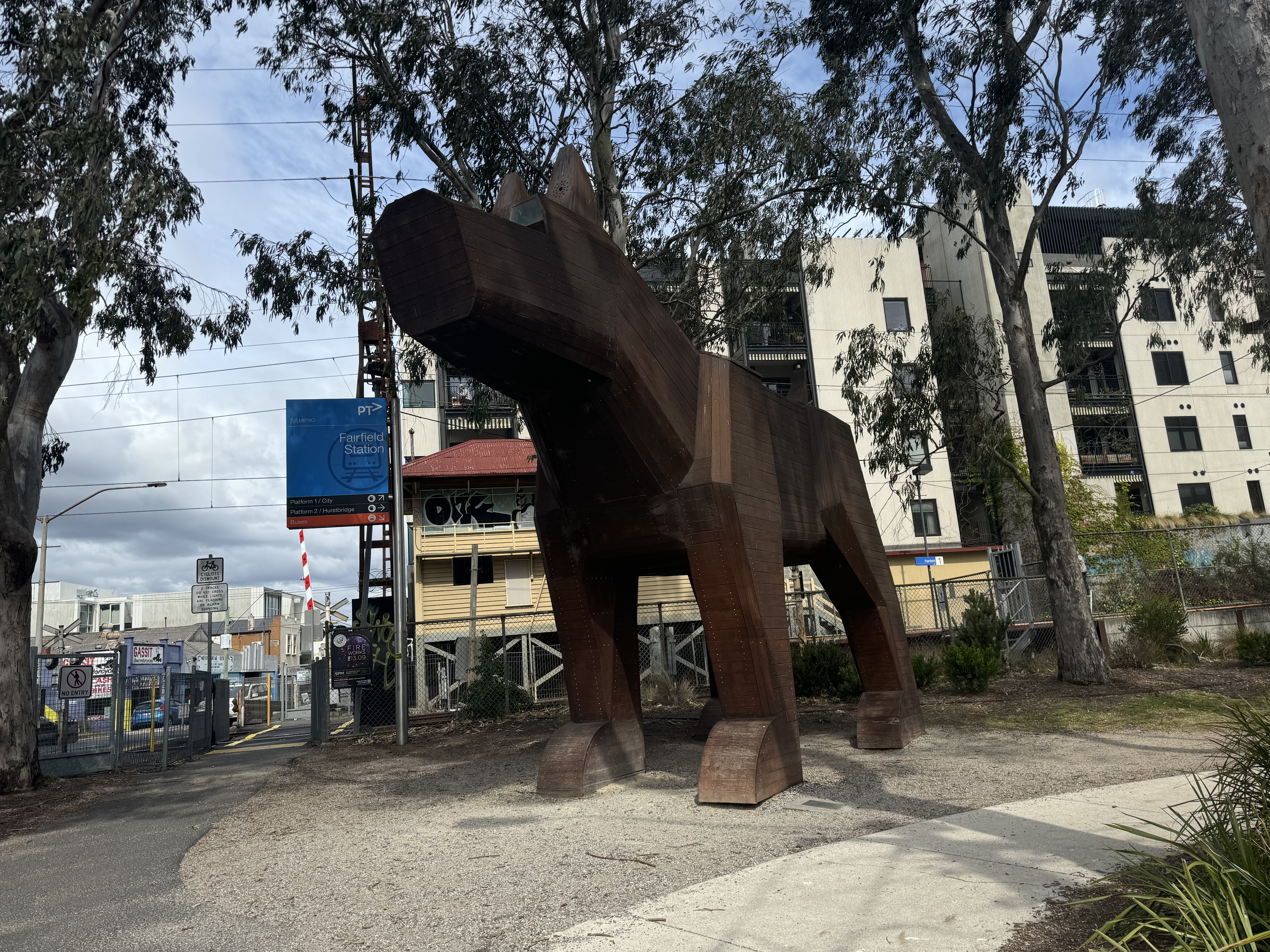
The Fairfield Industrial Dog Object located next to Platform 2, September 2024

Fairfield Industrial Dog Object (FIDO), a 6-metre-tall wooden sculpture of a dog, is located adjacent to the level crossing, at the eastern end of Platform 2.

== History ==
The station opened along with the railway between Collingwood and Heidelberg. Like the suburb itself, it was named after Fairfield Park, an estate that was subdivided on land owned by land speculator Charles Henry James. The estate is believed to have been named after Fairfield in Derbyshire, England. James built Melbourne's first tram line in 1884, a horse-drawn tram from the station northwards to the Fairfield Park Estate. The tramway had closed by 1890.

From 1891 to 1893, Fairfield was the junction for the northern end of the former Outer Circle line, and was later the junction for the APM Siding, which operated from 1919 to the 1990s and served the nearby Australian Paper Manufacturers paper mill.

The station was upgraded in the early 1910s with new timber station buildings constructed in 1911. That included replacing the former at-grade pedestrian crossing at Rathmines Street with a pedestrian footbridge, opened in March 1914.

In 1969, boom barriers replaced interlocked gates at the Station Street level crossing, at the down end of the station. In 1988, the goods siding at the station was abolished.

In 1999, the station building on Platform 1 underwent restoration.

== Platforms and services ==
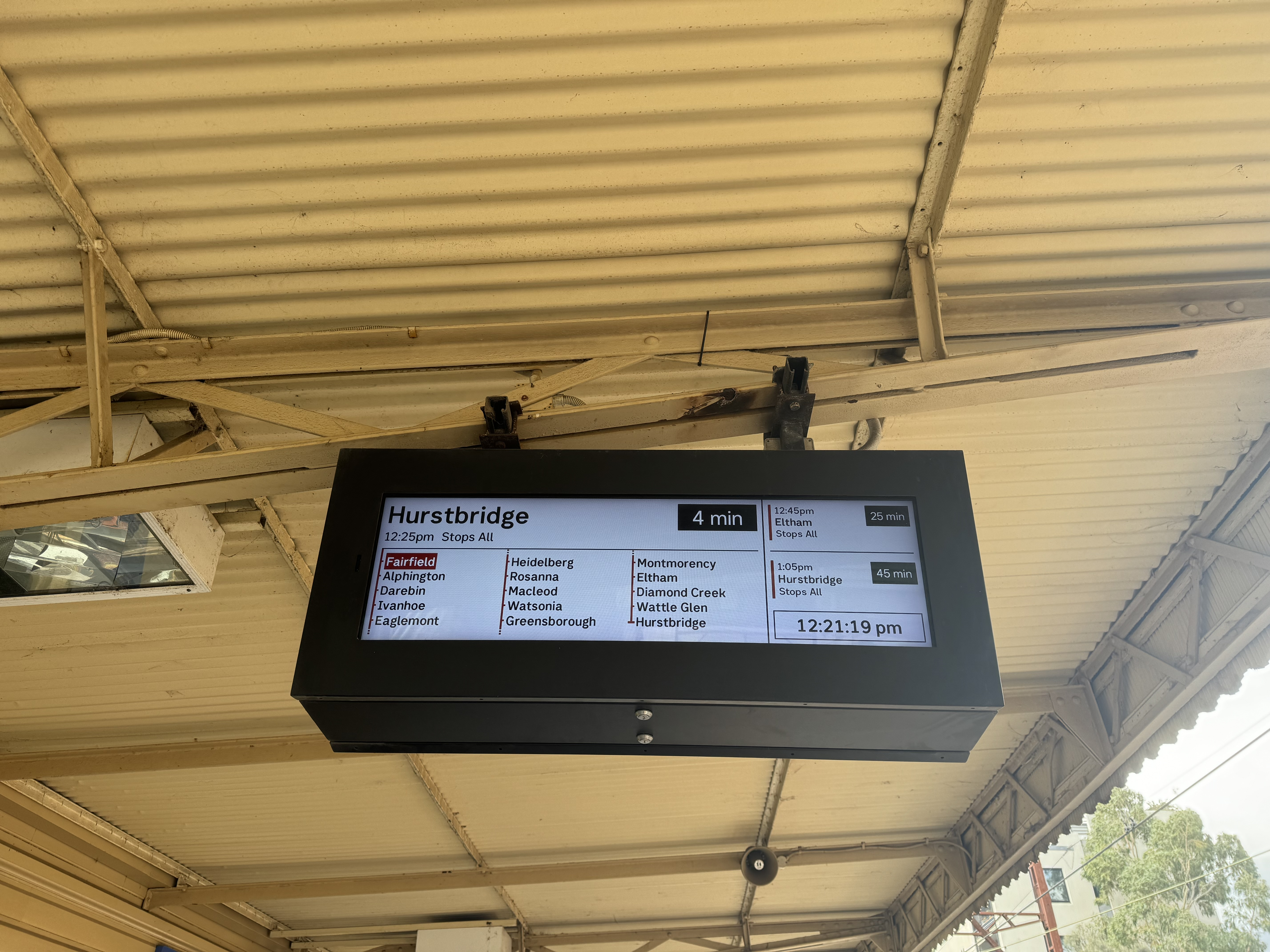
A PID on Platform 2 displaying a Hurstbridge-bound service, September 2024

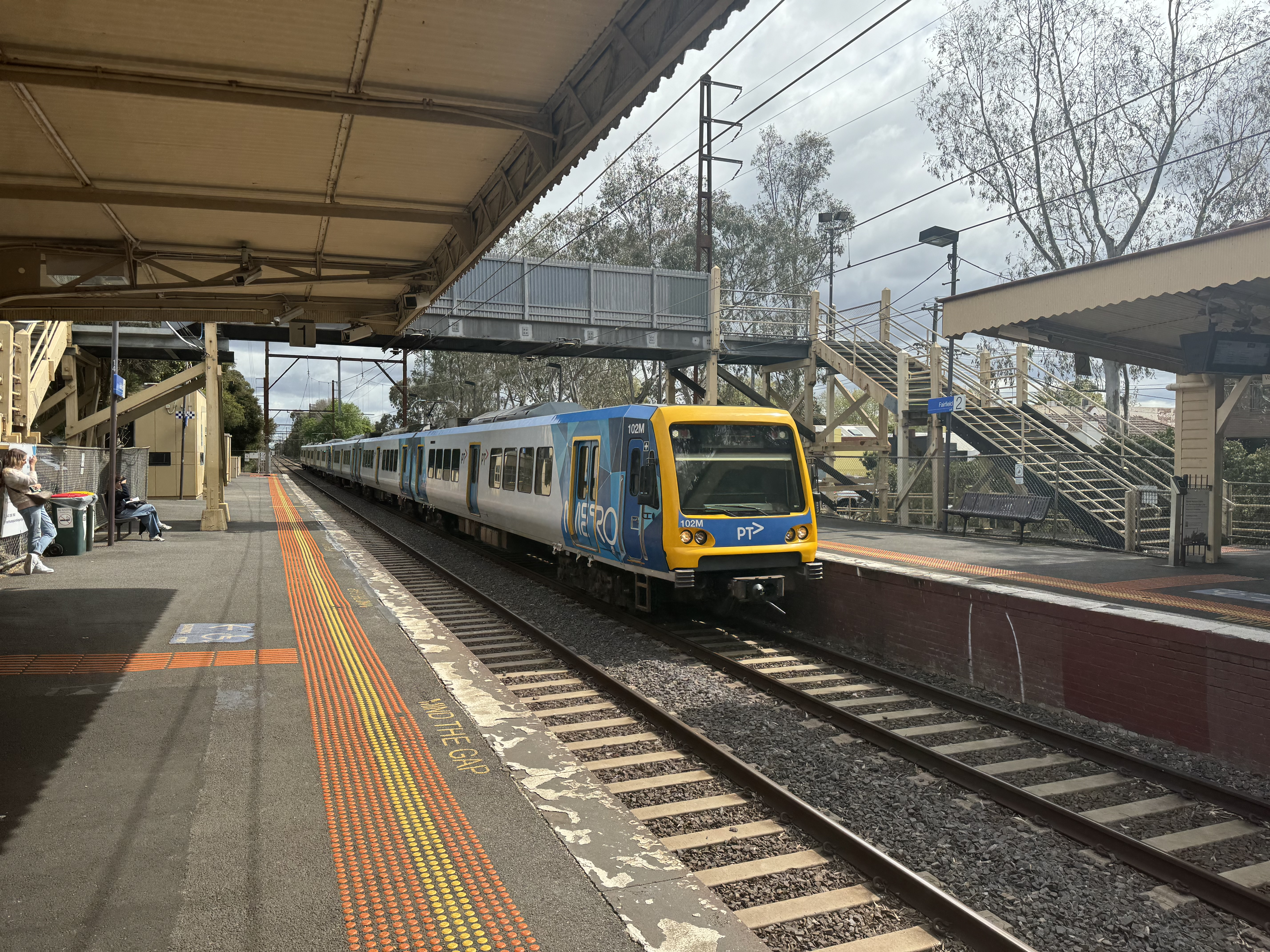
An X'Trapolis train on a Hurstbridge-bound service arrives at Platform 2, September 2024

Fairfield has two side platforms, and is served by Hurstbridge line trains.

Fairfield platform arrangement
Platform	Line	Destination	Service Type	Source
1	Hurstbridge line	Flinders Street	All stations and limited express services	
2	Hurstbridge line	Macleod, Greensborough, Eltham or Hurstbridge	All stations and limited express services	

== Transport links ==
Kinetic Melbourne operates two bus routes via Fairfield station, under contract to Public Transport Victoria:

- 567 : Northcote – Regent station
- 609 : Hawthorn Station – Fairfield

== Gallery ==
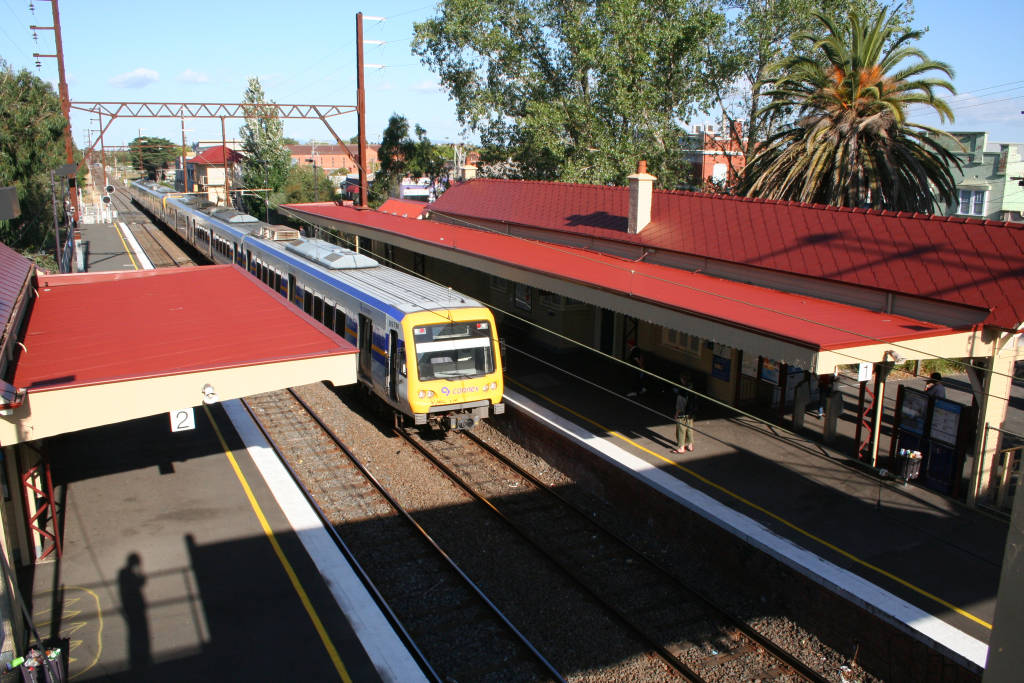
Eastbound view of station buildings and platforms with an X'Trapolis train arriving at Platform 1 on a City-bound service, February 2008

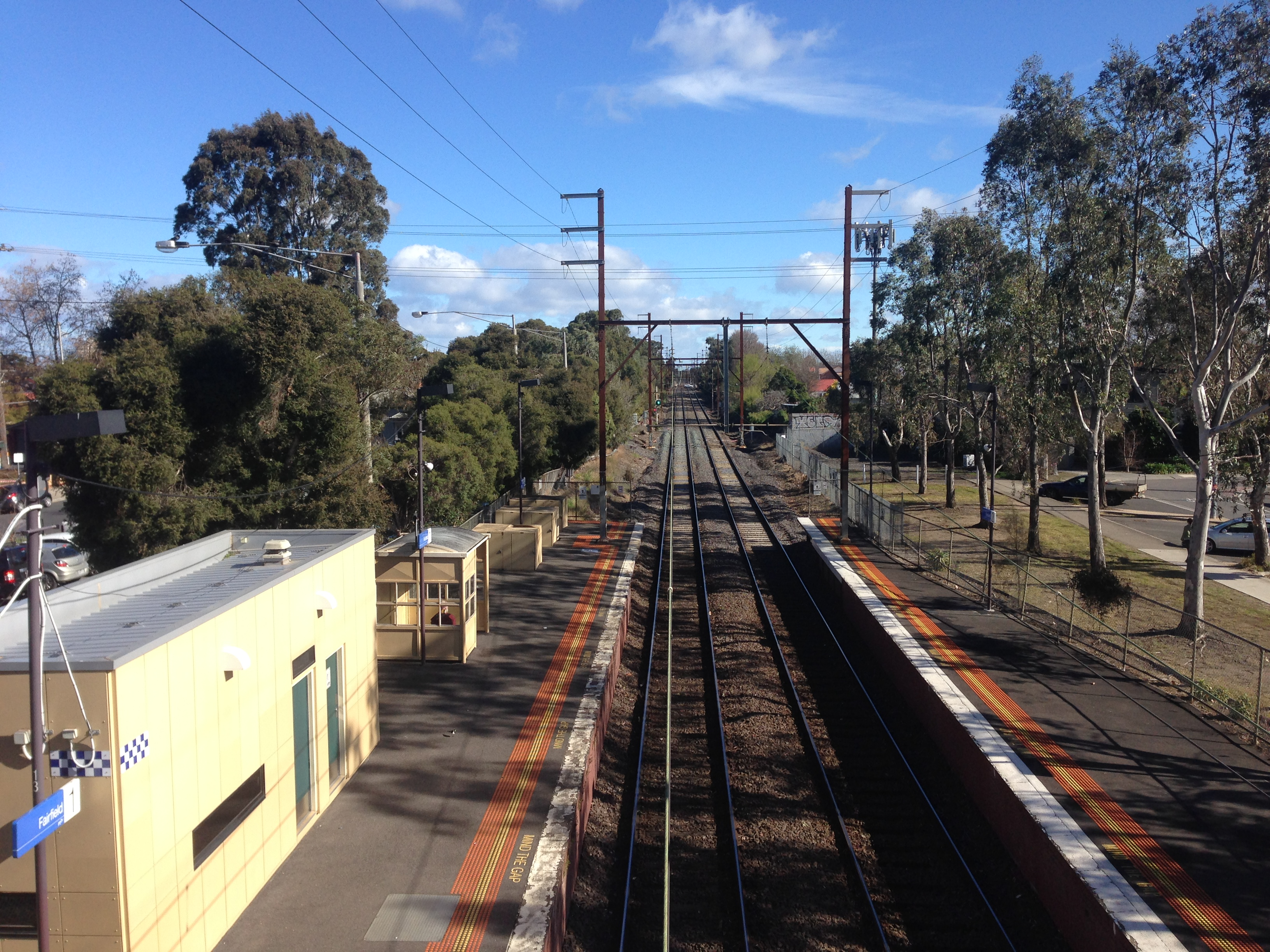
Westbound view of the station platforms,
July 2018

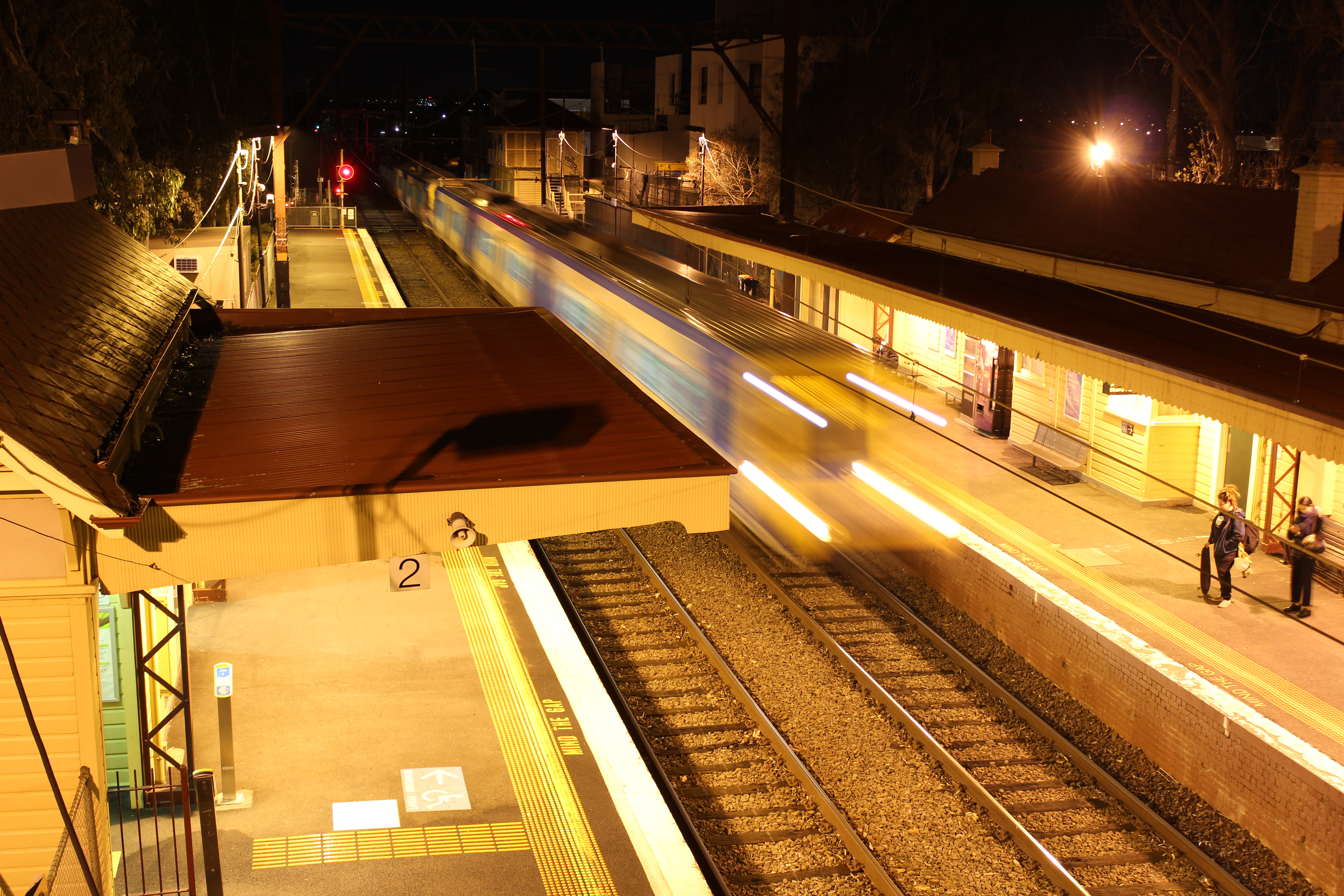
Eastbound view of Platform 2 with an X'Trapolis train arriving at Platform 1 on a City-bound service at night, August 2018

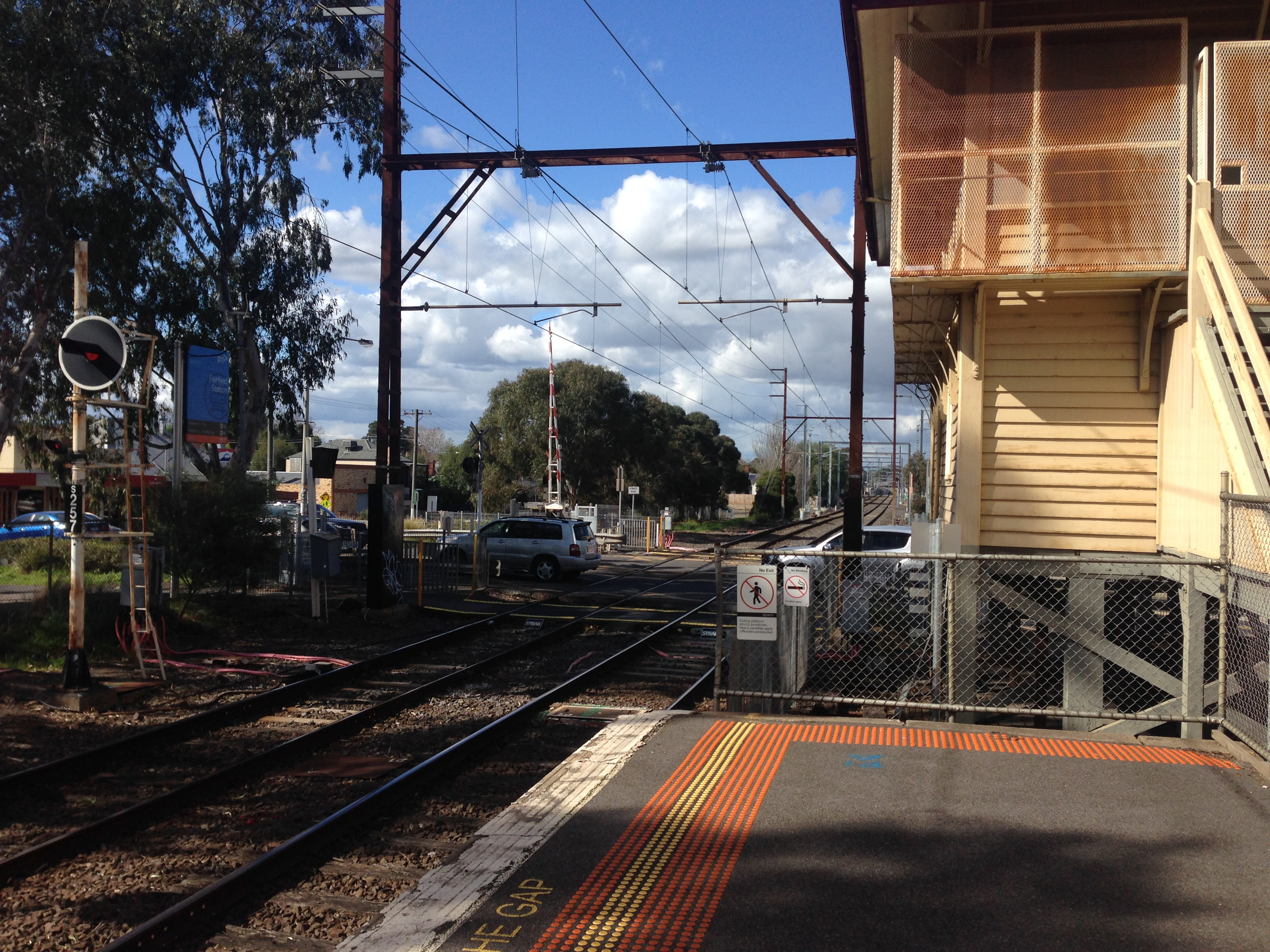
Partial view of station signal box and traffic stopped at the Station Street level crossing,
August 2019

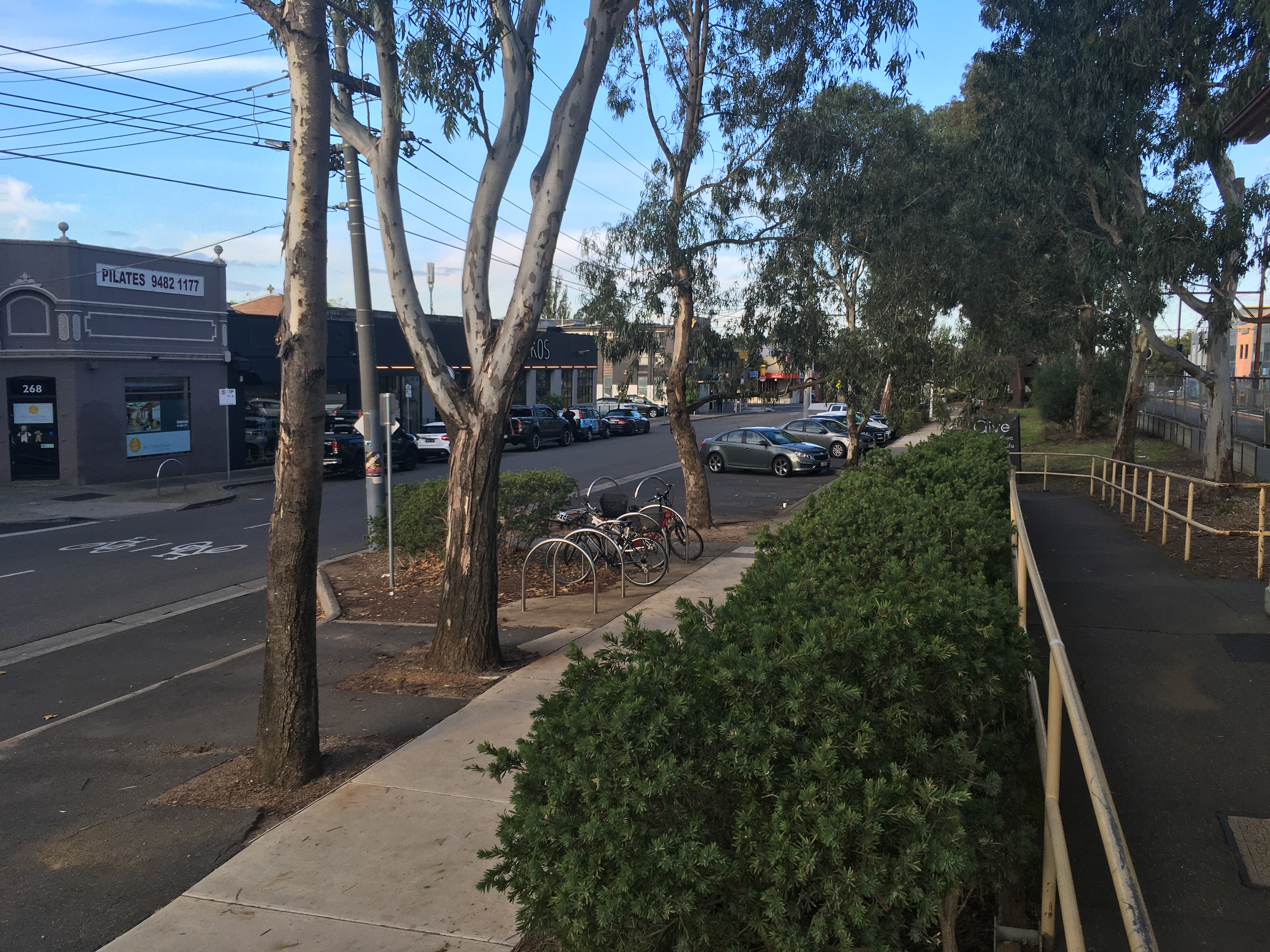
The northern side of the entrance and exit ramp to the station, partial view of Platform 2 and the nearby car park, April 2020

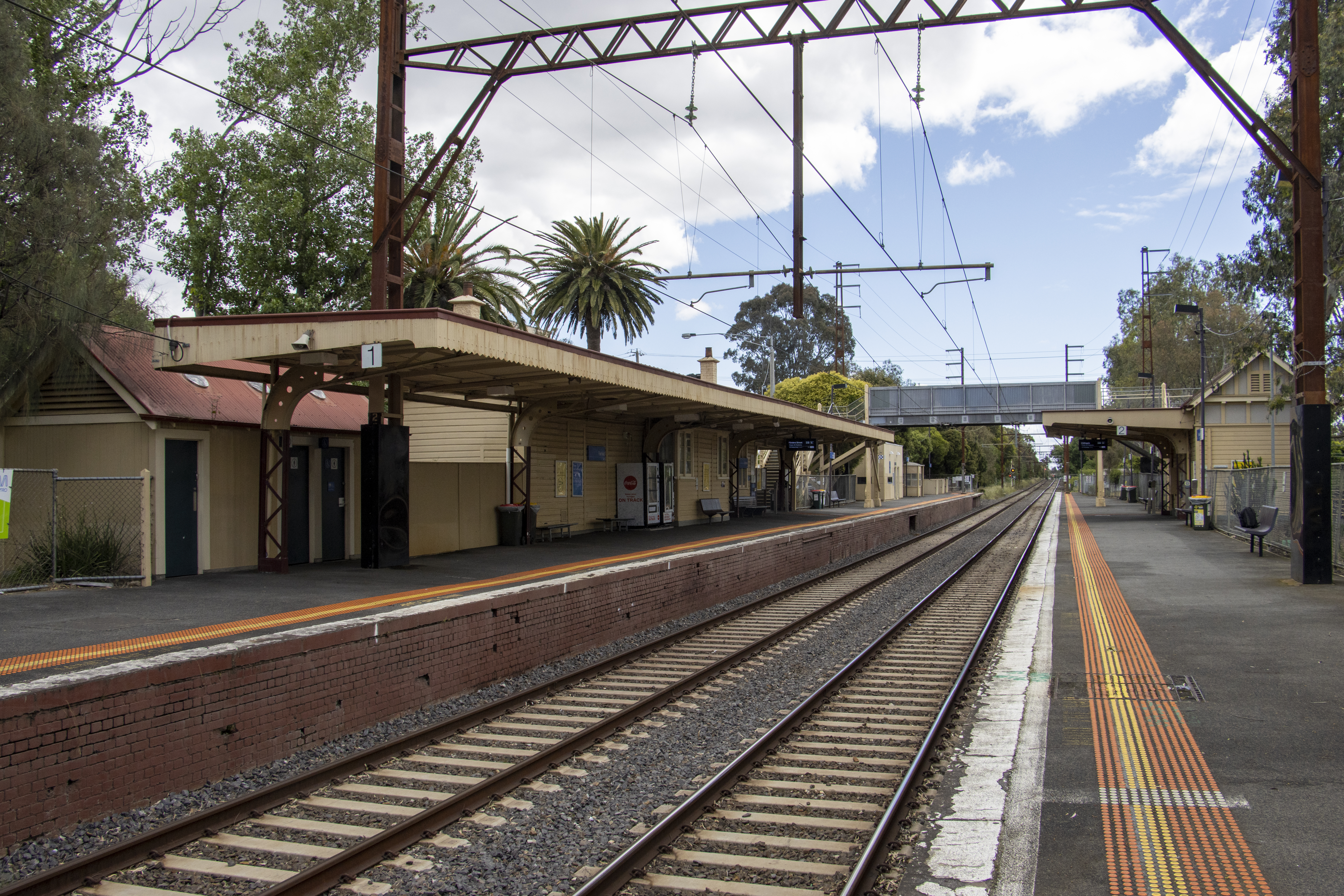
Westbound view from Platform 2, November 2022

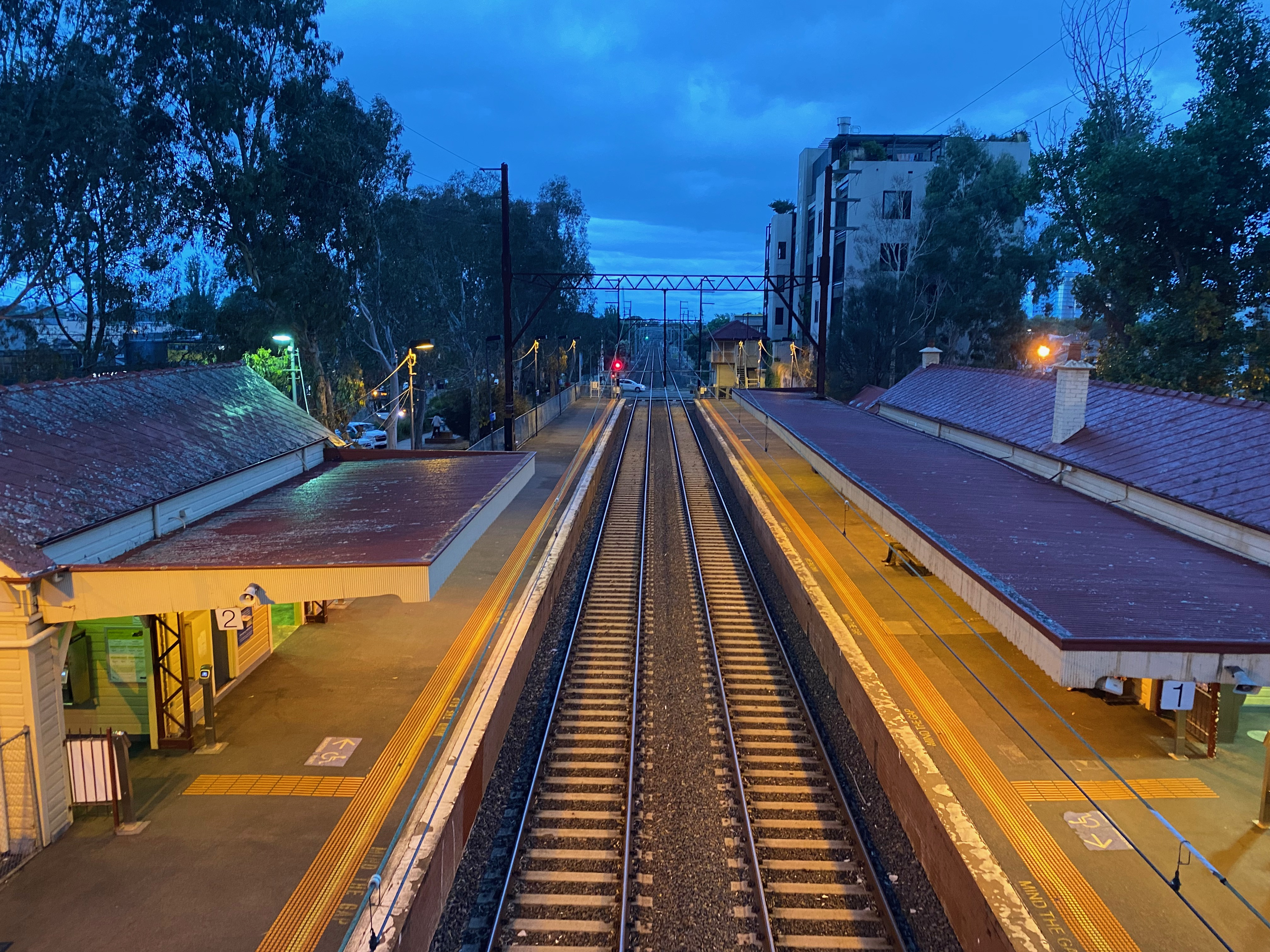
Eastbound view of station platforms and buildings at dusk, November 2023

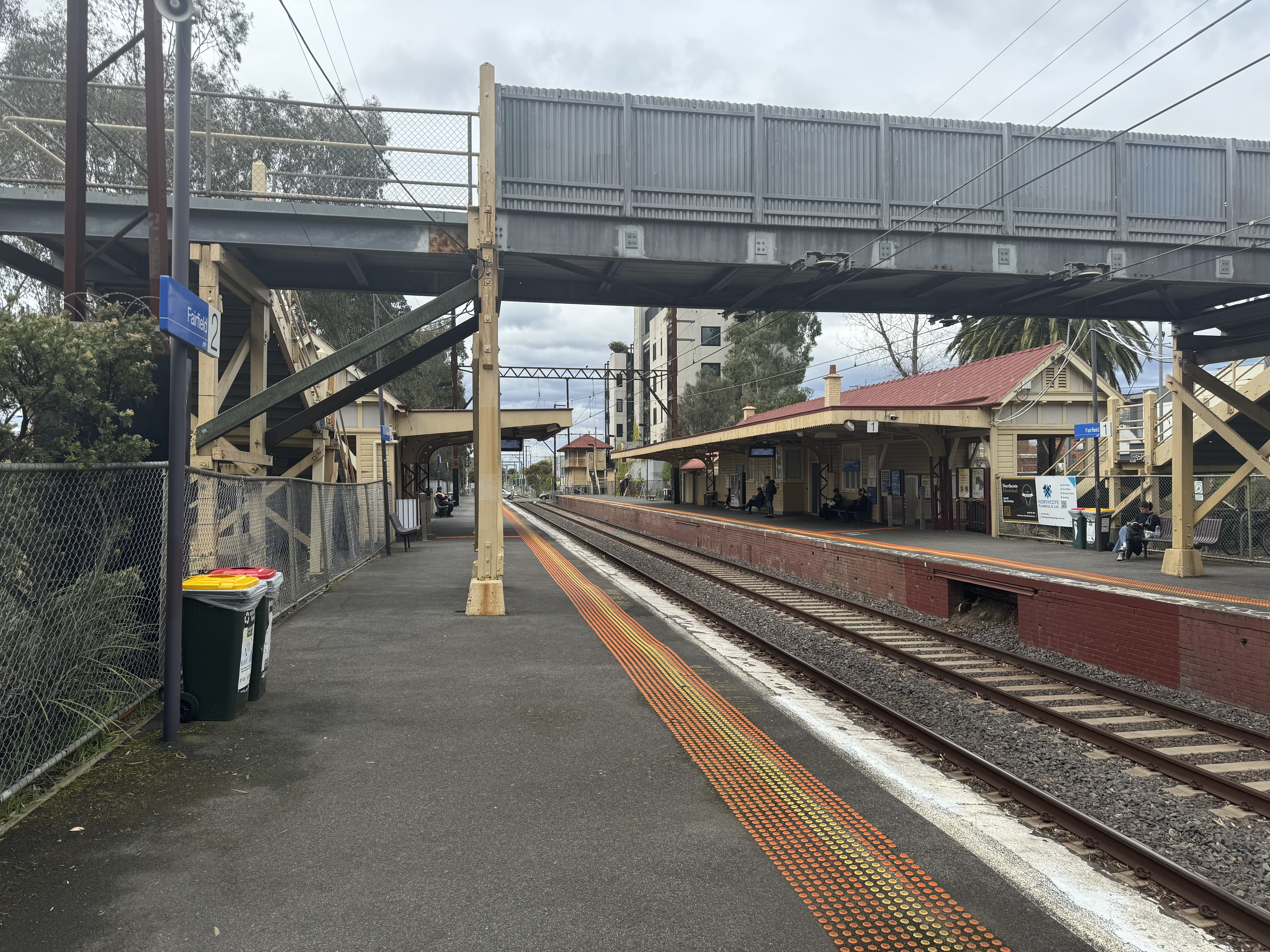
Eastbound view from Platform 2, September 2024

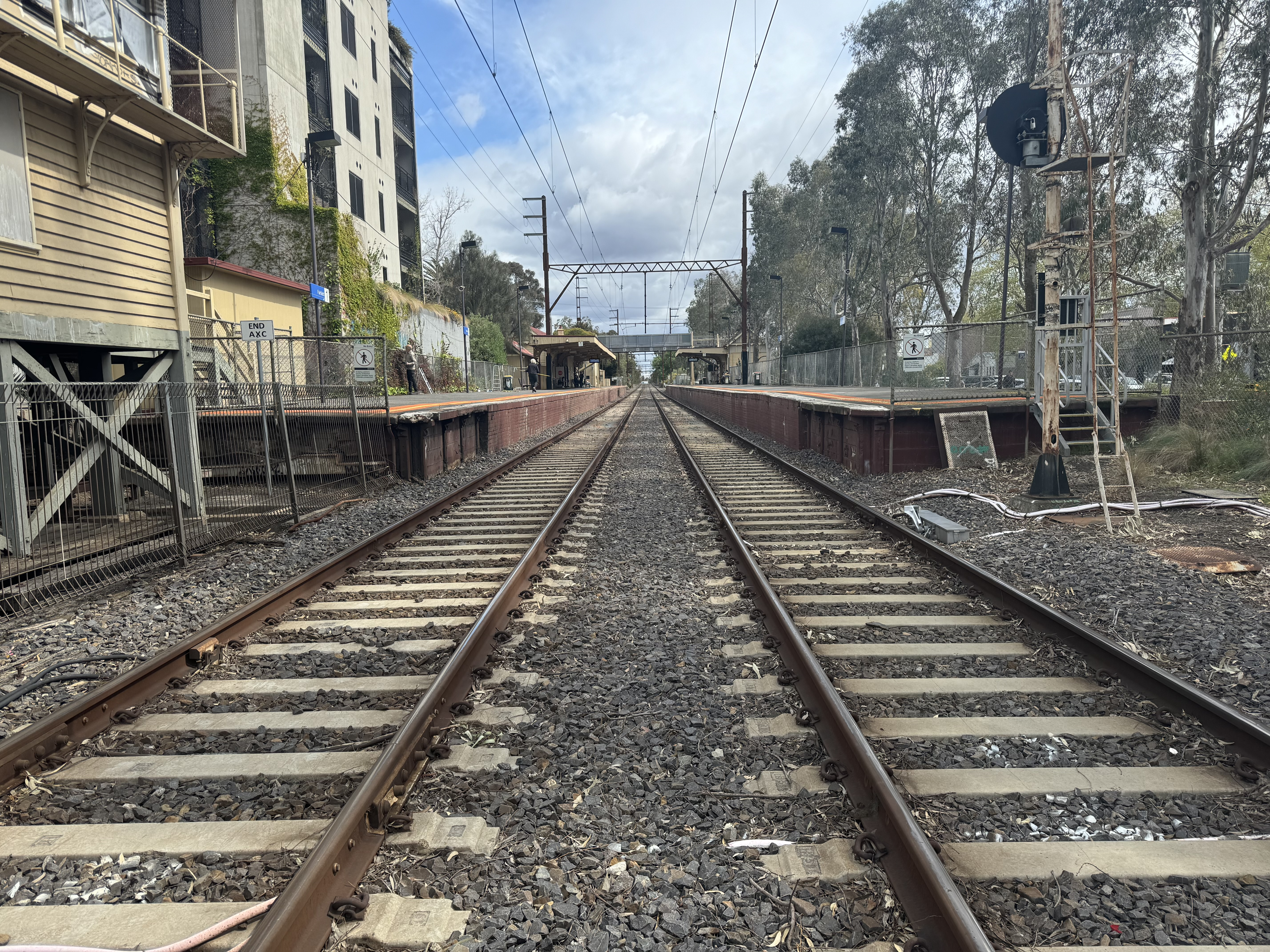
Westbound view of the station platforms, taken from the Station Street level crossing, September 2024

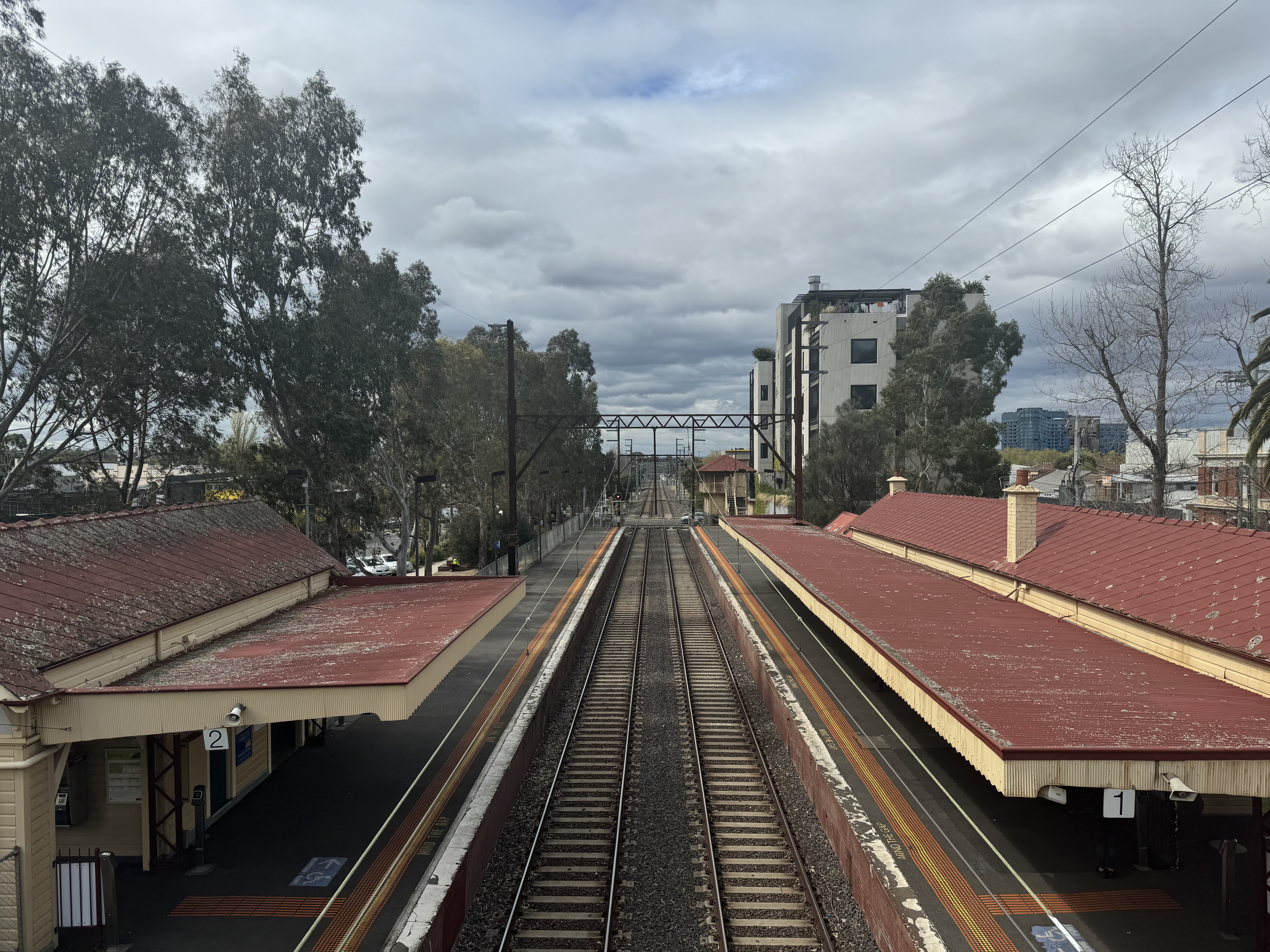
Eastbound view of the station platforms and buildings at daytime, September 2024

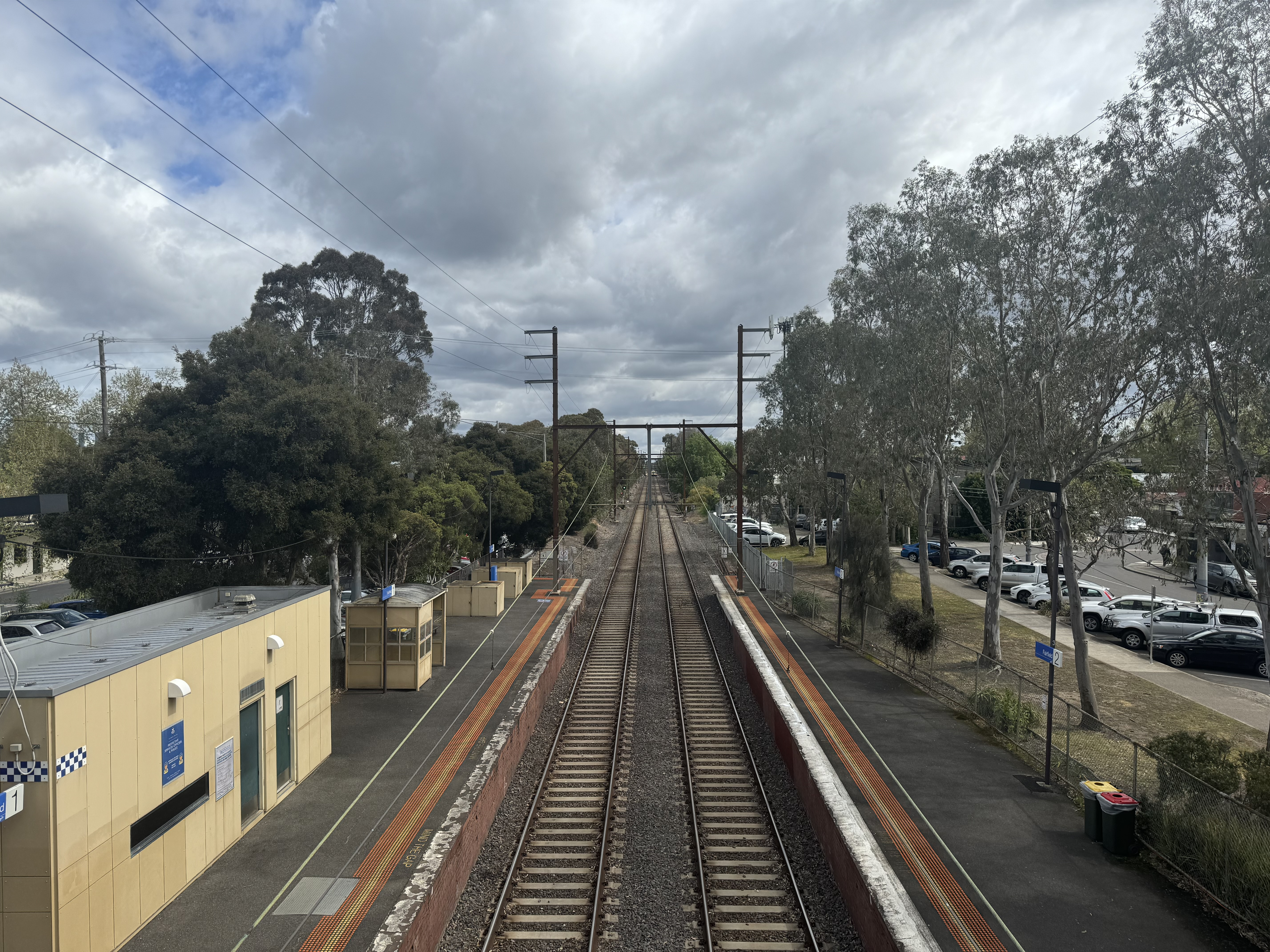
Westbound view of the station platforms, taken from the pedestrian overpass, September 2024

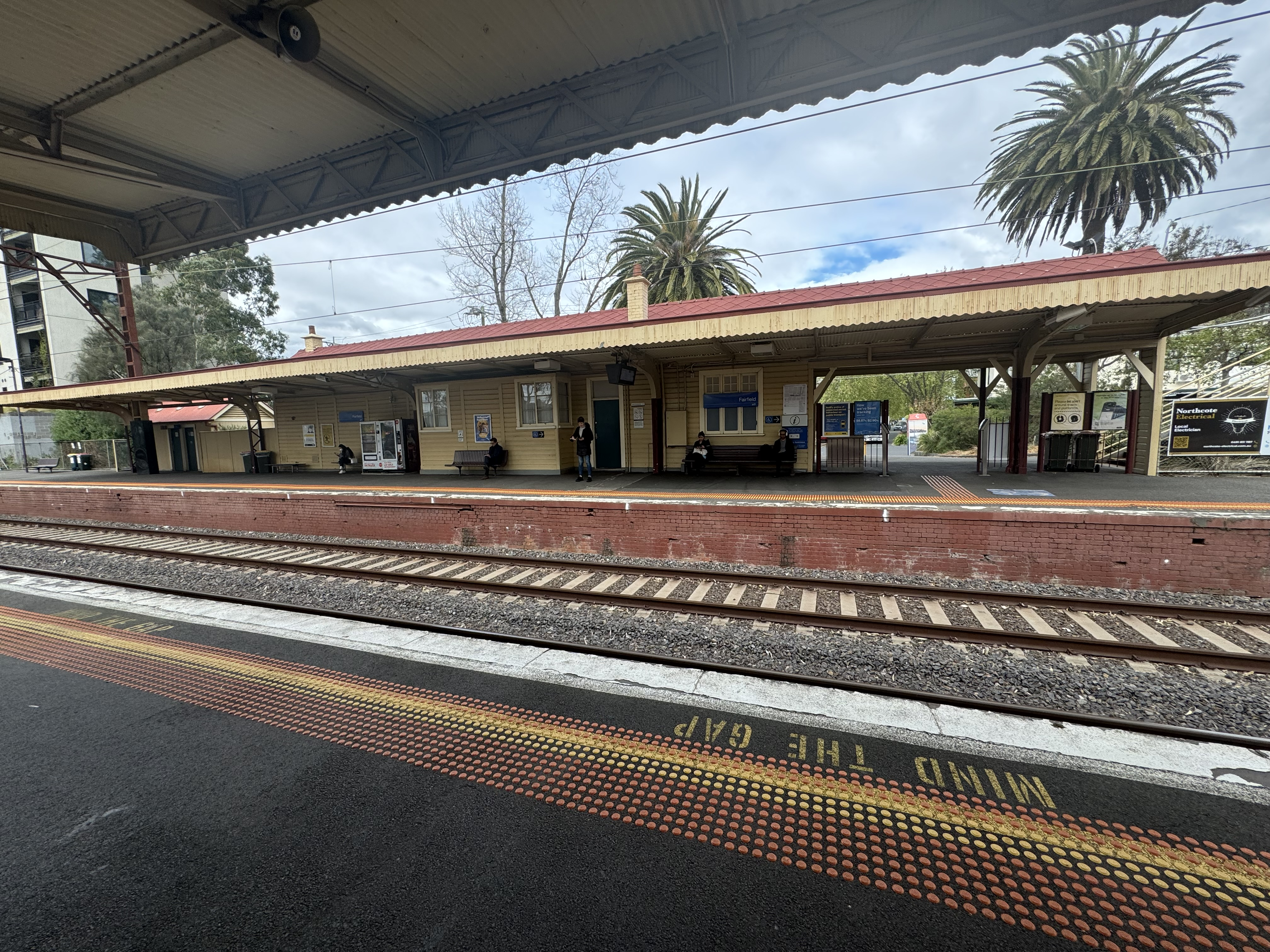
Station building on Platform 1, September 2024

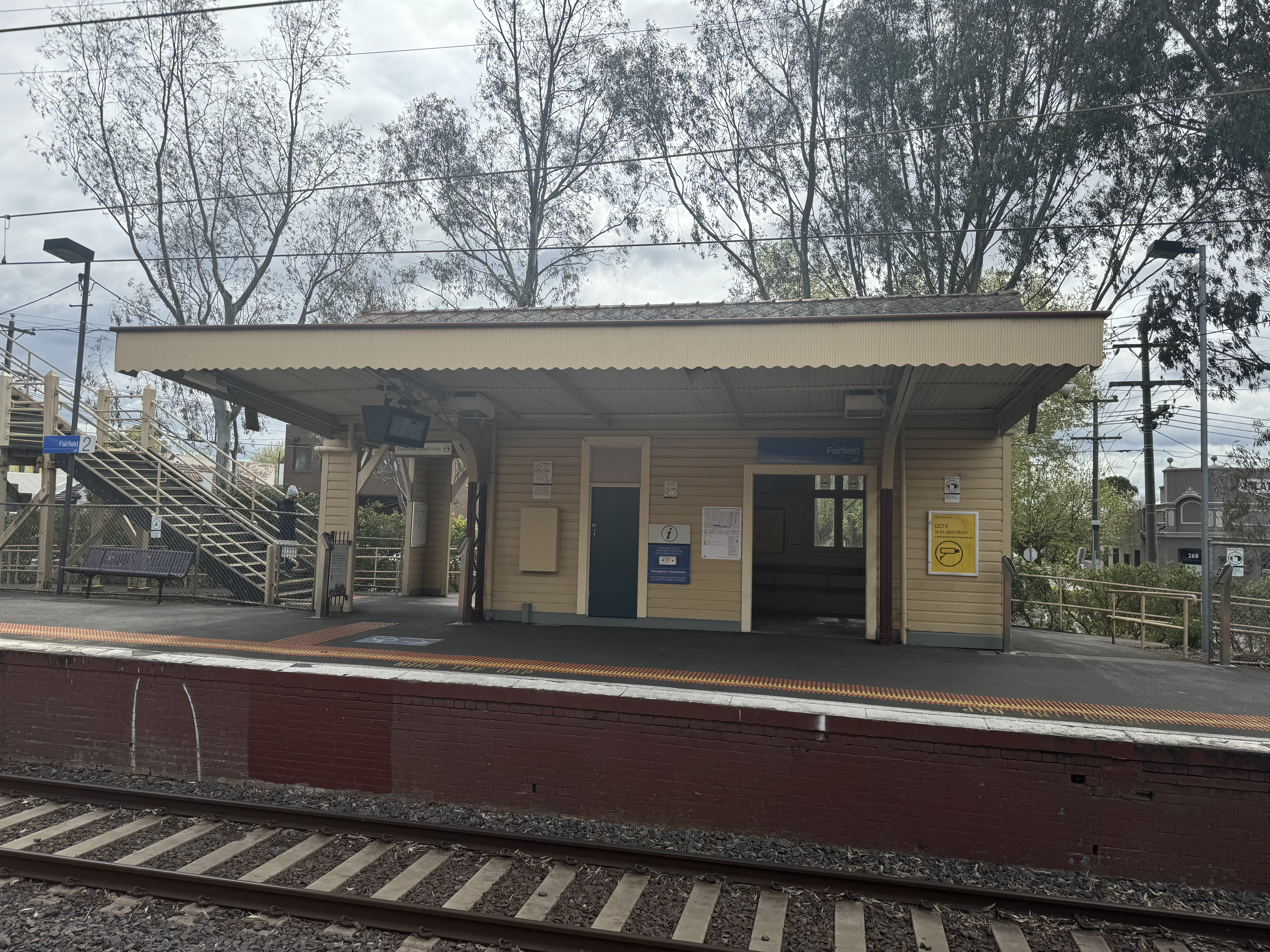
Station building on Platform 2, September 2024

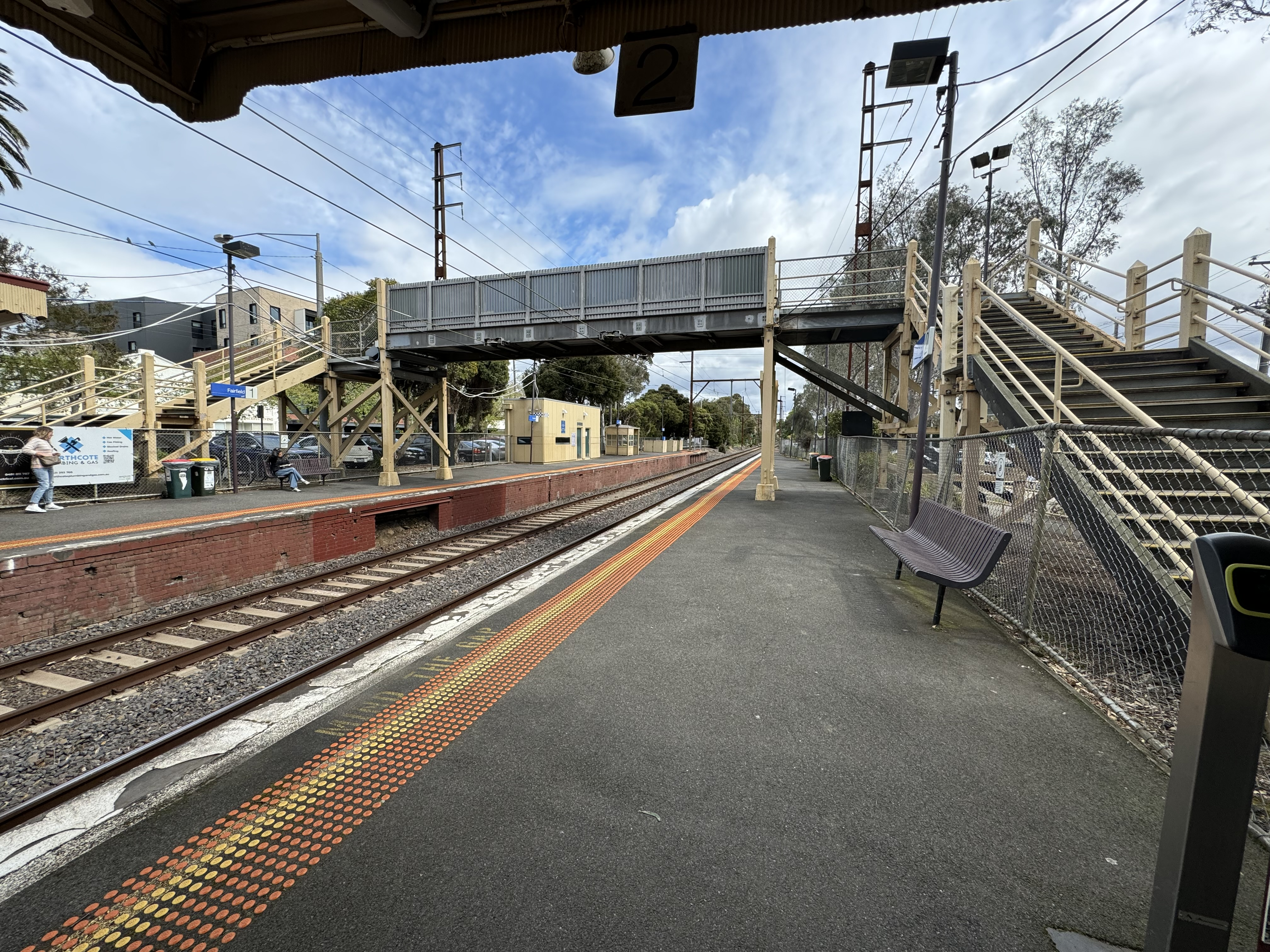
The pedestrian footbridge over the station platforms, viewed from Platform 2, September 2024

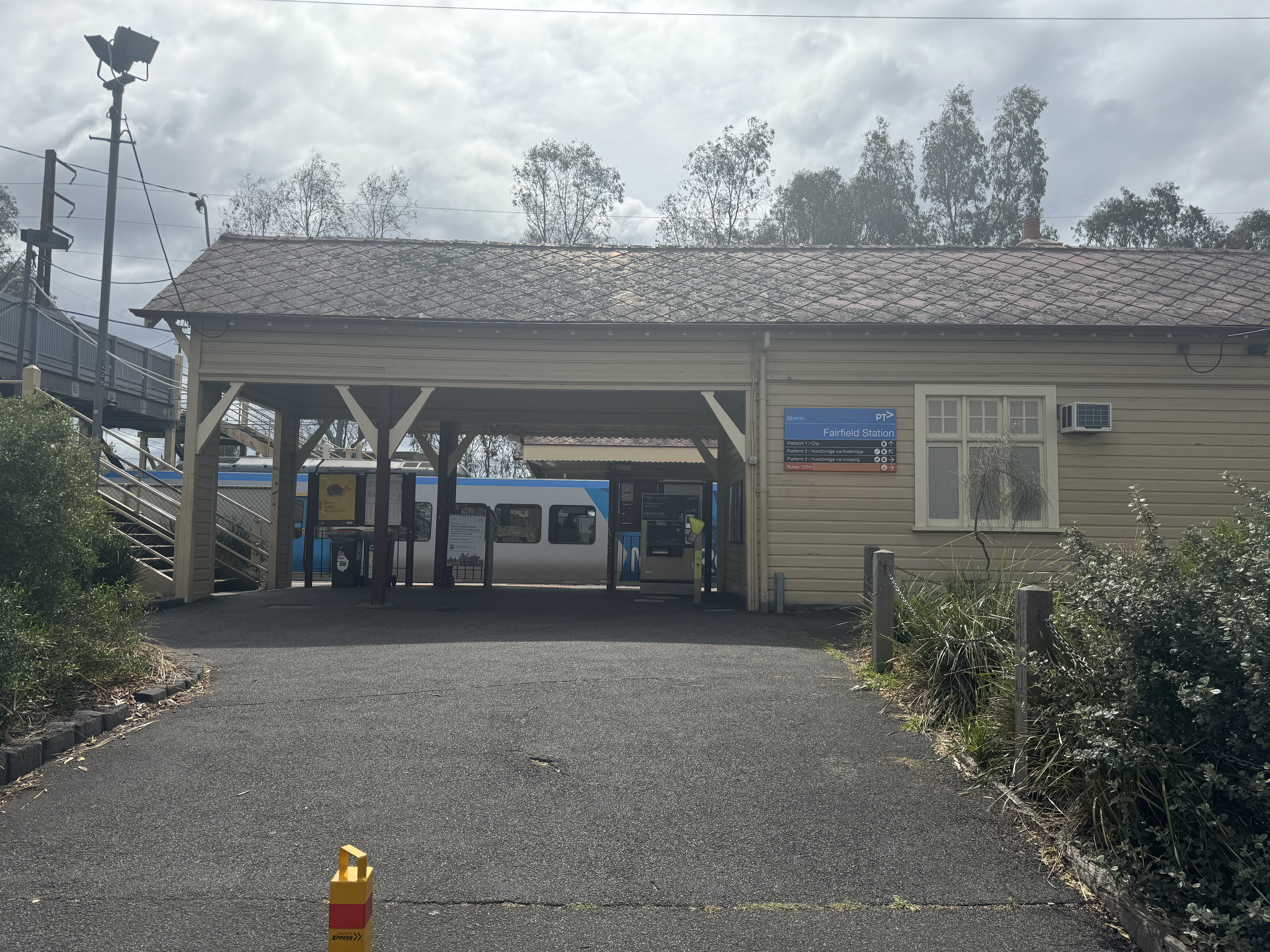
Station building and entrance to Platform 1, September 2024

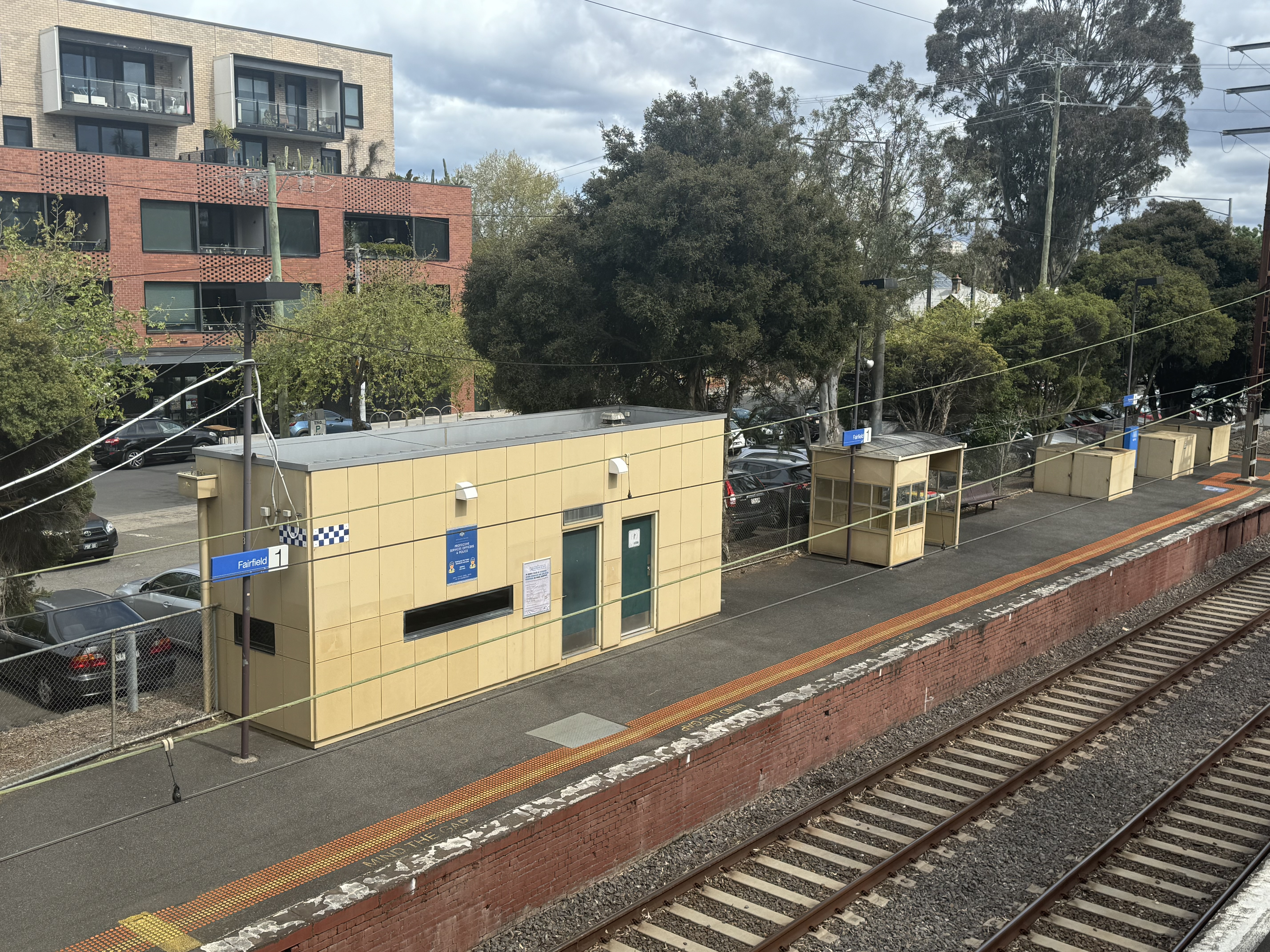
PSO box and shelter on Platform 1, September 2024

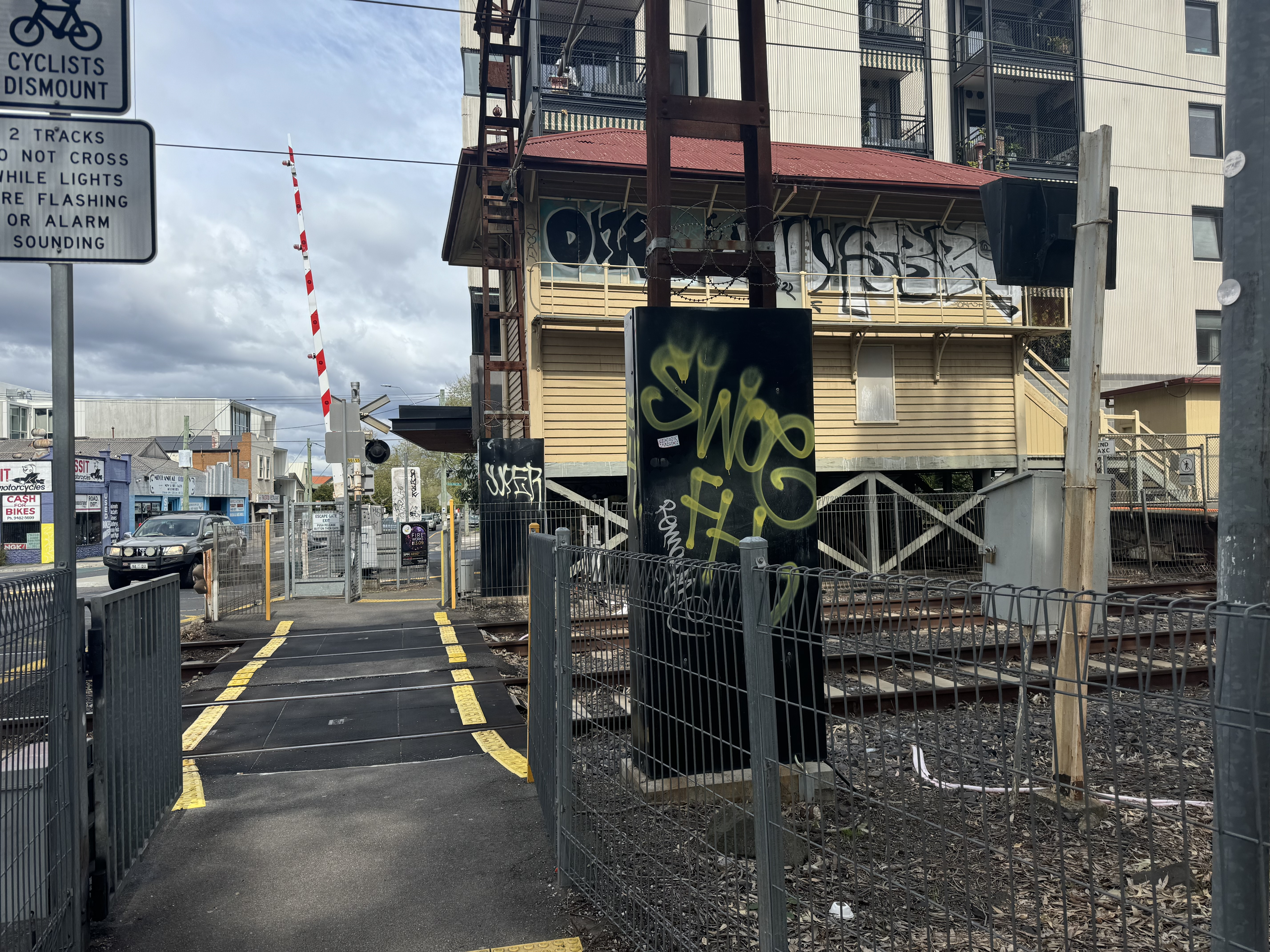
Station Street level crossing signal box and pedestrian gates, adjacent to the station, September 2024
