= Shenley railway station =

Former railway station in Victoria, Australia

Coordinates: 37°49′17″S 145°4′1″E

Shenley
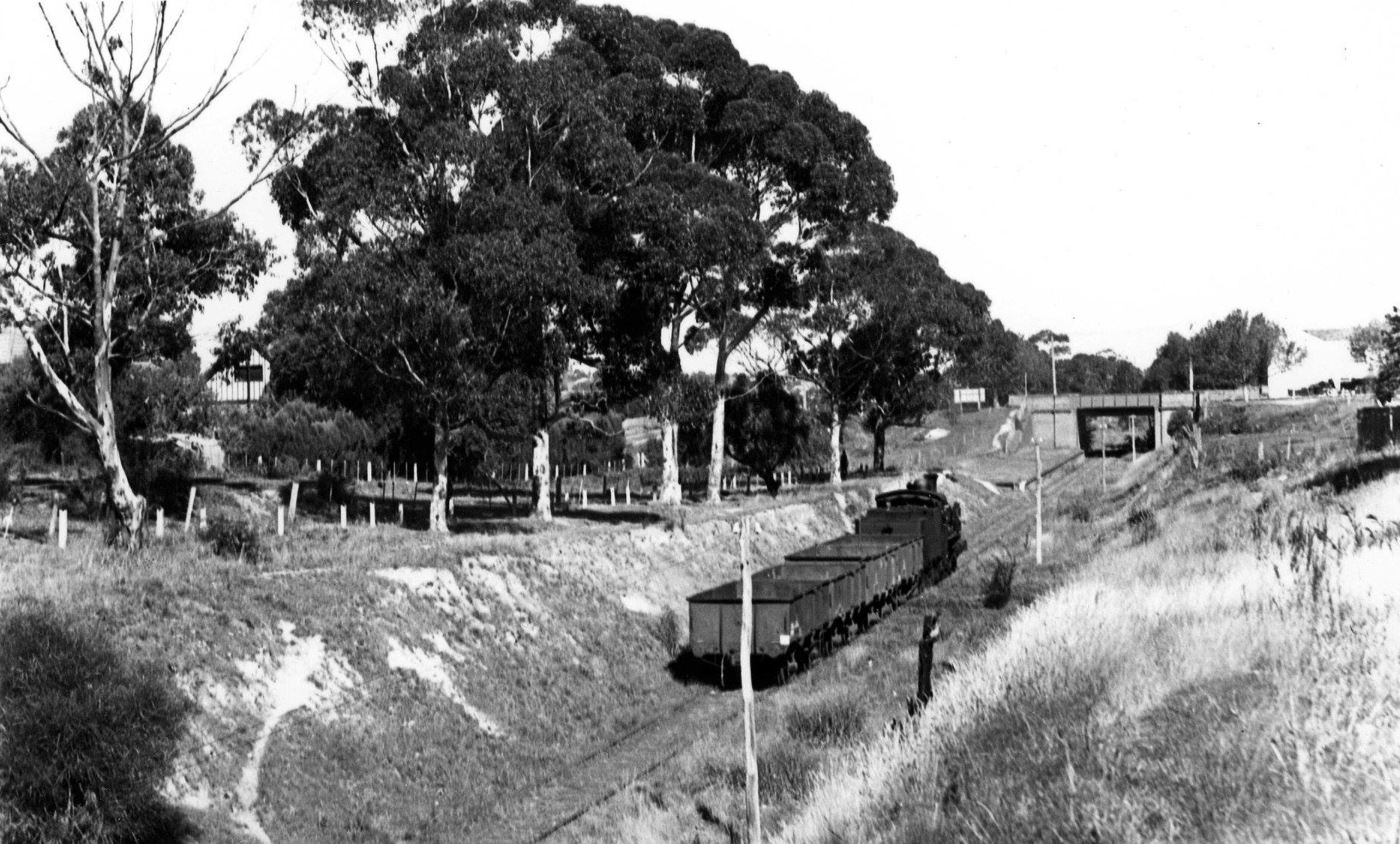
- Goods train at Shenley railway station in the 1940s

General information
- Lines: Alamein, Outer Circle
- Platforms: 2

History
- Opened: 24 March 1891
- Closed: 9 October 1927

Services
Preceding station	Disused railways	Following station
Roystead towards Fairfield	Outer Circle line	East Camberwell towards Oakleigh
Junction	Loop to the Lilydale line	Canterbury
Roystead towards East Kew	Alamein line	East Camberwell towards Ashburton
	List of closed railway stations in Melbourne	
Location

Shenley was a railway station on the Outer Circle railway line located in the suburb of Canterbury, Melbourne, Victoria, Australia. It was located immediately to the north of the Canterbury Road overbridge.

Opened on 24 March 1891, it had two side platforms on a loop, with the main platform located on the east side of the line. The station was closed with the rest of the Outer Circle on 12 April 1893, but was reopened on 14 May 1900, to serve passengers on the so-called Deepdene Dasher shuttle service. After reopening it only had one track and a platform on the east side of the line. The station was finally closed on 9 October 1927, along with the passenger service, but goods trains to East Kew railway station passed through the site until 1943. After closure, the platform structure remained but no buildings were present.

A junction existed 200 yards (180 m) to the south of the station, with the main line going to Riversdale railway station and the loop line towards Canterbury station on the Lilydale railway line. This connection was only open between 15 March 1892 and 12 April 1893. An 18-lever frame was provided at the Lilydale line connection, later reduced to 16 levers. In 1911 a spoil siding was constructed north of Shenley, between the Canterbury and Mont Albert Road road overbridges. Earth fill obtained by widening the cutting at that point was used in the regrading of the Lilydale line.
