= Roystead railway station =

Former railway station in Victoria, Australia

Coordinates: 37°49′2″S 145°3′56″E

Roystead

General information
- Line: Alamein
- Platforms: 1
- Tracks: 1

History
- Opened: 14 May 1900; 126 years ago
- Closed: 9 October 1927; 98 years ago

Services
Preceding station	Disused railways	Following station
Deepdene towards East Kew	Alamein line	Shenley towards Ashburton
	List of closed railway stations in Melbourne	
Location

Roystead was a railway station on the Outer Circle railway line, in the suburb of Canterbury, in Melbourne, Australia. It was opened on 14 May 1900 (as Stanley) to serve passengers on the so-called Deepdene Dasher shuttle service. This section of the line was in a cutting, and the station, with a single platform on the west side, was located south of a bridge, with red brick abutments and a green-painted iron superstructure, which took Mont Albert Road over the railway.

Originally named after the adjacent Stanley Grove, the name was altered to Balwyn in 1902, and finally to Roystead in September 1923, after the white Victorian style house nearby, which is now used by Camberwell Grammar, a private boys' school. The station closed on 9 October 1927, along with the passenger service, but goods trains to East Kew railway station passed through the site until 1943. In this period the platform structure remained but no buildings were present.
