= Canterbury Mansions =

Heritage-listed former hotel and guest house in Melbourne, Victoria, Australia

- Location of the complex in Greater Metropolitan Melbourne
- Former names: Malone's Family Hotel; Canterbury Club Hotel

General information
- Status: Completed
- Type: Hotel (1889–1920); Guest house (c. 1921–????); Apartments (since ????– )
- Architectural style: Victorian Free Classical
- Location: 208 Canterbury Road, Canterbury, City of Boroondara, Melbourne, Victoria, Australia
- Coordinates: 37°49′28″S 145°04′59″E
- Groundbreaking: 1 May 1889
- Completed: 1889; 137 years ago
- Cost: £30,000
- Owner: William Malone (1889–c. 1921); Melbourne & Metropolitan Tramways Board (1951–1966); anor

Technical details
- Material: Bricks
- Floor count: 3 plus tower

Design and construction
- Architect: William G. Wolf

Victorian Heritage Register
- Official name: Canterbury Mansions
- Type: Registered place
- Designated: 30 October 1991
- Reference no.: VHR H0869
- Heritage overlay no.: HO29
- Categories: Residential buildings (private); Recreation and Entertainment; Commercial

The Canterbury Mansions is a former hotel, former guest house, and now a series of apartments and retail complex, located at the junction of Canterbury and Malang roads, in Canterbury, in the City of Boroondara, in the inner eastern suburbs of Melbourne, in Victoria, Australia.

Built in 1889 on the traditional lands of the Wurundjeri people, the complex was added to the Victorian Heritage Register on 30 October 1991 in recognition of its historical and architectural significance.

== Description ==
=== Public house ===
The foundation stone for the public house called the Malone's Family Hotel, later known as the Canterbury Club Hotel, was laid on 1 May 1889 by Mrs William Malone, reflecting the suburban development boom which followed the Canterbury railway station that began operating in 1882. Designed in the Victorian Free Classical style, the architect was William W. Wolf, considered an expert in hotel design, who designed many other hotels, including The Palace in Camberwell and Surrey Lodge in Surrey Hills. The portraits of William Gladstone on the window keystones were probably a tribute to the Irish Home Rule movement.

The first proprietor was William Malone in 1892, then Fredrick Goldhawk in 1897 followed by several others until Alfred Hodgens bought it in 1903. Later, it was mostly in the hands of the Malones, hence the name Malone's Canterbury Club Hotel until 1 January 1921 when his license was revoked. The Temperance movement in Australia had existed from the early days of the settlement as part of an international movement. In October 1920, Victorian electors voted on a Local Option Poll to decide whether hotels in their district should be closed or reduced. The municipalities of Box Hill and Camberwell achieved the sixty percent vote required resulting in the pub's forced closure. Malone received some compensation and sold the building.

=== Guest house ===
The building was renamed as the Canterbury Mansions and became a guest house. An advertisement for lodging published in The Argus in 1931 described rooms:

A A-At Canterbury Mansions 1 Min. Canterbury Stn., 19 Min. City, H.W.S., gar., frns ex. table; red. from 35/. R. and b'fast opt. W1483.

— The Argus advertisement, 22 September 1931.

A subsequent application to re-licence the hotel in 1939 was withdrawn, following local support for the Temperance movement. In 1947, the building was sold for £9,300; and it was reported that, in 1889, the hotel cost £30,000 to build.

In 1951, the Melbourne & Metropolitan Tramways Board purchased the 75-bed property for c.£20,000; later reported as £29,500. The Board were facing labour shortages and needed to guarantee accommodation for immigrant workers; however, their acquisition of this property—along with others—led to some community unrest as the previous lodgers were forced to find alternate accommodation. The Board sold the property in 1966.

In 1955, it was reported that another application was lodged to reopen the building as a public house, amidst community opposition.

In 1990, the stables and kitchen outbuildings remained.

=== Contemporary use ===
The property was subsequently converted for use as residential apartments on strata title. An apartment, listed for sale in 2023, was described as having "…traditional regal proportions, high ceilings and leadlight windows… sash windows, cast iron fireplaces, ornate arches and ceiling roses… formal lounge, three bedrooms… open plan living, dining and kitchen… glassed rooftop terrace… an adjoining study/office [in the tower]… spa, powder room, heating, cooling, and parking [for two cars]."

== See also ==
- Architecture of Melbourne
- List of places on the Victorian Heritage Register in the City of Boroondara
- Temperance movement in Australia
