= Maling Road =

Road in Melbourne, Australia

Coordinates: 37°49′30″S 145°4′55″E

Maling Road Victoria
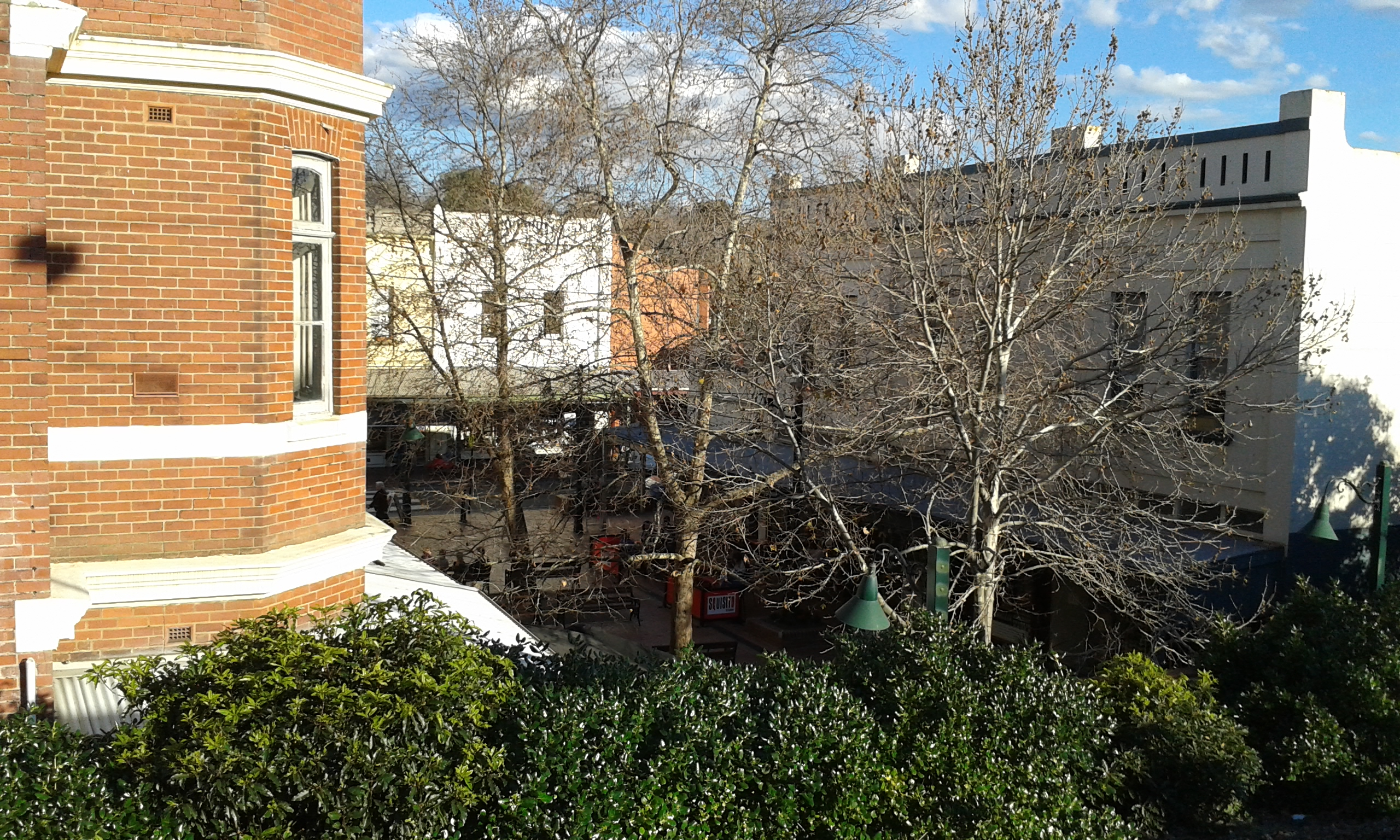
- View of Theatre Place in the Maling Road shopping strip from Canterbury railway station.

General information
- Type: Street
- Location: Melbourne, Victoria

Major junctions
- South end: Prospect Hill Road
- NW end: Canterbury Road, Surrey Hills, Melbourne

Location(s)
- LGA(s): City of Boroondara
- Major suburbs: Canterbury; Surrey Hills

Maling Road is a popular shopping strip in Canterbury, Victoria, Australia. It contains over fifty Edwardian-style shops in a pseudo-village setting. Its location was chosen due to its proximity to Canterbury railway station.

== History ==
The present-day shopping strip has its roots in the construction of the railway line at Canterbury railway station in 1882. Although most buildings in the area near the intersection with Canterbury Road date from the early 1900s, some were constructed before this time.

In the 1970s after the grade separation of the railway line across Canterbury Road, there were proposals to demolish large parts of the shopping centre and construct a supermarket. This was met with resistance from the local community and the project successfully stopped. A council proposal to turn part of the street into a pedestrian mall was also scrapped.
