= Deepdene railway station =

Deepdene railway station may refer to:

- Deepdene railway station, Melbourne, Australia
- Dorking Deepdene railway station, England - formerly known (1923–1987) as Deepdene railway station
