= Colinton (disambiguation) =

Colinton is a suburb of Edinburgh, Scotland.

Colinton may also refer to:

- Colinton, Alberta, a hamlet in Alberta, Canada
- Colinton, New South Wales, a locality in the Monaro region of New South Wales, Australia
- Colinton, Queensland, a locality in Somerset Region of Queensland, Australia
- Colinton (house), a heritage-listed house in Melbourne, Victoria, Australia
