= Deepdene railway station, Melbourne =

Former railway station in Melbourne, Victoria, Australia

Coordinates: 37°48′35.9″S 145°3′46.8″E

Deepdene
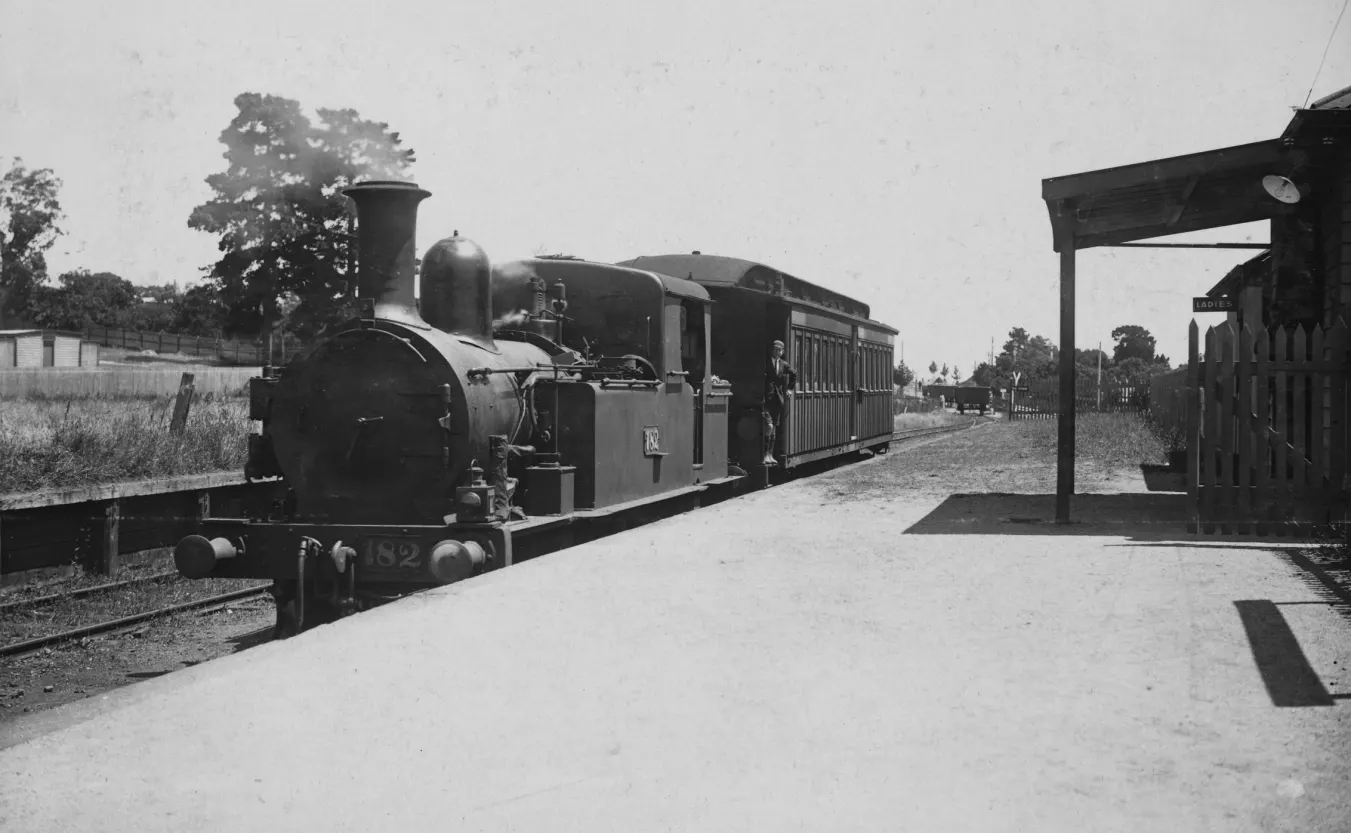
- Deepdene railway station in 1926

General information
- Lines: Alamein, Outer Circle
- Platforms: 2

History
- Opened: 24 March 1891; 135 years ago
- Closed: 9 October 1927; 98 years ago

Services
Preceding station	Disused railways	Following station
East Kew towards Fairfield	Outer Circle line	Roystead towards Oakleigh
East Kew towards East Kew	Alamein line	Roystead towards Ashburton
	List of closed railway stations in Melbourne	
Location

Deepdene was a railway station on the Outer Circle railway line, located in the suburb of Balwyn, Melbourne, Australia. Located between Abercrombie Street and Whitehorse Road, it was opened on 24 March 1891, along with the line though it, and was named after the adjacent Deepdene House.

== Facilities ==
There was a crossing loop on the single track, with two side platforms. A station building was situated on the east platform. The loop was removed after the initial closure, but replaced on reopening. For a time, the station was also open for goods.

== History ==
Opened on 24 March 1891, it was named after the nearby Deepdene House. The station was first closed, along with the line, on 12 April 1893. However, it reopened on 14 May 1900, becoming the terminus of the reopened section of the Outer Circle line from Riversdale station. It was served by what became known, ironically, as the Deepdene Dasher, a shuttle service from Riversdale, consisting of one or two "American-style" carriages hauled by a steam locomotive. The line was reopened beyond Deepdene on 11 February 1925, to allow a goods service to be run to East Kew station.

In the 1920s, almost all Melbourne suburban lines were electrified, but the lack of traffic on the Deepdene line meant that it was excluded from the electrification program. The Deepdene Dasher became one of the last steam-hauled passenger services in suburban Melbourne. On 15 August 1926, the final steam-hauled Deepdene Dasher ran, being replaced next day by two AEC railmotors coupled back to back. The passenger service was withdrawn on 9 October 1927, and the station closed to traffic, with the train being replaced by a bus service from East Camberwell station to Deepdene.

The station building was destroyed by fire in 1927, which was believed to have been caused by a swagman who had set up camp in the waiting room. The former departmental residence, which was located alongside the Whitehorse Road level crossing, was demolished in 1938 to make way for a timber yard. Until 1943, goods services to East Kew continued to pass through the site of Deepdene station.
