= Canterbury Girls' Secondary College =

Single-sex state school in Canterbury, Victoria, Australia

Location
- Canterbury, Victoria; Australia; 37.8200°S 145.0694°E

Information
- Type: Single-sex, day school, State school
- Motto: Fervet Opus
- Established: 1928 as East Camberwell Domestic Arts School, "Mangarra". 1989 as Canterbury Girls' Secondary College
- School district: Canterbury, Victoria
- Principal: Julia Niamh
- Years: 7–12
- Enrollment: 988
- Houses: Flynn (blue and pink); Cattanach (green and purple); Brennan (yellow and black); McDonald (red and white)
- Colours: Blue, white and yellow
- Website: Canterbury Girls' Secondary College

Canterbury Girls Secondary College is a government all-girls secondary school located on Mangarra Rd in Canterbury, Victoria, Australia. The school provides an education from Year 7 to Year 12.

The school consists of one campus located in the suburb of Canterbury approximately nine kilometres from Melbourne's Central Business District. It is a non-selective school and its school zone includes the suburbs of Canterbury, Camberwell, Surrey Hills, Balwyn, Kew and Hawthorn. In 2025 the school had an enrolment of 775. The school offers VCE and VET subjects and has special programs in music, sport and university enhancement.

== History ==
It was established in 1928 as East Camberwell Domestic Arts School, catering for girls and offering courses up to Year 10. It became Camberwell Girls' High School in 1958, having a number of official names throughout the 1950s. In 1961 the name Canterbury Girls' High School was adopted. In 1989, after consultation with the school community, the school's name was changed in line with Government policy to Canterbury Girls' Secondary College. It remains a girls state school.

Canterbury Girls' Secondary College was ranked 17th out of all state secondary schools in Victoria based on VCE results in 2018.

In 2021, during school hours, a wall collapsed sending bricks and glass 'crashing to the floor' prompting calls to increase funding for building maintenance in government schools. No one was hurt in the incident.

== Sport ==
The school competes in interschool sports in the Boroondara Secondary Division and the Eastern Metropolitan Region.

== Music ==
The school's music program includes concert bands, string orchestras and chamber groups and also has a strong choral tradition. In 2024 the school's Cantabella choir won three sections in the Royal South Street Eisteddfod including best overall secondary school choir. In 2025 the Cantabella choir were awarded platinum in the Victorian School Music Festival.

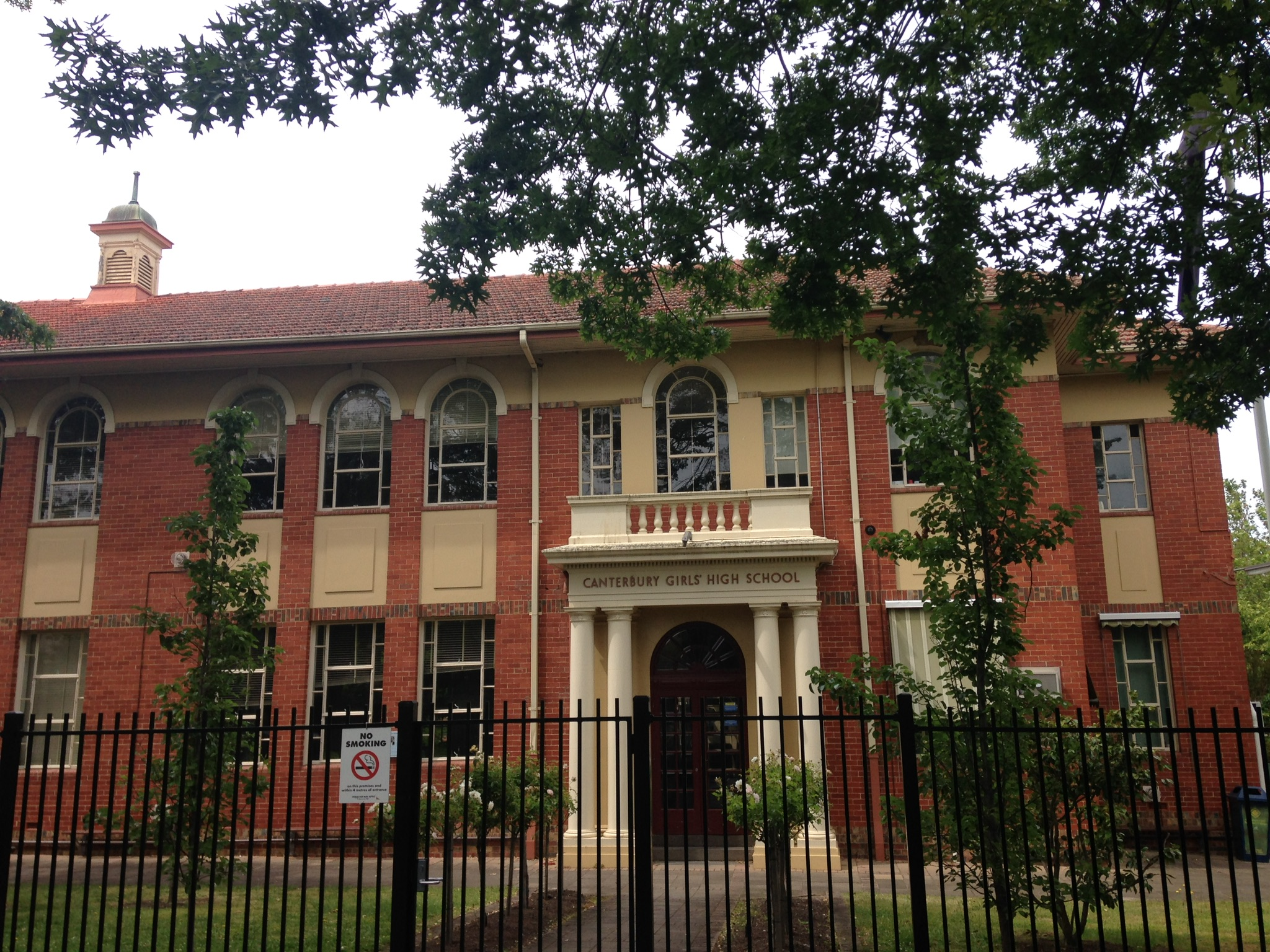
Canterbury Girls' Secondary College entrance

== Notable alumni ==
- Rosé (real name Roseanne Park), MBE – member of South Korean girl group Blackpink
- Suzanne Cory, AC, FAA, FRS – molecular biologist
- Esther Hannaford – actress
- Kate Kendall – actress
