= Victorian Railways American type carriage =

Railway carriages from Australia

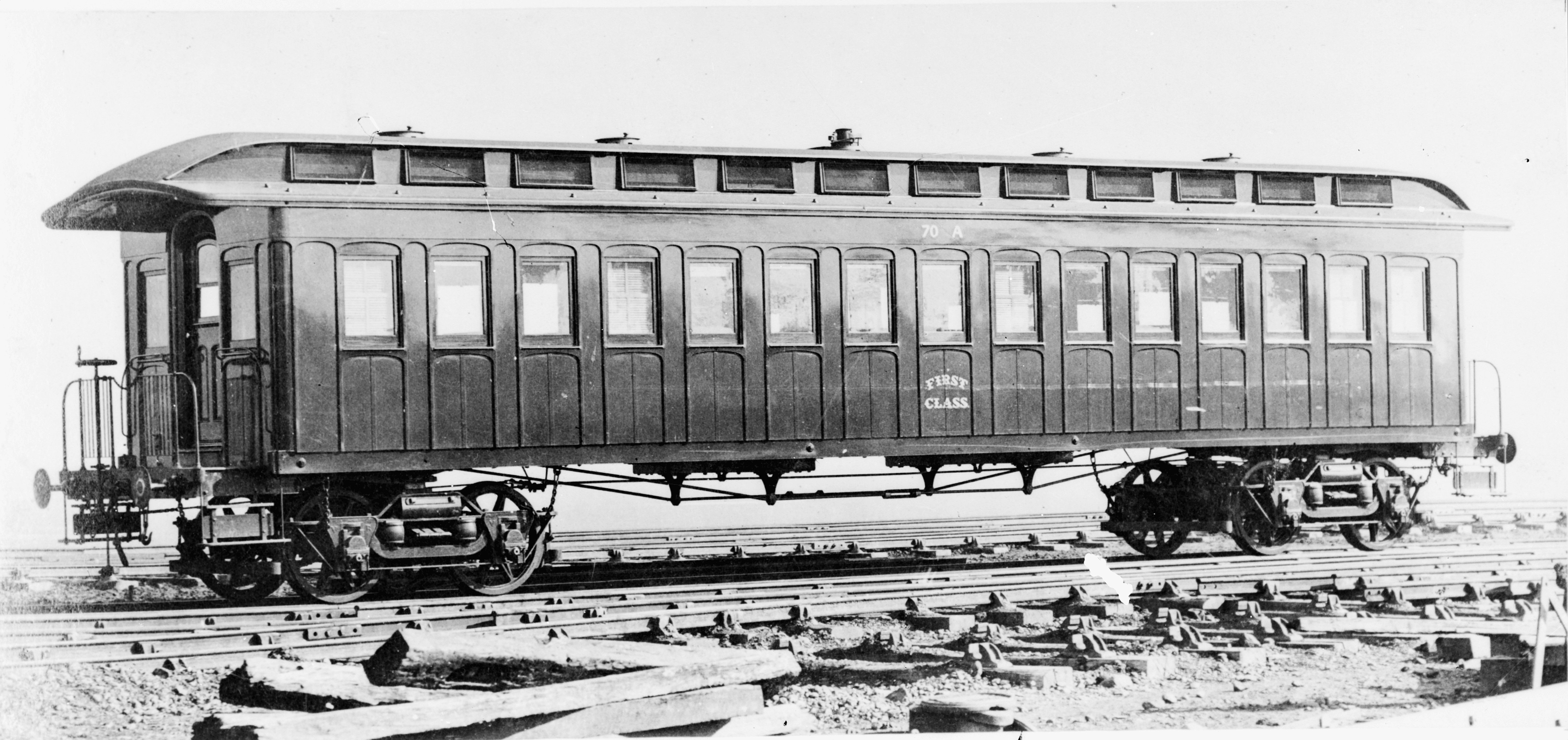
- American Saloon car 70A, later 2A^{A}.
- Constructed: 1874–1881
- Fleet numbers: 25 + 2
- Operator: Victorian Railways

Specifications
- Car body construction: Timber
- Car length: 44 ft 0 in (13.41 m) over body, 50 ft 8 in (15.44 m), over coupling points
- Width: 9 ft 7 in (2.92 m)
- Height: 12 ft 8.5 in (3.87 m)
- Weight: 16 LT 3 cwt 0 qtr (16.41 t) (some later up to 19 long tons)
- Bogies: 33 ft 9 in (10.29 m) apart
- Coupling system: Screw
- Track gauge: 5 ft 3 in (1,600 mm)

The American type carriage was a family of rail cars made by Victorian Railways, an Australian state rail operator.

== History ==
When the Victorian Railways first started looking into bogie passenger carriage design, Britain did not have many examples to follow so the styles selected were copied from American railroads of the era. Between 1874 and 1892 a total of 29 American saloon-style carriages entered service, all bar four to a standard design.

The initial order was for one each of a first- and second-class carriage, delivered to the Victorian Railways in 1874 and entering service the following year. These were built to the prevailing bogie saloon style of the time, with end platforms and stairs to access the cars from ground level.

The cars were not popular in service. An 1877 editorial in the Ballarat Courier described the new Albert car as "utterly unsuited to our requirements", due to poor springing causing a rocking motion. The paper further commented that the cars were only suited for short, high-traffic operation like the Williamstown railway line or event traffic to Flemington, because the saloon layout of the cars made private discussions impossible and there was no space for travellers to play cards or board games while travelling. Additionally, the car was poorly ventilated and drew in smoke from the locomotive exhaust.

Compared to then-ordinary fixed wheel carriages, which weighed about 6 long tons (6.1 t) and carried 32 to 40 passengers, the American saloon cars weighed about three times as much for only twice the capacity, which was speculated to significantly increase coal consumption. The single-class nature of the carriages was speculated to make them uneconomic particularly on Mixed trains, where only a small number of first and second class passengers presented for each service. It was, however, recognised that the saloon cars could be used to provide sleeping accommodation for multi-day group trips.

Vincent notes that circa 1885 about half the fleet were fitted with Woods' patent hydraulic brakes, and around 1889 the whole fleet were upgraded to Westinghouse air brakes. There is no obvious pattern to which vehicles had the hydraulic brakes fitted, so it is possible that most or all cars were fitted and the remaining source records are incomplete.

=== Pattern cars ===
The pattern carriages were supplied by the Gilbert, Bush & Co. in New York, and imported in sections then assembled on delivery to Melbourne. They were first trialled between Melbourne and Sunbury on 1 April 1875 and reportedly performed admirably, notably as a first class carriage and a second class carriage. On entry to service they were described as being painted dark claret, with light green and yellow panels, and silver mouldings fitted. The cars were described as having excellent ventilation and the internal finish was likened to a Royal State Carriage. Seats were upholstered in scarlet plush, and the window blinds were whitewood lattices. The end balconies were considered a feature for passengers who wished to observe the countryside while travelling, and the seating arrangements were considered much more comfortable than existing stock. A cord attached to a bell could be used to communicate with the guard at any time.

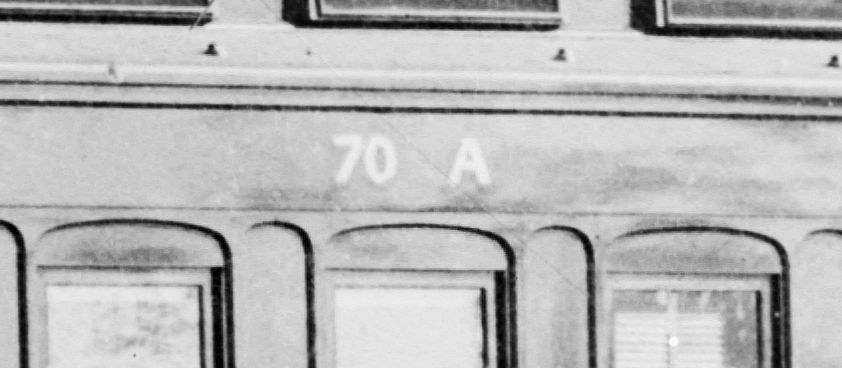
Zoom in of photograph of American Saloon car 70A, later 2A^{A}.

An early photo shows the first class carriage as 70A, but by 1886 it had been reclassed as 2A^{A}. The number was chosen due to car 1A^{A}, a non-American eight-wheeled car which had been acquired as 21A in the purchase of the Melbourne and Hobson's Bay Railway Company. That car would go on to become 11B^{B} then workmens sleeper 9WW, finally being scrapped in 1957. Despite having been built for second class duties, the second carriage entered service as 1AB^{AB} and was used as a composite first and second class vehicle.

=== Local construction ===
An additional 23 cars were built to the same design in 1879-1881, entering service as first class cars 4-14A^{A}, composite cars 2 and 3 AB^{AB}, and second class 1-10B^{B}.

First class cars 4, 5, 6A^{A} and second class cars 2, 3, 4 and 5B^{B} were built by Phillip Bevan in La Trobe Street in the Melbourne CBD. 7, 8, 14 A^{A}, 2 and 3 AB^{AB} and 10B^{B} (Note: Vincent records 10B^{B} as being built in Williamstown; the 1914 rolling stock book clarifies it was Williamstown Workshops.) were built at the Williamstown Workshops, and 9, 10, 11, 12 and 13A^{A} and 1, 6, 7, 8 and 9B^{B} were built by Wright & Edwards. Victoria, 1 and 2ABD^{ABD} were built at Newport Workshops. Albert was built by Phoenix Foundry in Ballarat.

=== Composite conversions ===
Between 1892 and 1896 all cars were converted to AB^{AB} composite format, with numbers allocated on an as-converted basis. The new group was 1-3, 8-20, 23-26, 35-36 and 49-51, with other composite cars filling the gaps. In 1895 car 8AB^{AB} was fitted with a booking office compartment.

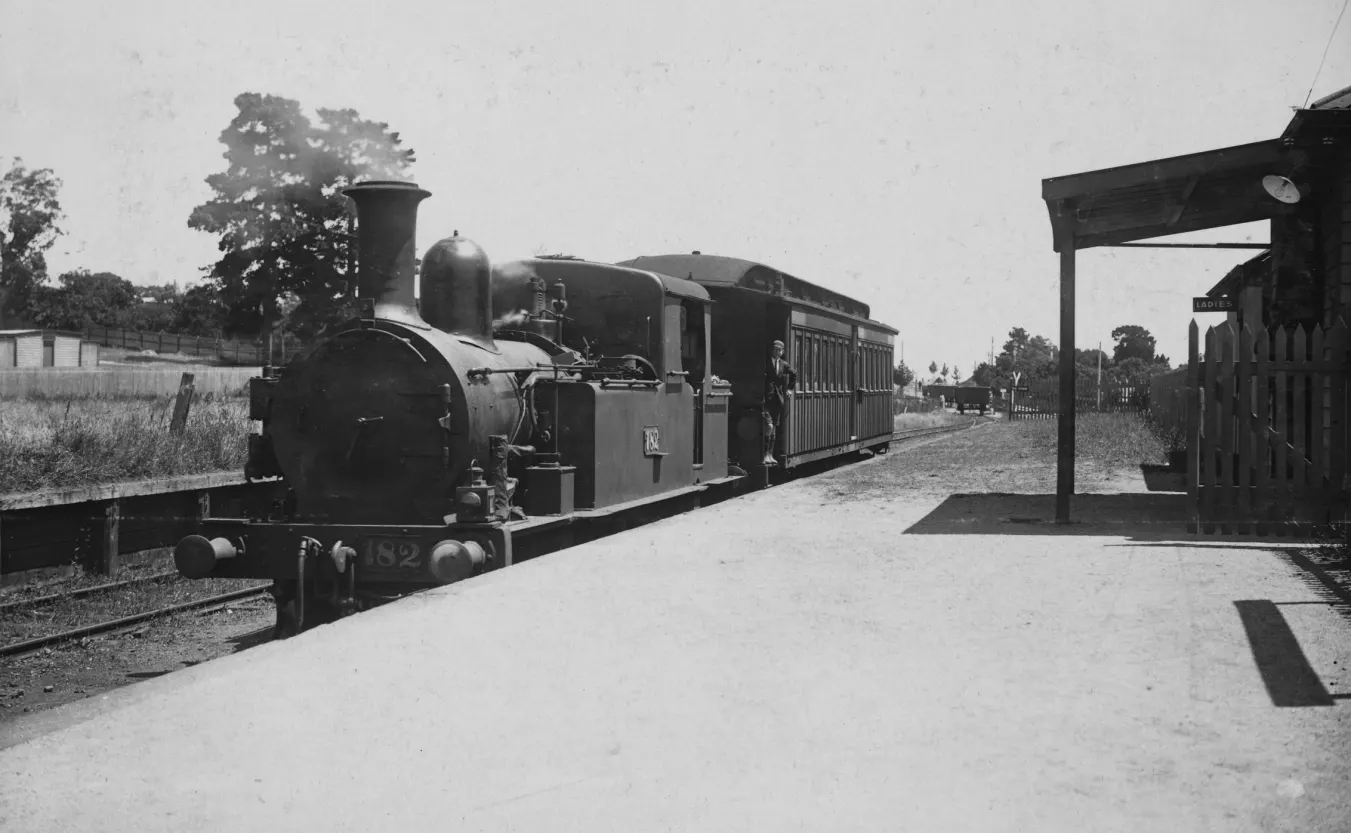
The Deepdene Dasher steam train at Deepdene station, 1926. The carriage may be 10ABC, if the allocation of 49AB^{AB} was retained through 47AB without swapping for a classmate.

In 1906 cars 8 and 20 were converted to second class only, as 10B^{B} and 73B^{B}. In 1907 49AB^{AB} was rebuilt for use on the Ashburton-Deepdene portion of the Outer Circle railway line.

Vincent notes that around 1902-1904, at least three cars (2 (Note: 2AB^{AB} is shown as a normal saloon car, not a Mallee car, in the 1914 list.), 9 and 36AB^{AB}) were converted to what became the "Mallee" format. This matches the opening of the railway line to Mildura railway station in late 1903. The Mallee car conversion meant removing all internal seating and partitions, and filling the space with six and a half new compartments. From the Smoking end, the new configuration was a men's W.C., then one Smoking and two non-smoking second class compartments with a total of 30 seats, then a Ladies' second class compartment with eight seats and a passageway at the non-corridor side to a second lavatory. Next was a smaller Ladies' first class compartment with only two seats and a W,C. backing on to the other one, then a first class non-smoking and a first class smoking compartment each with room for eight passengers, and finally a fourth W.C. Internal swinging doors were provided in the corridor between each smoking compartment and the non-smoking hallway, and between the first and second class carriage portions. The Mallee cars were also provided with steps at each end platform to allow climbing up from shorter or no platforms, and canvas covers over the end platforms to help deal with sand drifts harsh weather.

In 1910 bogie passenger carriage codes were simplified overall, so AB^{AB} was reduced to simply AB, and cars were renumbered to fill gaps. The new sequence was therefore 1–3, 8–18, 21–24, 33–34 and 47–49; the two B^{B} cars kept their numbers but were recoded to B. They were joined by 22AB to 74B in 1927.

Five of the AB cars were converted to ABC, with a central guard's compartment fitted, in 1925. This allowed the carriages to be used on low-traffic lines as the rear vehicle of mixed trains, rather than needing a separate van for the guard. The converted cars were 1, 12, 14, 47 and 49, becoming 6, 7, 9, 10 and 8ABC.

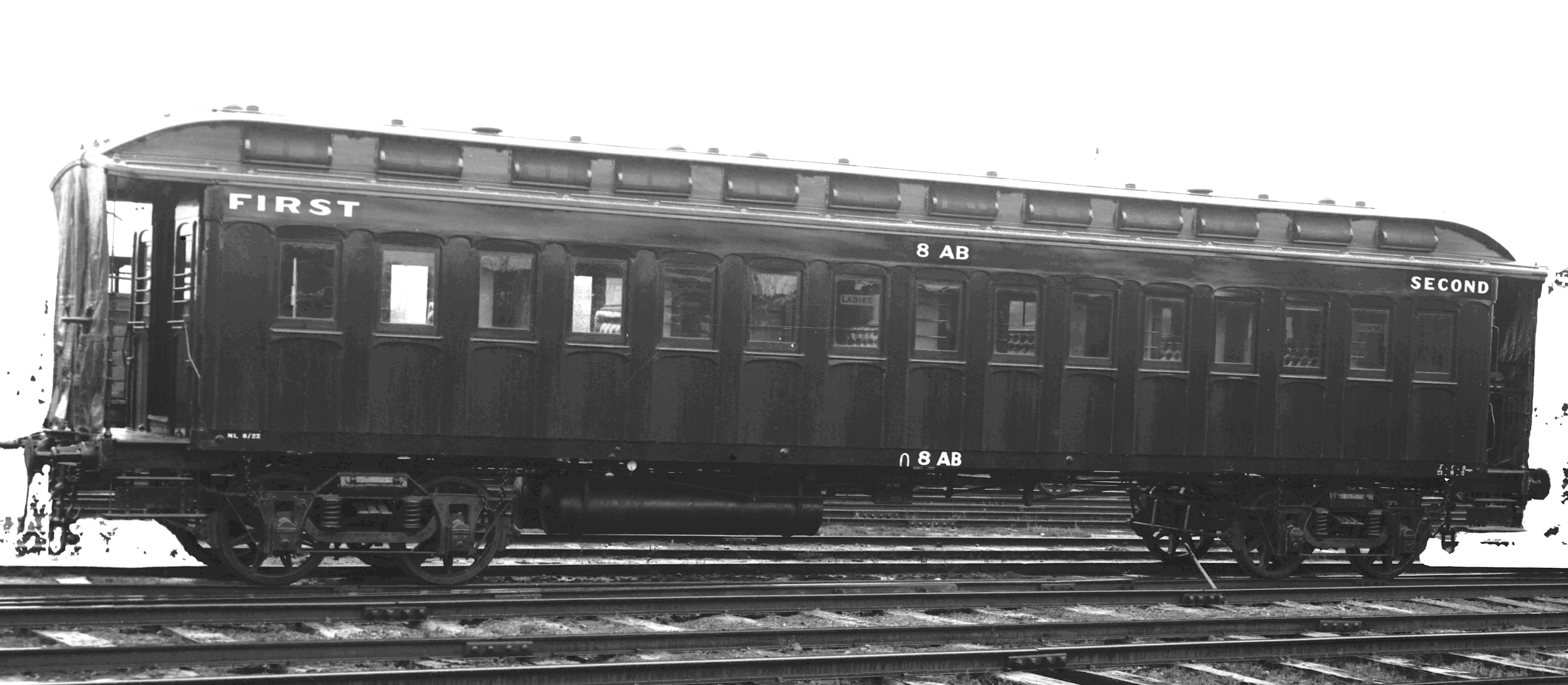
8AB as a Mallee car, circa 1920s

As of 1914, many of the cars had been internally reconfigured.

Class	Nos in 1914	1^{st} class	2^{nd} class	Layout	Notes
AB	8, 11, 13, 17, 24, 34	18	38	Corridor and seven compartments	“Mallee” type, stairs for ground level access. Four internal lavatories.
AB	9, 15, 47, 48	20	32	Saloon, end booking office	This is the configuration used on the Deepdene service.
AB	1, 2, 3, 10, 14, 16, 18, 21, 22, 23, 33	28	36	Saloon	
AB	12, 49	20	32	Two saloons, central booking office	
B	10	-	56	Saloon, end booking office	
B	73	-	68	Saloon	
ABC	1, 2	24	20	Two compartments either end of central guard’s compartment	See below; short body variant
ABC	5	30	28	Two saloons, central guard’s compartment	See below; ex Albert
Victoria	Unnumbered	20	-	Two saloons, central guard’s compartment	See below

At some point between 1914 (when the above list was created) and 1925/1927 respectively (when the cars were converted to other uses), cars 14 and 22AB were fitted with Stone's Electric Lighting equipment, for use on the Hurstbridge line. That line was electrified in stages, to Heidelberg in 1921, Eltham in 1923 and Hurstbridge in 1926.

Six AB cars, 2, 3, 10, 21, 23 and 33, were allocated to the Better Farming Train which started running in 1924. They were cleared of all internal fittings and arranged as saloon display cars. The train also ran with the slightly longer but generally similar car "Victoria", described below.

Sixteen cars were removed from service between 1927 and 1938, and the remaining cars were converted to workmens sleeper vehicles across 1940-1942. Cars 2, 3, 10, 15, 21, 23 and 33 became 1-7WW, 73B became 8WW, and 74B became 10WW.

=== Special cars ===
==== 39 ft 1 in (11.91 m) ABD^{ABD} cars ====
ABD^{ABD}, later ABC
- Constructed: 1891-1892
- Fleet numbers: 1, 2
- Operator: Victorian Railways

Specifications
- Car body construction: Timber
- Car length: 39 ft 1 in (11.91 m) over body, 48 ft 2 1/2 in (14.694 m), over coupling points
- Width: 8 ft 6 in (2.59 m)
- Height: 12 ft 6 1/8 in (3.81 m)
- Weight: 18 LT 16 cwt 0 qtr (19.10 t)
- Bogies: 32 ft 10 in (10.01 m) apart 6 ft 6 in (1.98 m) between axle centres
- Coupling system: Screw
- Track gauge: 5 ft 3 in (1,600 mm)

Two cars were built in 1891 and 1892 that were aesthetically similar to the Mallee type, though with a shorter body and underframe. These were classed 1 and 2ABD^{ABD}, the code indicating capacity for both first and second class passengers as well as a dedicated guard's compartment. In 1910 the two were reclassed ABC, and they remained in service until 1954 and 1959 respectively.

The cars were laid out, from the Smoking end, with an end platform and inward-swinging door to access a first class compartment, then two second class compartments (one smoking, one not) accessed only by side doors, then the central guard's compartment followed by a first class side-access compartment and another first class, end-access-only compartment. The total capacity was reported as 24 first and 20 second class passengers, plus a further eight seated on the balconies outside the first class end compartments.

Other class members, to different styles, were 3 and 4ABC built using compartment carriages without end platforms, 5ABC ex "Albert" (see below), and 6-10ABC converted from AB cars (see above), though there had been a separate 8ABC briefly in 1917. Five other cars were converted to ABC in 1914, car numbers 13 and 17-20 implying an intention to create cars 11-12 and 14-16. These would later become Swing Door EMU cars 162M and 24-27D respectively. In 1930 five final cars were converted to ABC - 8 (the third), 11, 12, 14 and 16 (but not 15). These last cars had been partially converted to electric stock, but had been returned to steam-hauled service in the late 1920s.

==== 44 ft 6 in (13.56 m) car "Albert" ====
3A^{A}, Albert, 129A^{A}
- Constructed: 1887
- Fleet numbers: 1
- Operator: Victorian Railways

Specifications
- Car body construction: Timber
- Car length: 44 ft 6 in (13.56 m) over body, 52 ft 5 1/2 in (15.989 m), over coupling points
- Width: 9 ft 7 1/2 in (2.934 m)
- Height: 13 ft (3.96 m)
- Weight: 19 LT 0 cwt 0 qtr (19.30 t)
- Bogies: 33 ft 4 1/2 in (10.173 m) apart 4 ft 10 in (1.47 m) between axle centres
- Coupling system: Screw
- Track gauge: 5 ft 3 in (1,600 mm)

The car was built at the Phoenix Foundry in Ballarat, and entered service in 1887 as 3A^{A}. It was originally the prized car of Solomon Mirls, the chief mechanical engineer of the Victorian Railways from 1878 to 1890. The car was slightly longer than the standard cars, and was laid out with a centre aisle having two-seater benches either side, all facing towards the centre of the carriage. The total capacity was 48 first-class passengers. Each saloon had five benches on either side of the central aisle, with a further two opposite the lavatories behind each saloon section. The lavatory compartments did not have running water, and were placed diagonally opposite each other.

In 1894, the car was rebuilt. The two lavatory compartments were plumbed, and marked "W.C." on the construction diagram. All seats were removed from the men's end of the carriage, including the saloon, and the saloon was refitted with a central table, two long benches, and a small buffet counter. The car was renamed "Albert" in June 1896.

On 27 June 1902, the car returned to regular service as 129A^{A} (the second vehicle to have that identity), and may have been restored to its original configuration. The function of the car was later taken over by State Cars 1, 2 and 3. On 18 May 1903, the car was further modified with one saloon reallocated to second class passengers, and the code changed to 83AB^{AB}.

The car was modified again in 1908, becoming 5ABD^{ABD}. At that stage, it was fitted with a guard's compartment, and may have been used for ticket sales on minor branch lines. Aside from being re-classified to 5ABC in 1910, the car ran in that form until 1941. It was condemned and removed from the rollingstock register on 9 April 1941, then scrapped.

==== 45 ft (14 m) car "Victoria" ====
19A / 19A^{A}, Victoria, 11WW
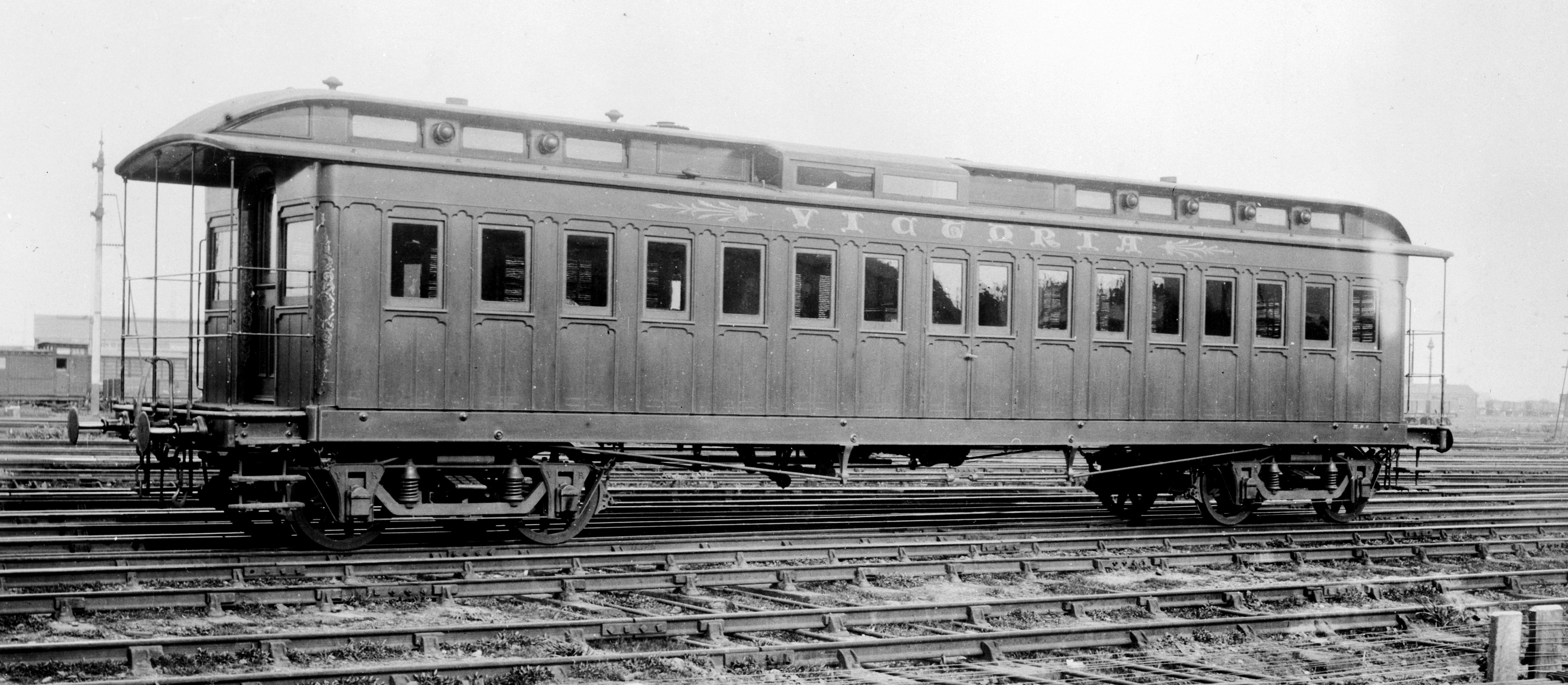
- Victoria carriage sometime after 1894.
- Constructed: 1887
- Fleet numbers: 1
- Operator: Victorian Railways

Specifications
- Car body construction: Timber
- Car length: 45 ft 0 in (13.72 m) over body, 53 ft 4.5 in (16.269 m) over coupling points
- Width: 9 ft 7 in (2.92 m)
- Height: 13 ft 2 in (4.01 m)
- Weight: 20 LT 12 cwt 0 qtr (20.93 t)
- Bogies: 35 ft 6 in (10.82 m) apart, 4 ft 10 in (1.47 m) between axle centres
- Braking system: Westinghouse Air Brake
- Coupling system: Screw
- Track gauge: 5 ft 3 in (1,600 mm)

The carriage entered service on 1 March 1887, and was the first one built for the Victorian Railways with a 45 ft (14 m)-long body. It was classified 19A but, within a year, that had changed to A^{A}, to reflect that it was a bogie vehicle as distinct from the non-bogie fleet. The car was always intended for special use, rather than being an addition to the regular passenger rolling stock, and the original documentation refers to the car as the "New Departmental Victoria". It seems likely that the car was always intended to be known as "Victoria", even though that name was not applied to the carriage sides until 1894. At the same time, Knowles ventilators were fitted.

The car was fitted with the Westinghouse brake from new, and was designed to be a self-sufficient vehicle. It had a 2 ft 6 in (0.76 m) platform either side of the body for access, and inward-swinging doors to access the saloons. The longer saloon was 16 ft 10 1/2 in (5.144 m) across, and matched the first six windows along the body side. It had two small chairs in the platform-end corners, an extension table in the centre, and two fixed couches of 8 ft 2 in (2.49 m) and 12 ft 2 in (3.71 m) respectively. The next four windows either side were for the guard's compartment, which included an elevated seat for the guard to view signals through cupola windows, as well as an ice chest and small buffet counter facing the long saloon. On one side, an extra-length window was provided for the guard's paperwork desk, and the next window was for a 3 ft 1 in (0.94 m) toilet compartment. Opposite them, two window-lengths were used for a larger, 5 ft 3 in (1.6 m), lavatory compartment. They were either side of a central corridor, which linked to a 14 ft 7 in (4.45 m) four-windowed saloon, fitted with eight seats, which led to the open platform.

By 1925, the car had been modified for use in the Better Farming Train, a special marketing service devised by Harold Clapp, the Victorian Railways' Chief Commissioner at the time. Being part of a full train consist, the guard facilities were no longer required, so they were removed and the entire compartment was converted to a larger kitchen area. The corridor connecting the two saloons was partitioned, additional cooking benches were provided, and the ice chests were moved. The guard's seat was also removed and a stove was fitted in its place. The saloons were left mostly untouched, but some of the loose chairs had been moved.

In 1943, the car was withdrawn from special service and converted to a Way and Works vehicle, for use by railway workmen around the state. In that form, it was given the identity of 11WW, officially applied from 19 November 1943. The car continued in that service until 1954, when it was removed from the railway register and marked for scrap. However, in 1955, the body was noted in use as part of a scout hall in Trugannini Road, Caulfield, south of Carnegie railway station. It was still there through the early 1970s, but vanished after that until spotted again in the 1990s behind Mimosa Road, Caulfield, painted white and with a protective roof. In 2009, the car body was under shelter in Newport Workshops, having been moved there circa 2005.

== Liveries ==
All carriages began with the then-standard dark maroon livery over a black underframe, with yellow pin-striping and details. During and after World War I, the detailing was abolished and they were painted plain red, with white text on black rectangles for running information, such as class and identity.

The seven cars of the Better Farming Train were painted bright yellow.

== Disposal and preservation ==
The vast majority of American type carriages were destroyed and burnt as a quick, easy form of disposal. Some were sold as sheds or a cheap form of housing, and a handful were retained for preservation.

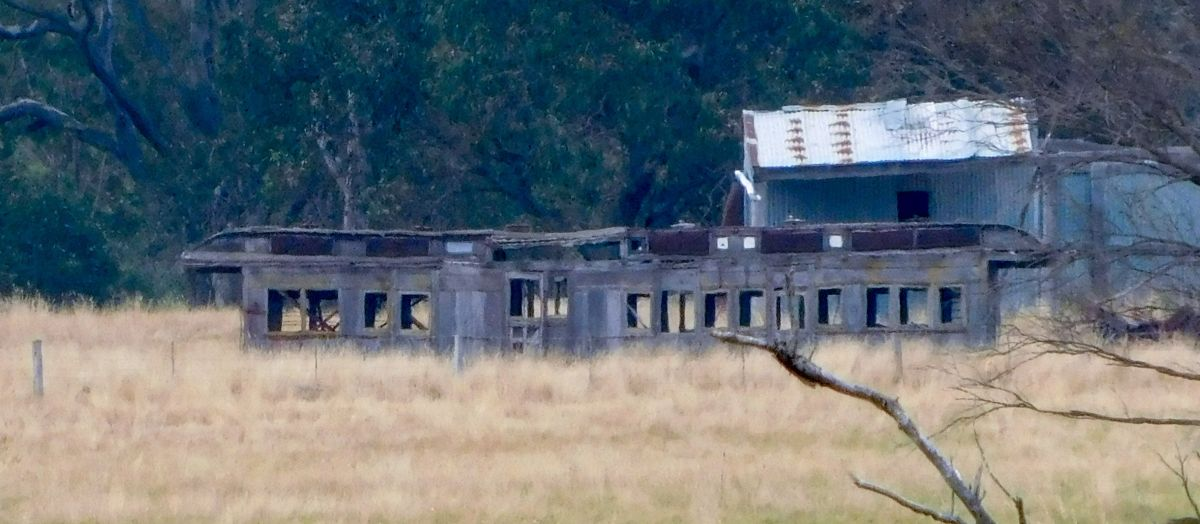
Grounded body of 1ABC at Munro, Gippsland January 2023
