= Colinton (house) =

Heritage-listed house in Melbourne, Victoria, Australia

- Location of the house in Greater Metropolitan Melbourne
- Etymology: Colinton, Edinburgh, Scotland

General information
- Status: Completed
- Type: House
- Architectural style: Inter-war Old English
- Location: 92 Mont Albert Road, Canterbury, City of Boroondara, Melbourne, Victoria, Australia
- Coordinates: 37°49′02″S 145°04′07″E
- Completed: 1926; 100 years ago
- Client: Walter Gillespie

Technical details
- Material: Bricks; timber; shingles
- Grounds: 3,418 m^{2} (36,790 sq ft)

Design and construction
- Architecture firm: Barlow and Hawkins

Victorian Heritage Register
- Official name: Residence (formerly Colinton)
- Type: Registered place
- Designated: 8 January 1998
- Reference no.: VHR H1399
- Heritage overlay no.: HO178
- Category: Residential buildings (private)

Colinton is a house located at 92 Mont Albert Road in Canterbury, in the City of Boroondara, in the inner eastern suburbs of Melbourne, in Victoria, Australia.

Built in 1926 on the traditional lands of the Wurundjeri people, the house was added to the Victorian Heritage Register on 8 January 1998 in recognition of its architectural, historical, and social significance; and was also added to a non-statutory list by the Victorian branch of the National Trust on 2 February 1998.

== History ==
=== Gillespie family ===
Alexander Gillespie, Jnr., was born in 1832 in Colinton, near Edinburgh, Scotland, a son of Alexander Gillespie, Snr., a miller. (Note: Most likely a descendant of James Gillespie, a notable Scottish miller and philanthropist.) Alexander, Jnr., and his brother, George, migrated to Australia and George established a grain products business in Melbourne during the c. 1850s – c. 1860s. Two of George's sons, John (James) and Robert Winton (later, Sir Robert), established the highly successful flour-milling business, called Gillespie Brothers, in Sydney, at Pyrmont, with mills throughout regional New South Wales, Victoria, and Queensland, and were seen as being in the front line of milling development.

In 1887, a group including Alexander Gillespie, Jnr., operating as Yarra Falls Roller Flour Mills, purchased the site of the original Dights Falls Mill. There they constructed a new mill on the site, with 370-kilowatt (500 hp) water-driven turbines, the largest capacity water-power system in Victoria at the time of construction, and technically Victoria's first hydro-electric plant. Continuing problems with the supply of water led to the mill being converted to steam in the 1890's. The mill was sold in 1909, and burned down soon afterwards. The remnants of the former milling site have been partially restored as the oldest surviving industrial site in Melbourne, and was also added to the Victorian Heritage Register.

Alexander Gillespie, Jnr., and Marion, née McClure, had two sons, Alexander (III) and Walter David Gillespie (1881–1948), who both entered entered their father's milling business, Alexander Gillespie and Sons, and became partners in the Burnley Flour Mills. The family sold the Burnley mill in c. 1921 and Walter and his wife, Lilian, née Harrison, purchased a grazing property at Glenthompson, near the Grampian mountain range; however, their time in the country was short-lived, due to the poor health of Alexander, Jnr., and they returned to Melbourne.

=== The house ===
Colinton was built in 1926 (Note: The 1921 death notice of Walter Gillespie's mother, Marion, recorded her as living at Colinton at the time of her death; and the 1926 death notice of his father, Alexander, Snr., recorded him as living at Colinton at the time of his death. However, in both cases, it lists Colinton as addressed on Glenferrie Road, not Mont Albert Road.) to the design of the architectural firm Barlow and Hawkins as the family home of Walter and Lilian and their four children. Three years later, the family travelled to England and Scotland, and returned to Australia in 1931 to find the family's financial position drastically altered during the height of the Great Depression; and they were forced to sell Colinton in 1935. The family relocated to Sydney and gained employed with Gillespie Brothers, his cousins' business, at a mill in Redfern.

Subsequent owners of Colinton were Henry Beecham (c. 1847–1925), principal of the listed timber merchants; Walter Higgins, company director; Arthur Goode (c. 1926–2000), stockbroker; and manufacturer Max Chester and his wife, Jane, in 1992. During 1962, under the Goode ownership, the south west service wing was added to the design of architect David Nall who also converted the guest bedroom to allow access to the garden. Apart from the excision of one house block on the east side, the property has retained its extensive garden setting.

Set on 3,418 square metres (36,790 sq ft), the six-bedroom house, extensively renovated in c. 2015 with a copper-covered tennis court and modern fixtures and fittings, was listed for sale in October 2026.

== Description ==
The Inter-war Old English style house is set well back on its large corner block to allow a picturesque view of the house across the garden. The picturesque is accentuated by the sweeping driveway and by the oblique siting of the house which gives emphasis to the three dimensional form of the design. The steep pitched, shingled roof with its 'swept valleys' is well composed and can be appreciated from the street. The tall clumped chimney flues, small paned windows, and the half-timbered surface treatment all add to the romantic illusion of a substantial English country house in a park setting. This illusion is carried through into the interior, mainly in the stair hall, dining and sitting rooms. The four elevations are studied and are substantially intact, particularly on the north, south and east sides. The working drawings for the house, signed by F. G. Hawkins, are in existence and the house displays a high degree of integrity and intactness particularly in respect of the roof, chimneys, major windows, brickwork and masonry finishes, stair and stair hall, sleep-out, lighting fixtures, doors and door furniture, switches, bell systems and joinery. As well, the garden setting with its several early plantings, its sweeping gravel drive, its imposing front gates (replicas of the originals) and its open lawn giving a clear vista of the house, remains faithful to the original design concept.

Marcus Barlow was a skilled publicist and Colinton was featured in an extensive article in the leading magazine Australian Home Beautiful in May 1927; as well as in Barlow and Hawkins' showcase publication Australian Homes, also published in 1927.

== See also ==
- Architecture of Melbourne
- List of places on the Victorian Heritage Register in the City of Boroondara
