= East Camberwell railway station =

Railway station in Melbourne, Australia

East Camberwell
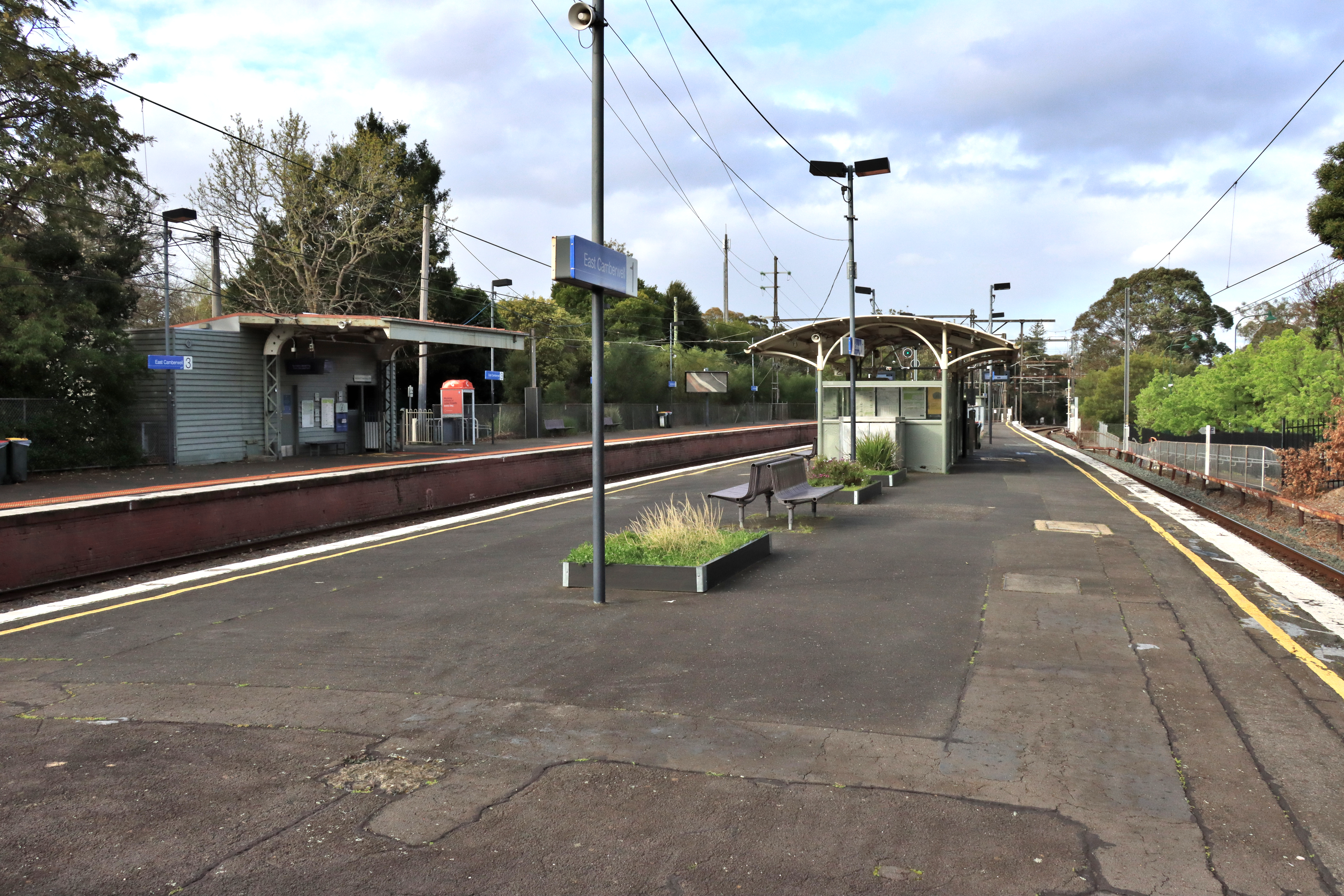
- Eastbound view from Platform 1, August 2024

General information
- Location: Sefton Place, Camberwell, Victoria 3124; City of Boroondara; Australia
- Coordinates: 37°49′33″S 145°04′06″E
- System: PTV commuter rail station
- Owner: VicTrack
- Operator: Metro Trains
- Lines: Belgrave; Lilydale
- Distance: 11.08 kilometres from Southern Cross
- Platforms: 3 (1 island, 1 side)
- Tracks: 3

Construction
- Structure type: Ground
- Parking: 60
- Cycle facilities: Yes
- Accessible: No—steep ramp

Other information
- Status: Operational, unstaffed
- Station code: ECM
- Fare zone: Myki zone 1
- Website: Public Transport Victoria

History
- Opened: 14 May 1900; 126 years ago
- Rebuilt: 8 November 1964
- Electrified: December 1922 (1500 V DC overhead)

Passengers
- 2005–2006: 245,844
- 2006–2007: 304,414 ▲23.82%
- 2007–2008: 290,862 ▼4.45%
- 2008–2009: 252,854 ▼13.06%
- 2009–2010: 253,700 ▲0.33%
- 2010–2011: 277,891 ▲9.53%
- 2011–2012: 259,069 ▼6.77%
- 2012–2013: Not measured
- 2013–2014: 252,051 ▼2.7%
- 2014–2015: 249,925 ▼0.84%
- 2015–2016: 277,396 ▲10.99%
- 2016–2017: 265,864 ▼4.15%
- 2017–2018: 252,009 ▼5.21%
- 2018–2019: 260,369 ▲3.31%
- 2019–2020: 201,450 ▼22.62%
- 2020–2021: 100,800 ▼49.96%
- 2021–2022: 104,900 ▲4.06%
- 2022–2023: 108,800 ▲3.71%
- 2023–2024: 176,350 ▲62.09%
- 2024–2025: 185,950 ▲5.44%

Services
Preceding station	Metro Trains	Following station
Camberwell towards Flinders Street	Lilydale line	Canterbury towards Lilydale
Camberwell towards Flinders Street	Belgrave line	Canterbury towards Belgrave
Former services
Shenley towards East Kew	Alamein line	Riversdale towards Ashburton
	List of closed railway stations in Melbourne	
Track layout
Location

East Camberwell station is a railway station operated by Metro Trains Melbourne on the Belgrave and Lilydale lines, which are part of the Melbourne rail network. It serves the eastern Melbourne suburb of Camberwell in Victoria, Australia. East Camberwell is a ground level unstaffed station featuring three platforms, an island platform with two faces and one side platform. It opened on 14 May 1900, with the current station provided in 1986 following a fire.

A substation is located north-east of the station, along with a former works depot.

== History ==
East Camberwell station opened on 14 May 1900, and was originally the interchange station for the Deepdene Dasher service, which operated north along the Outer Circle line, that had originally opened in 1891. Three platforms were provided; two high-level platforms for services on the Lilydale line, and a single low-level platform for services on the Outer Circle line. Steps were provided between all platforms, to enable passengers to change between services. Between 1915 and 1922, a signal box at the Melbourne (up) end was provided, to control the junction towards Riversdale (on today's Alamein line), as the three tracks through to Camberwell had been reduced to two, to allow the regrading works at Camberwell to proceed. On 9 October 1927, the Deepdene Dasher service was withdrawn, and the northern section of the Outer Circle line closed on 6 September 1943, when goods services to East Kew ended. The low level platform was removed at some point after World War II.

In 1964, the platforms on the Lilydale and Belgrave lines were rebuilt, when work to provide a third track between Camberwell and East Camberwell was carried out, with the southern platform converted into an island platform. The track amplification work also removed the bridge that had carried the Lilydale and Belgrave lines over the Outer Circle line. In 1971, the third track was extended to Box Hill.

In 1981, the Edwardian timber station building on Platforms 1 and 2 was replaced with a brick structure, partly due to the perceived fire risk. However, on 12 August 1986, it was destroyed by fire, and was replaced with the current open canopy.

In 1990, actor and comedian Barry Humphries described the station as a "scrawled-on urine-reeking wasteland."

== Platforms and services ==
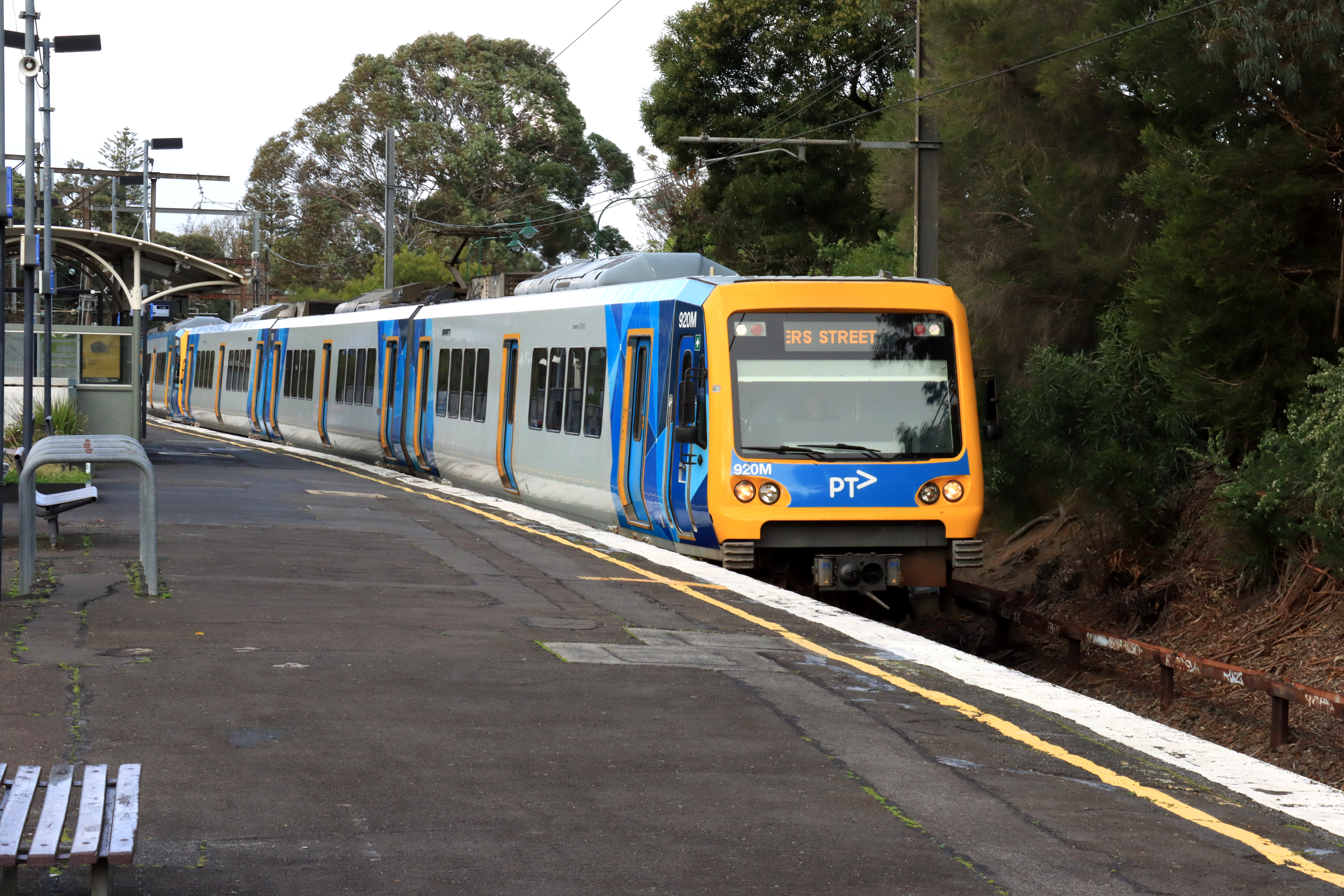
An X'Trapolis train on a Flinders Street-bound service arrives at Platform 1, August 2024

East Camberwell has an island platform with two faces and a side platform. All three platforms are linked by an underpass.

It is serviced by Metro Trains' Belgrave and Lilydale line services.

East Camberwell platform arrangement
Platform	Line	Destination	Via	Service Type	Notes	Source
1	Belgrave line Lilydale line	Flinders Street	City Loop	All stations and limited express services	See City Loop for operating patterns	
2	Belgrave line Lilydale line	Lilydale, Belgrave		All stations	Weekends only.	
3	Belgrave line Lilydale line	Blackburn, Ringwood, Lilydale, Belgrave		All stations	Weekdays only.	

== Gallery ==
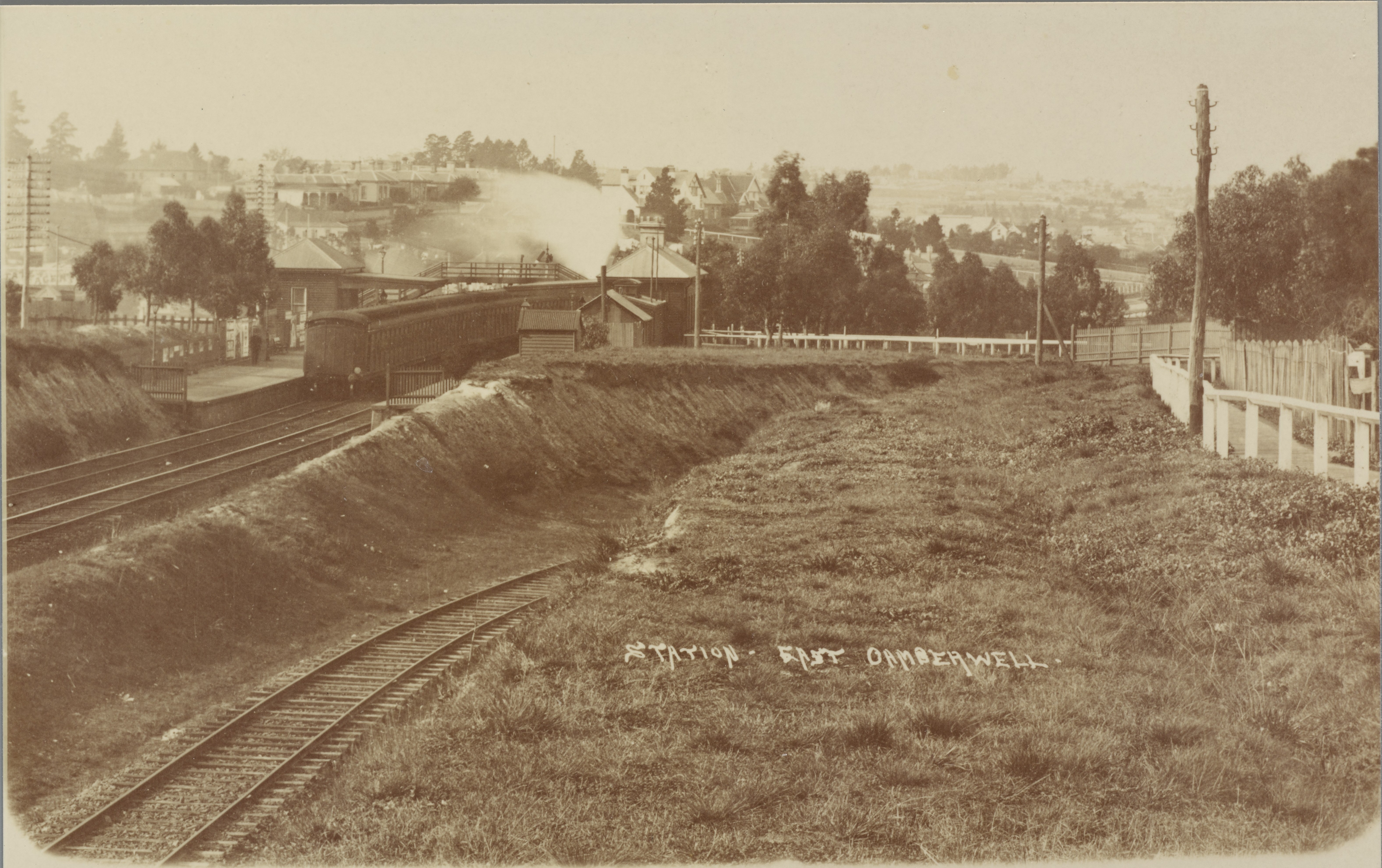
The station circa 1907

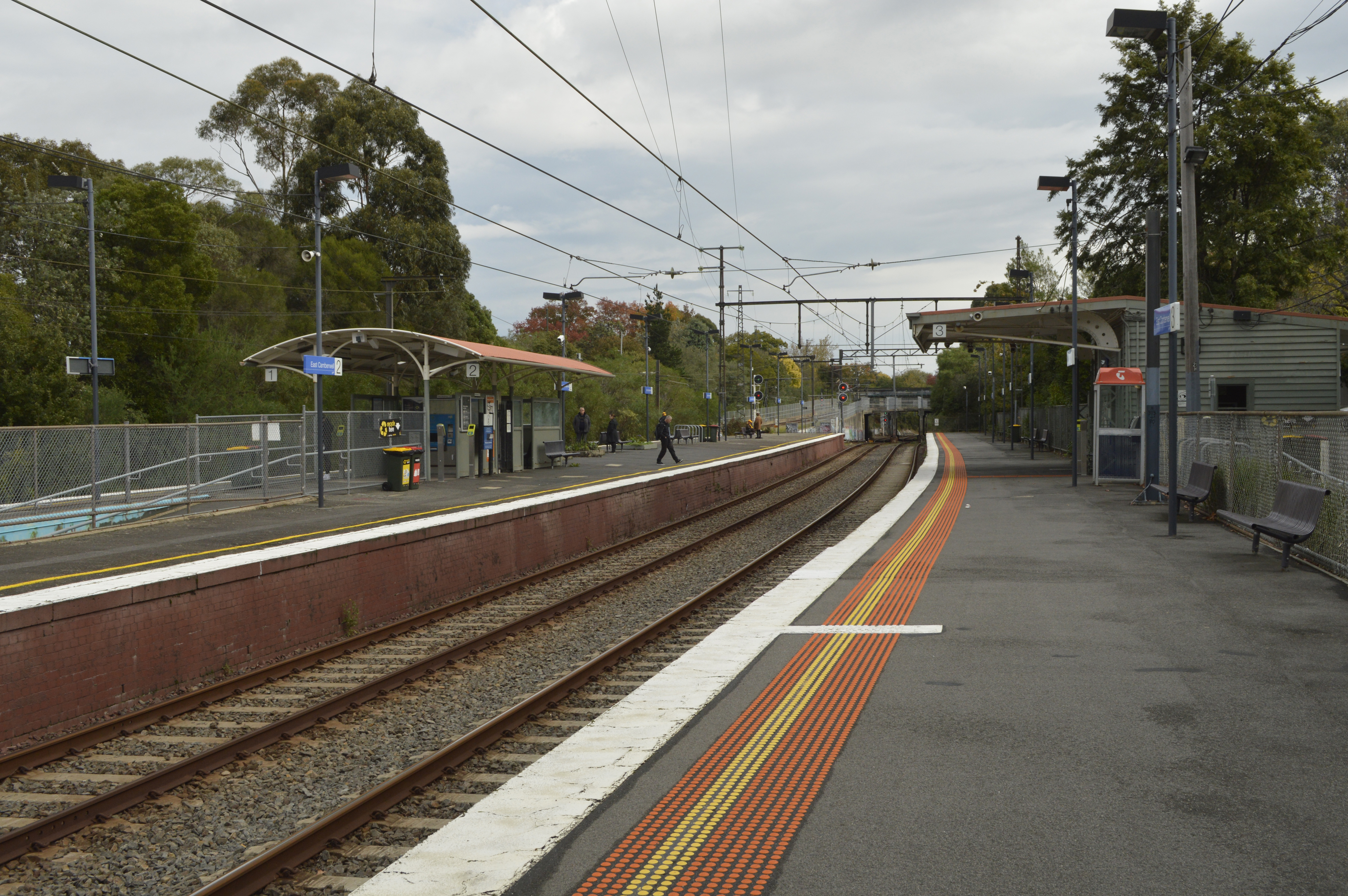
Westbound view from Platform 3, with the Alamein line flyover in the background, May 2014

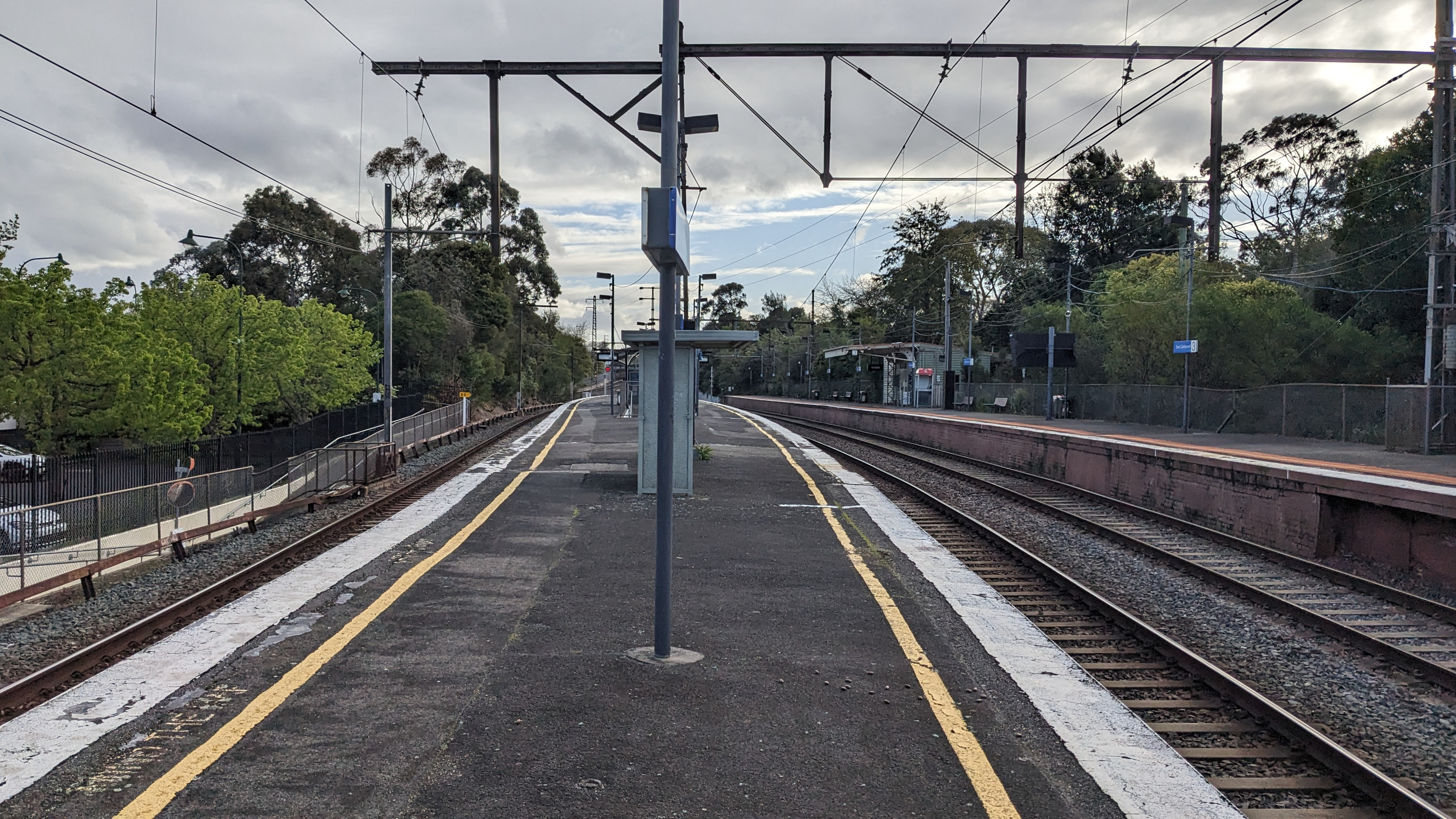
Westbound view from Platform 1 and 2, August 2024

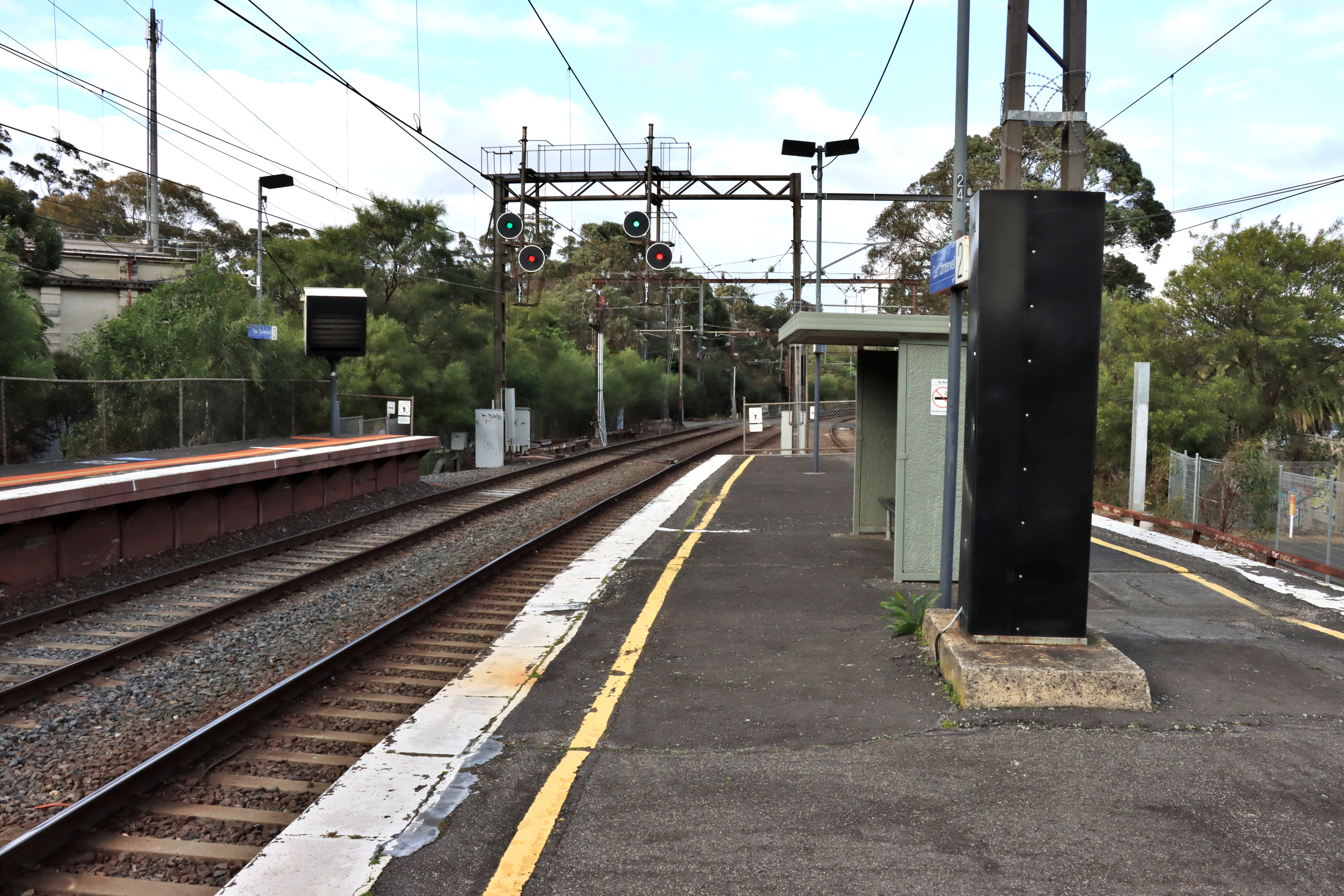
Eastbound view from the east end of Platform 2, August 2024

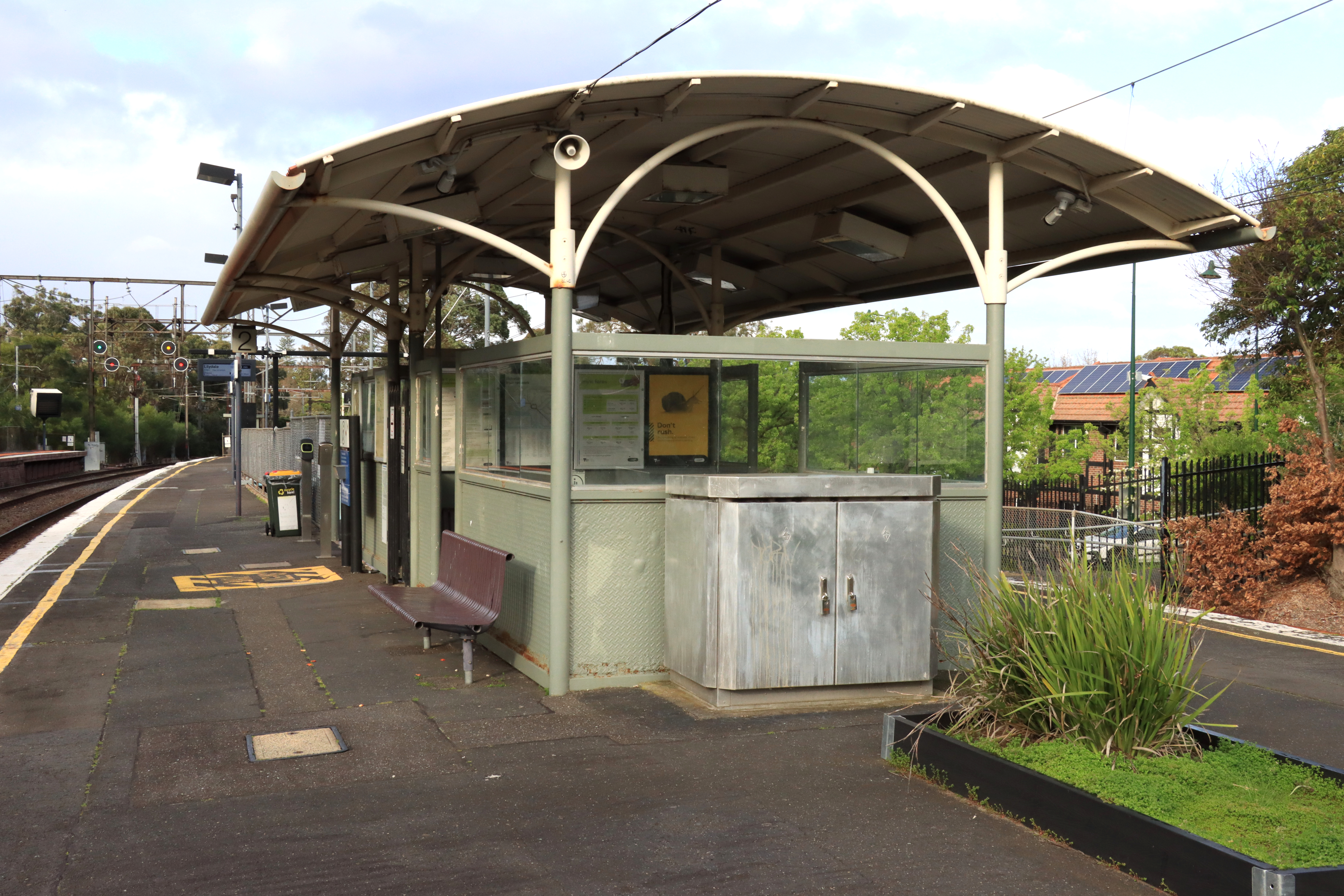
Waiting shelter on Platforms 1 and 2, August 2024

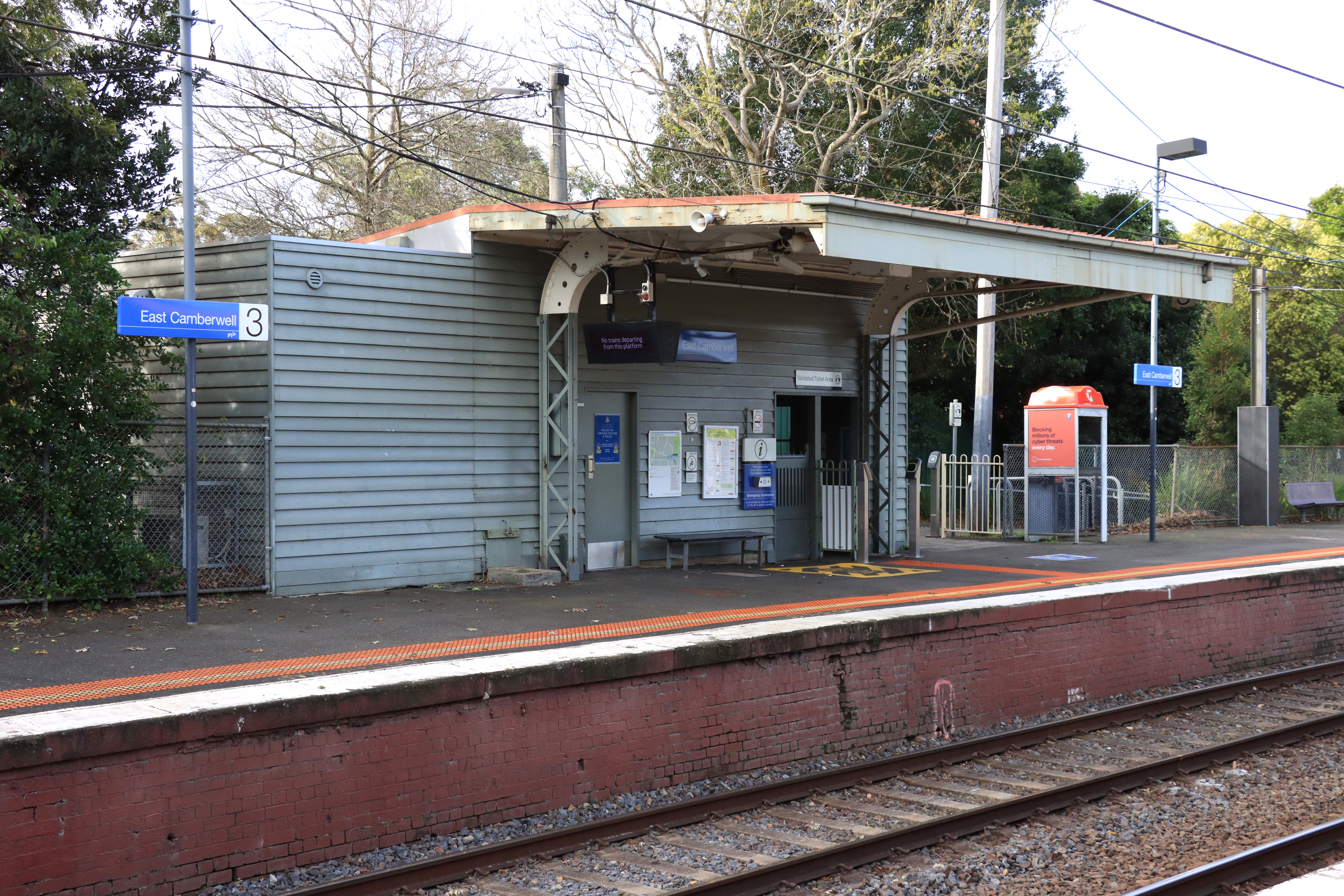
Station building and shelter on Platform 3, August 2024

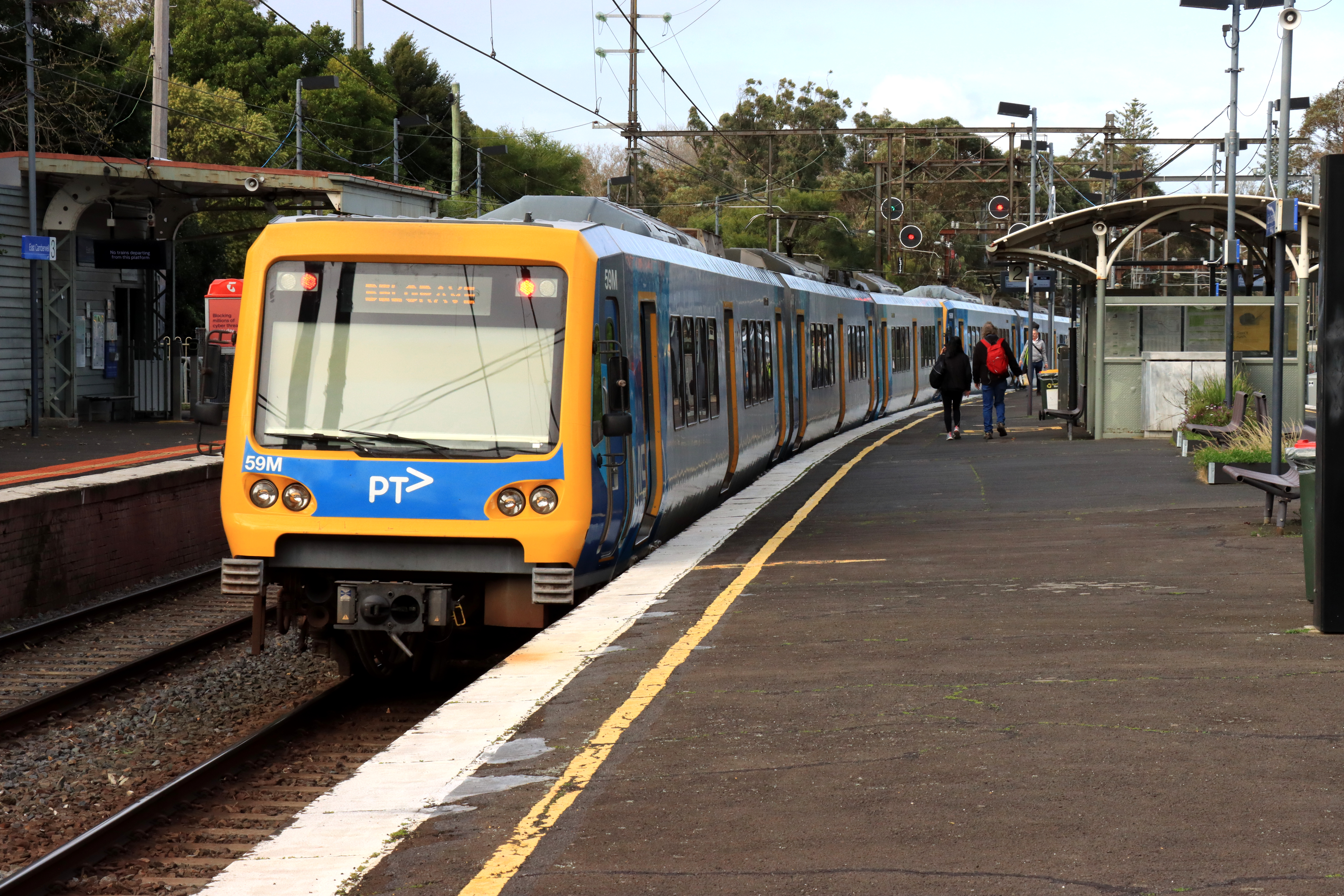
X'Trapolis train on a Belgrave-bound service departs Platform 2, August 2024

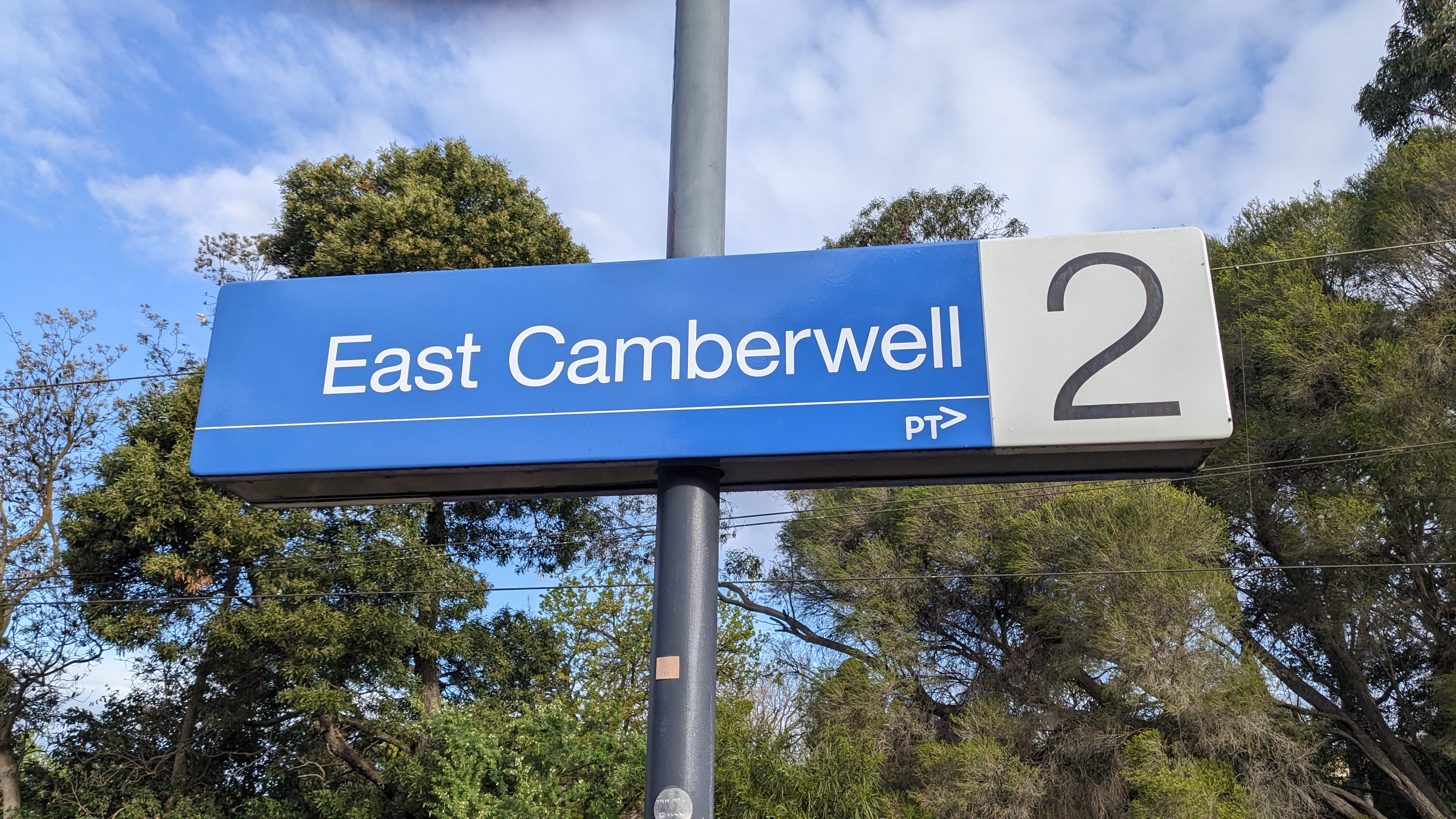
Station signage on Platform 2, August 2024
