= Canterbury, Victoria =

Canterbury
- Suburb
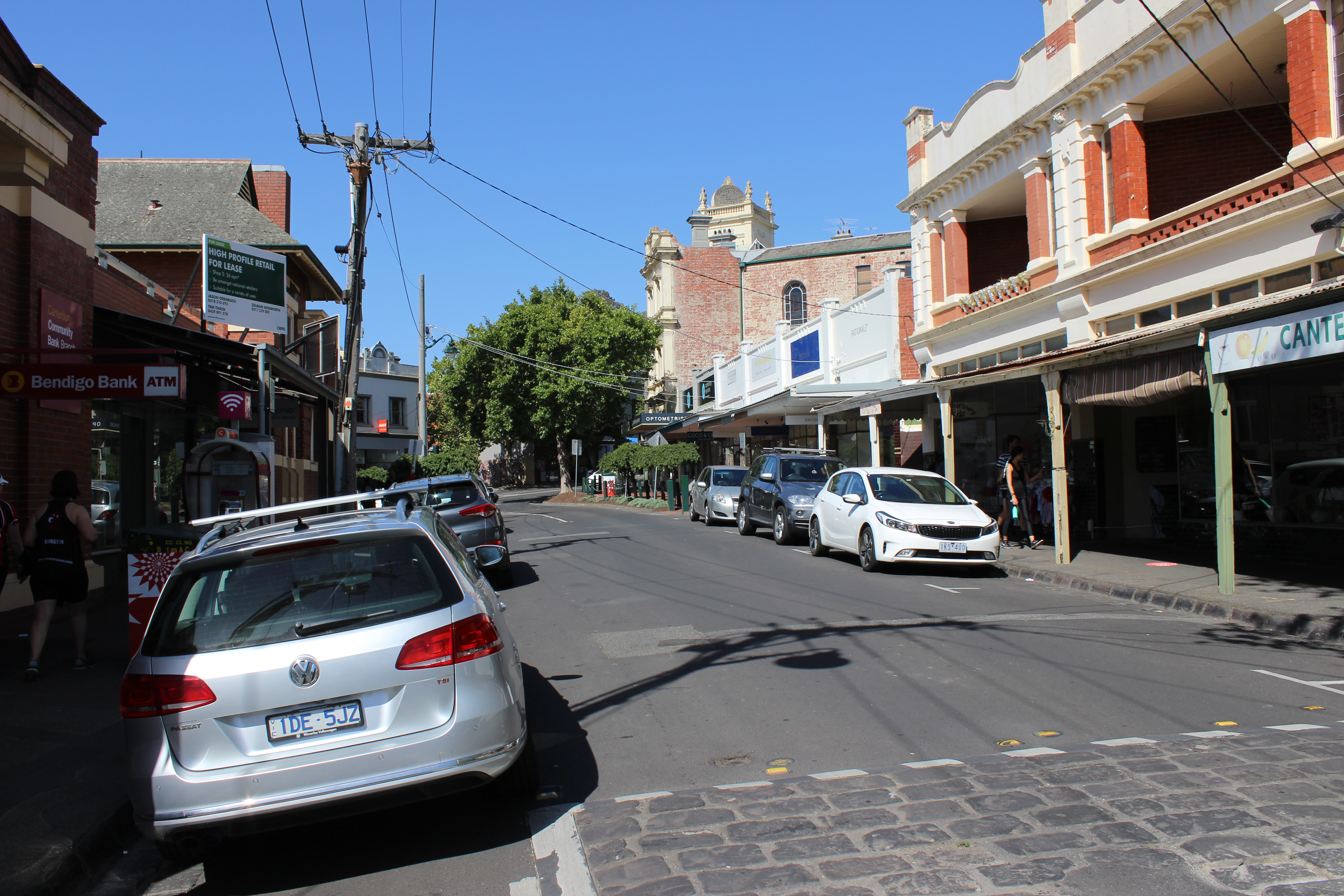
- Maling Road, Canterbury

- Interactive map of Canterbury
- Coordinates: 37.825°S 145.078°E
- Country: Australia
- State: Victoria
- City: Melbourne
- LGA: City of Boroondara
- Location: 10 km (6.2 mi) from Melbourne

Government
  - State electorates: Hawthorn; Kew
  - Federal division: Kooyong

Area
  - Total: 3 km^{2} (1.2 sq mi)
- Elevation: 70 m (230 ft)

Population
  - Total: 7,800 (2021 census)
  - Density: 2,600/km^{2} (6,700/sq mi)
- Postcode: 3126
Suburbs around Canterbury
Kew East	Balwyn	Balwyn
Hawthorn East	Canterbury	Surrey Hills
Camberwell	Camberwell	Surrey Hills

Canterbury is an eastern suburb of Melbourne, Victoria, Australia, 10 km (6.2 mi) from the Melbourne Central Business District, located within the City of Boroondara local government area. Canterbury recorded a population of 7,800 at the 2021 census.

Canterbury is characterized by its tree-lined boulevards and historic residential buildings.

== Geography ==
Canterbury extends as far as Mont Albert Road in the north, Burke Road in the west, Chatham and Highfield Roads in the east and Riversdale Road to the south. The main thoroughfare through Canterbury is Canterbury Road, which runs east–west and roughly bisects the suburb.

Canterbury is home to some of Victoria's oldest private schools, including Camberwell Grammar School, Camberwell Girls Grammar School and Strathcona Baptist Girls Grammar School. Other schools include Camberwell High School, Canterbury Girls' Secondary College and Canterbury Primary School. Canterbury contains various parks and gardens and is home to the Camberwell Hockey Club on Matlock Street. The Canterbury Sports Ground, home of cricket and Australian football, is in Chatham Road.

The main shopping area in Canterbury is around the railway station and includes shops in Canterbury Road, as well as Maling Road. Larger shopping centres nearby include Burke Road in Camberwell and Whitehorse Road in Balwyn.

Canterbury is serviced by the Canterbury and East Camberwell stations, on the Lilydale and Belgrave train lines. It is also serviced by tram routes 72 and 109.

== History ==
The railway station is in many ways responsible for the suburb's existence: before the opening of the railway to the City in 1882, the area was a semi-rural area. Even then, it was occupied by the well to do. Many of these early residents and in some cases, their properties, are remembered in the street names of the suburb, notably Logan Street and Monomeath Avenue.

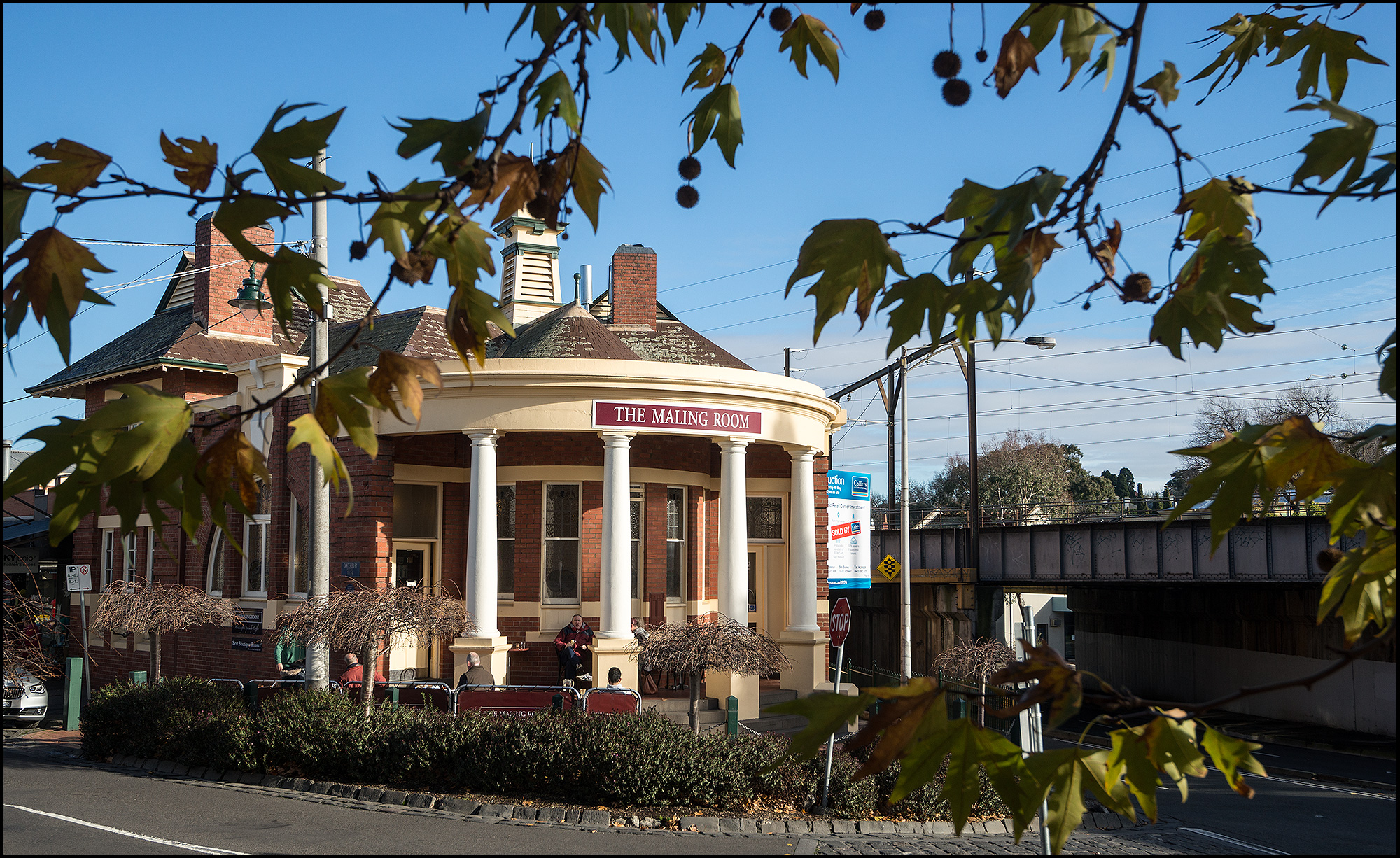
The former Canterbury Post Office

Canterbury Post Office opened on 22 November 1870; and was closed between 1887 and 1892, before being reopened. After its closure, the building was repurposed as a café.

The first subdivision in the area was in 1885 when Michael Logan created the 'Claremont Park Estate' within the area of Canterbury Road, Bryson Street, Prospect Hill Road, and Logan Street. At around this time, Edward Snowden settled on seven hectares (seventeen acres), centred on a manor he named Monomeath. In 1900, Snowden's estate was subdivided and sold off to form what is now Monomeath Avenue and residents such as notable architect Percey Kernot and prominent citizen George Coghill moved in. The road was paved in 1911 and lined with oak trees.

=== Heritage listings ===
The following places in Canterbury are listed on the Victorian Heritage Register:

- Canterbury Mansions, corner of Canterbury and Malang roads
- Colinton, 92 Mont Albert Road
- Cullymont, 4 Selwyn Street
- Emulation Hall, 3 Rochester Road
- Eyre Court, 2 Molesworth Street
- Frognall, 54 Mont Albert Road
- Parlington, 46 Parlington Street
- Shrublands, 16 Balwyn Road

== Population ==
In the 2021 Census, there were 7,800 people in Canterbury.

=== Country of birth ===
65.6% of people were born in Australia. The next most common countries of birth were China (10.4%), England (3.3%), Malaysia (1.7%), India (1.7%) and New Zealand (1.4%).

=== Language used at home ===
70.7% of people spoke only English at home. Other languages spoken at home included Mandarin (13.2%), Cantonese (2.3%), Greek (1.3%) and Vietnamese (1.2%).

=== Religious affiliation ===
The most common responses for religion were No Religion (44.6%), Catholic (18.5%) and Anglican (10.4%).

== Culture ==
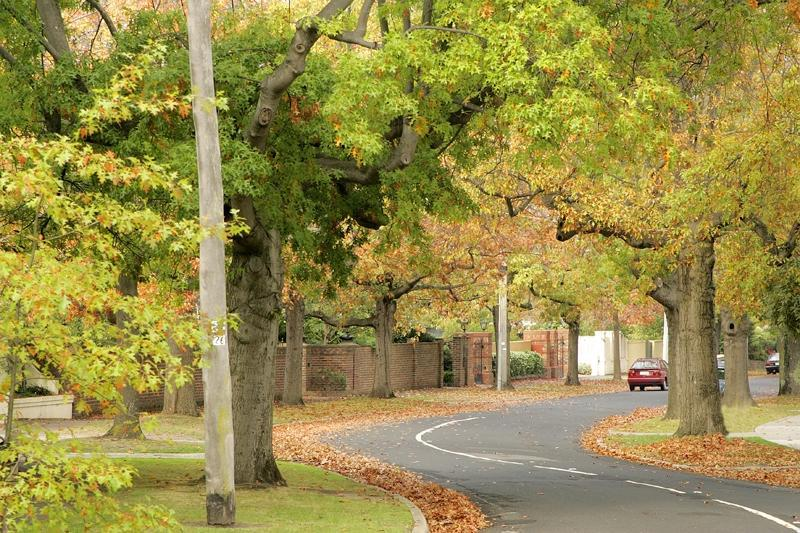
Monomeath Avenue

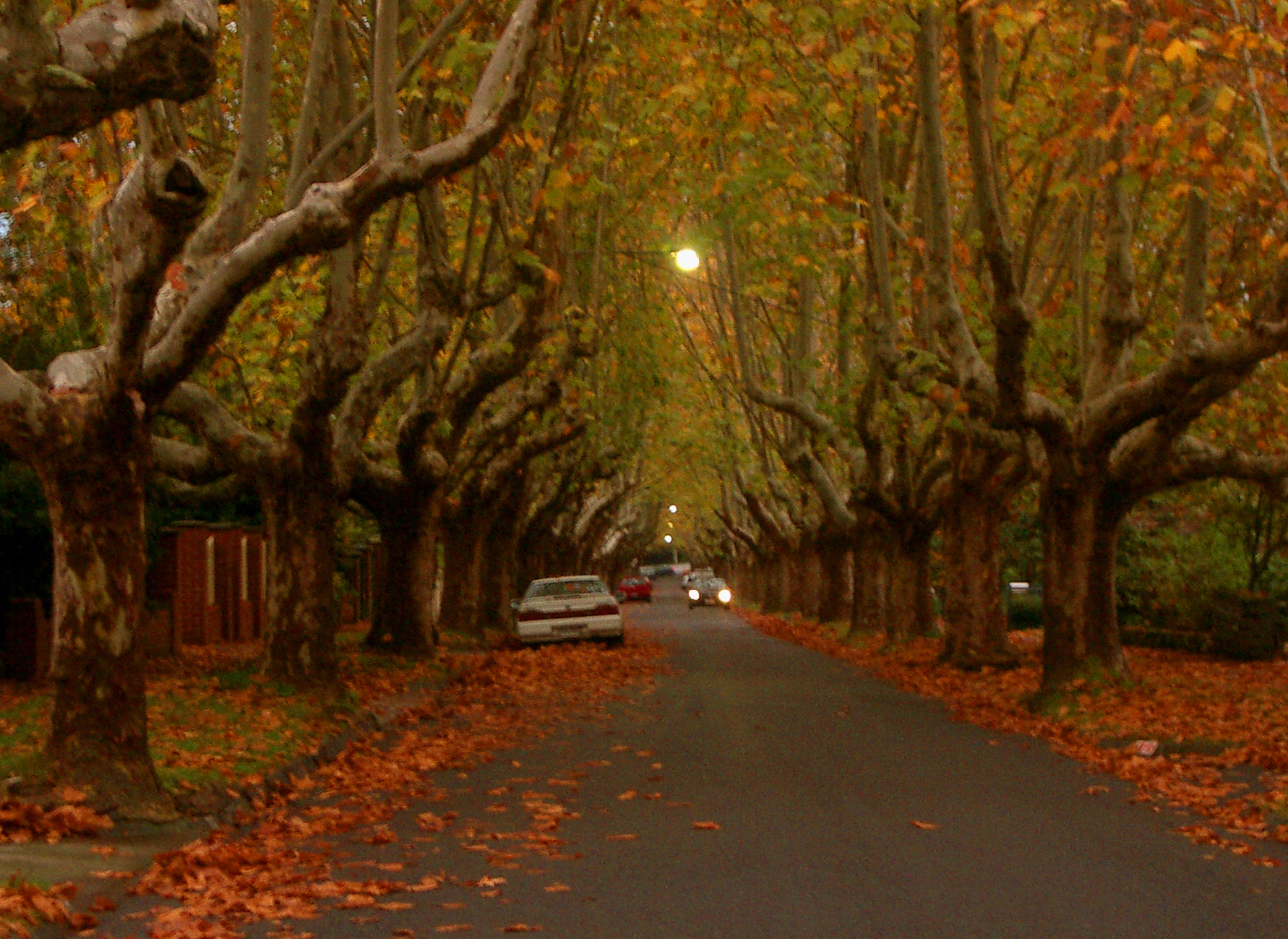
Victoria Avenue

Canterbury is regarded as one of Melbourne's most exclusive suburbs, particularly the "Golden Mile", which is the part of Mont Albert Road, running west from Balwyn Road and the avenues that connect it to Canterbury Road, specifically Monomeath Avenue, which is lined by large, century old oak trees and grand ornate mansions and is home to many notable politicians and leaders of business and industry.

Other blue-chip locales along this stretch include Alexandra Avenue, Hopetoun Avenue, Victoria Avenue and The Ridge. It consistently ranks in the top three suburbs for average house prices in Melbourne.

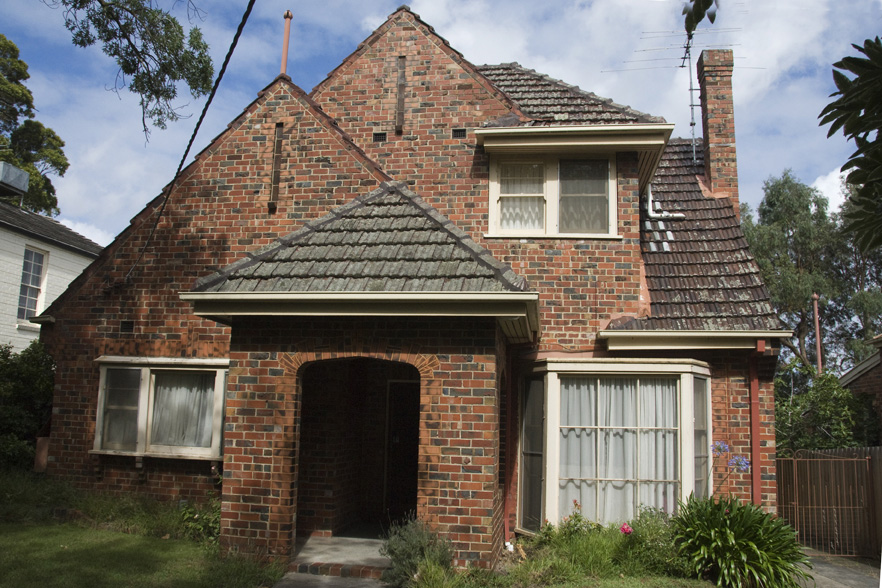
Residential home in Canterbury

=== Notable residents ===
Present and past residents of Canterbury include or have included:

- Sir Macfarlane Burnet OM, AK, KBE, FRS, FAA, FRSNZ – virologist best known for his contributions to immunology. He won a Nobel Prize in 1960 for predicting acquired immune tolerance and was best known for developing the theory of clonal selection. He was the first ever Australian of the Year and the Burnet Institute is named in his honour
- Frank Cheshire – bookseller and publisher who founded the F. W. Cheshire Pty. Ltd. publishing house
- Frank Cicutto – former CEO of National Australia Bank
- Sir Rupert Hamer – former Premier of Victoria
- Billy Harvey MC – Australian Rules footballer who during World War I won the Military Cross and was killed during the Battle of Passchendaele
- Alfred Mellor – stockbroker and financier
- Kylie and Dannii Minogue's family
- Andrew Peacock – former federal leader of the Liberal Party of Australia
- Tom Schieffer – former US Ambassador to Australia, and to Japan

== Sport ==
The suburb has an Australian rules football team called the Canterbury Cobras with senior and junior teams for women and men and boys and girls. The club founded in 1881 is one of the oldest local clubs still in existence. The club originally played on a ground where Strathcona is now situated, before moving in the late 1890s to an oval built by William Malone behind his Canterbury Club Hotel in between Maling and Wattle Valley Roads. This ground was the home of the cricket and football clubs. The club moved to its current location at the Canterbury Sportsground in the early 1900s.

It has worn its distinctive red, gold (originally yellow) and black colours since 1915. This was chosen by locals to respect the memory of the Anzacs sacrifice in Flanders Fields, Belgium. The club won its first senior premiership in 1920 when it defeated Mitcham by a point. The club has also won senior men's premierships in 1923, 1956, 1969, 1972, 1991, 2003, 2015, 2024. The club briefly changed its colours to Green with a gold vee at the end of World War 2 when it feared its jumper looked too much like the postwar new German flag. The club reverted back to its old colors in 1949 and worn them since.

== Schools ==
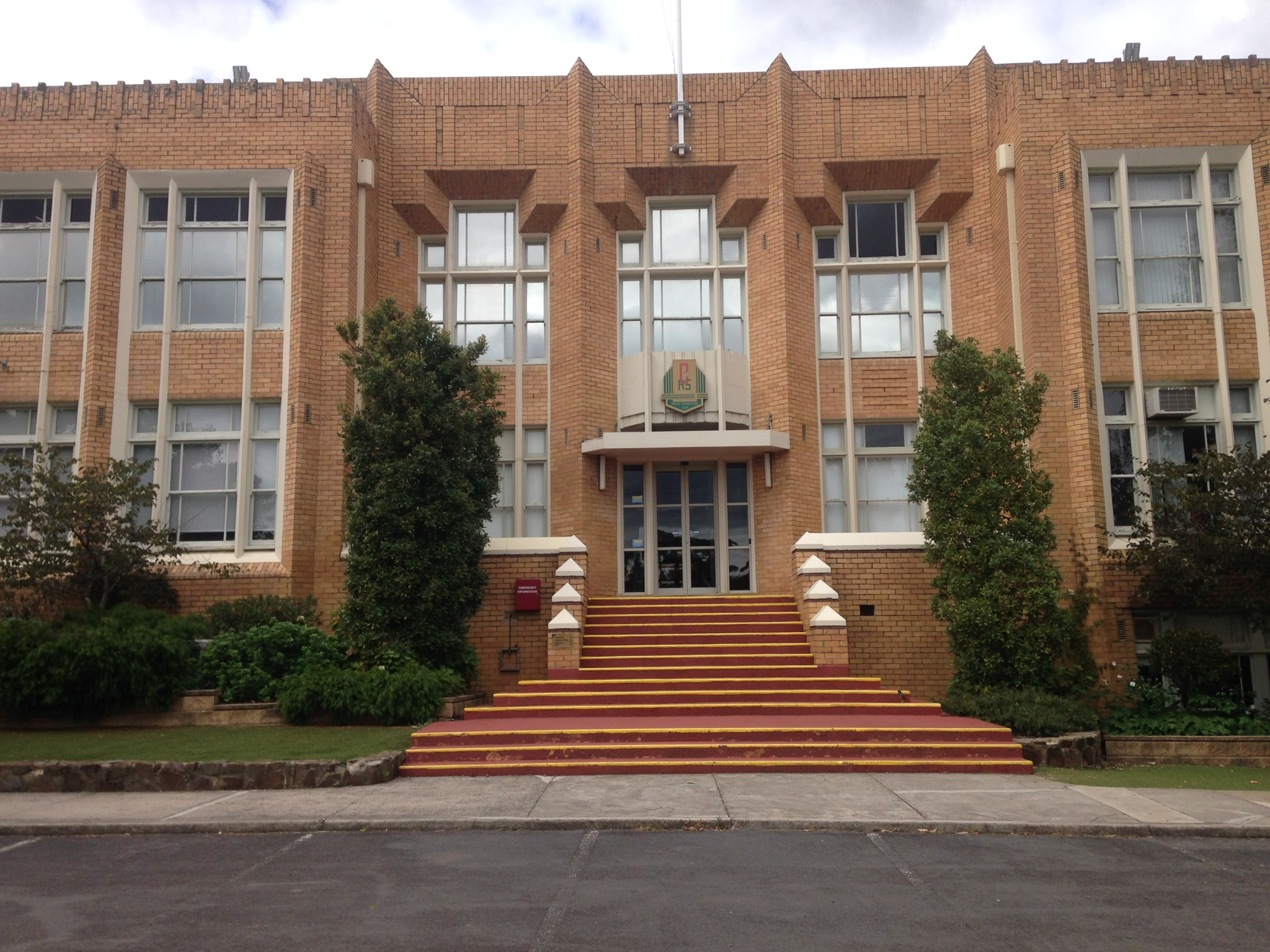
Camberwell High School, a secondary school in Canterbury

Canterbury has a number of primary and secondary schools in its vicinity. These include Canterbury Primary School, Camberwell Grammar School, Camberwell High School, Strathcona Baptist Girls' Grammar School, and Canterbury Girls' Secondary College.

== Places of worship ==
- Cornerstone Canterbury Christadelphian Church
- Canterbury Presbyterian Church
- Canterbury Baptist Church

== See also ==
- City of Camberwell – Canterbury was previously within this former local government area.
