= East Kew railway station =

Railway station located at Kew, Melbourne, Australia

Coordinates: 37°48′4″S 145°3′17″E

East Kew

General information
- Lines: Alamein, Outer Circle railway
- Platforms: 2

History
- Opened: 24 March 1891
- Closed: 6 September 1943

Services
| Preceding station | Disused railways | Following station |
|---|---|---|
| Willsmere towards Fairfield | Outer Circle line | Deepdene towards Oakleigh |
| Terminus | Alamein line | Deepdene towards Ashburton |
| | List of closed railway stations in Melbourne | |
Location

East Kew was a railway station on the Outer Circle railway line, located in the suburb of Kew, Melbourne, Victoria, Australia. The station opened with the line on 24 March 1891, and closed with the line on 12 April 1893. It was on the west side of Normanby Road, and was the site of a crossing loop, with a platform on each track. A goods siding was also provided at the Riversdale end.

On 11 February 1925, the station was reopened for goods traffic only, as the terminus of the reopened section of the Outer Circle line from Deepdene railway station. Three loop sidings were provided, along with a headshunt, and there was a dead end extension at the Riversdale end. The headshunt, which crossed Normanby Road, was abolished around 1935 to eliminate the level crossing, and the sidings became dead-end. Goods services were withdrawn on 6 September 1943, and the line back to Riversdale closed.

The station buildings were still present in 1926-1927.
