= Canterbury railway station, Melbourne =

Railway station in Melbourne, Australia

Canterbury
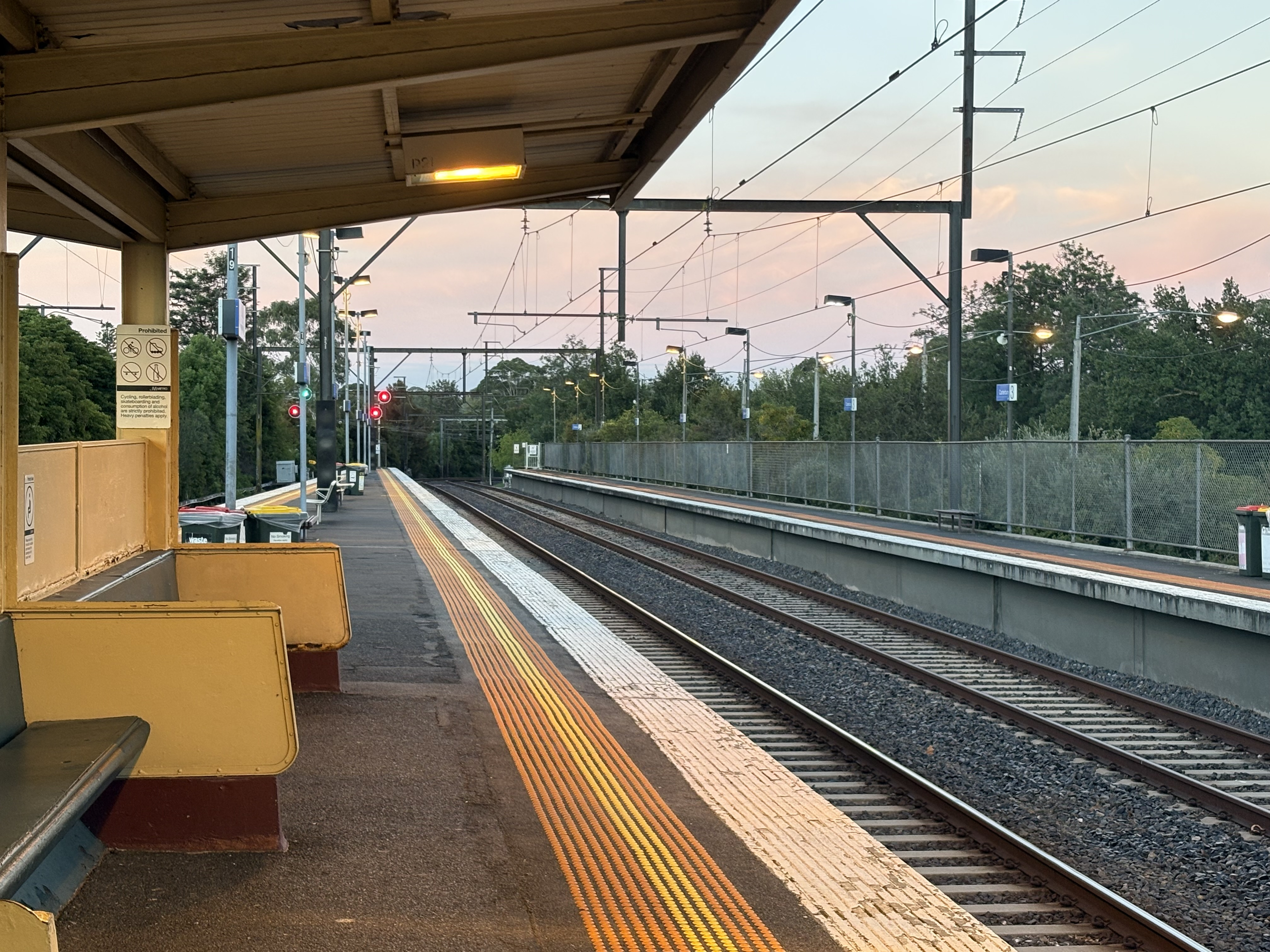
- Westbound view from Platform 2 in March 2026

General information
- Location: Canterbury Road, Canterbury, Victoria 3126; City of Boroondara; Australia
- Coordinates: 37°49′28″S 145°04′53″E
- System: PTV commuter rail station
- Owner: VicTrack
- Operator: Metro Trains
- Lines: Belgrave; Lilydale
- Distance: 12.21 kilometres from Southern Cross
- Platforms: 3 (1 island, 1 side)
- Tracks: 3
- Connections: Bus

Construction
- Structure type: Elevated
- Parking: 125
- Cycle facilities: Yes
- Accessible: No — steep ramp

Other information
- Status: Operational, unstaffed
- Station code: CBY
- Fare zone: Myki zone 1/2
- Website: Public Transport Victoria

History
- Opened: 1 December 1882; 143 years ago
- Rebuilt: 15 September 1968; 19 December 1971
- Electrified: December 1922 (1500 V DC overhead)

Passengers
- 2005–2006: 282,931
- 2006–2007: 322,219 ▲13.88%
- 2007–2008: 350,138 ▲8.66%
- 2008–2009: 373,434 ▲6.65%
- 2009–2010: 369,572 ▼1.03%
- 2010–2011: 400,612 ▲8.39%
- 2011–2012: 374,332 ▼6.56%
- 2012–2013: Not measured
- 2013–2014: 381,587 ▲1.93%
- 2014–2015: 377,580 ▼1.05%
- 2015–2016: 399,094 ▲5.69%
- 2016–2017: 388,187 ▼2.73%
- 2017–2018: 377,117 ▼2.85%
- 2018–2019: 374,650 ▼0.65%
- 2019–2020: 284,700 ▼24%
- 2020–2021: 122,400 ▼57%
- 2021–2022: 145,650 ▲18.99%
- 2022–2023: 160,850 ▲10.43%
- 2023–2024: 246,900 ▲53.5%
- 2024–2025: 268,450 ▲8.73%

Services
| Preceding station | Metro Trains | Following station |
|---|---|---|
| East Camberwell towards Flinders Street | Lilydale line | Chatham towards Lilydale |
| East Camberwell towards Flinders Street | Belgrave line | Chatham towards Belgrave |
Track layout
Location

Canterbury station is a railway station operated by Metro Trains Melbourne on the Belgrave and Lilydale lines, which are part of the Melbourne rail network. It serves the eastern suburb of Canterbury, in Melbourne, Victoria, Australia. Canterbury station is an elevated unstaffed station, featuring three platforms, an island platform with two faces and one side platform. It opened on 1 December 1882, with the current station provided in 1968 and platform 3 in 1971.

== History ==
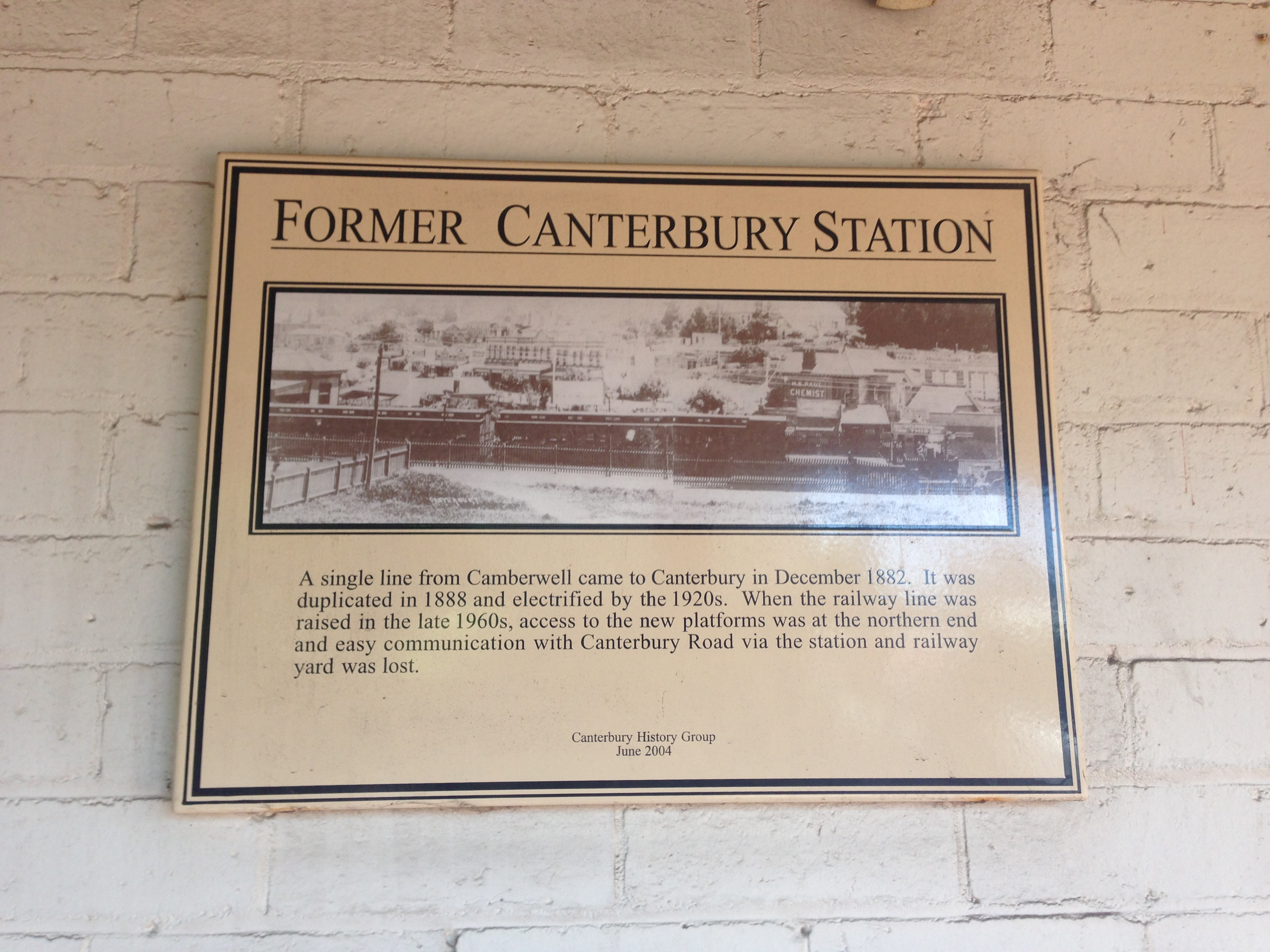
The plaque for the former Canterbury station, December 2019

Canterbury station opened on 1 December 1882, when the railway line from Camberwell was extended to Lilydale. Like the suburb itself, the station was named after Viscount Canterbury, Governor of Victoria between 1866 and 1873.

In the 1930s, a crossover was provided at the southern (up) end of the station, and a signal box provided to work the interlocked level crossing gates.

In early 1966, work on the grade separation of the Canterbury Road level crossing commenced. To facilitate construction, the interlocked gates were replaced with boom barriers, and the signal box was abolished. On 15 September 1968, the current station opened, with all works completed by December of that year. The works involved raising the station six metres, and the use of a temporary track to keep services operating. In December 1971, services on the third track from East Camberwell were extended though the station to Box Hill.

== Platforms and services ==
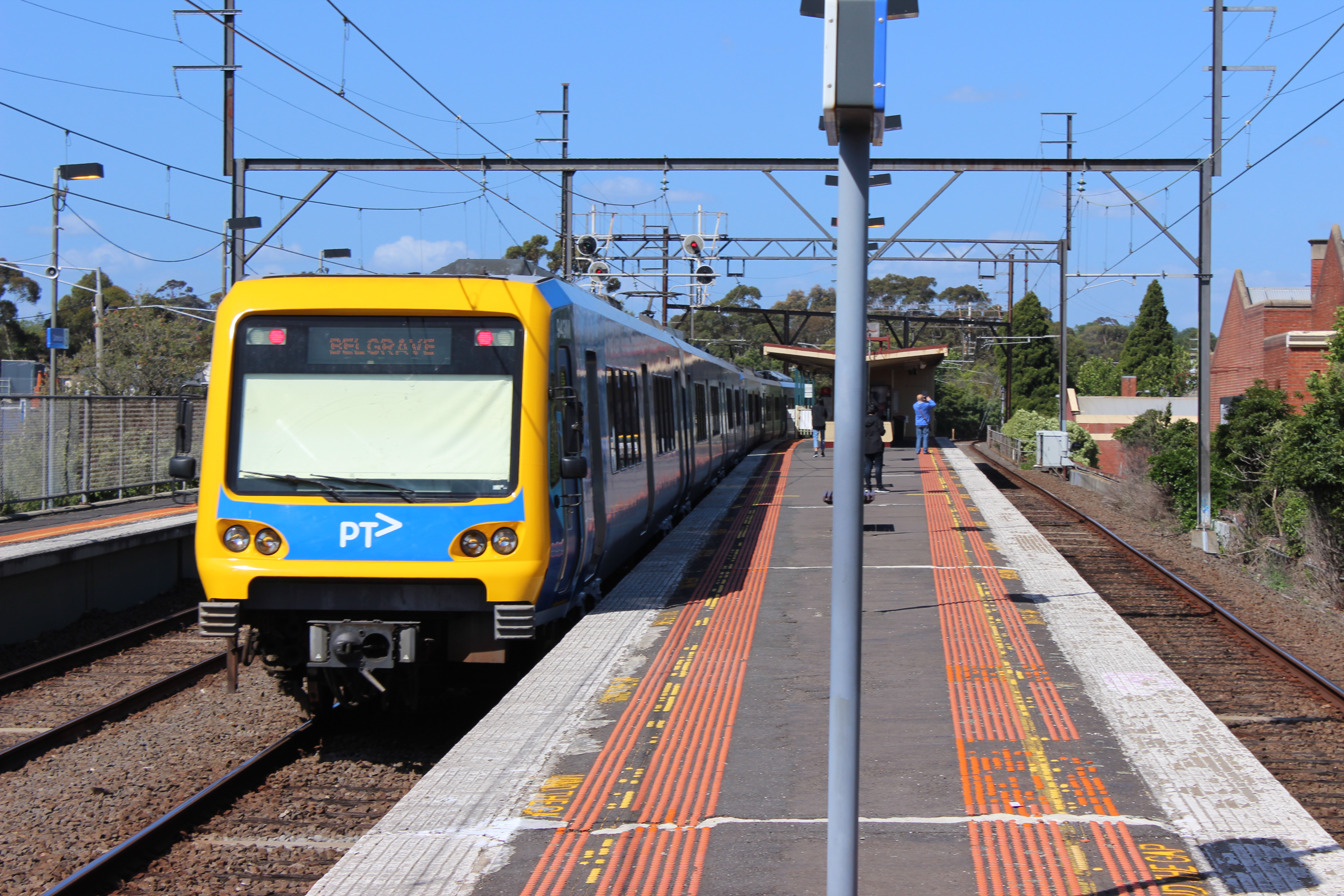
An X'Trapolis set on a Belgrave-bound service departs Platform 2, December 2019

Canterbury has one island platform with two faces and one side platform. It is serviced by Metro Trains' Belgrave and Lilydale line services.

Canterbury platform arrangement
| Platform | Line | Destination | Via | Service Type | Notes | Source |
|---|---|---|---|---|---|---|
| 1 | Belgrave line Lilydale line | Flinders Street | City Loop | All stations and limited express services | See City Loop for operating patterns | |
| 2 | Belgrave line Lilydale line | Lilydale, Belgrave | | All stations | Weekends only. | |
| 3 | Belgrave line Lilydale line | Blackburn, Ringwood, Lilydale, Belgrave | | All stations | Weekdays only. | |

== Transport links ==
Kinetic Melbourne operates one bus route via Canterbury station, under contract to Public Transport Victoria:

- 285 : Doncaster Park & Ride – Camberwell Shopping Centre
