= Paterson Bros. =

Australian art decorating firm

The Paterson Bros.
- Company type: Art decorating firm
- Industry: Interior decoration, costume design, scenic art
- Founded: 1873
- Founders: James Paterson, Hugh Paterson, Charles Stewart Paterson
- Headquarters: Melbourne, Victoria, Australia
- Key people: James Paterson (President, Painters and Decorators Guild); Hugh Paterson (costume designer)

The Paterson Bros. Melbourne’s leading art decorating firm, consisting of brothers James, Charles Stewart and Hugh Paterson, was established in 1873. (From the 1870s, the term ‘art decorator’ in Australia implied the work of a decorator who strove to achieve a balance of beauty and functionality in interior ornamentation). Due to the prosperity in Victoria following the gold rush of the 1850s, talented art decorators from around the world made their way to Victoria during the 1870s and 1880s, forming a large and distinct group of cosmopolitan artists who enriched the interiors of many private and public buildings across the state.

== The Paterson Brothers ==
James Paterson was born in Dundee, Scotland and trained as an apprentice with Purdie, Bonnar and Carfrae, the most eminent house painters and decorators in Scotland before travelling to Australia in 1873. James Paterson became the first President of the Painters and Decorators Guild. Hugh Paterson was born at Kirkcaldy, Scotland and was educated at the Grammar School, Musselburgh. He began decorating with his brother James upon his arrival in Australia in 1873 while also studying art at the Melbourne National Gallery. In 1879, Hugh returned to Scotland for two years where he worked as a figure decorator with Cornelius, a famous art decorator in Scotland. In 1886, Hugh Paterson returned to Scotland with scenic artist George Gordon, with the purpose of studying the best European art to apply to their ever growing business in Melbourne (see excerpt from The Austral Chronicle : a bi-weekly journal below). Hugh’s skills set went beyond art decoration as he was regarded as the finest costume designer in the Commonwealth. He was the designer of the costumes for the 1891 Leslie production of ‘Cinderella’ which were then used during the subsequent London, Berlin and St. Petersburg performances.

== Works in Melbourne ==
The Paterson Brothers rose to prominence through the reputation of the firm’s work at the 1880 Melbourne International Exhibition at the Royal Exhibition Building and for the art decorations of William Kerr Thompson’s mansion, Kamesburgh in North Brighton in 1880-81. The firm was soon engaged to paint and decorate notable Melbourne landmarks such as the Library at State Parliament House in 1882, the ballroom and private apartments of Government House in 1890, the Melbourne Town Hall in 1887, the South Melbourne Town Hall, the Union Bank, Colonial Bank, the Royal Bank and the residences of Messrs. Langdale, Mackinnon, Bowes Kelly, Langhee, H. T Payne, Andrew Chirnside, Everade Browne, Sybil Curne, Charles Ayrer and F.S. Grimwade. Other notable commissions included The Palace Hotel in Bourke St, Bracknell in Toorak for Matthew Davis, and the recently restored Victorian Trades Hall "Old" Chamber (1884, restored 2020). In 1883-84 the Paterson Bros. were also commissioned by William Greenlaw to lavishly decorate the interior of Villa Alba Museum, Kew

C.S. Paterson opened Melbourne’s first custom-designed artists’ residential studios at 9 Collins Street in April 1888 and naturally titled the fashionable new building ‘Grosvenor Chambers’. Two of its earliest tenants were the local women artists, Clara Southern and Jane Sutherland.
