= Kew Police Station and Court House =

Building in Melbourne, Australia

Kew Police Station and Court House (former)
- The former police station and court house (far left), the former post office (centre) and the Kew War Memorial (right)

- Location of the former police station and court house in Greater Metropolitan Melbourne

General information
- Status: Completed
- Type: Police station (1888–c. 2000); Court house (1888–1982); Community use (since 2007– )
- Architectural style: Federation Queen Anne Revival
- Location: 188 High Street, Kew, City of Boroondara, Melbourne, Victoria, Australia
- Coordinates: 37°48′24″S 145°01′54″E
- Year built: 1886–1888
- Completed: 1888; 138 years ago
- Opened: 9 May 1888
- Owner: Victorian Government (1886–2007); City of Boroondara (since 2007)

Technical details
- Material: Red bricks; concrete render; slate; terracotta

Design and construction
- Architects: John Henry Harvey; George Watson (supervision)
- Developer: Public Works Department (Victoria)
- Main contractor: P. Platt

Website
- boroondara.vic.gov.au

Victorian Heritage Register
- Official name: Kew Police Station and Former Court House
- Type: Registered place
- Designated: 20 August 1992
- Reference no.: VHR H0944
- Heritage overlay no.: HO69
- Category: Law Enforcement

Register of the National Estate
- Official name: Courthouse and Post Office (former)
- Type: Defunct register
- Designated: undated
- Part of: Kew Police Station, Courthouse and Post Office (former)
- Reference no.: 14229

The Kew Police Station and Court House is a former police station and former court house, now used for a range of community uses, located at 188 High Street in Kew, in the City of Boroondara, in the inner eastern suburbs of Melbourne, in Victoria, Australia. The building operated as a police station and court house from 1888 until 1995. In 2007, the building was purchased by the City of Boroondara for community use.

Built between 1886 and 1888 on the traditional lands of the Wurundjeri people, the former police station and court house complex was added to the Victorian Heritage Register on 20 August 1992 in recognition of its historical and architectural significance; and was also added to the non-statutory and now defunct Register of the National Estate as part of a complex of three government buildings.

== History ==
In the 1880s, a campaign for new public offices developed in Kew. This complex of buildings, incorporating the former Kew Police Station and Court House and the former Kew Post Office – also included on the Victorian Heritage Register – was designed in the Federation Queen Anne Revival style in 1886 by John Henry Harvey under the supervision of George Watson, both of the Public Works Department. The complex was constructed by P. Platt between 1886 and 1888, and the official opening took place on 9 May 1888.

The complex was built by the Victorian Government and, in 1901, following Federation, the post office building was transferred to the Commonwealth's Postmaster-General's Department, established to formalise colonial postal services; later reorganised as the Australian Postal Commission and, since 1975, as the Australian Postal Corporation, known as Australia Post.

No longer fit for use, the court house ceased operations from 1982; and police services were subsequently transferred to the Boroondara Police Station, located at 34 Harp Road, in c. 2000.

The former police station and court house buildings were subsequently decommissioned and sold to the City of Boroondara in 2007, supported by the Kew Historical Society that raised over $500,000 for the building's restoration. In 2011, the former court house was repurposed as a community hub for exhibitions and events. Since 2026, the former police station building has housed the Kew Historical Society and an art gallery.

Located immediately at the front of the former post office is the Kew War Memorial, built in 1925, also included on the Victorian Heritage Register.

== Description ==
The complex of three buildings is one of the most impressive groups of public buildings in Victoria and as an unusual combination of government buildings. The complex demonstrates an unusual unified design solution, with the former post office taking full advantage of its location at Kew Junction, the apex of the Y-shaped road intersection, for maximum public access.

They are built in the Queen Anne Revival style in red brick and render, with render banding and ornamentation defining the edges of the buildings with quoining and pilasters and the openings with architraves and ornamentation. The roofs are in slate, and the former courthouse has a terracotta ridge cap, while all three have red-brick chimneys with strapwork and corbelling. This complex of buildings were one of the first in Victoria to adopt the Queen Anne Revival style and were an influential precursor to Edwardian architecture. Of the three buildings in the complex, the former post office is the most prominent building. It is a large two-storeyed building with steeply pitched hipped roof, enriched stuccoed window surrounds, red body bricks and pedimented parapet with clock face. Enriched stuccoed panels on the chimney shafts are characteristic.

=== Building condition ===
As of 1996, the former police station was generally in good condition and appeared to be maintained. The slate roof was intact with some lichen growth, visible minor repairs, and new metal capping. The rainwater goods are intact, some being new additions. Original rainwater goods were corroding. The red brick chimneys and flues were intact although there was some organic growth visible at the top of the chimneys. The red brick walls with painted render moulding around doors, windows, and between ground and first floor, and first floor and roof, were intact, with some loss of mortar in the brickwork. The painted timber window frames and doors were aged and there was minor paint loss. The area in front of the police station had a bitumen-covered path flanked by grass beds either side and the area was well maintained.

The former court house, as of 1996, was in similarly good condition. Some of the terracotta tiles on the roof ridge had been lost. The original recessed rainwater goods were leaking, evidenced by moss growth on the walls either side. There was some graffiti damage to the front facade. The metal roofing material on the tower was intact. There appeared to have been some movement in the basalt ledge in front of the main wall and the open joints were filled with weeds.

== See also ==
- Architecture of Melbourne
- List of places on the Victorian Heritage Register in the City of Boroondara
