= List of acts of the Parliament of Victoria from 1876 =

This is a list of acts of the Parliament of Victoria, Australia for the year 1876.

== 1876 ==
Continuing the second session of the eighth parliament of Victoria.

Short title, or popular name	Citation	Royal assent
Long title
	39 Vict. No. 516	15 February 1876
An Act to apply out of the Consolidated Revenue the sum of Five hundred and forty thousand two hundred pounds to the service of the year One thousand eight hundred and seventy-five and six.
	39 Vict. No. 517	7 April 1876
An Act to apply a sum out of the Consolidated Revenue to the service of the year ending on the last day of June One thousand eight hundred and seventy-six, and to appropriate the Supplies granted in this Session of Parliament.
	39 Vict. No. 518	7 April 1876
An Act to define the Boundaries of Bailiwicks. (Repealed by Supreme Court Act 1890 (54 Vict. No. 1142))
	39 Vict. No. 519	7 April 1876
An Act for the continuation of an expiring law.
	39 Vict. No. 520	7 April 1876
An Act to continue an expiring law.
	39 Vict. No. 521	7 April 1876
An Act to facilitate the Proof of Bye-laws and Proceedings of Corporations, and for other purposes. (Repealed by Evidence Act 1890 (54 Vict. No. 1088))
	39 Vict. No. 522	7 April 1876
An Act to amend the Law relating to Cheques Bills of Exchange and Promissory Notes. (Repealed by Bills of Exchange Act 1883 (47 Vict. No. 772))
Duties on Estates Amendment Act 1876 (repealed)	39 Vict. No. 523	7 April 1876
An Act to amend the "Duties on the Estates of Deceased Persons Statute 1870." (Note: Duties on the Estates of Deceased Persons Statute 1870 (34 Vict. No. 388)) (Repealed by Administration and Probate Act 1890 (54 Vict. No. 1160))
Public Health Amendment Act 1876 (repealed)	39 Vict. No. 524	7 April 1876
An Act to amend the Laws relating to or affecting Public Health. (Repealed by Public Health Amendment Statute 1883 (47 Vict. No. 782))
	39 Vict. No. 525	7 April 1876
An Act to enable the Council of the University of Melbourne to confer Degrees in Surgery. (Repealed by University Act 1881 (45 Vict. No. 691))
Bank Notes Tax Act 1876 (repealed)	39 Vict. No. 526	7 April 1876
An Act to impose a Tax upon Bank Notes. (Repealed by Banks and Currency Act 1890 (54 Vict. No. 1164))
	39 Vict. No. 527	7 April 1876
An Act to amend "The Medical Practitioners Statute 1865." (Note: Medical Practitioners Statute 1865 (28 Vict. No. 262)) (Repealed by Medical Act 1890 (54 Vict. No. 1118))
Post Office Amendment Act 1876 (repealed)	39 Vict. No. 528	7 April 1876
An Act to further amend "The Post Office Statute 1866." (Note: Post Office Statute 1866 (29 Vict. No. 298)) (Repealed by Post Office Act 1883 (47 Vict. No. 781))
	39 Vict. No. 529	7 April 1876
An Act to sanction the issue and application of certain Sums of Money from "The Railway Loan Liquidation and Construction Account," established under the provision of section forty-two of 33 Victoria No. 360. (Note: Land Act 1869 (33 Vict. No. 360))
	39 Vict. No. 530	7 April 1876
An Act to amend "The Railway Construction Act 1873." (Note: Railway Construction Act 1873 (37 Vict. No. 475))
Railway Loan Act 1876	39 Vict. No. 531	7 April 1876
An Act to authorize the raising of Money for Railways and for other purposes.
	39 Vict. No. 532	7 April 1876
An Act to further amend "The Police Offences Statute 1865" (Note: Police Offences Statute 1865 (28 Vict. No. 265)) and "The Police Offences Statute Amendment Act 1872." (Note: Police Offences Statute Amendment Act 1872 (36 Vict. No. 424)) (Repealed by Police Offences Act 1890 (54 Vict. No. 1126))
	39 Vict. No. 533	
An Act to amend "The Local Government Act 1874." (Note: Local Government Act 1874 (38 Vict. No. 506))
	39 Vict. No. 534	
An Act to extend the time for the Collection of Tolls.

The third session of the eighth parliament of Victoria.

Short title, or popular name	Citation	Royal assent
Long title
	40 Vict. No. 535	27 July 1876
An Act to amend "The Railway Loan Act 1876." (Note: Railway Loan Act 1876 (39 Vict. No. 531))
	40 Vict. No. 536	27 July 1876
An Act to apply out of the Consolidated Revenue the sum of Forty thousand six hundred and ninety-three pounds seventeen shillings to the service of the year One thousand eight hundred and seventy-five and six, and the sum of Five hundred and seventy-four thousand nine hundred pounds to the service of the year One thousand eight hundred and seventy-six and seven.
	40 Vict. No. 537	31 August 1876
An Act to sanction the issue and expenditure of certain sums from "The Public Works Loan Account 1872" for Salaries Wages and Contingencies for the service of the year ending the Thirtieth day of June One thousand eight hundred and seventy-seven.
	40 Vict. No. 538	31 August 1876
An Act to amend "The Local Government Act 1874." (Note: Local Government Act 1874 (38 Vict. No. 506))
Trade Marks Registration Act 1876 (repealed)	40 Vict. No. 539	19 September 1876
An Act to establish a Register of Trade Marks. (Repealed by Trade Marks Act 1890 (54 Vict. No. 1146))
	40 Vict. No. 540	19 September 1876
An Act to apply out of the Consolidated Revenue the sum of Five hundred and seventy-three thousand eight hundred and fifty pounds to the service of the year One thousand eight hundred and seventy-six and seven.
Education Act Amendment Act 1876 (repealed)	40 Vict. No. 541	24 October 1876
An Act to amend the Law relating to Education. (Repealed by Education Act 1890 (54 Vict. No. 1086))
	40 Vict. No. 542	24 October 1876
An Act to establish and regulate a Permanent Fund in connection with the Australasian Dramatic and Musical Association.
	40 Vict. No. 543	24 October 1876
An Act to further amend "The Local Governing Bodies Loan Act 1872," (Note: Local Governing Bodies Loan Act 1872 (36 Vict. No. 448)) and to amend "An Act to amend the Local Governing Bodies Loan Act 1872." (Note: 38 Vict. No. 500) (Repealed by Water Act 1890 (54 Vict. No. 1156))
	40 Vict. No. 544	24 October 1876
An Act for more effectually preventing the Sale of Obscene Books, Pictures, Prints, and other Articles. (Repealed by Police Offences Act 1890 (54 Vict. No. 1126))
Colonial Bank of Australasia Act 1876	40 Vict. No. 545	2 November 1876
An Act to continue the powers of an Act intituled "An Act to Incorporate the Proprietors of a certain Banking Company to be called 'The Colonial Bank of Australasia' and for other purposes." (Note: Colonial Bank of Australasia Act 1856 (19 Vict.))
Old Metal Dealers Act 1876 (repealed)	40 Vict. No. 546	2 November 1876
An Act for regulating the business of Dealers in Old Metals, and for other purposes. (Repealed by Marine Stores and Old Metals Act 1890 (54 Vict. No. 1114))
Emerald Hill Town Hall Act 1876	40 Vict. No. 547	2 November 1876
An Act to enable the Emerald Hill Council to sell and purchase Land and to erect Municipal and other Buildings and for other purposes.
Electoral Act Amendment Act 1876 (repealed)	40 Vict. No. 548	2 November 1876
An Act to amend "The Electoral Act 1865." (Note: Electoral Act 1865 (29 Vict. No. 279)) (Repealed by Constitution Act Amendment Act 1890 (54 Vict. No. 1075))
	40 Vict. No. 549	30 November 1876
An Act to amend "The Friendly Societies Statute 1865." (Note: Friendly Societies Statute 1865 (28 Vict. No. 254)) (Repealed by Friendly Societies Act 1890 (54 Vict. No. 1094))
	40 Vict. No. 550	30 November 1876
An Act to apply out of the Consolidated Revenue the sum of Three hundred thousand pounds to the service of the year One thousand eight hundred and seventy-six and seven.
	40 Vict. No. 551	22 December 1876
An Act to apply a sum out of the Consolidated Revenue to the service of the year ending on the last day of June One thousand eight hundred and seventy-seven, and to appropriate the Supplies granted in this Session of Parliament.
Melbourne Harbor Trust Act 1876 (repealed)	40 Vict. No. 552	22 December 1876
An Act to provide for the Regulation Management and Improvement of the Port of Melbourne and certain portions of the River Yarra Yarra and certain portions of the Saltwater River and for other purposes connected therewith. (Repealed by Melbourne Harbor Trust Act 1890 (54 Vict. No. 1119))
	40 Vict. No. 553	22 December 1876
An Act for the continuation of an expiring law.
	40 Vict. No. 554	22 December 1876
An Act to continue an Expiring Law. (Note: Diseases in Stock Act 1872 (36 Vict. No. 451))
	40 Vict. No. 555	22 December 1876
An Act for the continuation of an expiring law.
	40 Vict. No. 556	22 December 1876
An Act to amend the "County Courts Statute 1869." (Note: County Courts Statute 1869 (33 Vict. No. 345)) (Repealed by County Court Act 1890 (54 Vict. No. 1078))
	40 Vict. No. 557	22 December 1876
An Act to amend the Law relating to Bills of Sale. (Repealed by Instruments Act 1890 (54 Vict. No. 1103))
Pharmacy Act 1876 (repealed)	40 Vict. No. 558	22 December 1876
An Act to establish a Board of Pharmacy in Victoria. (Repealed by Medical Act 1890 (54 Vict. No. 1118))
Sale and Use of Poisons Act 1876 (repealed)	40 Vict. No. 559	22 December 1876
An Act for regulating the Sale and Use of Poisons. (Repealed by Poisons Act 1890 (54 Vict. No. 1125))
Juries Statute 1876	40 Vict. No. 560	22 December 1876
An Act to amend the Law relating to Juries.
	40 Vict. No. 561	22 December 1876
An Act to amend the Law relating to the right of Stoppage in Transitu, (Note: Stoppage in transitu is a legal right that lets an unpaid seller stop the delivery of goods and take them back while they are still on the way to the buyer.) and for other purposes. (Repealed by Instruments Act 1890 (54 Vict. No. 1103))
Crossed Cheques Act 1876 (repealed)	40 Vict. No. 562	22 December 1876
An Act for amending the Law relating to Crossed Cheques. (Repealed by Bills of Exchange Act 1883 (47 Vict. No. 772))
State Forests Act 1876 (repealed)	40 Vict. No. 563	22 December 1876
An Act to provide for the Care Management and Control of State Forests Timber Reserves and other Crown Lands and for other purposes. (Repealed by Land Act 1890 (54 Vict. No. 1106))
	40 Vict. No. 564	22 December 1876
An Act to further amend "The Local Government Act 1874," and the Act No. 54. (Note: 21 Vict. No. 54)
	40 Vict. No. 565	22 December 1876
An Act to amend the Law relating to Justices of the Peace and for other purposes.
Licensing Act 1876 (repealed)	40 Vict. No. 566	22 December 1876
An Act to consolidate and amend the Laws relating to the Licensing of Public Houses and the Sale of Fermented and Spirituous Liquors. (Repealed by Licensing Act 1885 (49 Vict. No. 857))

== Sources ==
- "1876 Victorian Historical Acts". AustLII.
