= Kew Post Office =

Heritage-listed former post office in Melbourne, Victoria, Australia

Kew Post Office (former)
- The former post office (left), with the Kew War Memorial (right)

- Location of the former post office in Greater Metropolitan Melbourne

General information
- Status: Completed
- Type: Post office (1888–1995); Restaurant (1995–2020); Hotel (since 2020– )
- Architectural style: Federation Queen Anne Revival
- Location: 186 High Street, Kew, City of Boroondara, Melbourne, Victoria, Australia
- Coordinates: 37°48′24″S 145°01′53″E
- Year built: 1886–1888
- Completed: 1888; 138 years ago
- Opened: 9 May 1888
- Owner: Colony of Victoria (1886–1901); Postmaster-General's Department (1901–1975); Australia Post (1975–1995); private ownership (since 1995)

Technical details
- Material: Red bricks; concrete render; slate

Design and construction
- Architects: John Henry Harvey; George Watson (supervision)
- Developer: Public Works Department (Victoria)
- Main contractor: P. Platt

Website
- postmasterhotel.com

Victorian Heritage Register
- Official name: Former Kew Post Office
- Type: Registered place
- Designated: 28 August 1991
- Reference no.: VHR H0885
- Heritage overlay no.: HO68
- Category: Postal and Telecommunications

Register of the National Estate
- Official name: Kew Post Office (former)
- Type: Defunct register
- Designated: undated
- Part of: Kew Police Station, Courthouse and Post Office (former)
- Reference no.: 14229

The Kew Post Office is a former post office, now hotel, located at 186 High Street in Kew, in the City of Boroondara, in the inner eastern suburbs of Melbourne, in Victoria, Australia. The building operated as a post office from 1888 until 1995, then as a restaurant, and since 2020 as a hotel.

Built between 1886 and 1888 on the traditional lands of the Wurundjeri people, the former post office was added to the Victorian Heritage Register on 28 August 1991 in recognition of its historical and architectural significance; and was also added to the non-statutory and now defunct Register of the National Estate as part of a complex of three government buildings.

== History ==
Postal deliveries from the General Post Office, Melbourne to Kew were being made from 1856; and, by 1878, there was a post office at Kew. In the 1880s, a campaign for new public offices developed in Kew. This complex of buildings, incorporating the former Kew Post Office and the former Kew Police Station and Court House – also included on the Victorian Heritage Register – was designed in the Federation Queen Anne Revival style in 1886 by John Henry Harvey under the supervision of George Watson, both of the Public Works Department. The complex was constructed by P. Platt between 1886 and 1888, and the official opening took place on 9 May 1888.

The complex was built by the Victorian Government and, in 1901, following Federation, the post office building was transferred to the Commonwealth's Postmaster-General's Department, established to formalise colonial postal services; later reorganised as the Australian Postal Commission and, since 1975, as the Australian Postal Corporation, known as Australia Post.

The former police station and courthouse buildings were subsequently decommissioned and sold to the City of Boroondara in 2007. The former post office building was sold by Australia Post in 1995 and was converted for use as a restaurant, called QPO Restaurant. (Note: The letter "Q" is a homonym of Kew; and "PO" is a common abbreviation of post office.) In 2020, the building was repurposed as the Postmaster Hotel.

Located immediately at the front of the former post office is the Kew War Memorial, built in 1925, also included on the Victorian Heritage Register.

== Description ==
The complex of three buildings is one of the most impressive groups of public buildings in Victoria and as an unusual combination of government buildings. The complex demonstrates an unusual unified design solution, with the former post office taking full advantage of its location at Kew Junction, the apex of the Y-shaped road intersection, for maximum public access.

They are built in the Queen Anne Revival style in red brick and render, with render banding and ornamentation defining the edges of the buildings with quoining and pilasters and the openings with architraves and ornamentation. The roofs are in slate, and the former courthouse has a terracotta ridge cap, while all three have red-brick chimneys with strapwork and corbelling. This complex of buildings were one of the first in Victoria to adopt the Queen Anne Revival style and were an influential precursor to Edwardian architecture. Of the three buildings in the complex, the former post office is the most prominent building. It is a large two-storeyed building with steeply pitched hipped roof, enriched stuccoed window surrounds, red body bricks and pedimented parapet with clock face. Enriched stuccoed panels on the chimney shafts are characteristic.

=== Building condition ===
As of 1996, there was a large modern extension on the left hand side of the main facade which was unsympathetic to the original and its installation caused damage to the original render adjacent to it. The exterior of the building appeared to be poorly maintained and some repairs were only half completed. As of 1996, the slate roof was intact, but the metal capping had partially corroded. The red brick chimneys with metal flues were intact; as were the red brick walls, but had suffered both graffiti damage and some loss of mortar. The render mouldings around windows and doors and between floors were intact for the most part, but some areas near the former courthouse were badly cracked and flaking. Most render was unpainted. The painted timber doors and window frames were aged and suffered significant loss of paint. The front door was altered and a modern glass porch and doors were installed. The painted timberwork at the back of the building was painted in a range of clashing colours. The flight of steps up from the street to the main entrance was suffering from moisture penetration. There was some loss of decorative metal spikes from the top railing.

== See also ==
- Architecture of Melbourne
- List of places on the Victorian Heritage Register in the City of Boroondara
