= Kew, Victoria =

Kew
- Suburb
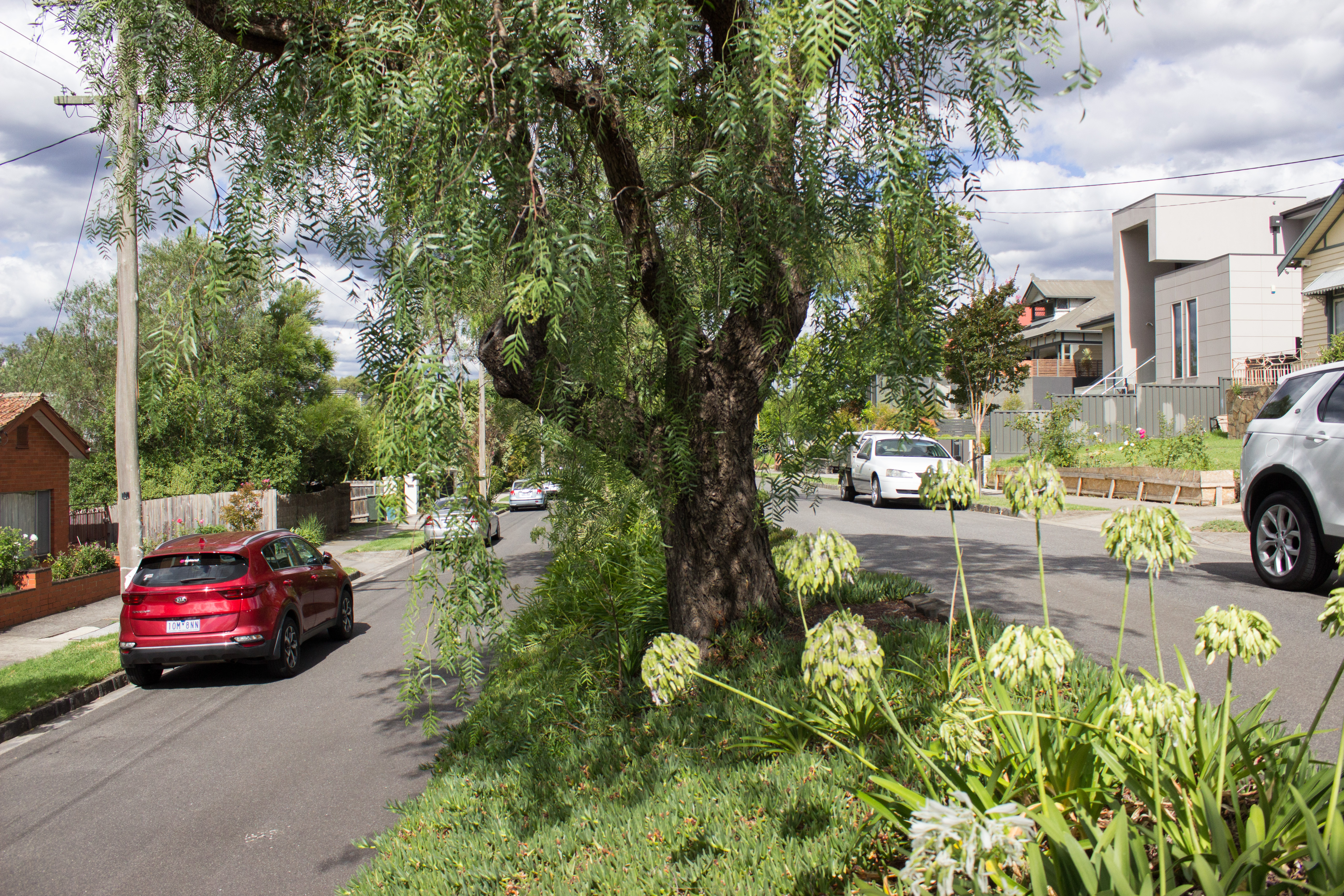
- Kellett Grove, Kew

- Interactive map of Kew
- Coordinates: 37°48′19″S 145°2′9″E
- Country: Australia
- State: Victoria
- City: Melbourne
- LGA: City of Boroondara
- Location: 6 km (3.7 mi) from Melbourne

Government
  - State electorate: Kew
  - Federal division: Kooyong

Area
  - Total: 10.5 km^{2} (4.1 sq mi)
- Elevation: 58 m (190 ft)

Population
  - Total: 24,499 (SAL 2021)
- Postcode: 3101
Suburbs around Kew
Alphington	Kew East	Balwyn North
Fairfield	Kew	Balwyn
Abbotsford	Hawthorn	Hawthorn East

Kew (/kjuː/) is a suburb of Melbourne, Victoria, Australia, found 5 km east from Melbourne's Central Business District. Kew is located within the City of Boroondara local government area. Kew recorded a population of 24,499 at the 2021 census.

A city in its own right from 1860 to 1994, Kew was amalgamated with the cities of Hawthorn and Camberwell to form the City of Boroondara. The suburb borders the Yarra River to the west and northwest, with Kew East to the northeast, Hawthorn and Hawthorn East to its south, and with Balwyn, Balwyn North and Deepdene to the east.

== History ==
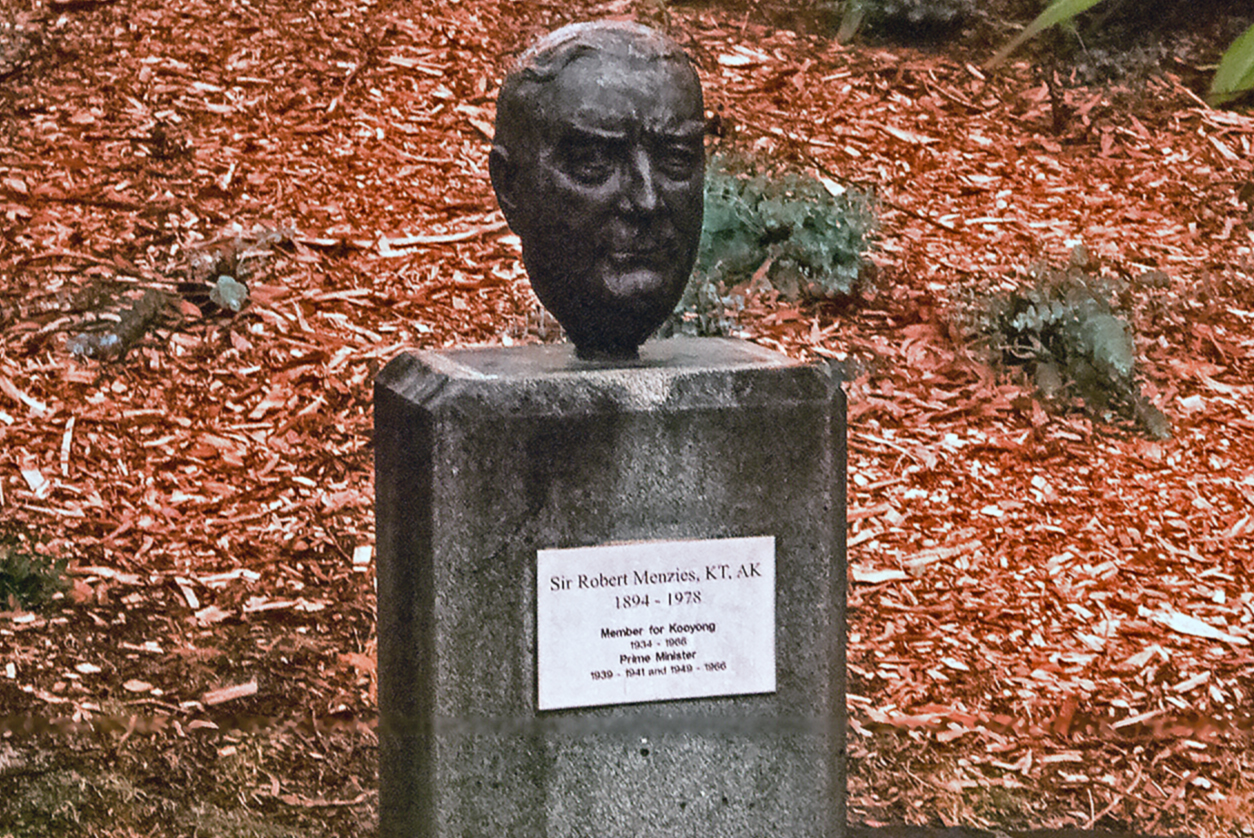
Menzies statue in Kew

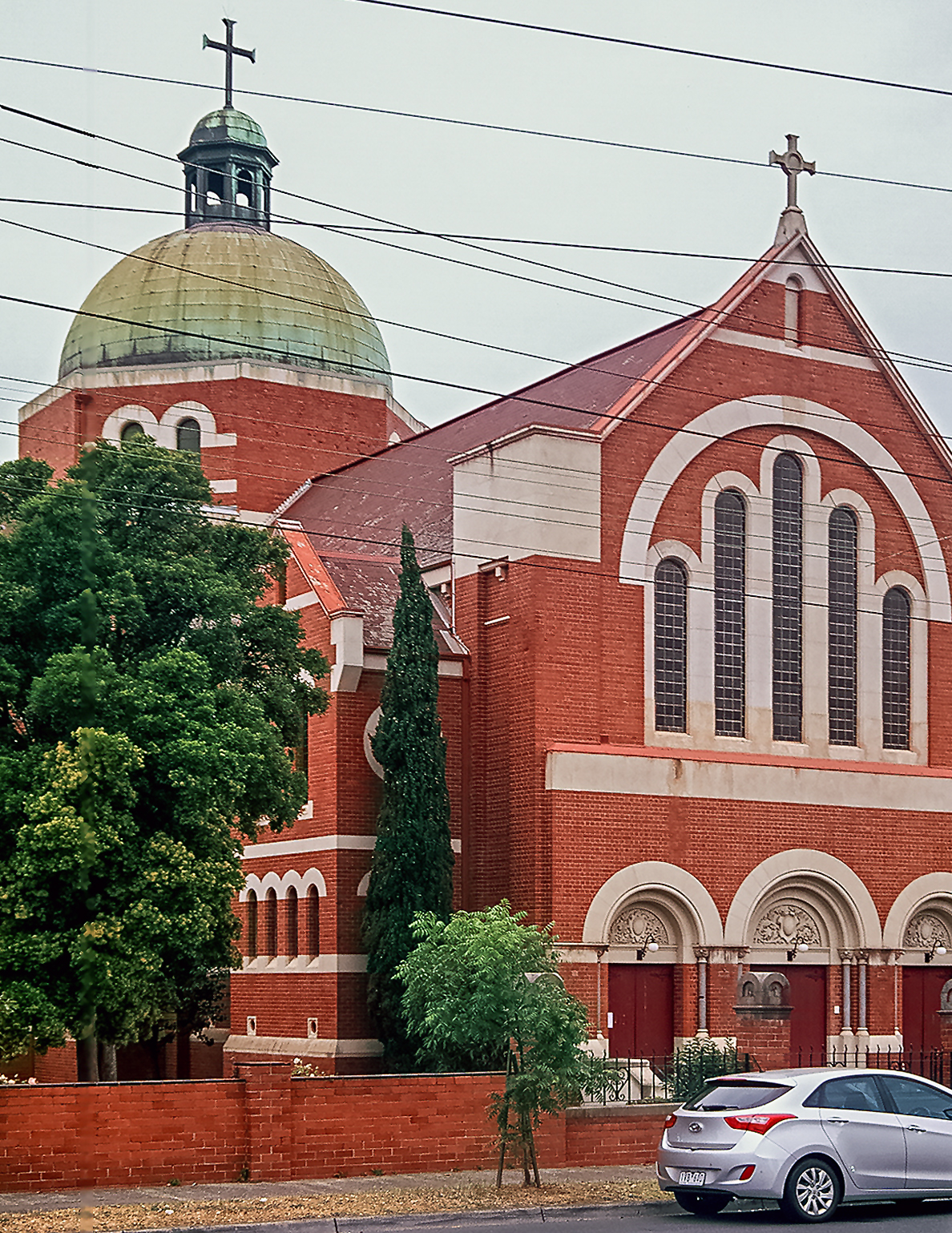
Sacred Heart Catholic Church KEW

Prior to the establishment of Melbourne, the area was inhabited by the Wurundjeri peoples. In the 1840s European settlers named it the Parish of Boroondara – meaning "a place of shade" in the Woiwurrung language. In 1838 Dight travelled down the Yarra from Heidelberg and decided to locate a water-powered mill on a site adjacent to Dights Falls; the impressive three-storey mill opened in 1840.

John Hodgson established a squatters run at Studley Park, on the eastern bank of the Yarra River, in 1840. Studley House, also known as Burke Hall, built in 1857, was named after Hodgson's birthplace of Studley, Yorkshire and the house is now on the Register of the National Estate. The house was built in the Victorian Period Italianate Revival style. Modifications were made to the house in 1875 and 1919. The house was also owned by former bookmaker, ALP lobbyist, influential Irish-Catholic and millionaire, John Wren and was donated to Xavier College by the land developer, Thomas Burke. It illustrates the importance of a residence in indicating success and status in nineteenth- and early-twentieth-century Melbourne society. The nearby Villa Alba, built before 1863, is open to the public.

In 1851, Crown land sales occurred in the area. One of the purchasers, Nicholas Fenwick, subdivided his land (which was just further out from the centre of the colony of Melbourne than the area known as Richmond) and named the region Kew, based on the thought that Kew in England was near Richmond. He also notably named its streets after British statesmen. The area quickly became a sought-after suburb for the well-to-do in Melbourne. Access to Kew was originally via Bridge Road in Richmond, crossing the Hawthorn Bridge to Burwood Road, until the privately owned Studley Park Bridge (nicknamed the Penny Bridge) opened in 1857, connecting Church Street Richmond with Studley Park.

The commercial precinct known as Kew Junction began to take shape in the 1850s. The first store was opened by Mr. J. J. French in August 1853 and the first post office on 6 October 1856, however, it was not till towards the end of the decade that many shops appeared in High Street. The Kew Hotel opened in 1855, the Prospect Hill Hotel (now the Dan Murphy's liquor store) in 1857, the Council Hotel about 1860, the Clifton (now Hotel Kew) in 1869 and the Greyhound (now the Skinny Dog Hotel) in 1874. The block of civic buildings comprising the former post office, the former court house and the former police station were built in 1888 as was the National Bank, at the corner of Walpole and High Streets.

In 1856, a site was reserved for a mental asylum next to the river. By 1871 Kew Lunatic Asylum, now known as Willsmere Estate, was completed. The Kew Cottages for children were added in 1887. The hospital was built despite objections by residents and the Kew Borough Council and provides an historical example of nimbyism. Kew Cottages and Willsmere Hospital are listed on the Victorian Heritage Register.

Various churches opened in the 1850s, with the first school opened by the Anglican Church in 1856. In 1875 Sacred Heart Primary School was opened. More private schools were opened in 1878, including Ruyton Girls' School (non-denominational) and Xavier College (Catholic in Jesuit order). Other private schools soon followed, including Methodist Ladies' College (Uniting Church in Australia) in 1882, Genazzano FCJ College in 1889, Trinity Grammar School (Anglican) in 1903, and Carey Baptist Grammar School (Baptist) in 1923. Preshil, The Margaret Lyttle Memorial School, was opened in the early 1930s. In 1960 it was said: "it would be difficult to find any locality so richly endowed with so many and such large educational institutions as are to be found in Kew."

A railway branch line to Kew from Hawthorn Station opened on 19 December 1887 and was officially closed on 13 May 1957. Kew was proclaimed a town on 8 December 1910, and a city on 10 March 1921. The population of the area tripled between 1910 and World War II.

A former house in Kew was the birthplace of the 21st Prime Minister of Australia, Gough Whitlam. As of 2016, due to its demolition, the house no longer exists.

=== Heritage listings ===
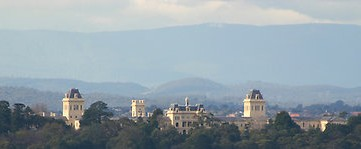
Looking towards the former Willsmere Hospital

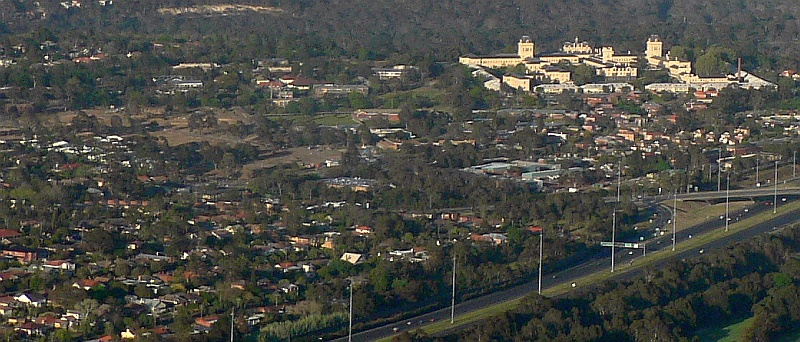
Aerial view over northern residential parts of Kew looking southwest showing Studley Park (top), Kew Asylum (right) and Eastern Freeway Earl Street exit (bottom right)

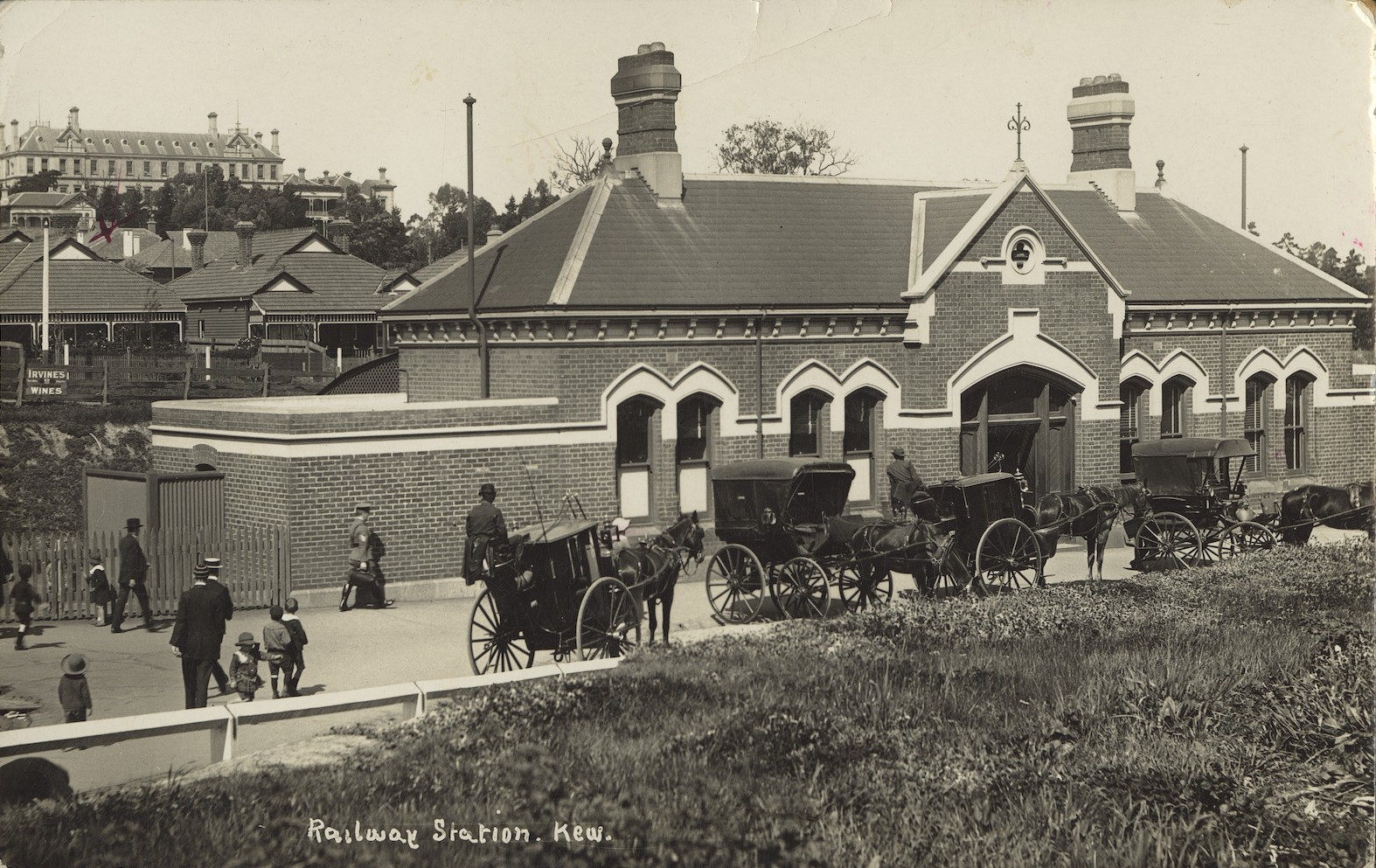
The street side of the former Kew station. Xavier College in background.

The following places in Kew are listed on the Victorian Heritage Register:

- Boroondara General Cemetery, including both the Cussen Memorial and the Springthorpe Memorial, 430–440 High Street
- Old Chandler Highway Bridge (former), Main Yarra Trail, across the Yarra River
- Clemson House, 24 Milfay Avenue
- D'Estaville, 7 Barry Street
- Dights Mill site, Off Yarra Boulevard
- Genazzano FCJ College (Wardell Building), 285–315 Cotham Road
- Kew Cottages (former), Main Driver
- Kew Police Station and Court House (former), 188 High Street and adjacent Kew Post Office (former), 186 High Street
- Kew War Memorial, High Street and Cotham Road
- Preshil School Junior campus, 395 Barkers Road
- Raheen, 96 Studley Park Road
- River House, 2 Hodgson Street
- Ross House, 292 Cotham Road
- Tram Verandah Shelter, corner Cotham and Burke roads
- Victoria Bridge, Barkers Road, across the Yarra River
- Villa Alba, 44 Walmer Street
- Walmer Street Bridge Walmer Street, across the Yarra River
- Willsmere Hospital (former), also known as the Kew Asylum, 258 Wiltshire Drive and 21 Vaughan Crescent
- Xavier College (South Wing, the West Wing, the Great Hall and the Chapel), 135 Barkers Road and Studley House, also known as Wren House, at the Burke Hall campus, 2 Nolan Avenue

=== Today ===
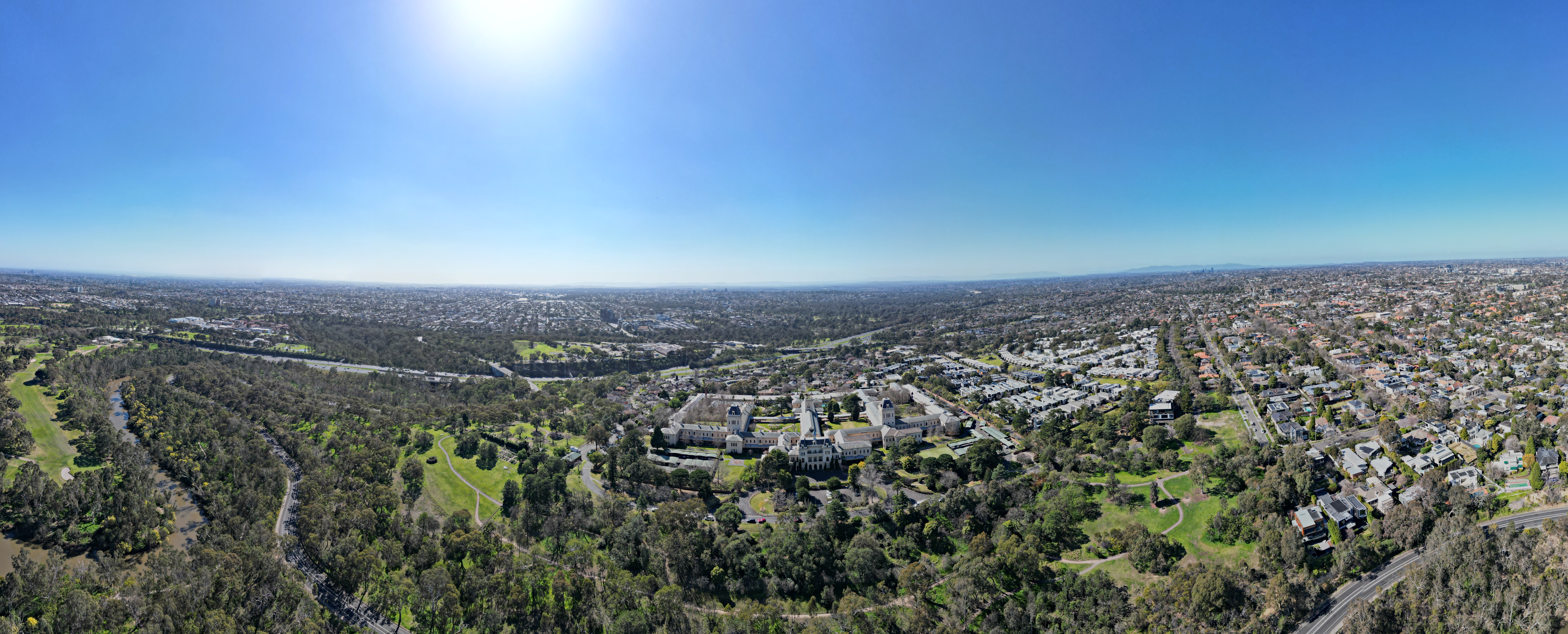
Aerial panorama of Yarra Bend Park facing the Willsmere

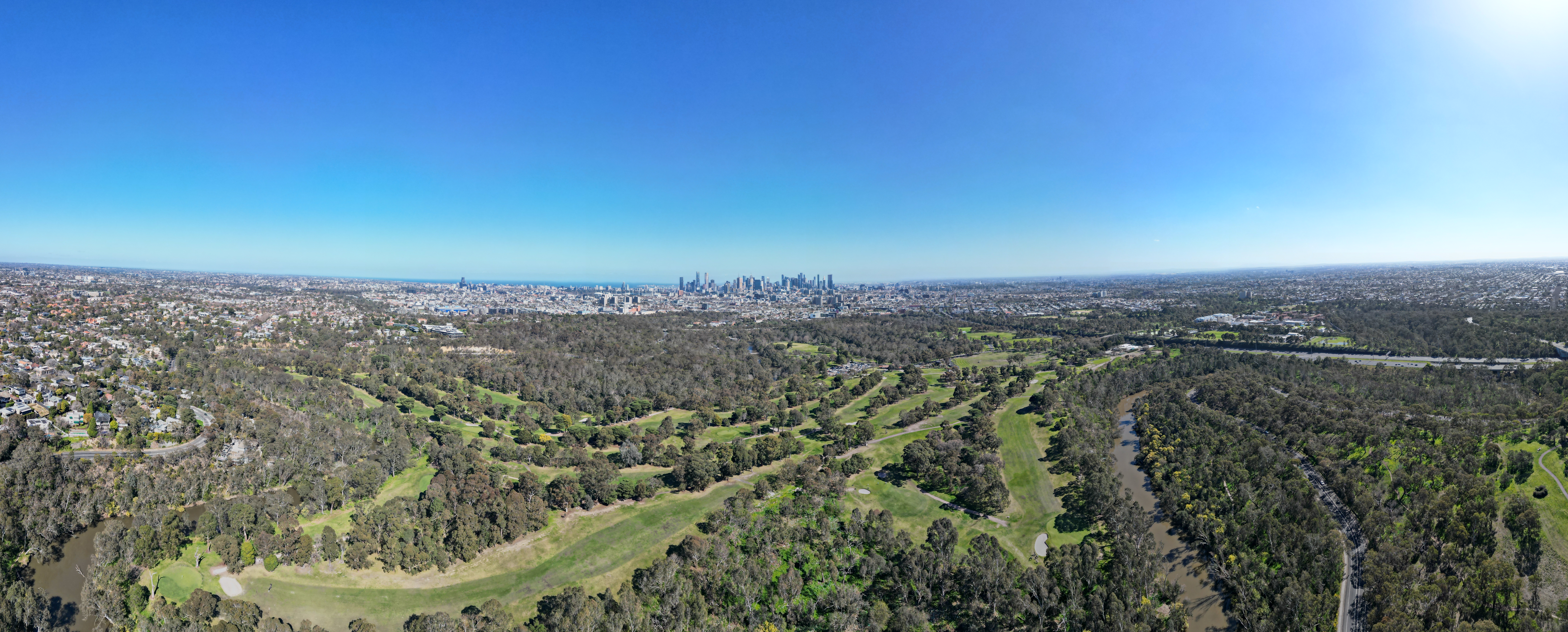
Aerial panorama of Yarra Bend Park facing Melbourne

Kew has grown steadily since the early Bridge Road crossing development and is cited as one of the most prestigious suburbs in Melbourne. As a consequence, many of these residences now attract some of the highest residential resale values in Melbourne.

Streets in the Sackville Ward (bounded by Barkers, Burke, Cotham and Glenferrie Roads), such as Alfred, Rowland, Wellington, Grange and Sackville, have some exceptional examples of Edwardian, Victorian and contemporary architecture.

The suburb has been home to numerous Scout Groups since 1st Kew was formed in 1909. Today, only 1st Kew and 4th Kew are in operation.

Kew has convenient access to public facilities and transport. The 109, 16 and 72 along with tram route 48 (North Balwyn – Victoria Harbour Docklands) tram routes pass through the suburb and the City/Lilydale/Belgrave train line is easily accessed at Hawthorn and Glenferrie Stations. Kew Station and the associated railway branch was last served by passenger trains in 1952, with the station site now the headquarters of VicRoads.

== Demographics ==
Historical population
Year	Pop.	±%
2001	22,689	—
2006	22,516	−0.8%
2011	23,876	+6.0%
2016	24,605	+3.1%
2021	24,499	−0.4%

In the 2021 Census, there were 24,499 people in Kew. 66.1% of people were born in Australia. The next most common countries of birth were China 6.6%, England 2.9%, Malaysia 2.2%, India 1.8% and New Zealand 1.4%. 70.3% of people spoke only English at home. Other languages spoken at home included Mandarin 8.6%, Greek 3.0%, Cantonese 2.8%, Italian 1.7% and Vietnamese 1.4%. The most common responses for religion were No Religion 44.1% and Catholic 22.7%.

== Education ==
- Carey Baptist Grammar School
- Genazzano FCJ College
- Kew High School
- Kew Primary School
- Methodist Ladies' College
- Preshil
- Ruyton Girls' School
- Sacred Heart Primary School
- Trinity Grammar School
- Xavier College

== Sport ==
Golfers have the choice of membership at Green Acres Golf Club, or Kew Golf Club, in Kew East, or may play at the Studley Park Par 3 Golf Course, on Studley Park Road.

Kew Football Club and Kew Cricket Club play out of Victoria Park, on High Street.

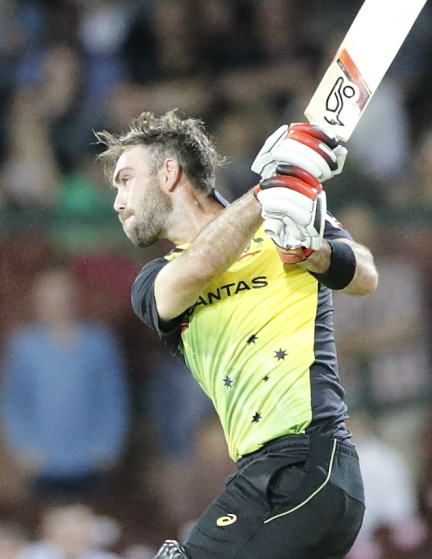
Australian cricketer Glenn Maxwell

== Notable people ==
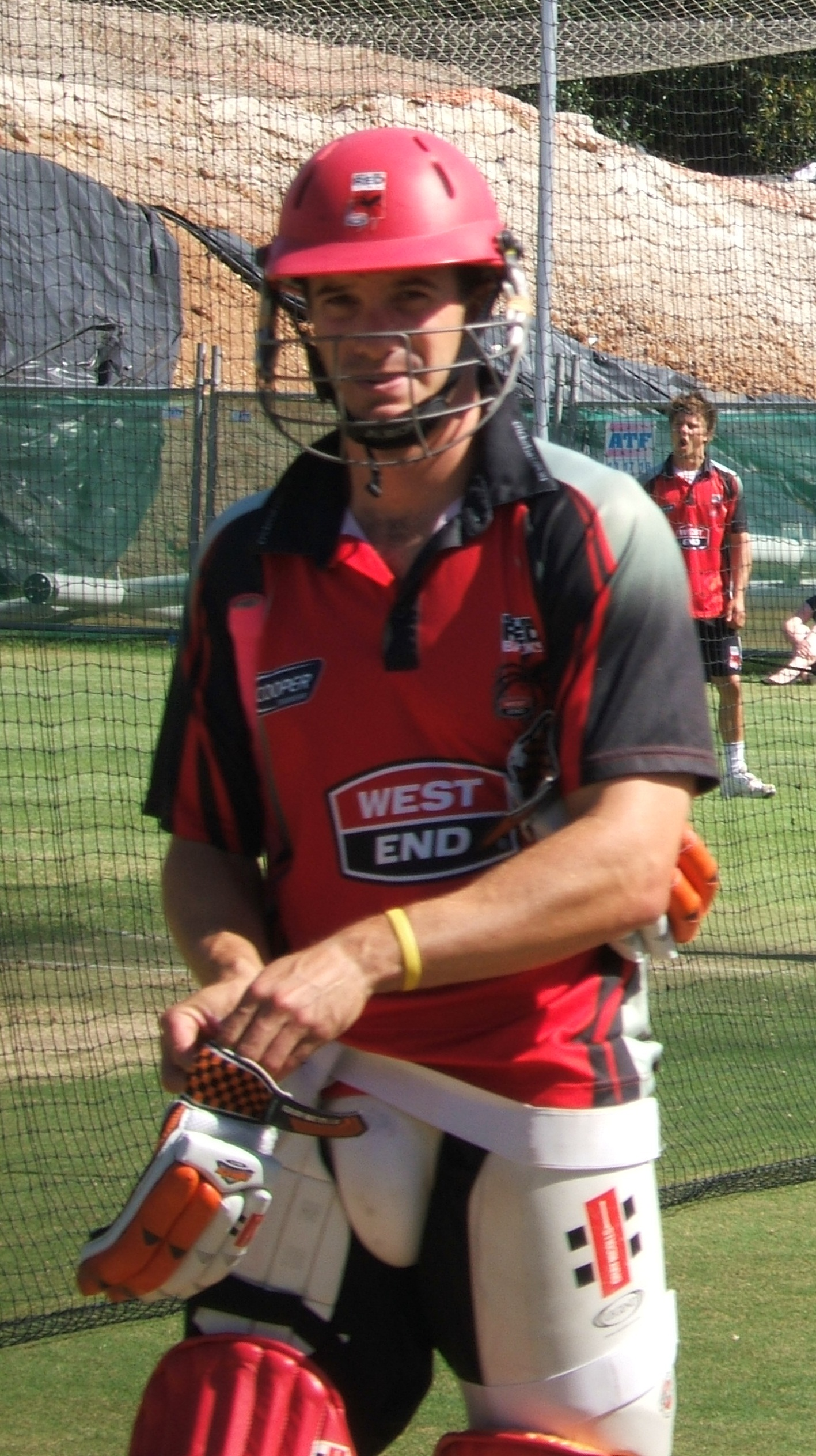
Michael Klinger

- Phil Anderson – cyclist
- Cecil Austen – footballer
- Jack Billings – AFL footballer
- Philip Brady – 3AW radio personality
- MacFarlane Burnet – virologist and Nobel Laureate
- Cyril Callister – Food scientist and inventor of Vegemite
- Irene Crespin – Geologist
- Peter Curran – footballer
- Robert DiPierdomenico – footballer
- Cathy Freeman
- Josh Frydenberg – politician
- Andrew Gaff – AFL footballer-played junior football for Kew Comets
- Jack Gervasoni – footballer and Mayor of Kew
- Robin Gray – Premier of Tasmania
- Rupert Hamer – Premier of Victoria
- Terrence Hodson – Murdered Police Informant and Drug Dealer
- Walter Reginald Hume – businessman and inventor
- Barry Humphries – comedian, actor, author and satirist
- Brian V. Johnstone – theologian
- Graham Kinniburgh – organised crime figure
- Michael Klinger – cricketer
- Peter MacCallum – pathologist
- Jack Macrae – AFL footballer
- Glenn Maxwell – cricketer
- Luke McDonald – AFL footballer
- Peter McIntyre – architect
- Clement Roy Nichols – Scouting
- Gustav Nossal – scientist and Australian of the Year
- Celia Pacquola - comedian and actress
- Phil Ryan – footballer
- Jack Sinclair – AFL footballer-played junior football for Kew Comets
- Wendy Smith (politician) – politician
- Ross Stevenson – 3AW radio presenter
- David Syme – owner of The Age and associated newspapers
- Frank T. M. White – mineral science educator
- Roy Wright - AFL footballer
- Gough Whitlam – 21st Prime Minister of Australia born at 'Ngara' 46 Rowland St.
- John Wren – businessman

== See also ==
- City of Kew – Kew was previously within this former local government area.
- Electoral district of Kew - The state electoral division in which encompasses the suburb of Kew.
- Division of Kooyong- The federal electoral division in which encompasses the suburb of Kew.
- City of Boroondara - The local government council in which encompasses the suburb of Kew.
