= Project commissioning =

Process of assuring all systems and components are operational

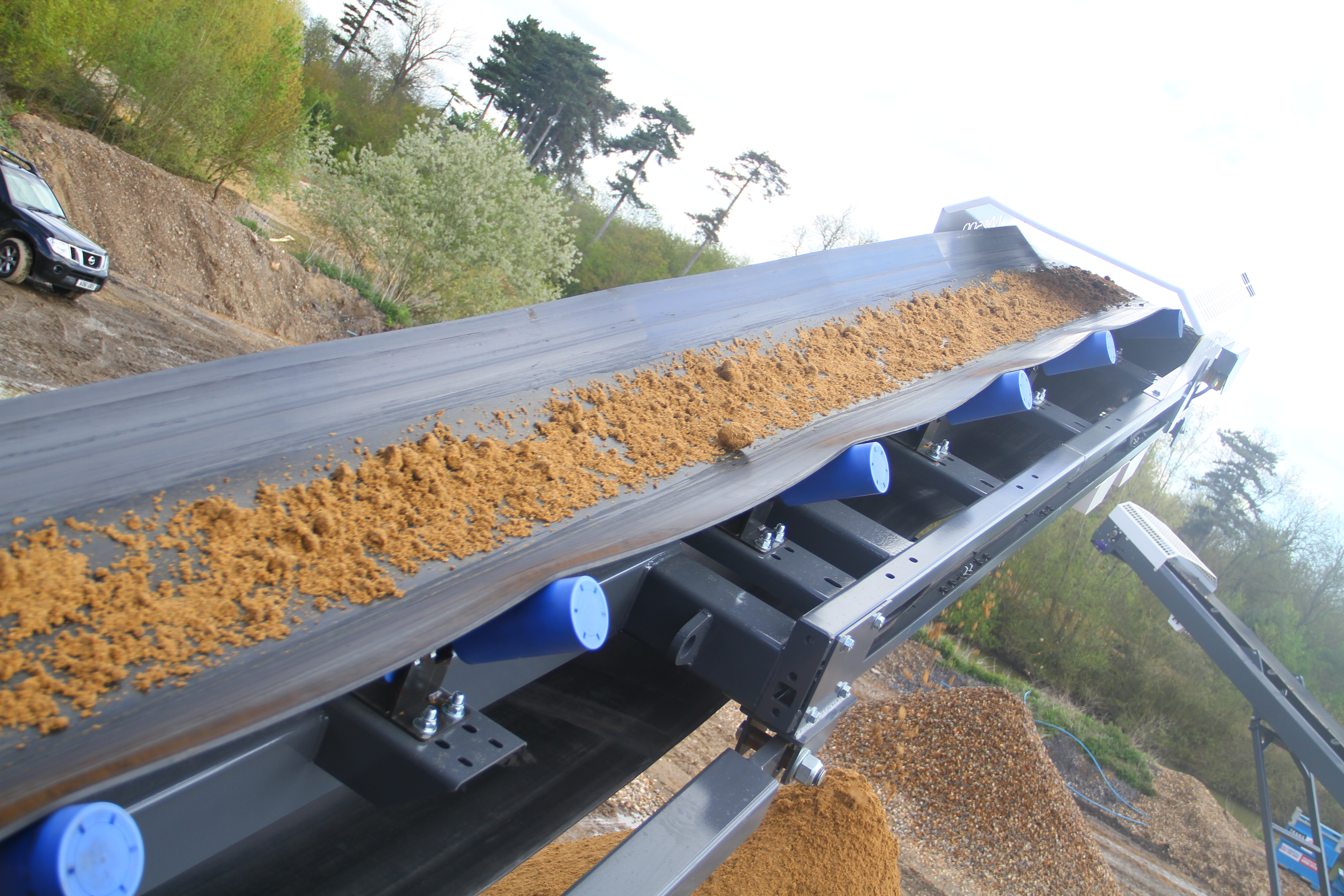
Commissioning of a conveyor where equipment is being tested to its maximum rating and capacity of operation.

Project commissioning is the process of ensuring that all systems and components of a building or industrial plant are designed, installed, tested, operated, and maintained according to the owner's or final client's operational requirements. A commissioning process may be applied not only to new projects but also to existing units and systems subject to expansion, renovation or revamping.

In practice, the commissioning process is the integrated application of a set of engineering techniques and procedures to check, inspect and test every operational component of the project: from individual functions (such as instruments and equipment) up to complex amalgamations (such as modules, subsystems and systems).

Commissioning activities, in the broader sense, are applicable to all phases of the project from the basic and detailed design, procurement, construction and assembly until the final handover of the unit to the owner, sometimes including an assisted operation phase.

== Objective and impact ==
The main objective of commissioning is to ensure the safe and orderly handover of the unit from the constructor to the owner, guaranteeing its operability in terms of performance, reliability, safety and information traceability. Additionally, when executed in a planned and effective way, commissioning normally represents an essential factor for the fulfillment of schedule, costs, safety and quality requirements of the project.

== Independent discipline ==
There is currently no formal education or university degree which addresses the training or certification of a Project Commissioning Engineer. Various short and online training courses are available, but they are designed for qualified engineers.

The commissioning of large civil and industrial projects is a complex and technical specialty, which is increasingly being considered a distinct engineering discipline, alongside traditional specialties, such as civil, naval, chemical, mechanical, electrical, electronic, instrumentation, automation, and telecom.

== Evolution ==
Structured commissioning methodologies emerged in the aerospace industry during the 1960s and 1970s, driven by the need to guarantee zero failures in critical systems such as airplanes, rockets, satellites, and Space Shuttles.

The spread to other sectors occurred primarily in the 1980s and 1990s, when nuclear, petrochemical, pharmaceutical, and energy generation industries adopted these principles. Oil and gas (especially offshore platforms) and transport infrastructure (railways, tunnels) began requiring detailed commissioning plans, inheriting the aerospace logic of phased validation and exhaustive documentation.

== Standardization ==
Several international standards bodies have established commissioning methodologies adapted to their respective sectors, most notably:

- ISO (International Organization for Standardization): ISO 9001 (quality management) incorporated commissioning principles into its PDCA cycle; ISO 20815 (Petroleum and natural gas industries — Production assurance and reliability management) and ISO 14001 (environmental aspects of commissioning).
- NORSOK (Norsk Sokkels Konkurranseposisjon): Published NORSOK Z-007: Mechanical Completion and Commissioning, which has become a key reference for the oil and gas sector.
- IEC (International Electrotechnical Commission): Developed IEC 62381, which defines guidelines for commissioning automation systems in industrial processes.
- ANSI/ASHRAE (American Society of Heating, Refrigerating and Air-Conditioning Engineers): Published Guideline 0 (The Commissioning Process) and Standard 202, which have become global references for commissioning in commercial and industrial buildings.
- ICCA (International Commissioning Certification Association): Developed specific methods for the construction and commissioning of building facilities.

== Commissioning management systems ==
For complex projects, the large volume and complexity of commissioning data, together with the need to guarantee adequate information traceability, normally leads to the use of powerful IT tools, known as commissioning management systems, to allow effective planning and monitoring of the commissioning activities.

In line with the broader digitalization movement across industry segments, these management systems have evolved from standalone punch-list control tools into integrated platforms that connect mechanical completion and commissioning data to other engineering disciplines and to overall project management throughout the entire asset lifecycle, from design and construction to operations and maintenance.

== See also ==
- Building commissioning – Process to ensure that all building systems perform according to the "Design Intent"
- Building enclosure commissioning – Quality-focused process to verify the energy performance of a facility, system or assembly
- Ship commissioning – Ceremony placing a ship in active service
