= Kew War Memorial, Melbourne =

Heritage-listed war memorial in Melbourne, Victoria, Australia

Kew War Memorial
- The war memorial, right, with the former post office in the background

- Location of the memorial in Greater Metropolitan Melbourne
- Interactive map of Kew War Memorial
- Location: Corner of High Street and Cotham Road, Kew, City of Boroondara, Melbourne, Victoria
- Coordinates: 37°48′24″S 145°01′52″E
- Designer: Harry Tompkins (in the Inter-war Classical style)
- Type: Rotunda
- Material: Granite; marble
- Width: 7.3 m (24 ft) (diameter)
- Height: 8 m (26 ft)
- Completion date: 1925; 101 years ago
- Opening date: 30 August 1925
- Dedicated to: World War I

Victorian Heritage Register
- Official name: Kew War Memorial
- Type: Registered place
- Designated: 13 May 2004
- Reference no.: VHR H2035
- Heritage overlay no.: HO68
- Category: Monuments and Memorials

The Kew War Memorial is a memorial dedicated to the lives lost during World War I located at the corner of High Street and Cotham Road, in Kew, in the City of Boroondara, in the inner eastern suburbs of Melbourne, in Victoria, Australia.

Built in 1925 on the traditional lands of the Wurundjeri people, the war memorial was added to the Victorian Heritage Register on 13 May 2004 in recognition of its architectural, historical, and social significance; and was also added to the non-statutory Victorian War Heritage Inventory.

The memorial is used as a gathering place for contemporary Anzac Day ceremonies.

== History ==
The Kew War Memorial is a memorial to local residents who served in World War I, sited on a triangular site in front of the former Kew Post Office at Kew Junction, on the corner of High Street and Cotham Road. Almost every Australian township erected a memorial after World War I to commemorate soldiers from the district. In June 1919, the Kew Municipal Council appointed a sub-committee to consider a suitable war memorial. Steps were taken to secure land in front of the Post Office for erection of the War Memorial. The mayor, Cr Harry W. Tompkins, an architect, submitted a design for the proposed memorial, and it was decided that an estimate of the cost be obtained. In August 1920, the land in front of the Post Office was transferred to the council.

It was decided to hold a competition for the design of the war nemorial. The estimated cost was not to be more than £3,500. Prizes offered were £50, £15 and £10, with the proviso that the council was not bound to accept any design. The results were announced in July 1921: the first prize was won by F. Bruce Kemp, and the second by Stephenson and Meldrum. Although Kemp was commissioned by the council to prepare working drawings, specifications and detail drawings suitable for calling tenders for construction, the Council later decided to reject the Kemp design and to construct the memorial according to the original design of the former mayor, H. W. Tompkins, who had since resigned from the council and offered to supervise the construction without fee. The Council funded the construction by the sale of some unused land.

The war memorial was inaugurated on 30 August 1925 before a crowd of approximately 5,000 people by the Governor of Victoria, The Earl of Stradbroke KCMG CB CVO CBE VD TD. During WWI, the Earl of Stradbroke had seen active service on the Western Front in the Egypt and Palestine campaign, as a Colonel in the UK Territorial Army.

== Description ==
The Kew War Memorial is a particularly fine example of a Inter-war Classical-style war memorial designed by notable Melbourne architect Harry Tompkins. Built in granite and marble as a circular temple, with a diameter of 7.3 metres (24 ft), supported on ionic columns, its design takes advantage of the site, allowing a clear view of all faces of the memorial. The frieze commemorates the theatres of war in which Kew residents served – the North Sea, Egypt, Belgium, Gallipoli, France, Palestine, Mesopotamia, and Salonica. In the centre of the temple is a square granite block with a central column. The western face of the block has the details of the purpose of the memorial and the occasion of its opening. On the other three faces, inscribed on the memorial are a total of 916 names of people from Kew, with 753 names of those who served, and 163 names of those servicemen and women who died in WWI.

The inscription reads:

City of Kew
to the
Honor (sic.) of the Living
and the Glory of the Dead
who Served in
the Great War
1914 — 1918

Unveiled by His Excellency
the Governor of Victoria
Earl of Stradbroke K.C.M.G.
30th August 1925
J. Lewis Carnegie Mayor
1924–25

A sculptured panel memorial, designed by George Allen, to those who served during World War II was initially installed in the Kew Town Hall in 1952, and was later incorporated into the development of the Kew Library in the civic centre in 1960, located at 47 Cotham Road, Kew.

== See also ==
- Architecture of Melbourne
- List of places on the Victorian Heritage Register in the City of Boroondara
