= Commissioning management systems =

IT tools for commissioning

Commissioning is the process of assuring that all systems and components of a building or industrial plant are designed, installed, tested, operated, and maintained according to the operational requirements of the owner or final client.

For large projects, this process usually comprises planning, execution, and control of hundreds of thousands of inspection and test activities on “commissionable objects”, such as instruments, equipment, skids, modules, circuits, loops, subsystems, and systems. In this case, the large volume and complexity of commissioning data, and the need to guarantee information traceability, normally require the use of powerful IT tools, known as commissioning management systems or completion management systems.

Software designed specifically for commissioning typically has two main parts:

1. A mobile field data collection component which allows for mobile data collection in both online and offline modes, and
2. An admin and reporting component, which is where a Cx manager would set up a project and view completion metrics and submitted commissioning forms.

Many systems also include a form template designer, where commissioning forms can be created and customized to accommodate a company's unique needs.

== Benefits when compared to paper-based systems ==
=== Data Access ===
In a paper-based system, completed commissioning forms are completed by hand and stored in various locations, or they may be scanned and stored electronically. In either case, the documentation may not be immediately accessible, and reporting may be difficult. With commissioning software, commissioning metrics data, and completed forms are available in near real-time. Permission-based controls and automated notifications also allows for distribution of commissioning completion data to specific stakeholders.

=== Data Accuracy and Completeness ===
In a paper-based system, incomplete paperwork, illegible handwriting, incorrect data entry, or missing or inaccurate information are common issues. With commissioning software that includes a mobile field data collection component, these common issues are reduced with the use of required fields, valid values lists, and validation controls for certain input fields.

=== Improved Turnover Efficiency and Speed ===
In a paper-based system, the turnover process can be time-consuming. Often, someone must review every system and every device, gather all the required documentation, put everything together, and submit it to the client. This process can take days. With commissioning software, this process can happen in minutes with a few clicks.

== Cost of Commissioning Software ==
Although these systems allow effective planning, management and monitoring of commissioning activities, as well as logging of all evidences necessary to the process they are not without a cost, as annual, monthly or per user license fees and can typically range from upwards of 10000 USD/year to 5 USD/day/user to unlimited use for 160 USD/month. The design of these systems can also vary greatly, from rich native applications that need to be installed on a computer to lightweight web-based systems that can be accessed from any web browser or mobile solutions that only require a smartphone to access the relevant information. Choosing one of these solutions is entirely dependent on the needs of the project and its users due to specific benefits and drawbacks from choosing either.

== See also ==
- Project commissioning
- New-construction building commissioning
