= Villa Alba Museum =

Heritage-listed historic house museum in Melbourne, Victoria, Australia

- Location of the historic house museum in Greater Metropolitan Melbourne

General information
- Status: Completed
- Type: House; Historic house museum
- Architectural style: Victorian Italianate
- Location: 44 Walmer Street, Kew, City of Boroondara, Melbourne, Victoria, Australia
- Coordinates: 37°48′18″S 145°00′40″E
- Completed: 1884; 142 years ago
- Owner: Villa Alba Museum Incorporated (since 2004)

Technical details
- Material: Bricks; slate; ashlar
- Floor count: 2; plus 3-storey tower

Website
- villaalbamuseum.org

Victorian Heritage Register
- Official name: Villa Alba
- Type: Registered place
- Designated: 20 August 1982
- Reference no.: VHR H0605
- Heritage overlay no.: HO134
- Category: Residential buildings (private)

Register of the National Estate
- Official name: Villa Alba
- Type: Defunct register
- Designated: 30 June 1992
- Reference no.: 14210

The Villa Alba Museum is a former house and now historic house museum, located at 44 Walmer Street in Kew, in the City of Boroondara, in the inner eastern suburbs of Melbourne, in Victoria, Australia.

Built between 1882 and 1884 on the traditional lands of the Wurundjeri people, the former house was added to the Victorian Heritage Register on 20 August 1982 in recognition of its architectural, historic, social, and aesthetic significance; and was also added to non-statutory lists by the Victorian branch of the National Trust on 13 February 1964 and the now defunct Register of the National Estate on 30 June 1992.

== History ==
It is believed that there was an earlier weatherboard house on the site which was built in 1863. Villa Alba was originally given to Anna Maria (nee McEvoy) on her marriage to William Greenlaw, the General Manager of the Colonial Bank of Australasia in Melbourne. The bank and Greenlaw both suffered during the crash of 1893.

Located opposite Studley Park adjacent the Yarra River, the river separated Villa Alba from the working-class terrace houses located in Abbotsford and Collingwood. An early photo showed that the villa was surrounded by the McEvoy's neighbouring larger property. The Paterson Brothers, a firm of interior decorators, then at the height of its reputation, was commissioned in 1883 and 1884 by the Greenlaws for the interior decoration of the house.

After William Greenlaw's death in 1895, Anna Maria sold the house contents and moved out in 1897. In 1901 the house was purchased by Anderson Dawson, a former Queensland premier, where he resided with his wife and four children. The house was leased, and later sold to the Fripp family who owned it until 1949 when it was sold to the [Royal] Women's Hospital who used it as a nurses' hostel and built the Henry Pride Convalescent Wing in Nolan Ave which opened in 1954. During this time the intricately decorated walls were covered in white paint to 'brighten up' the place. Fortunately the ceilings were not overpainted.

From 1973 the site was repurposed as the Henry Pride Geriatric Centre operated by the Mount Royal Hospital. The new Centre provided care for elderly patients in what was at first a 72-bed facility. The Geriatric Centre operated at Villa Alba until 1992. In 1999, after passing through the hands of several hospitals and becoming surplus to requirements, Villa Alba was sold to the Society of Jesus for the use of Xavier College. In a deal financed by the Victorian Department of Infrastructure in 2004 the museum obtained title to the house and original block. At the same time, Xavier College was given the right to lease the eastern part of the original land for passive use by the students of its Early Learning Centre.

== Description ==
Villa Alba is a two-storey home with rendered masonry walls and a slate roof. The house stands opposite Studley Park, overlooking the Yarra River. The house's Victorian Italianate architectural style and its tower are a landmark in the neighbourhood and it retains its original surroundings now surrounded by the school and neighbouring residences.

The house's interior is the most remarkable feature of Villa Alba. The interior was elaborately decorated by the Paterson Brothers, a company of three Scottish brothers who undertook many commissions to decorate wealthy homes in Melbourne during the economic boom following the gold rush and during the period known as 'Marvellous Melbourne'. The Paterson Brothers decorated Villa Alba along with other notable public buildings such as The Royal Exhibition Building, the Ballroom and Private Apartments at Government House, Melbourne Town Hall, the Parliamentary Library and the Prahran Public Library. Villa Alba was one of the firm's first domestic interiors and differs from the usual repetitive wallpapers of that era. The painted and stencilled decorative schemes in the ground floor hall, the dining room, the drawing room, the vestibule, the stair hall, the upper hall, principal bedroom and the boudoir are also individually of significance as outstanding examples of Victorian decoration.

== See also ==
- Architecture of Melbourne
- Boom style architecture
- List of museums in Melbourne
- List of places on the Victorian Heritage Register in the City of Boroondara
