= Barker railway station =

Former railway station in Victoria, Australia

Coordinates: 37°48′53″S 145°01′48″E

Barker
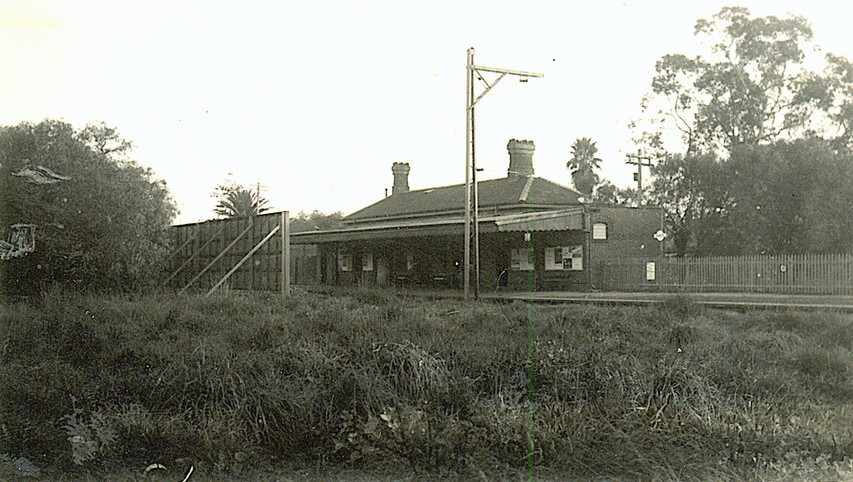
- Final passenger train at Barker railway station in 1952

General information
- Line: Kew
- Platforms: 1
- Tracks: 1

Other information
- Status: Closed

History
- Opened: 1887
- Closed: 1952

Services
Preceding station	Disused railways	Following station
Hawthorn	Kew line	Kew
	List of closed railway stations in Melbourne	
Location

Barker railway station was the only intermediate station on the Kew railway line in Melbourne, Australia. It was opened on 19 December 1887 and the last train was 1 August 1952. It closed fully with the line on 13 May 1957. The station was located between Barkers Road and Hawthorn Grove and has since been demolished.
