= Kew railway line =

Railway line in Melbourne, Australia

Kew

Overview
- Status: Dismantled line - Hawthorn to Kew Rail Trail
- Owner: Victorian Railways (VR) (1890–1957)
- Locale: Melbourne, Victoria, Australia
- Termini: Hawthorn; Kew
- Continues from: Alamein, Belgrave & Lilydale lines
- Connecting lines: Alamein, Belgrave & Lilydale lines
- Stations: 1 current station; 2 former stations

Service
- Type: Former Melbourne suburban service
- Operator: Victorian Railways (VR) (1890–1957)

History
- Opened: 10 August 1890
- Electrified: 19 December 1922
- Closed: 13 May 1957

Technical
- Line length: 2.123 km (1.319 mi)
- Number of tracks: Single track
- Track gauge: 1,600 mm (5 ft 3 in)
- Maximum incline: 1 in 40 (2.5%)

The Kew railway line was a former railway line in Melbourne, Australia. The line ran from Hawthorn to Kew. It was opened on 19 December 1887 and was officially closed on 13 May 1957. The last train ran on 18 August 1952 after years of decline.

== Description ==
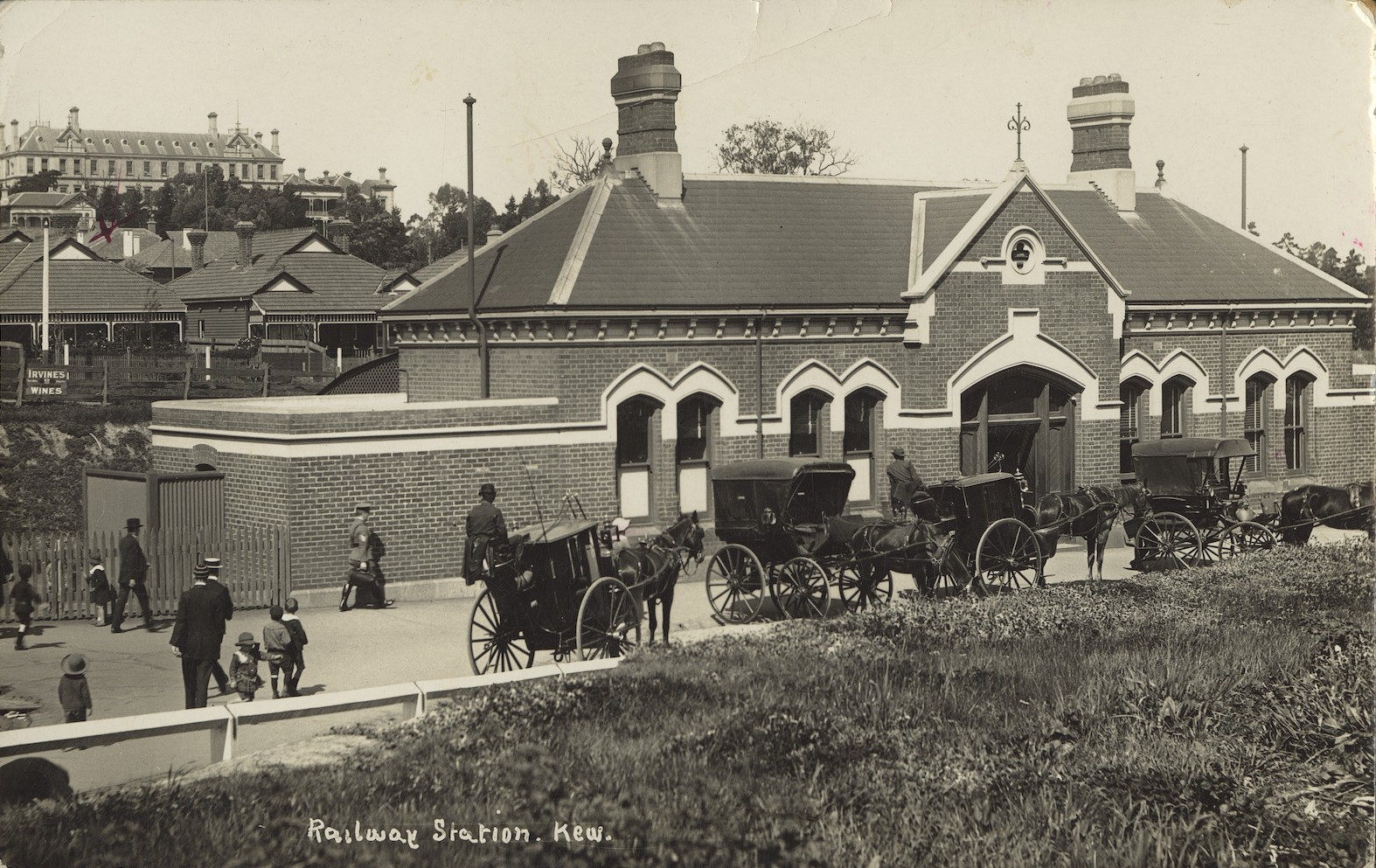
The street side of Kew station

The Kew line was a single track railway 1.5 miles (2.4 km) in length, departing from the western side of Hawthorn station and running parallel to the Lilydale line for several hundred metres, before curving to the north between the Grace Park and Glenferrie Oval. The line then entered a curved cutting, where three road bridges passed overhead for Chrystobel Crescent, Mary Street, and Kinkora Road. The cutting ended, and a level crossing was provided at Hawthorn Grove, before Barker station was reached. Barkers Road was then crossed, before the terminus of Kew station was reached in a cutting to the south of Wellington Street.

== History ==
The construction of a railway to Kew was pushed by the Kew Railway League, which urged that the line branch from the Lilydale line west of Hawthorn station, passing on an easy curve on the right side of Bulleen Road (now Church Street, Hawthorn and High Street South, Kew), through low-lying vacant land and old brick fields, to Kew and Prospect Hill. A tunnel under Burwood Road would have been required, but that was offset by no cuttings being required.

The line eventually decided upon by the Victorian Railways consisted a single track line 1.5 mi (2.4 km) in length, as described above, the construction contract being let to Noonan Brothers contractors for £18,086 ($36,172). Residents and members of the Kew Borough Council were unhappy with the course of the line, criticising it for not being the most direct route to Kew.

The first train left Princes Bridge station on 19 December 1887 at 5.40 am, and arrived at Kew to be greeted by the Station Master, a ticket seller, and the signalman. There was no ceremony on the opening, but once the last spike was driven a bottle of Irish whisky was produced from a portable hut near Barker station to celebrate the occasion.

The Age newspaper wrote after the opening of the line:

The gradients are distressing and the curves so sharp that the drivers were unable to see the semaphore arms until tell-tale arms were erected close to the ground. The junction with the Hawthorn – Glenferrie line is highly dangerous. It is possible, by the smallest neglect on the part of the signalman, for either a Glenferrie or Kew train to be cut in halves.

This contingency has caused the officers of the traffic office considerable anxiety, and strict orders have been given to the signalman at the junction box that once he has given 'line clear' for a train to run from Barkers Road, cross the main line and stop at Hawthorn, he must on no account alter his signals for a Glenferrie or Hawthorn train until the one from Kew has passed over the junction points. Under these circumstances the Railway Commissioners, faced by the terrible consequences of the Windsor accident, see the absolute necessity of bringing the line into Hawthorn station on a separate set of rails.And this for a line passing through unsettled park lands and terminating in a cutting, beyond which the line cannot be carried except at an extraordinary cost.

(Refer to Windsor Railway Station for further details on the "Windsor accident")

The alterations to the junction were completed by 1907 at the latest. Electrification of the line was commissioned on 17 December 1922.

In the 1920s a reader of the 'Argus' newspaper suggested that Kew trains run as shuttles from Hawthorn at peak hour to save congestion on the Lilydale line. At the time Kew trains from Flinders Street were usually empty, with only 5 people to a compartment, even in peak. At the time the line from Richmond towards Camberwell was only double tracked, unlike today.

On 18 August 1952 all regular passenger services on the line were withdrawn. The Hawthorn and Kew Railway (Dismantling) Act was passed on 9 December 1958.

Reasons for the decline of the Kew railway line are varied. A commonly held idea is that tramway competition led to a loss of passengers. The remoteness of the Kew railway station compared to the tramway which ran along High Street was almost certainly a factor. In his book Marc Fiddian states 'the abolition of through trains to Kew was probably the death knell of the branch line'.

== Services ==
On opening, a steam train shuttle service at 20–25-minute intervals, with through trains to the city provided in the peaks. After the electrification of the line, a 20-minute through service from the city was provided, and from 15 April 1923 trains were through-routed with the Fawkner line (today's Upfield line) at the same headway, with services increased to every 15 minutes from December 1924.

The decline in services on the line began on 24 November 1930 when non-peak through services to the city were ended. Off-peak the line operated as shuttle from Hawthorn, using a single ABM Swing Door motor car, every 15 minutes on weekdays and every 20 minutes on Sundays. This had a negative effect on patronage as people found changing trains inconvenient. On 29 November 1937 through services were eliminated during afternoon peak, with the train paths taken by services on the line to Ashburton (today's Alamein line). Bus substitution off peak begun on 5 June 1939 due to still falling patronage, with a local shuttle train operating from Hawthorn during peak hours and on Sunday mornings. By October 1939 the Sunday morning trains were also cut.

In 1941, there was only a peak-hour service to and from Kew by train, with 13 return trips, from 5.21 am to 9.13 am and 12 trips in the evening, from 3.35 pm to 7.04 pm. The remainder of services were provided by a road motor service at 15-minute intervals, via Denmark Street, Power Street and Burwood Roads. On 18 August 1952 all regular passenger services were withdrawn. The next year weekend Railway bus services were also withdrawn. In 1954 the weekday off-peak bus services were withdrawn, and in 1956, all remaining bus services were cancelled.

== Operation and safeworking ==
The line spent its operating life under the Train Staff and Ticket safeworking system, although the issuing of tickets was not permitted.

Once shuttle services on the line were introduced, operation of the line was simplified to cut down on the staff required.

The single ABM Swing Door motor car was stationed at Hawthorn. The guard of the train was required to collect the Train Staff for the line from the signaller at Hawthorn, and pass the Train Staff to the driver who maintained possession of it. On arrival at Hawthorn on the Up train, the guard was required to sight the Train Staff before departing in the other direction. After the last Up local train, the Train Staff had to be returned to the signalman. When a goods train was to be worked on the line, the yard porter was required to retrieve the Train Staff from the signaller and pass it to the driver. For through trains the Officer in Charge of Hawthorn station was responsible for passing the Train Staff to the driver

Trains arriving at Kew were required to pull up to end of the platform verandah. The crossover from 1 to 2 road was usually not in use by the 1950s, and a sleeve was placed across it to prevent its operation. The down home signal at Kew was usually set at proceed, unless required to be placed at stop to operate the interlocking frame.

== Stations ==
The Kew railway line had two stations. Both opened and closed with the line.

=== Station histories ===
Station	Opened	Closed	Age	Notes
Hawthorn	13 April 1861		165 years	
Barker	19 December 1887	13 May 1957	69 years	Formerly Barker's Road
Kew	19 December 1887	13 May 1957	69 years	

=== Barker ===
Barker station was located between the Barkers Road and Hawthorn Grove level crossings. The single platform was located on the western side of the line. In the 1940s the Hawthorn Grove gates were permanently closed to road traffic during train running times. Otherwise the interlocked hand gates at each end were opened and closed by station staff. The station also had a single semaphore signal for down trains.

=== Kew ===
Kew station was located to the south of Wellington Street in a cutting, 1.5 km (0.93 mi) beyond the Lilydale line. A single platform was provided on the western side of the line, with a run around loop provided, as well as a third dead end siding road with a dead end extension. A fourth road also existed behind the station platform, having a low platform for goods traffic provided on the western side, and staff lock on the main line connection. An interlocking frame was provided on the platform, for control of three fixed signal and the up end points for the yard and run around.

== Proposed extensions ==
There were proposals for extensions to the Kew railway line at various times. One of the first ideas was a Doncaster line in 1890, running across the Outer Circle line to Warrandyte, with a branch line running to Templestowe. In 1897 trial surveys were carried out for extensions from Kew to Healesville, Kew to Doncaster and Warrandyte (5 mi (8.0 km)), Kew to Templestowe (4.5 mi (7.2 km)), and Kew to the Outer Circle railway (1 mi (1.6 km)). This was followed in 1920 by another plan to extend the Kew line, this time to serve Doncaster itself. In the 1930s Victorian Railways Chief Commissioner Harold Clapp also drew up plans to extend the Kew line to Doncaster, running underground to the north of Kew Post Office, and then running on the surface with 5 new stations.

== Today ==
The site of Kew station is now occupied by the head office of VicRoads. The 'California Motor Inn' was built on the site of Barker station, but has since closed, and the site is awaiting redevelopment. Most of the railway formation between Wellington Street and Barkers Road is now used as a carpark and private road by VicRoads. The railway formation between Hawthorn Grove and Chrystobel Crescent is a linear parkland and shared path, and from Chrystobel Crescent to the main line is a carpark for Glenferrie Oval.
