= Hawthorn to Kew Rail Trail =

Rail trail in Melbourne, Australia

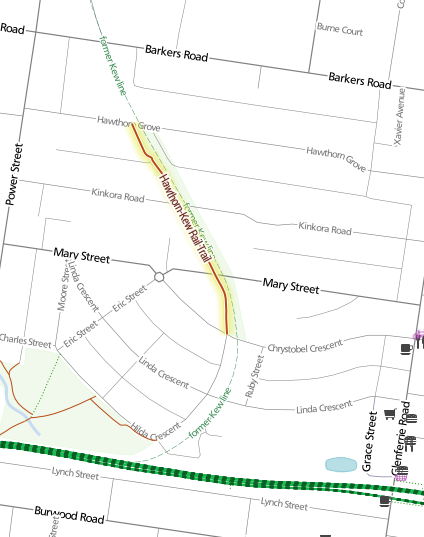
Map of the Hawthorn-Kew Rail Trail.

The Hawthorn to Kew Rail Trail is a short rail trail following part of the former Kew Branch Line in the inner suburbs of Melbourne, Victoria. The trail runs for less than a kilometre, through the L.E. Bray Reserve, between Hawthorn Grove and Chrystobel Crescent. A further short section of the alignment can be followed beside Hilda Crescent, through Grace Park where it previously joined the Belgrave/Lilydale line.
