= Kew railway station, Melbourne =

Former railway station in Victoria, Australia

Coordinates: 37°48′33″S 145°01′51″E

Kew
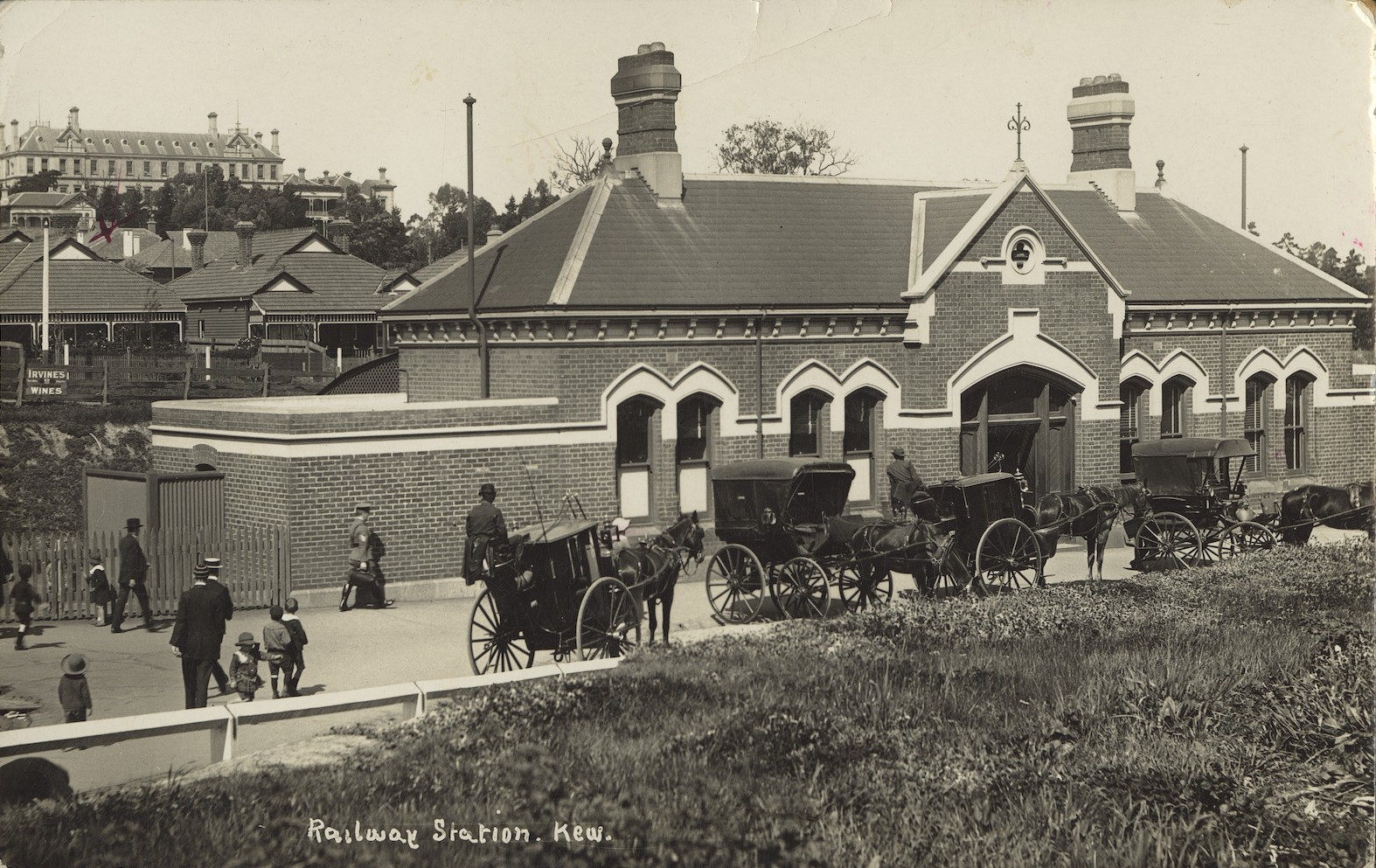

General information
- Line: Kew Line
- Platforms: 1
- Tracks: 1

Other information
- Status: Closed

History
- Opened: 1887
- Closed: 1952

Services
Preceding station	Disused railways	Following station
Barker	Kew line	Terminus
	List of closed railway stations in Melbourne	
Location

Kew railway station was the terminus of the Kew railway line, Australia. It was opened on 19 December 1887. The line ceased operations in August 1952, but the line and station were officially closed on 13 May 1957 and subsequently demolished. The station was located on Denmark Street, the headquarters of VicRoads now stands on the site.
