= Hawthorn railway station, Melbourne =

Railway station in Melbourne, Australia

Hawthorn
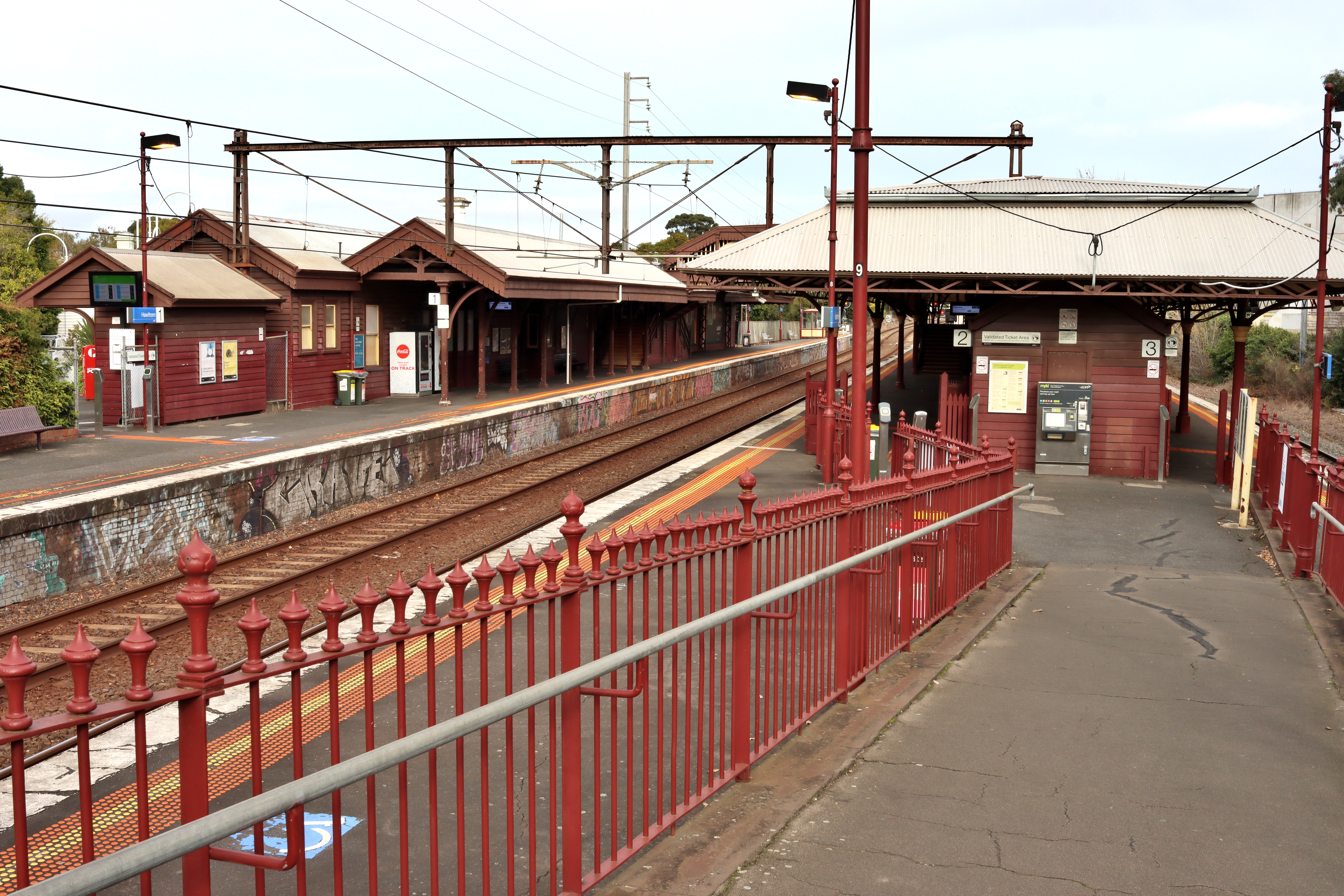
- Westbound view from Burwood Road entrance in June 2024

General information
- Location: Evansdale Road, Hawthorn, Victoria 3122; City of Boroondara; Australia
- Coordinates: 37°49′19″S 145°01′22″E
- System: PTV commuter rail station
- Owner: VicTrack
- Operator: Metro Trains
- Lines: Lilydale Belgrave; Alamein (Note: Peak only)
- Distance: 6.89 kilometres from Southern Cross
- Platforms: 3 (1 island, 1 side)
- Tracks: 3
- Connections: Bus; Tram

Construction
- Structure type: Ground
- Parking: 15
- Cycle facilities: Yes
- Accessible: No—steep ramp

Other information
- Status: Operational, unstaffed
- Station code: HAW
- Fare zone: Myki zone 1
- Website: Public Transport Victoria

History
- Opened: 13 April 1861; 165 years ago
- Electrified: December 1922 (1500 V DC overhead)

Passengers
- 2005–2006: 458,506
- 2006–2007: 508,851 ▲10.98%
- 2007–2008: 555,027 ▲9.07%
- 2008–2009: 574,879 ▲3.57%
- 2009–2010: 583,523 ▲1.5%
- 2010–2011: 621,015 ▲6.42%
- 2011–2012: 598,621 ▼3.6%
- 2012–2013: Not measured
- 2013–2014: 679,741 ▲13.55%
- 2014–2015: 669,738 ▼1.47%
- 2015–2016: 671,074 ▲0.19%
- 2016–2017: 698,570 ▲4.09%
- 2017–2018: 707,101 ▲1.22%
- 2018–2019: 709,100 ▲0.28%
- 2019–2020: 553,450 ▼21.95%
- 2020–2021: 243,600 ▼55.98%
- 2021–2022: 285,900 ▲17.36%
- 2022–2023: 469,400 ▲64.18%
- 2023–2024: 523,950 ▲11.62%
- 2024–2025: 531,400 ▲1.42%

Services
Preceding station	Metro Trains	Following station
Burnley towards Flinders Street	Lilydale line	Glenferrie towards Lilydale
Burnley towards Flinders Street	Belgrave line	Glenferrie towards Belgrave
Burnley towards Flinders Street	Alamein line Peak only	Glenferrie towards Alamein

Former services
Junction	Kew branch	Barker
	List of closed railway stations in Melbourne	

Victorian Heritage Register
- Official name: Hawthorn Railway Station Complex
- Type: Registered Place
- Designated: 20 August 1982
- Reference no.: H1566
- Heritage overlay no.: HO042
- Category: Transport – Rail
Track layout
Location

Hawthorn is a railway station operated by Metro Trains Melbourne on the Alamein, Belgrave and Lilydale lines, which are part of the Melbourne rail network. It serves the eastern suburb of the same name, in Melbourne, Victoria, Australia.

Hawthorn opened on 13 April 1861 and was added to the Victorian Heritage Register on 20 August 1982 in recognition of its historical significance.

== History ==
Hawthorn station was opened when the railway line from Pic-nic was extended across the Yarra River. When it opened, Hawthorn was a terminus, with a single platform, which is the current Platform 1. In 1882, after the line was extended to Camberwell, an additional platform was constructed. In 1890, an island platform was provided to accommodate the newly opened branch line to Kew, using a canopy from the original Flinders Street station.

In 1963, a third track was provided between Hawthorn and Camberwell, which was extended across the Yarra River to Burnley in 1972. The third track allows bi-directional running on the middle track for express services during peak hour. A signal box at the station was abolished in that same year.

In late 1972, the 12:01 am goods train to Hawthorn, and the 2:55 am goods train to Box Hill, previously scheduled to operate on Mondays only, were both cancelled, and the Tuesday-Friday schedule of the 12:01 am Melbourne Yard to Box Hill goods train was expanded to run on Mondays as well, serving Burnley, Hawthorn, Camberwell and Box Hill. That change was made because the ability to reverse trains at Hawthorn had been removed, meaning that goods trains could no longer run from the city to Hawthorn only.

In 1973, bulk briquette handling facilities were abolished at the station and, by 1977, the goods yard had been closed altogether, with the siding and connection to the yard abolished in 1978.

By the mid 1980s, the station had not been well maintained for many years and was in a dilapidated state. In 1984, the Victorian State Government, with the Metropolitan Transit Authority (The Met), approved a $300,000 face-lift of the station, which included repainting, the re-panelling of the waiting room, the re-cladding of the canopies, and landscaping. The refurbishment was completed by May 1986.

== Platforms and services ==
Hawthorn has one island platform and one side platform, and is served by Lilydale, Belgrave and Alamein line trains.

Hawthorn platform arrangement
Platform	Line	Destination	Via	Service Type	Notes	Source
1	Alamein line Belgrave line Lilydale line	Flinders Street	City Loop	All stations and limited express services	See City Loop for operating patterns	
2	Belgrave line Lilydale line	Lilydale or Belgrave		All stations	Weekends only.	
3	Alamein line Lilydale line	Alamein, Blackburn, Ringwood or Lilydale		All stations and limited express services	Weekdays only.	

== Transport links ==
Kinetic Melbourne operates one bus route via Hawthorn station, under contract to Public Transport Victoria:

- 609 : to Fairfield

Yarra Trams operates one route via Hawthorn station:

- : Central Pier Docklands – Vermont South

== Gallery ==
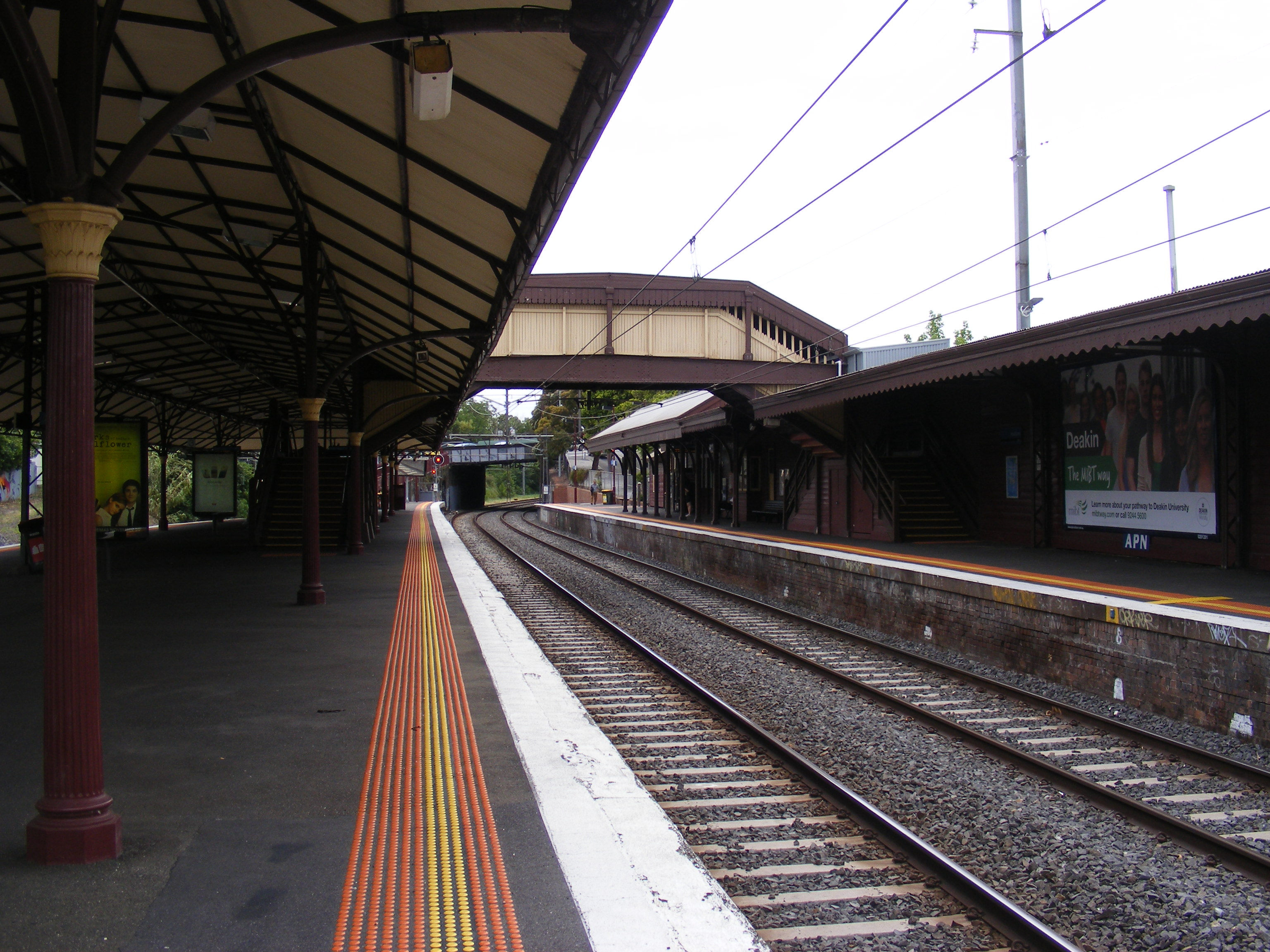
Eastbound view from Platform 2, November 2012

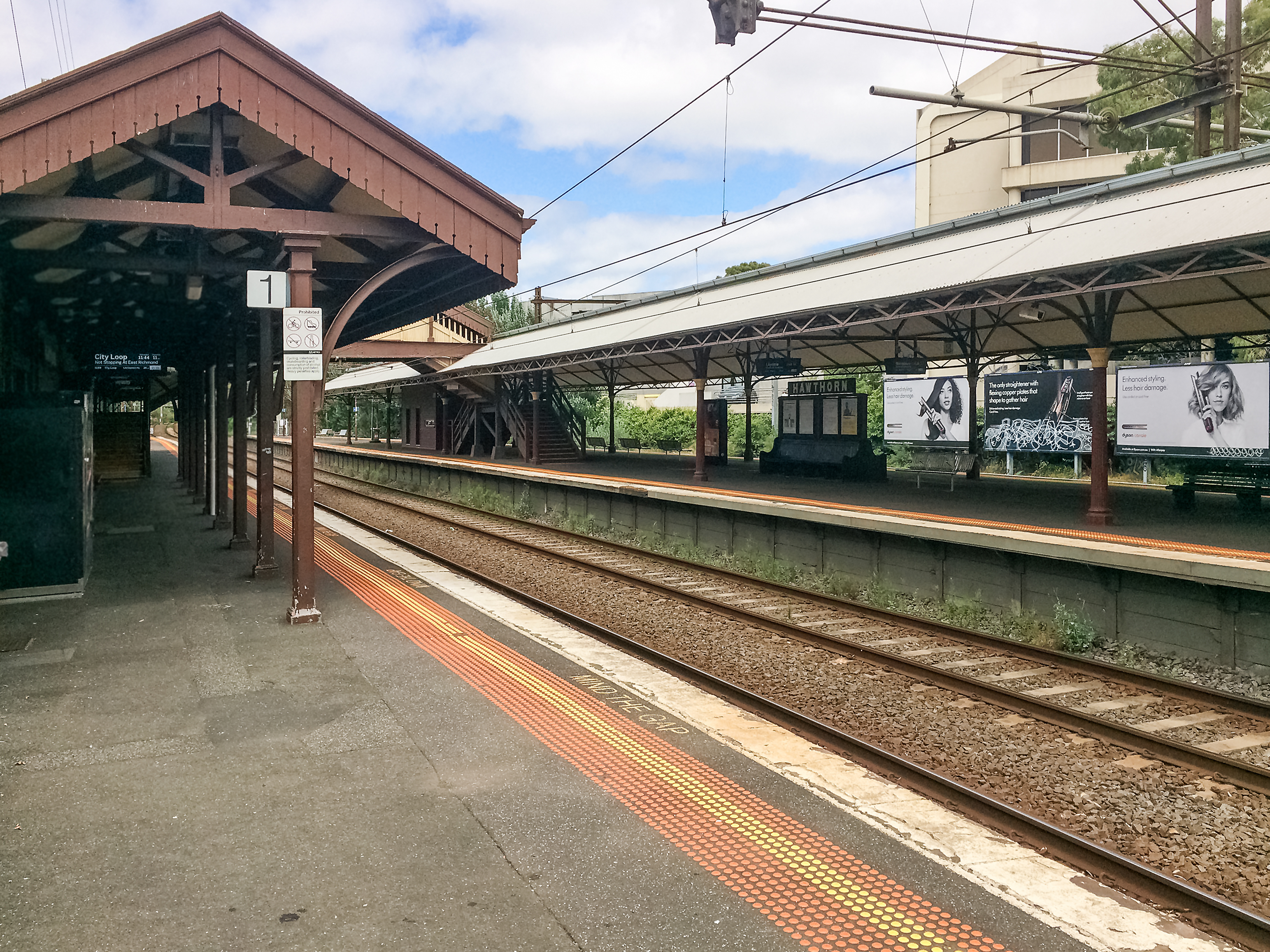
Westbound view from Platform 1, January 2021

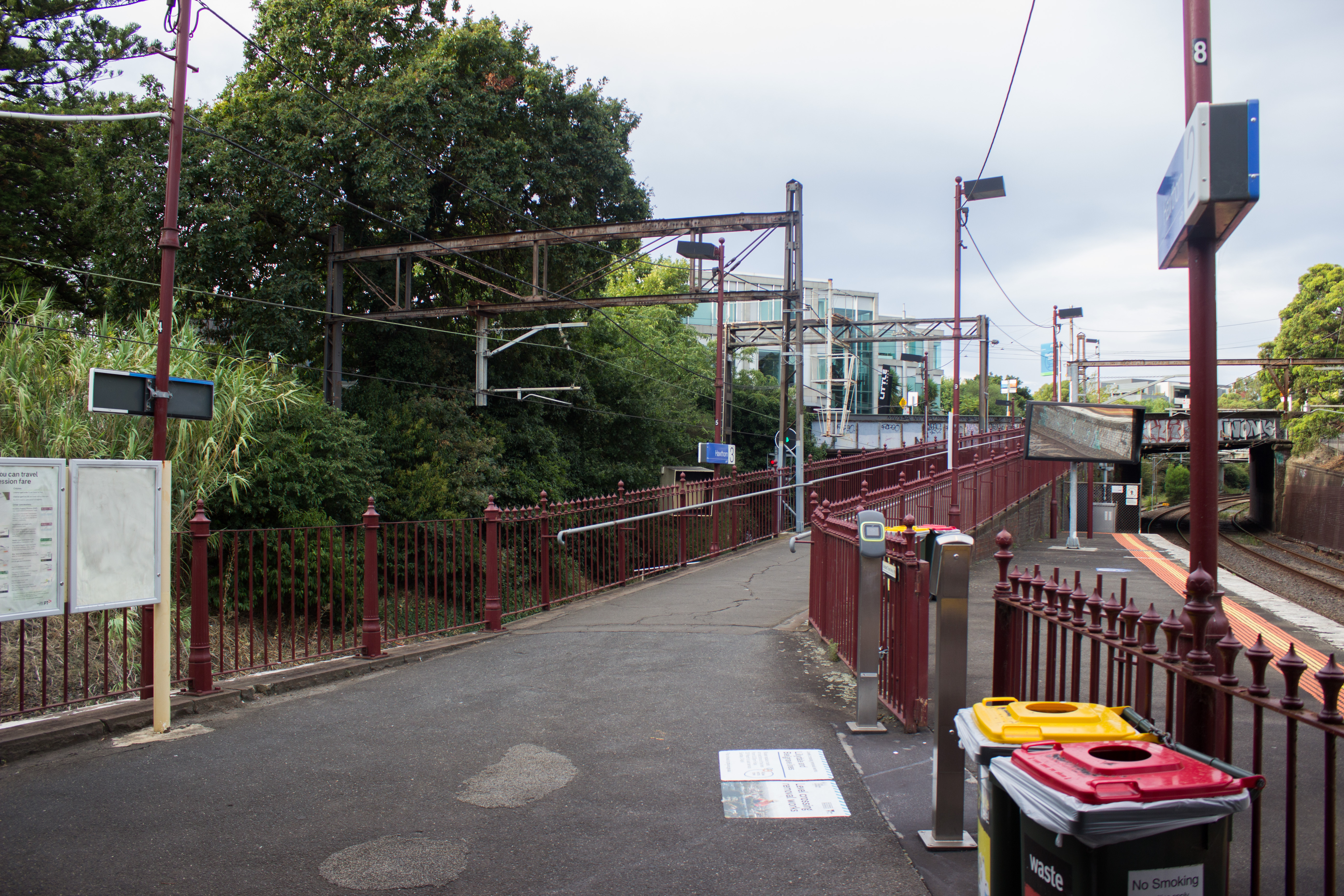
Ramp from Burwood Road to island platform, February 2022

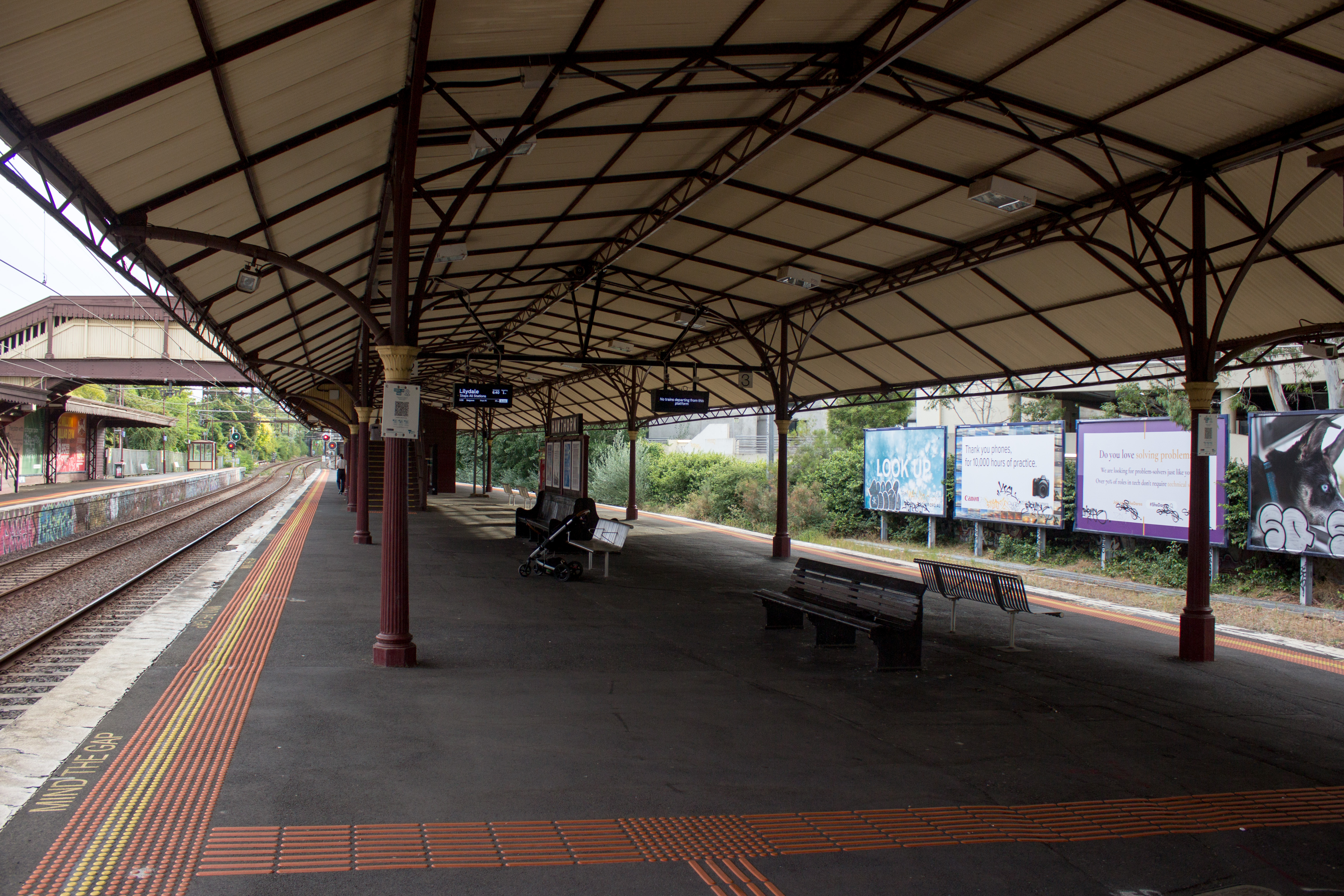
View of the heritage-listed canopy over Platforms 2 and 3, February 2022
