= ICCA =

ICCA may refer to:

== Organizations ==
- Indigenous and Community Conserved Area, areas in which there are close associations between indigenous people or a local community and a specific territory or natural resources
- International Congress and Convention Association, organization in the meetings industry
- International Correspondence Chess Association, now the International Correspondence Chess Federation
- International Council of Chemical Associations
- Inter-parliamentary Coalition for Combating Antisemitism, an international coalition

== Other uses ==
- The International Conference on Clifford Algebras and Their Applications in Mathematical Physics, a triennial conference series in Clifford Algebras
- International Championship of Collegiate A Cappella, an international competition for student-run and -directed a cappella singing groups
- ICGA Journal, formerly ICCA Journal
