= Commissioning (construction) =

Process to ensure that all building systems perform according to the "Design Intent"

In construction, commissioning or commissioning process (often abbreviated Cx) is an integrated, systematic process to ensure that all building systems perform interactively according to the design intent through documented verification. The commissioning process establishes and documents the Owner's Project Requirements (OPR) criteria for system function, performance expectations, maintainability; verify and document compliance with these criteria throughout all phases of the project (design, manufacturing, installation, construction, startup, testing, and operations). Commissioning procedures require a collaborative team effort and 'should' begin during the pre-design or planning phase of the project, through the design and construction phases, initial occupancy phase, training of operations and maintenance (O&M) staff, and into occupancy (for warranty and future re-commissioning).

== History ==
Historically, commissioning as referenced in building design and construction, referred to the process by which the heating, ventilation, and air conditioning (HVAC) systems of a building were tested and balanced according to established standards prior to the Owner's acceptance. HVAC commissioning, historically, didn't include other, interactive, supporting, or supplemental building systems that did not directly affect the performance of the HVAC systems.

In 2005, the U.S. General Services Administration (GSA) published The Building Commissioning Guide. The guide provides a process for including building commissioning in the planning, design, construction and post-construction phases of a project.

Through energy and water conservation, occupant comfort, life-safety, systems criticality, and technology improvements of building systems became more in demand, and expanded the Owner's performance and technical capability expectation. The need to improve, integrate, and commission other (and more) systems expanded the scope of Building Commissioning. In modern facilities, buildings, and systems many of the systems are integrated (directly or indirectly) in operation, affect, need for proper operation, function, control, and sequencing. This can become very complex, and provide many points of sub-optimal operation, or failure, with all the many systems requiring, or affecting, interaction of each other.

For example, power sources (utility, generation, battery/cell) control and monitoring, air movement control, smoke control, fire suppression, fire alarm, security door egress/evacuation control, elevator control, space containment/infiltration, staging and sequencing of every interacting system, its sub-system, equipment, and components each operating and interacting correctly in every operating Mode (normal, startup, shutdown, maintenance, economy, emergency, etc.).

This list can go well beyond this example, even in the most basic, typical, facility today. As more building systems are integrated, a deficiency in one component can result in sub-optimal operation and performance among other components and systems. Through system testing and "integrated systems testing" (IST) verification of all interrelationships, effects, modes of operation, and performance can be verified and documented to comply with the 'Owner's Project Requirements' and Architect/Engineers documented 'Design Intent' performance.

Thus, whole building commissioning (or total building commissioning) is the accepted normal/standard, certainly for government and critical facility owners, but also for conservation and efficiencies to provide a fully verified operational facility. partial building commissioning (commissioning only specific equipment, functions, systems) is also still utilized, but the interrelations of many automated systems, as designed, today branch and spider throughout many other systems within even basic buildings. The Owners Project Requirements and the architect's/engineers' design should clearly identify the scope and expectations of commissioning.

== Definition ==
The following descriptions of the different types of commissioning comes from California Commissioning Collaborative (CCC), Guide for New Buildings (2006).

"The term commissioning comes from shipbuilding. A commissioned ship is one deemed ready for service. Before being awarded this title, however, a ship must pass several milestones. Equipment is installed and tested, problems are identified and corrected, and the prospective crew is extensively trained. A commissioned ship is one whose materials, systems, and staff have successfully completed a thorough quality assurance process.

Building commissioning takes the same approach to new buildings. When a building is initially commissioned it undergoes an intensive quality assurance process that begins during design and continues through construction, occupancy, and operations. Commissioning ensures that the new building operates initially as the owner intended and that building staff are prepared to operate and maintain its systems and equipment.

Retro-commissioning is the application of the commissioning process to existing buildings. Retro-commissioning is a process that seeks to improve how building equipment and systems function together. Depending on the age of the building, retro-commissioning can often resolve problems that occurred during design or construction, or address problems that have developed throughout the building's life. In all, retro-commissioning improves a building's operations and maintenance (O&M) procedures to enhance overall building performance.

Re-Commissioning is another type of commissioning that occurs when a building that has already been commissioned undergoes another commissioning process. The decision to recommission may be triggered by a change in building use or ownership, the onset of operational problems, or some other need. Ideally, a plan for recommissioning is established as part of a new building's original commissioning process or an existing building's retro-commissioning process."

== In practice ==
While the practice of building commissioning is still fairly new (40 years) in the building construction industry, it has become more (not completely) industry standard practice as building owners require higher expectations of performance and return of investment. The commissioning process inherently, and through design, improves the quality of the project from initial planning/design through construction and occupancy.

Building commissioning is typically led by a recognized professional experienced in commissioning who oversees, leads, and serves as the ultimately responsible individual for the management of the process/program and deliverable in the representation of, or contracted to the owner/developer. Typically, they are identified as the commissioning provider (CxP). The CxP may be a member Of the owner, engineer, construction/project manager, contractor, or independent third party. The industry standard most recognized and recommended arrangement is for the CxP to be an Independent Third Party Commissioning Provider (also acronym CxP) contracted directly to the owner. This facilitates a more unbiased performance in the representation of the owner. The CxP may have subordinates/peers who participate directly in his/her oversight and commissioning execution/documentation team. This team is typically identified as the commissioning provider's team.

There are many variations to this as well. In many cases and ideally, there is an ongoing building enhancing and commissioning program and team for the life of the building. Building commissioning is a quality-focused process necessary for both non-complex and complex modern construction projects. The breadth of the industry, services, benefits, requirements, documentation, etc. is endless. Although the basic Cx process, phases, and steps are fairly standard, the variations of project scopes, expectations, special designs; individual intricacies of every differing design, manufacture, interaction; use of every differing design, assembly, component, power, control system, control method, equipment, and system available to the designer, and manufacturers; make every single project's systems and commissioning program complex and original.

== Service method ==
While the service method can vary from owner to owner and project to project, the basic formula for a successful building commissioning process involves a synergy team from pre-design to develop the owner's project requirements (OPR), commissioning scope, and plan including benchmarks for success, review of design documents and checklists for achieving the OPR, development of checklists and verifying a sample of construction checklists and submittals, developing training needs and evaluating training delivered by the contractors, witnessing and verifying construction phase tests, and periodic site observations during the construction phase, and performing commissioning functional testing as the project nears completion.

== Commissioning provider (CxP) ==
The commissioning provider (CxP) is generally (and preferably) contracted directly to the building owner to ensure unbiased performance of the CxP. The CxP may be a subcontractor (or employee) of the building owner, architect, or design engineer.

It is recommended that the CxP be contracted early in the project planning stages included in pre-design and design charrettes, and maintained throughout the design, construction, and final acceptance of the project at a minimum. Having the CxP on the team early provides opportunity to identify possible operation, installation, testing, and performance issues long before they become a construction issue. The CxP works closely with the owner's representative, building/facility operating engineer, architect, design engineer, general contractor, and all trade subcontractors. The CxP typically is responsible for leading and managing the project commissioning process (design and/or construction) and works closely with the design, construction, and operation teams in a co-operative work environment that focuses on teamwork throughout the building's design, construction, and post construction.

A CxP's ability to add value to a project is rooted in their ability to create positive working relationships with all parties involved and not pointing fingers when issues arise. It is important that the CxP clearly identifies the communication processes/streams, the project goals and expectations (from the OPR), and the team member responsibilities. A CxP has to be able to give open constructive criticism while also being able to listen attentively. The CxP's primary goal is to provide a completed and properly operating product to the building owner and occupant/user.

The CxP's work and performance of service is equally or primarily in the background performing design, submittal, O&M Manual reviews and development of testing and commissioning processes for the project, as well as documenting the commissioning efforts. The CxP attends design and construction meetings, performs site construction observations, observes factory equipment testing, directs and observes functional performance testing of systems and equipment. The CxP typically does not actually perform the hands-on testing, as these are actually performed by the manufacturer, vendor, or trade contractors, and directed and observed by the CxP utilizing testing procedures and expected performance outcome previously identified by the CxP during the commissioning document development process.

The CxP typically prepares a commissioning specification and commissioning plan during the project design phase. The design engineer also may develop the commissioning specification (and rarely the commissioning plan) in situations where the CxP has not been so contracted, or brought into the design team during the design process. The commissioning plan is a live document that outlines the commissioning processes and expectation based on the Owner's OPR, the design engineer's basis of design (BOD) and the project construction document (drawings and specifications). The commissioning plan is modified as the commissioning process progresses throughout the design, construction, and final acceptance of the facility. The functional performance test procedures are typically developed by the CxP with assistance of the trade contractors, vendors, and manufacturers based on the design engineer's contract documents. These same parties and the design engineer, and owner's representative (typically the facility operating engineer) review the functional performance test procedures and expected outcomes prior to testing. The systems, equipment, items, processes, modes, and sequences of operations to be tested by the CxP (contractors or others) should be detailed and identified in the design engineer's construction documents (drawings and specifications), the construction request for proposal (RFP), the contractors' bid submission, the commissioning specifications, the commissioning plan, and the contractor's submittals. Of utmost importance, often neglected by contractors, are the equipment/systems installation and operations manuals (IOM or IO&M) specific to the project (not generic). The IOM's along with complete, and very detailed, sequence of operations (SOO) and control drawings/documents submittal "specific to the project" (not generic) are of utmost importance to the CxP to perform the review and develop proper testing procedures. Timely delivery of these documents to the CxP is important to facilitate the CxP ample time to review, develop test, obtain reviews, and implement changes prior to scheduling of any testing.

To provide any benefit, the facility, systems, and equipment must be thoroughly designed, submitted to, and approved by a responsible, thorough, professional architectural and engineering design team to function correctly. The design team incorporates the documented owner's program of requirements (OPR) which identifies the owner's systems, equipment, materials, control, and performance expectations. The design team identifies and documents the project basis of design (BOD) which specifically identifies the OPR items, how each was implemented in the design (or modified), and the final design basis for systems, equipment, materials, control, and performance expectations.

The fast-track nature of the design and construction process (experience in 2011) often leads to missed planning, design, and even construction items. Items missed during the design and construction process can often be identified by the CxP during development of the functional and performance test procedures or during functional and performance tests.

The commissioning team, led by the CxP, has a primary objective of verifying proper installation, operation, and performance based on the project design (BOD) and the OPR. The commissioning of the facility, systems, and / or equipment provides verification, identifies issues and discrepancies, and if designed and constructed properly, ultimately enhances the facility total quality, control, performance, and efficiency which in turn provides increased sustainability.

== Building Automation Systems (BAS) ==
Building management systems (BMS) or building automation systems (BAS) provide control of the building systems. These typically include heating, ventilating, air-conditioning and refrigeration (HVAC/R), electrical power, lighting, fire suppression and alarm, and security systems, etc. Building controls also have the ability to monitor and control systems to improve performance, conserve energy, conserve water, and control lighting. The greater control provides the ability to improve a buildings performance, environmental impact, and the user / occupant's environment. Direct digital controls (DDC) with real time monitoring and history provide the ability to acquire system data real time or with trend-logging, or trending, (over a predetermined period of time) to observe performance, issues / troubles, and identify possible improvements to operations and maintenance.

Building systems and equipment (HVAC, electrical, etc.) operate via the control systems (BAS, BMS, and similar) based on a designed sequence of operations (SOO) typically developed by the design engineer (specification) and modified during the submittal process by the trade contractors (and reviewed and approved by the design engineer). This SOO is also reviewed by the CxP who utilizes the SOO to develop the functional performance test procedures. The functional performance test procedures are typically developed by the CxP with assistance of the trade contractors, vendors, and manufacturers, reviewed by same, and the design engineer. The systems, equipment, items, processes, modes, and sequences of operations to be tested by the CxP (contractors or others) should be detailed and identified in the design engineer's construction documents (drawings and specifications), the construction request for proposal (RFP), the contractors' bid submission, and the commissioning specifications and commissioning plan. The commissioning specification and commissioning plan are typically developed by the CxP during the design phase of the project.

The CxP works closely with the controls contractor to verify the control programming and identifies corrective issues during reviews and the functional performance testing. By performing the functional performance testing it is often, if not always, found where there are deficiencies in the systems or control and identifies items for improvement. Each and every point and sequence is typically not required to be tested by the CxP. The contractors typically hold the responsibility of testing and verifying each and every point and sequence, and the CxP performs a test of a sample of the items after the contractors have tested, repaired and verified. Re-testing of the same, or another sampling, by the CxP is often required to re-verify deficiencies identified during the initial testing.

== System degradation ==
It is estimated by Texas A&M researchers that as much as 20% of the energy used in an average commercial building is waste associated with poorly operated systems.

Buildings systems under-perform for several reasons:

1. They were never properly configured
2. The design did not account for all sources of building efficiency
3. The building, or equipment, is not properly maintained
4. The use of the building has changed over time

== Types of building commissioning ==
There are different types of building comiisioning, including:

- New Construction Building Commissioning (Cx) (Note: cx.lbl.gov had "Commissioning Process Overview" and "Retro-Commissioning Process Overview" diagrams of very basic activities included in each phase of the Commissioning processes.)
- Existing Building Commissioning: (Note: cx.lbl.gov had "Commissioning Process Overview" and "Retro-Commissioning Process Overview" diagrams of very basic activities included in each phase of the Commissioning processes.)
  - Retro-Commissioning (RCx): Retro-commissioning is commissioning of existing building systems that may not have been commissioned during initial construction. (Note: cx.lbl.gov had "Commissioning Process Overview" and "Retro-Commissioning Process Overview" diagrams of very basic activities included in each phase of the Commissioning processes.)
  - Re-Commissioning (ReCx): Recommissioning is the process of testing and adjusting systems in an existing buildings which have previously been commissioned. (Note: cx.lbl.gov had "Commissioning Process Overview" and "Retro-Commissioning Process Overview" diagrams of very basic activities included in each phase of the Commissioning processes.)
  - Ongoing Building Commissioning (OCx) (also called Continuous Commissioning or Monitoring-Based Commissioning (MBCx)): Ongoing Commissioning involves using monitoring systems like BAS or Fault Detection and Diagnostics (FDD) to routinely recommission building systems to ensure they're always operating at their most efficient state. (Note: cx.lbl.gov had "Commissioning Process Overview" and "Retro-Commissioning Process Overview" diagrams of very basic activities included in each phase of the Commissioning processes.)

== Common commissioned building systems ==
It is common to include HVAC and BAS systems in the commissioning process. Often the installations for fire safety, lighting controls, plumbing, electrical distribution, and of more recent years, the building enclosure, may also be included within the scope of the commissioning process.

== Commissioning costs and savings ==
The payback time for the commissioning process is based on many factors including saved/minimized energy usage, better design and fewer errors.

"Building Commissioning Costs and Savings Across Three Decades and 1,500 North American Buildings" states that the simple payback time for commissioning on new construction projects is 4.2 years.

A Danish Master Thesis made over two identical construction projects (shopping centers) where commissioning was used on one the construction projects showed, that the construction project with commissioning used 42% less electrical energy in the operation phase.

== See also ==
- Project commissioning – Process of assuring all systems and components are operational
- Commissioning management systems – IT tools for commissioning
