= Colonial Bank of Australasia =

Former banking company in Victoria, Australia

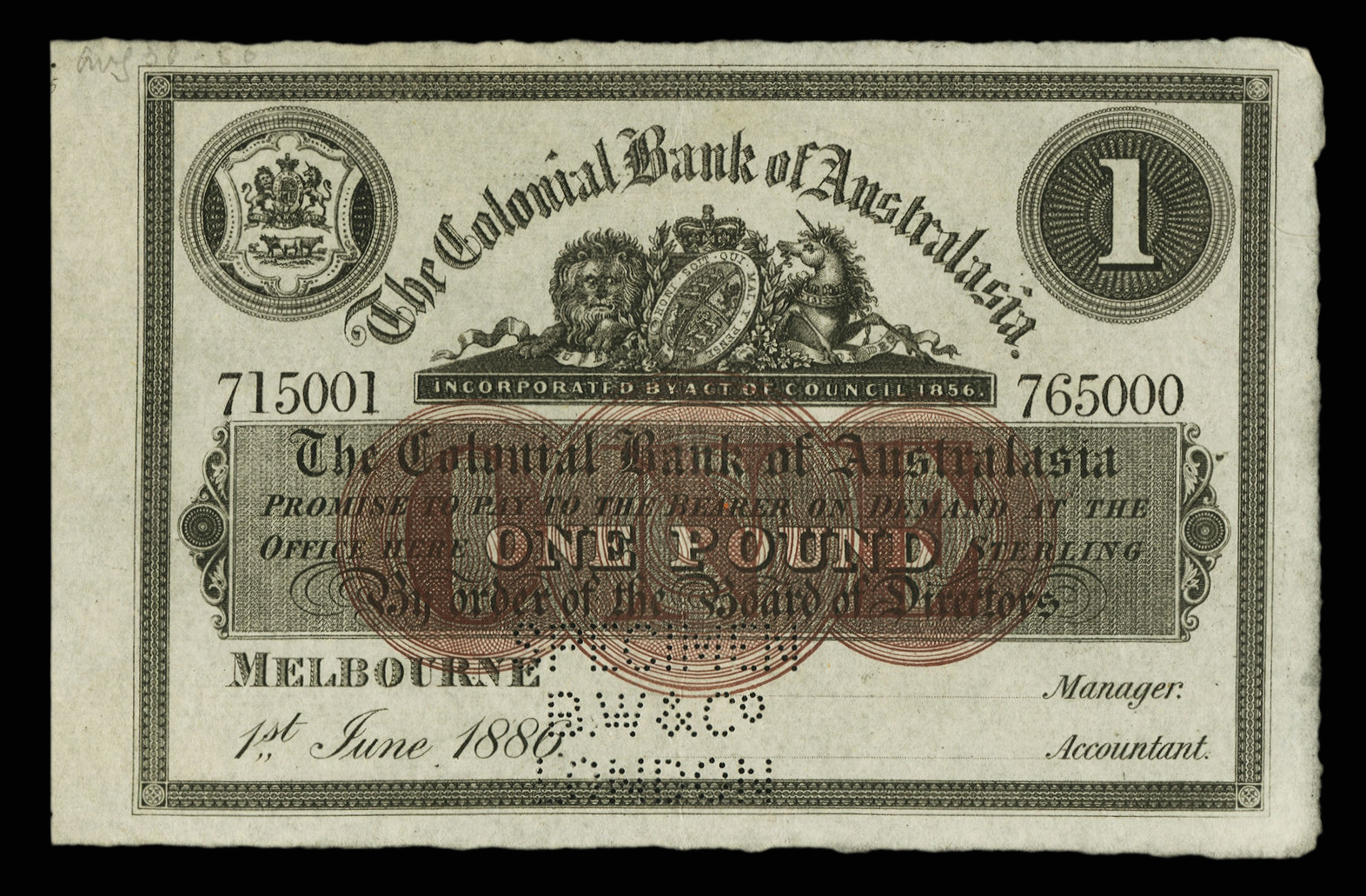
One pound note dated 1 June 1886

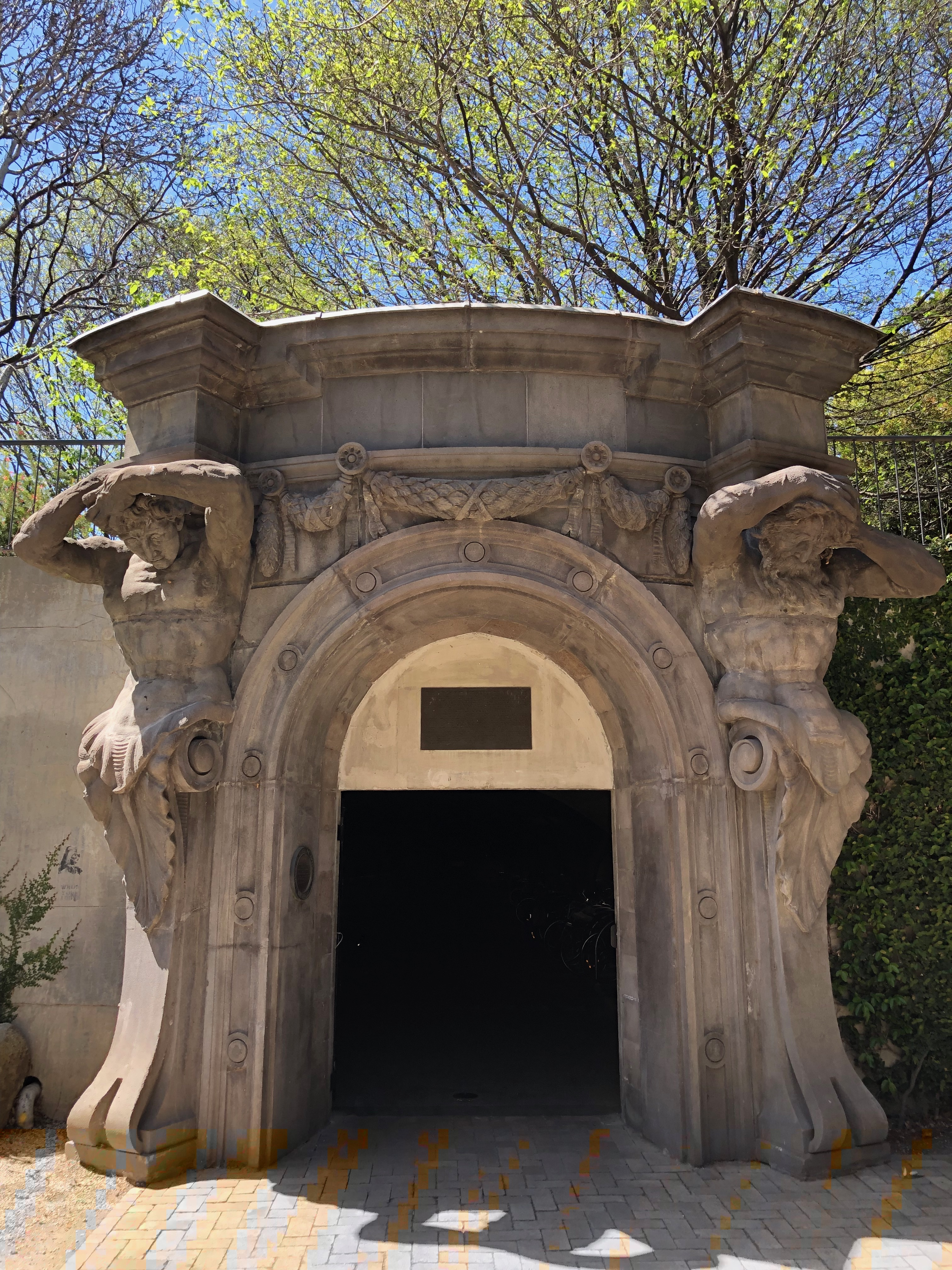
Preserved main entrance from the bank's former headquarters

The Colonial Bank of Australasia was a bank operating primarily in the Australian colony and then state of Victoria from 1856 to 1918.

It commenced operation on 14 April 1856, following its incorporation by the Parliament of Victoria through the Colonial Bank of Australasia Act 1856 (19 Vict.). The board's first governor was John O'Shanassy, who would become Premier of Victoria the next year. The new bank had already won a lawsuit filed against it by the Bank of Australasia, which had alleged that the new bank had infringed upon its rights. It described itself as having been established on the "Scottish principle", with limited liability for shareholders related to having been incorporated by Parliament.

The bank's first headquarters were located in the former Imperial Hotel on the corner of Elizabeth and Little Collins streets, Melbourne. It was replaced with a grand new headquarters on the same site in 1880–82 to a design of the architectural firm Smith and Johnson, the new building opening in April 1882.

In 1893, the bank had 69 branches across the state of Victoria, and was represented interstate and overseas through agencies with a number of other banks. It was one of the banks to suspend payments during the banking crisis of 1893 later that year.

It was amalgamated into the National Bank of Australasia in 1918, taking effect from October that year.

The bank's former headquarters was demolished in 1932. The building's ornate doorway was saved during demolition after calls from the Royal Victorian Institute of Architects, dismantled and relocated to the University of Melbourne, first as the entry to their School of Physiology and then in 1973 as an entrance to a car park. Many other buildings constructed by the bank for their branches remain today, with the former Bendigo branch listed on the Victorian Heritage Register.
