= Riversdale railway station =

Railway station in Melbourne, Australia

Riversdale
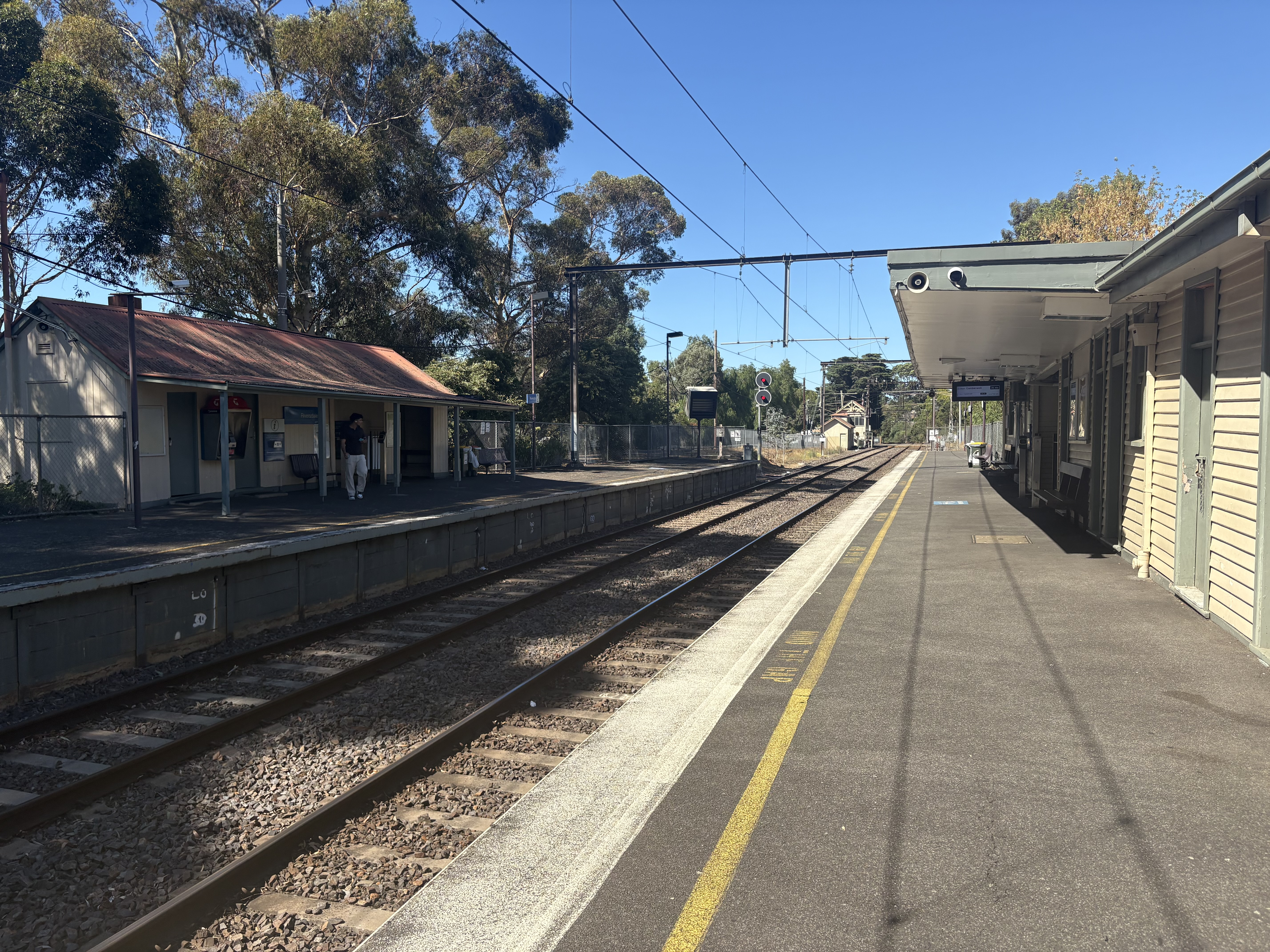
- Southbound view from Platform 1, March 2025

General information
- Location: Wandin Road, Camberwell, Victoria 3124; City of Boroondara; Australia
- Coordinates: 37°49′53″S 145°04′11″E
- System: PTV commuter rail station
- Owner: VicTrack
- Operator: Metro Trains
- Line: Alamein
- Distance: 11.73 kilometres from Southern Cross
- Platforms: 2 side
- Tracks: 2
- Connections: Bus; Tram

Construction
- Structure type: Ground
- Parking: 32
- Cycle facilities: Yes
- Accessible: No—steep ramp

Other information
- Status: Operational, unstaffed
- Station code: RIV
- Fare zone: Myki zone 1
- Website: Public Transport Victoria

History
- Opened: 30 May 1890; 136 years ago
- Electrified: October 1924 (1500 V DC overhead)
- Former names: Prospect Hill (provisionally)

Passengers
- 2005–2006: 235,092
- 2006–2007: 268,875 ▲14.37%
- 2007–2008: 299,017 ▲11.21%
- 2008–2009: 257,490 ▼13.88%
- 2009–2010: 256,467 ▼0.39%
- 2010–2011: 265,925 ▲3.68%
- 2011–2012: 242,225 ▼8.91%
- 2012–2013: Not measured
- 2013–2014: 234,983 ▼2.98%
- 2014–2015: 230,318 ▼1.98%
- 2015–2016: 224,223 ▼2.64%
- 2016–2017: 224,328 ▲0.046%
- 2017–2018: 231,450 ▲3.17%
- 2018–2019: 214,700 ▼7.23%
- 2019–2020: 161,750 ▼24.66%
- 2020–2021: 73,250 ▼54.71%
- 2021–2022: 85,550 ▲16.79%
- 2022–2023: 169,350 ▲97.95%
- 2023–2024: 146,100 ▼13.73%
- 2024–2025: 144,000 ▼1.44%

Services
Preceding station	Metro Trains	Following station
Camberwell towards Flinders Street	Alamein line Peak only	Willison towards Alamein
Camberwell Terminus	Alamein line Shuttle service	Willison towards Alamein
Former services
Preceding station	Disused railways	Following station
Shenley towards Fairfield	Outer Circle line	Burwood towards Oakleigh
East Camberwell towards East Kew	Alamein line	Willison towards Ashburton
	List of closed railway stations in Melbourne	
Track layout
Location

Riversdale station is a railway station operated by Metro Trains Melbourne on the Alamein line, which is part of the Melbourne rail network. It serves the eastern suburb of Camberwell, in Melbourne, Victoria, Australia. Riversdale station is a ground level unstaffed station, featuring two side platforms. It opened on 30 May 1890.

The station was provisionally named as Prospect Hill. However, during construction, it was given the name "Riversdale".

A number of services terminate at Riversdale after the morning and evening peaks and return to Camberwell for stabling.

== History ==
Riversdale station opened on 30 May 1890, along with the first section of the Outer Circle line. Prior to opening, it was provisionally called Prospect Hill, however, it has been named Riversdale since it opened. The name derives from the nearby Riversdale Road, itself named by parliamentarian and local resident Matthew O'Grady. O'Grady named it after the fact that the road leads to the valley of the Yarra River.

Though it was closed for a year in 1897 and 1898, when the Outer Circle line closed, it reopened soon after due to a public outcry.

In 1915, the current down platform (Platform 2) was provided, as well as two goods sidings. In 1922, a siding for Camberwell Council was provided.

By 1948, the council siding was removed and, by 1953, all remaining sidings were abolished. On 31 July 1955, the line was duplicated to Hartwell and, on 29 November 1959, the line was duplicated to Camberwell. The duplication to Camberwell included a flyover for the down line, which crosses over the Belgrave and Lilydale lines, and the replacement of hand gates with boom barriers at the Prospect Hill Road level crossing, located nearby in the up direction of the station.

The level crossing at Riversdale Road, located at the down end of the station, features unusual manually operated boom barriers, which are controlled by a signal box. The boom barrier arms are divided into two sections, so as not to make contact with the overhead tram wires. These boom barriers were provided in 1963, and replaced interlocked gates.

In 1972, both platforms were extended at the up end.

== Platforms and services ==
Riversdale has two side platforms. It is serviced by Metro Trains' Alamein line services.

Riversdale platform arrangement
Platform	Line	Destination	Via	Service Type	Notes	Source
1	Alamein line '	Camberwell		All stations	Offpeak and weekends.	
1	Alamein line '	Flinders Street	City Loop	All stations and limited express services	See City Loop for operating patterns Weekday peaks only.	
2	Alamein line	Alamein		All stations		

== Transport links ==
CDC Melbourne operates one bus route via Riversdale station, under contract to Public Transport Victoria:

- 612 : Box Hill station – Chadstone Shopping Centre

Yarra Trams operates one route via Riversdale station:

- : Docklands (Waterfront City) – Wattle Park
