= Auburn, Victoria =

Auburn
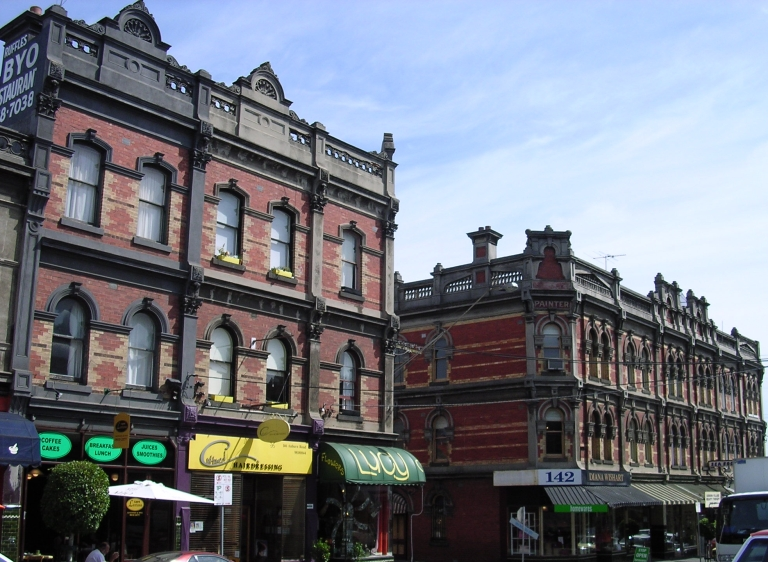
- Victorian streetscape of Auburn Road

- Interactive map of Auburn
- Coordinates: 37.8238°S 145.0447°E
- Country: Australia
- State: Victoria
- City: Melbourne
- LGA: City of Boroondara

Government
  - State electorate: Hawthorn
  - Federal division: Kooyong
- Postcode: 3123

Auburn is a locality within the suburb of Hawthorn, Victoria. It is located approximately 8 kilometres east of the Melbourne CBD, and is centred around its railway station and Auburn Road.

== History ==
The area now known as Auburn was first known post-colonisation as Red Gum Flat, well-regarded for clay products. The area around between Rathmines and Burke Roads was also known as Rathmines Village.

The present name Auburn has two possible origins, both large 1850s residences. Reverend Henry Liddiard, for whom nearby Liddiard Street is named, owned Auburn Lodge south of Burwood Road between Glenferrie and Auburn Roads, while to the south John Collings constructed Auburn House near today's Goodall Street.

The construction of a railway line between Hawthorn and Lilydale, which opened on 3 April 1882, included a railway station at the level crossing with Auburn Road. This encouraged further land development and commercial growth, including the opening of the Auburn Hotel in 1888.

== Architecture ==
The area is renowned for its commercial Victorian architecture, particularly along Auburn (and to a lesser degree Burwood) roads.

Located at the intersection of Auburn and Victoria Roads, next to the train station, the Auburn Hotel opened in 1888 as a large, 3-storey coffee palace in the Second Empire style. The Hotel was also briefly known as the 'Geebung Polo Club'.

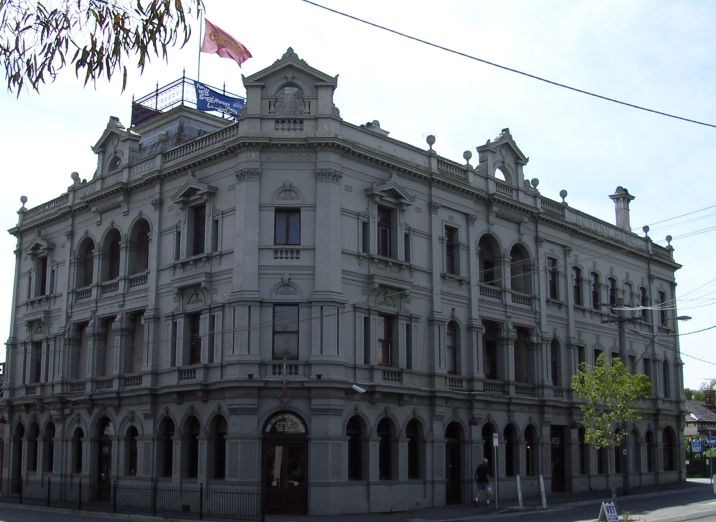
Auburn Hotel, built in 1888

The streetscape on Auburn Road is also generally well-preserved. Three-storey red brick shops and other two-storey Victorian-era buildings are prominent. On the south side of Burwood Road, the Murphy Brothers' grain store stands from 1906.

Auburn Post Office opened on 10 April 1893.

== Transport ==
The area is serviced predominantly by Auburn railway station, located on the Alamein, Belgrave and Lilydale lines of the Melbourne suburban rail network.

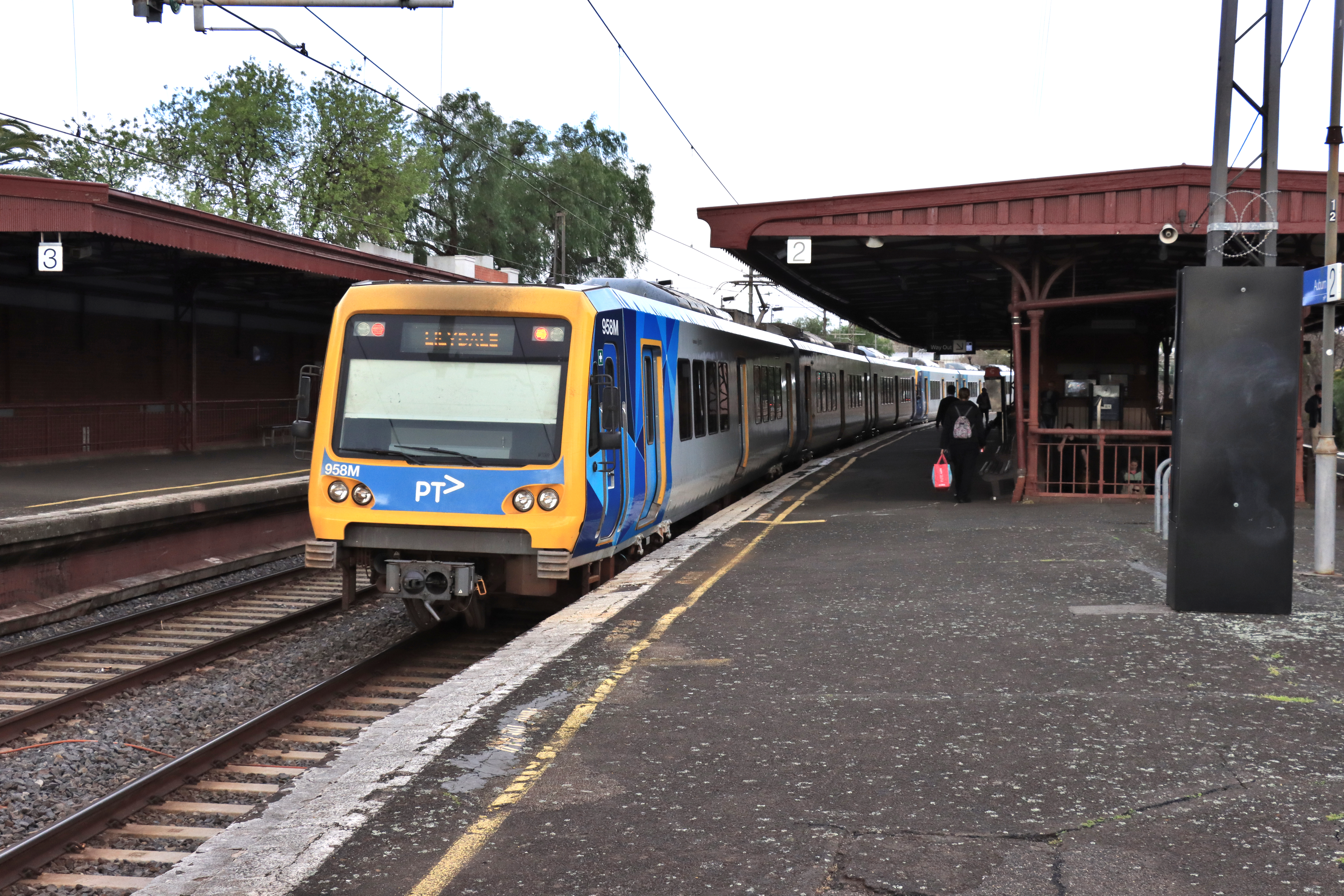
An Xtrapolis 100 train departing Auburn Station in 2024

Auburn Road, running north-south through the area, is served by the 624 bus route (Kew - Oakleigh via Caulfield & Chadstone).
