= Hartwell railway station =

Railway station in Victoria, Australia

Hartwell
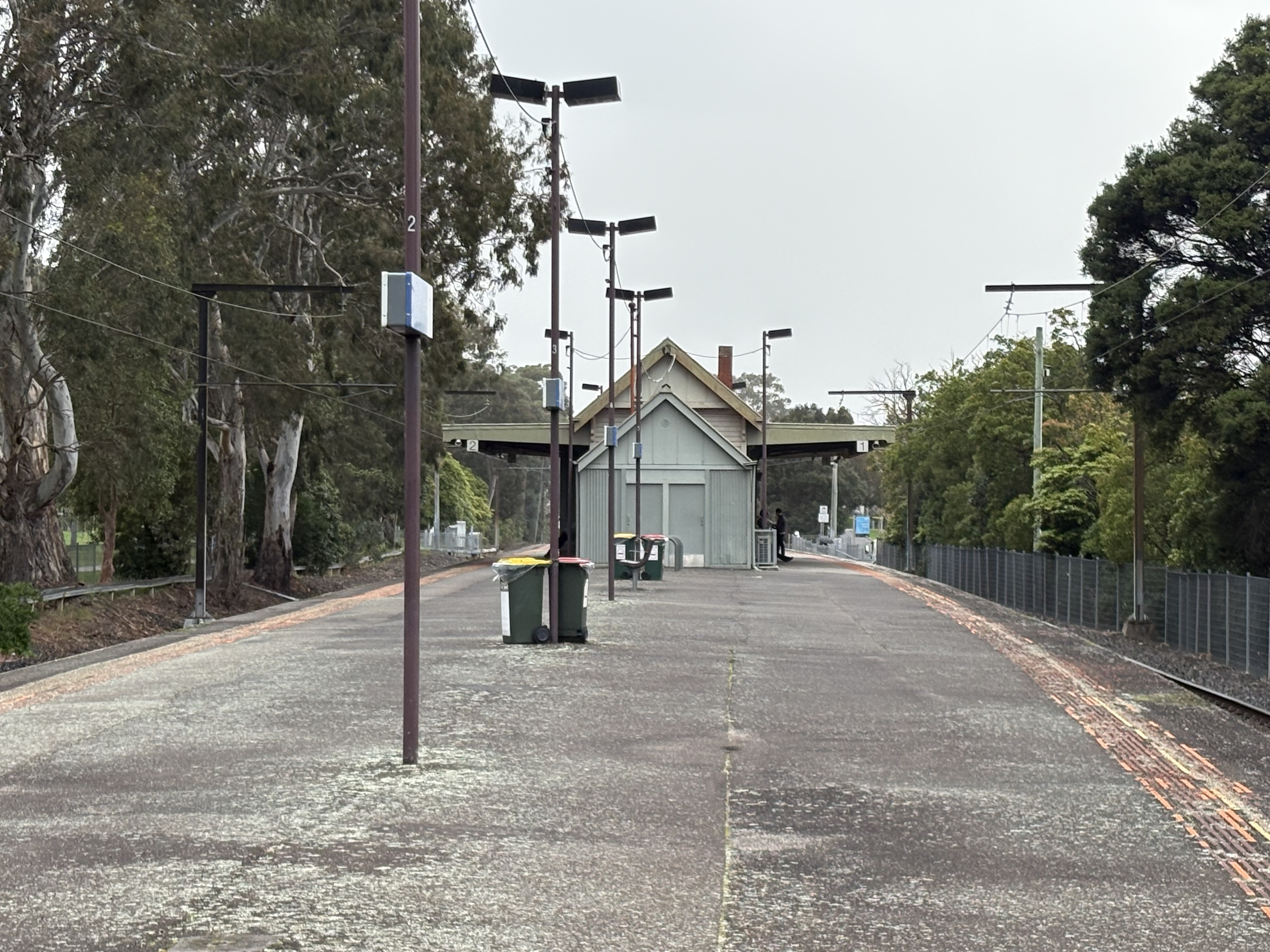
- Southbound view of the island platform and station building, August 2026

General information
- Location: Georgina Parade, Camberwell, Victoria 3124; City of Boroondara; Australia
- Coordinates: 37°50′39″S 145°04′32″E
- System: PTV commuter rail station
- Owner: VicTrack
- Operator: Metro Trains
- Line: Alamein
- Distance: 13.30 kilometres from Southern Cross
- Platforms: 2 (1 island)
- Tracks: 2

Construction
- Structure type: Ground
- Cycle facilities: Yes
- Accessible: No—steep ramp

Other information
- Status: Operational, unstaffed
- Station code: HWL
- Fare zone: Myki zone 1
- Website: Public Transport Victoria

History
- Opened: 7 May 1906; 120 years ago
- Rebuilt: December 1938
- Electrified: October 1924 (1500 V DC overhead)
- Former names: Hartwell Hill (1906–1909)

Passengers
- 2005–2006: 166,044
- 2006–2007: 181,077 ▲9.05%
- 2007–2008: 185,688 ▲2.54%
- 2008–2009: 192,025 ▲3.41%
- 2009–2010: 190,937 ▼0.56%
- 2010–2011: 204,140 ▲6.91%
- 2011–2012: 192,506 ▼5.69%
- 2012–2013: Not measured
- 2013–2014: 205,969 ▲6.99%
- 2014–2015: 195,841 ▼4.91%
- 2015–2016: 192,507 ▼1.7%
- 2016–2017: 209,306 ▲8.72%
- 2017–2018: 207,705 ▼0.76%
- 2018–2019: 214,350 ▲3.19%
- 2019–2020: 165,200 ▼22.93%
- 2020–2021: 66,400 ▼59.8%
- 2021–2022: 75,500 ▲13.7%
- 2022–2023: 117,950 ▲56.22%
- 2023–2024: 132,400 ▲12.25%
- 2024–2025: 138,050 ▲4.27%

Services
Preceding station	Metro Trains	Following station
Willison towards Flinders Street	Alamein line Peak only	Burwood towards Alamein
Willison towards Camberwell	Alamein line Shuttle service	Burwood towards Alamein
Track layout
Location

Hartwell station is a railway station operated by Metro Trains Melbourne on the Alamein line, which is part of the Melbourne rail network. It serves the eastern suburb of Camberwell, in Melbourne, Victoria, Australia. It opened on 7 May 1906, with the current station building provided in 1938.

Initially opened as Hartwell Hill, the station was given its current name of Hartwell on 1 August 1909. It is the only station on the Alamein line to have an island platform.

== History ==
In the 1850s, Hartwell was a small hamlet named after the nearby Back Creek. Minutes of meetings of the Boroondara District Roads Board noted that "c/- Irwin Hotel, Back Creek" was used as a polling station. Hartwell is named after one of the early estates in the area, Hartwell House, the residence of James Irwin. In the mid-1850s, he owned and operated Irwin's Hotel, which was on the corner of Norwood (now Toorak) and Wattle Valley roads, and was demolished about the time the railway line was built.

The original station was described as using a very small, galvanised iron shed for passenger shelter, mounted on a short, cinder-surfaced platform.

For a couple of decades after the station opened, Hartwell passengers were served by a train consisting of a locomotive and one or two carriages, dubbed the "Deepdene Dasher", which operated between Deepdene and Ashburton stations. After the line from Camberwell to Ashburton was electrified in 1924, Hartwell was served by electric trains on the Ashburton line, which was extended to Alamein in 1948.

The station building was originally at Walhalla, the terminus of the Walhalla line, but was moved to Hartwell in December 1938, six years before the Walhalla line closed in 1944. Until the Alamein line was converted from single to double track in 1954 (to Ashburton) and 1955 (to Riversdale), Hartwell was the only crossing loop on the line.

On 27 December 1948, an Alamein-bound train was derailed at the Flinders Street (up) end of the station, near a set of points. While the track was blocked, a shuttle service was provided between Hartwell and Alamein, but passengers going beyond Hartwell had to take trams.

== Platforms and services ==
Hartwell has an island platform with two faces and is served by Alamein line trains.

Hartwell platform arrangement
Platform	Line	Destination	Via	Service Type	Notes	Source
1	Alamein line '	Camberwell		All stations	Offpeak and weekends.	
1	Alamein line '	Flinders Street	City Loop	All stations and limited express services	See City Loop for operating patterns Weekday peaks only.	
2	Alamein line	Alamein		All stations		
