= Willison railway station =

Railway station in Melbourne, Australia

Willison
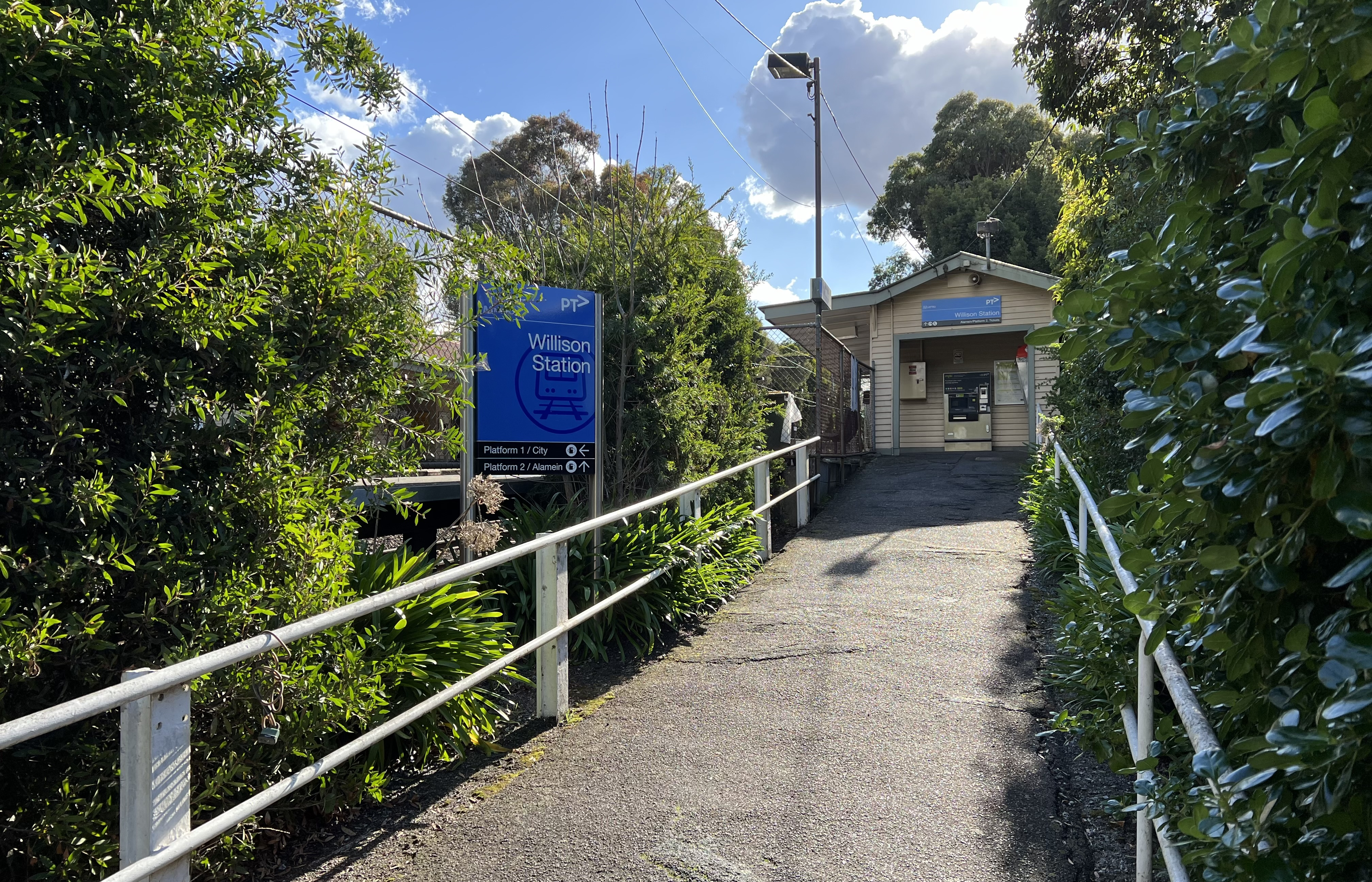
- Station building and entrance on the south side, June 2024

General information
- Location: Stodart Street, Camberwell, Victoria 3124; City of Boroondara; Australia
- Coordinates: 37°50′09″S 145°04′13″E
- System: PTV commuter rail station
- Owner: VicTrack
- Operator: Metro Trains
- Line: Alamein
- Distance: 12.15 kilometres from Southern Cross
- Platforms: 2 side
- Tracks: 2

Construction
- Structure type: Ground
- Parking: Yes
- Cycle facilities: Yes
- Accessible: No—steep ramp

Other information
- Status: Operational, unstaffed
- Station code: WSN
- Fare zone: Myki zone 1
- Website: Public Transport Victoria

History
- Opened: 8 June 1908; 118 years ago
- Rebuilt: 19 December 1954; 1972
- Electrified: October 1924 (1500 V DC overhead)
- Former names: Golf Links (1908-1936)

Passengers
- 2005–2006: 84,779
- 2006–2007: 96,596 ▲13.93%
- 2007–2008: 102,947 ▲6.57%
- 2008–2009: 96,312 ▼6.44%
- 2009–2010: 96,346 ▲0.035%
- 2010–2011: 97,112 ▲0.79%
- 2011–2012: 87,210 ▼10.19%
- 2012–2013: Not measured
- 2013–2014: 87,614 ▲0.46%
- 2014–2015: 87,730 ▲0.13%
- 2015–2016: 94,688 ▲7.93%
- 2016–2017: 97,248 ▲2.7%
- 2017–2018: 104,182 ▲7.13%
- 2018–2019: 102,600 ▼1.51%
- 2019–2020: 80,300 ▼21.73%
- 2020–2021: 32,400 ▼59.65%
- 2021–2022: 35,750 ▲10.34%
- 2022–2023: 62,800 ▲75.66%
- 2023–2024: 75,100 ▲19.59%
- 2024–2025: 73,100 ▼2.66%

Services
| Preceding station | Metro Trains | Following station |
|---|---|---|
| Riversdale towards Flinders Street | Alamein line Peak only | Hartwell towards Alamein |
| Riversdale towards Camberwell | Alamein line Shuttle service | Hartwell towards Alamein |
Track layout
Location

Willison station is a railway station operated by Metro Trains Melbourne on the Alamein line, part of the Melbourne rail network. It serves the eastern Melbourne suburb of Camberwell in Victoria, Australia. Willison is a ground level unstaffed station, featuring two side platforms. It opened on 8 June 1908, with the current station provided in 1954 and platforms in 1972.

Initially opened as Golf Links, the station was given its current name of Willison on 23 July 1936.

== History ==
Willison station was not part of the original Outer Circle line. It was provided for the convenience of members of the Riversdale Golf Club, which was originally adjacent to the site. It has been said that influential club members did not appreciate having to walk to either Riversdale or Hartwell, and pressed for a closer alternative. That almost certainly explains why Willison was built so close to Riversdale, being only 400 metres away. The club moved from the site in 1927 and, on 23 July 1936, the station was renamed Willison, after A. J. Willison, a former member of Camberwell Council.

The original station was described as being a "very narrow short platform constructed entirely of sleepers with a very small galvanised iron shed for passenger shelter."

The station was originally served by the so-called Deepdene Dasher, which ran a shuttle on the remnant of the Outer Circle line between Ashburton and Deepdene. After the Deepdene Dasher ceased operation in 1927, the station was served by Ashburton line trains. Twelve years later, on 28 June 1948, the line was extended from Ashburton to Alamein, the service which still exists today.

In 1954, the current station platforms were provided when the line was duplicated between Riversdale and Hartwell. In 1972, both platforms were extended at the down end, and a pedestrian crossing was relocated.

During the 2018/2019 financial year, Willison was the sixth-least-used station on Melbourne's metropolitan network, with 102,600 passenger movements.

== Platforms and services ==
Willison has two side platforms. It is served by Alamein line trains.

Willison platform arrangement
| Platform | Line | Destination | Via | Service Type | Notes | Source |
|---|---|---|---|---|---|---|
| 1 | Alamein line ' | Camberwell | | All stations | Offpeak and weekends. | |
| 1 | Alamein line ' | Flinders Street | City Loop | All stations and limited express services | See City Loop for operating patterns Weekday peaks only. | |
| 2 | Alamein line | Alamein | | All stations | | |

== Gallery ==
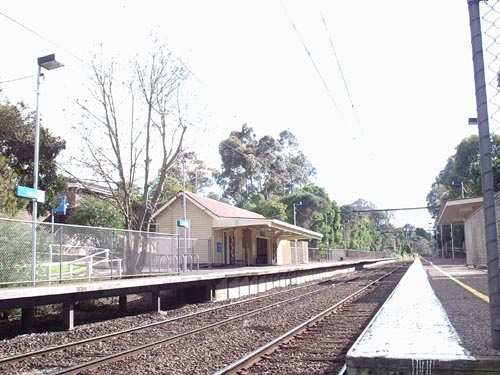
Northbound view of station platforms, March 2003

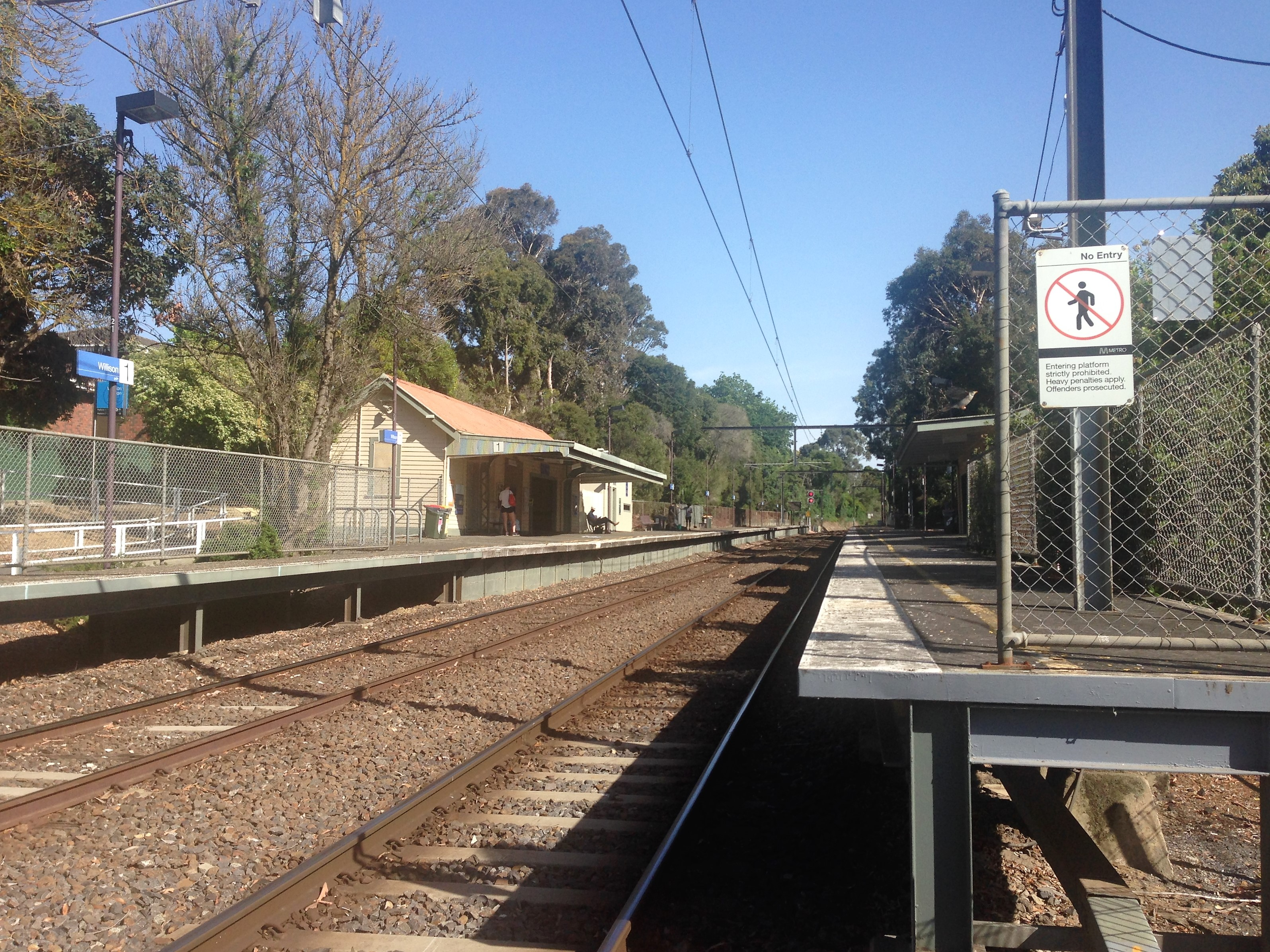
Northbound view of station platforms, December 2018
