= Glenferrie railway station =

Railway station in Melbourne, Australia

Glenferrie
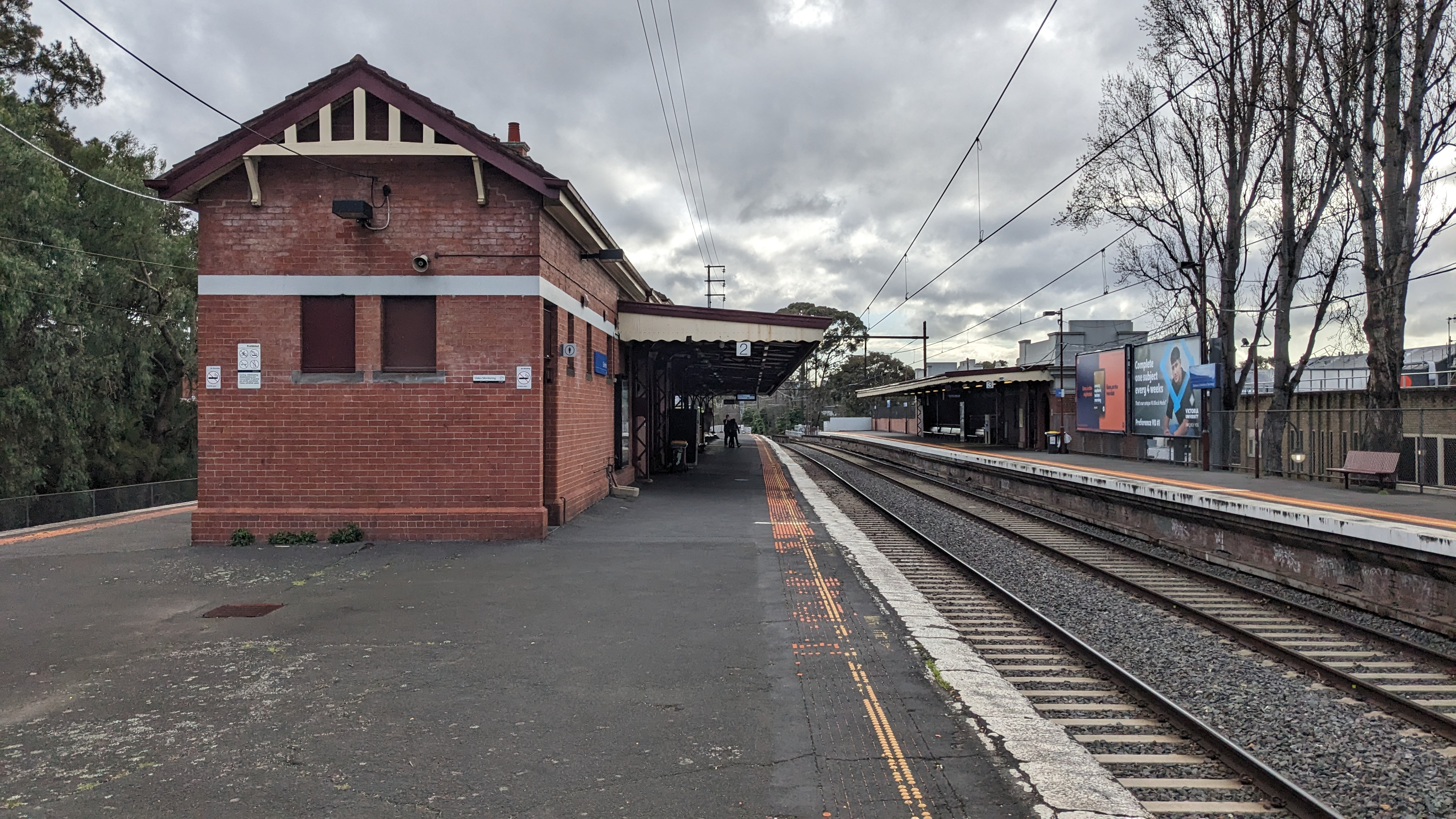
- Westbound view from Platform 2, August 2024

General information
- Location: Glenferrie Road, Hawthorn, Victoria 3122; City of Boroondara; Australia
- Coordinates: 37°49′18″S 145°02′12″E
- System: PTV commuter rail station
- Owner: VicTrack
- Operator: Metro Trains
- Lines: Lilydale Belgrave; Alamein (Note: Peak only)
- Distance: 8.12 kilometres from Southern Cross
- Platforms: 3 (1 island, 1 side)
- Tracks: 3
- Connections: Tram

Construction
- Structure type: Elevated
- Cycle facilities: Yes
- Accessible: No—steep ramp

Other information
- Status: Operational, premium station
- Station code: GFE
- Fare zone: Myki zone 1
- Website: Public Transport Victoria

History
- Opened: 3 April 1882; 144 years ago
- Rebuilt: 8 December 1963
- Electrified: December 1922 (1500 V DC overhead)
- Former names: Glenferrie Road (1882)

Passengers
- 2005–2006: 1,933,463
- 2006–2007: 2,202,905 ▲13.93%
- 2007–2008: 2,449,830 ▲11.2%
- 2008–2009: 2,250,901 ▼8.12%
- 2009–2010: 2,303,926 ▲2.35%
- 2010–2011: 2,701,393 ▲17.25%
- 2011–2012: 2,355,864 ▼12.79%
- 2012–2013: Not measured
- 2013–2014: 2,858,142 ▲21.32%
- 2014–2015: 2,808,939 ▼1.72%
- 2015–2016: 2,798,954 ▼0.35%
- 2016–2017: 2,733,069 ▼2.35%
- 2017–2018: 2,720,071 ▼0.47%
- 2018–2019: 2,729,100 ▲0.33%
- 2019–2020: 1,949,900 ▼28.55%
- 2020–2021: 749,450 ▼61.56%
- 2021–2022: 1,068,450 ▲42.56%
- 2022–2023: 1,747,000 ▲63.51%
- 2023–2024: 1,996,050 ▲14.26%
- 2024–2025: 1,978,650 ▼0.87%

Services
Preceding station	Metro Trains	Following station
Hawthorn towards Flinders Street	Lilydale line	Auburn towards Lilydale
Hawthorn towards Flinders Street	Belgrave line	Auburn towards Belgrave
Hawthorn towards Flinders Street	Alamein line Peak only	Auburn towards Alamein
Weekday express services
Richmond towards Flinders Street	Lilydale line	Camberwell towards Belgrave or Lilydale
Richmond towards Flinders Street	Belgrave line	Camberwell towards Belgrave or Lilydale

Victorian Heritage Register
- Official name: Glenferrie Railway Station Complex
- Type: Registered Place
- Designated: 20 August 1982
- Reference no.: H1671
- Heritage overlay no.: HO046
- Category: Transport – Rail
Track layout
Location

Glenferrie station is a railway station operated by Metro Trains Melbourne on the Alamein, Belgrave and Lilydale lines, which are part of the Melbourne rail network. It serves the eastern suburb of Hawthorn, in Melbourne, Victoria, Australia. Glenferrie station is an elevated structure premium station, featuring three platforms, an island platform with two faces and one side platform. The first station opened on 3 April 1882, with the current station built in 1916. The station was added to the Victorian Heritage Register on 20 August 1982 in recognition of its historic and architectural significance.

Initially opened as Glenferrie Road, the station was given its current name of Glenferrie on 1 September 1882, seven months after services began. Much of the station's current traffic serves the nearby Hawthorn campus of the Swinburne University of Technology.

== History ==
Glenferrie station opened on 3 April 1882, when the railway line from Hawthorn was extended to Camberwell. The station is named after the adjacent Glenferrie Road, itself named after a property which was purchased by solicitor Peter Ferrie in 1840, who later named the property Glen Ferrie.

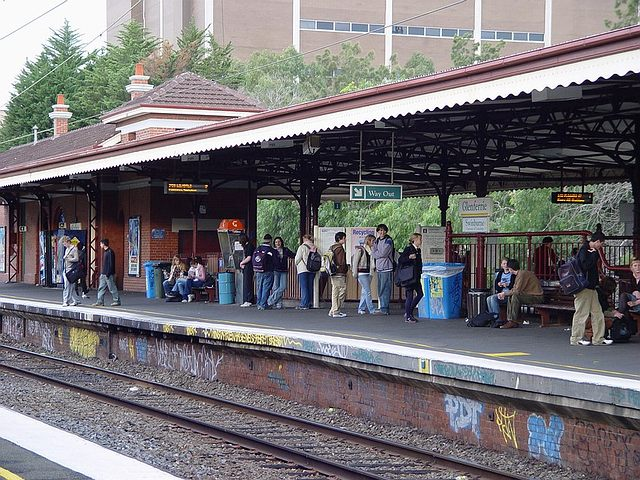
The station in 2004, looking to Platform 2

In 1916, as part of an extensive grade separation scheme between Hawthorn and Camberwell, a new elevated station was built. It had an allowance for a future set of tracks and another rail bridge to the south. The station was designed by the Victorian Railway's architect Edward Ballard under the Department's Chief Architect J W Hardy, and included shops on Glenferrie Road and utilised walkways on either side for access. The extra track was added in 1963, with the up platform becoming an island, and the centre track becoming bi-directional for express services. The station features red brick and stucco facades punctuated by arches, switchback ramps up to the platforms, and the island platform has a very wide canopy. Auburn Station was built at the same time and is almost identical, and both were added to the Victorian Heritage Register in 1982.

On 26 February 1996, Glenferrie was upgraded to a premium station.

== Platforms and services ==
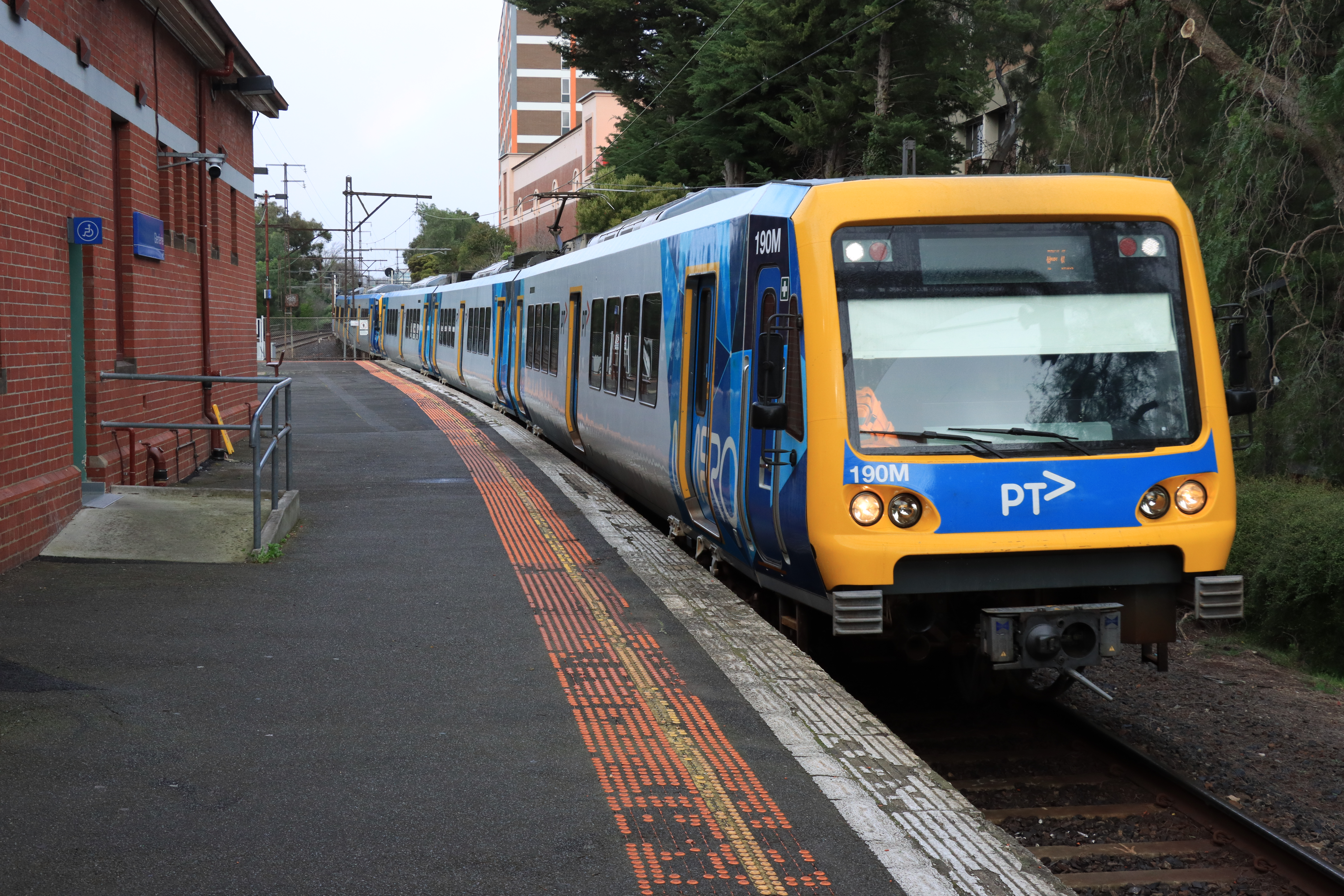
An X'Trapolis train on a Flinders Street-bound service arrives at Platform 1, August 2024

Glenferrie has one island platform with two faces, and one side platform. It is serviced by Metro Trains' Lilydale, Belgrave and Alamein line services.

Glenferrie platform arrangement
Platform	Line	Destination	Via	Service Type	Notes	Source
1	Alamein line Belgrave line Lilydale line	Flinders Street	City Loop	All stations and limited express services	See City Loop for operating patterns	
2	Belgrave line Lilydale line	Flinders Street	City Loop	All stations and limited express services	See City Loop for operating patterns	
2	Belgrave line Lilydale line	Mooroolbark, Lilydale, Upper Ferntree Gully or Belgrave		All stations and limited express services		
3	Alamein line Belgrave line Lilydale line	Alamein, Blackburn, Ringwood, Mooroolbark, Lilydale or Belgrave		All stations and limited express services		

== Transport links ==
Yarra Trams operates one route via Glenferrie station:

- : Melbourne University – Kew
