= Auburn railway station, Melbourne =

Railway station in Melbourne, Australia

Auburn
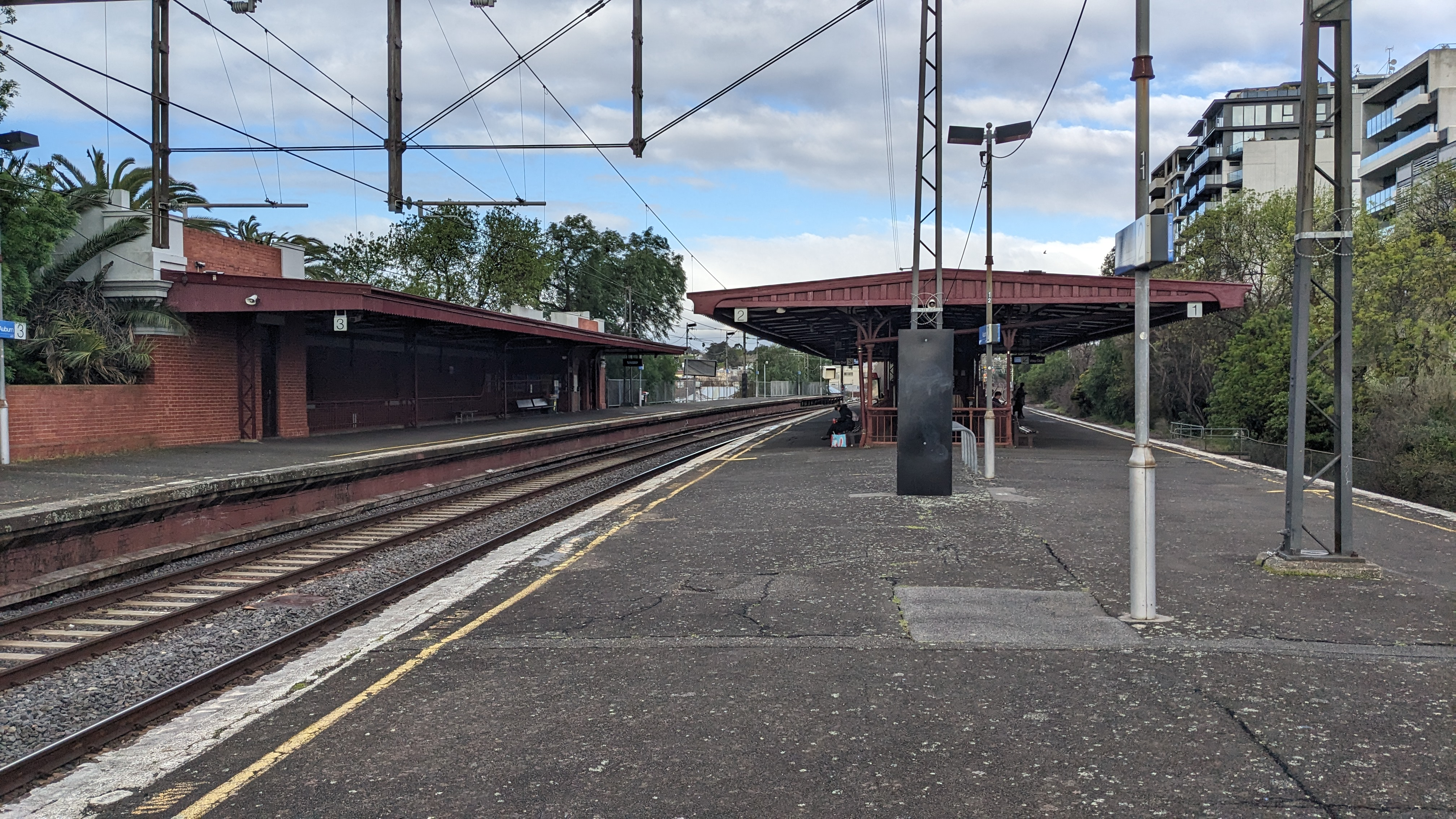
- Eastbound view from Platform 2, August 2024

General information
- Location: Auburn Road, Hawthorn East, Victoria 3123; City of Boroondara; Australia
- Coordinates: 37°49′21″S 145°02′46″E
- System: PTV commuter rail station
- Owner: VicTrack
- Operator: Metro Trains
- Lines: Lilydale Belgrave; Alamein (Note: Peak only)
- Distance: 8.96 kilometres from Southern Cross
- Platforms: 3 (1 island, 1 side)
- Tracks: 3
- Connections: Bus

Construction
- Structure type: Ground
- Cycle facilities: Yes
- Accessible: No—steep ramp

Other information
- Status: Operational, host station
- Station code: AUB
- Fare zone: Myki zone 1
- Website: Public Transport Victoria

History
- Opened: 3 April 1882; 144 years ago
- Rebuilt: 1916; 8 December 1963
- Electrified: December 1922 (1500 V DC overhead)
- Former names: Auburn Road (1882)

Passengers
- 2005–2006: 491,468
- 2006–2007: 576,638 ▲17.33%
- 2007–2008: 662,429 ▲14.87%
- 2008–2009: 635,399 ▼4.08%
- 2009–2010: 648,381 ▲2.04%
- 2010–2011: 688,923 ▲6.25%
- 2011–2012: 613,467 ▼10.95%
- 2012–2013: Not measured
- 2013–2014: 642,837 ▲4.78%
- 2014–2015: 643,345 ▲0.07%
- 2015–2016: 766,697 ▲19.17%
- 2016–2017: 762,913 ▼0.49%
- 2017–2018: 747,182 ▼2.06%
- 2018–2019: 744,050 ▼0.41%
- 2019–2020: 584,350 ▼21.46%
- 2020–2021: 278,650 ▼52.31%
- 2021–2022: 331,450 ▲18.94%
- 2022–2023: 555,400 ▲67.57%
- 2023–2024: 626,150 ▲12.74%
- 2024–2025: 650,000 ▲3.81%

Services
Preceding station	Metro Trains	Following station
Glenferrie towards Flinders Street	Lilydale line	Camberwell towards Lilydale
Glenferrie towards Flinders Street	Belgrave line	Camberwell towards Belgrave
Glenferrie towards Flinders Street	Alamein line Peak only	Camberwell towards Alamein

Victorian Heritage Register
- Official name: Auburn Railway Station Complex
- Type: Registered Place
- Designated: 20 August 1982
- Reference no.: H1559
- Heritage overlay no.: HO132
- Category: Transport – Rail
Track layout
Location

Auburn station is a railway station operated by Metro Trains Melbourne on the Alamein, Lilydale and Belgrave lines, which are part of the Melbourne rail network. It serves the eastern suburb of Hawthorn East, in Melbourne, Victoria, Australia. Auburn station is a ground level host station, featuring three platforms, an island platform with two faces and one side platform. It opened on 3 April 1882, with the current station provided in 1916.

Initially opened as Auburn Road, the station was given its current name of Auburn on 1 September 1882.

== History ==
Auburn station opened on 3 April 1882, when the railway line from Hawthorn was extended to Camberwell. The station was named after two nearby residences which were built in the 1850s. Reverend Henry Liddiard's Auburn Lodge was built south of Burwood Road, between Glenferrie and Auburn Roads, while John Collings' Auburn House was built south of Liddiard's residence in the present day Goodall Street.

In 1916, as part of an extensive grade separation scheme between Hawthorn and Camberwell, a new elevated station was built. It had an allowance for a future set of tracks and another rail bridge to the south. The station was designed by the Victorian Railway's architect Edward Ballard under the Department's Chief Architect J W Hardy. The extra track was added in 1963, with the up platform becoming an island, and the centre track becoming bi-directional for express services. The station features red brick and stucco facades punctuated by arches, switchback ramps up to the platforms, and the island platform has a very wide canopy. Glenferrie Station was built at the same time and is almost identical, and both were added to the Victorian Heritage Register in 1982.

== Platforms and services ==
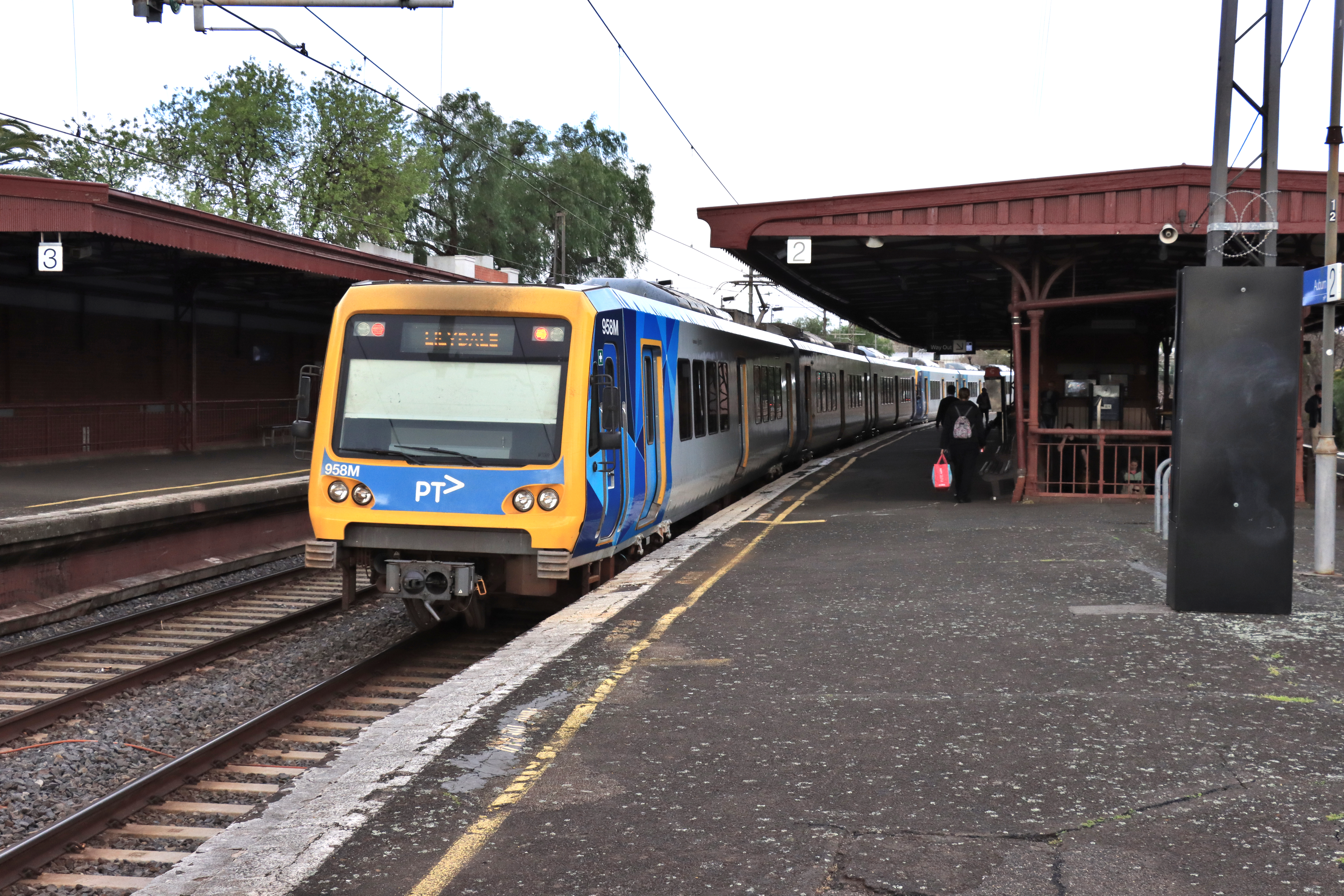
An X'Trapolis train on a Lilydale-bound service departs Platform 2, August 2024

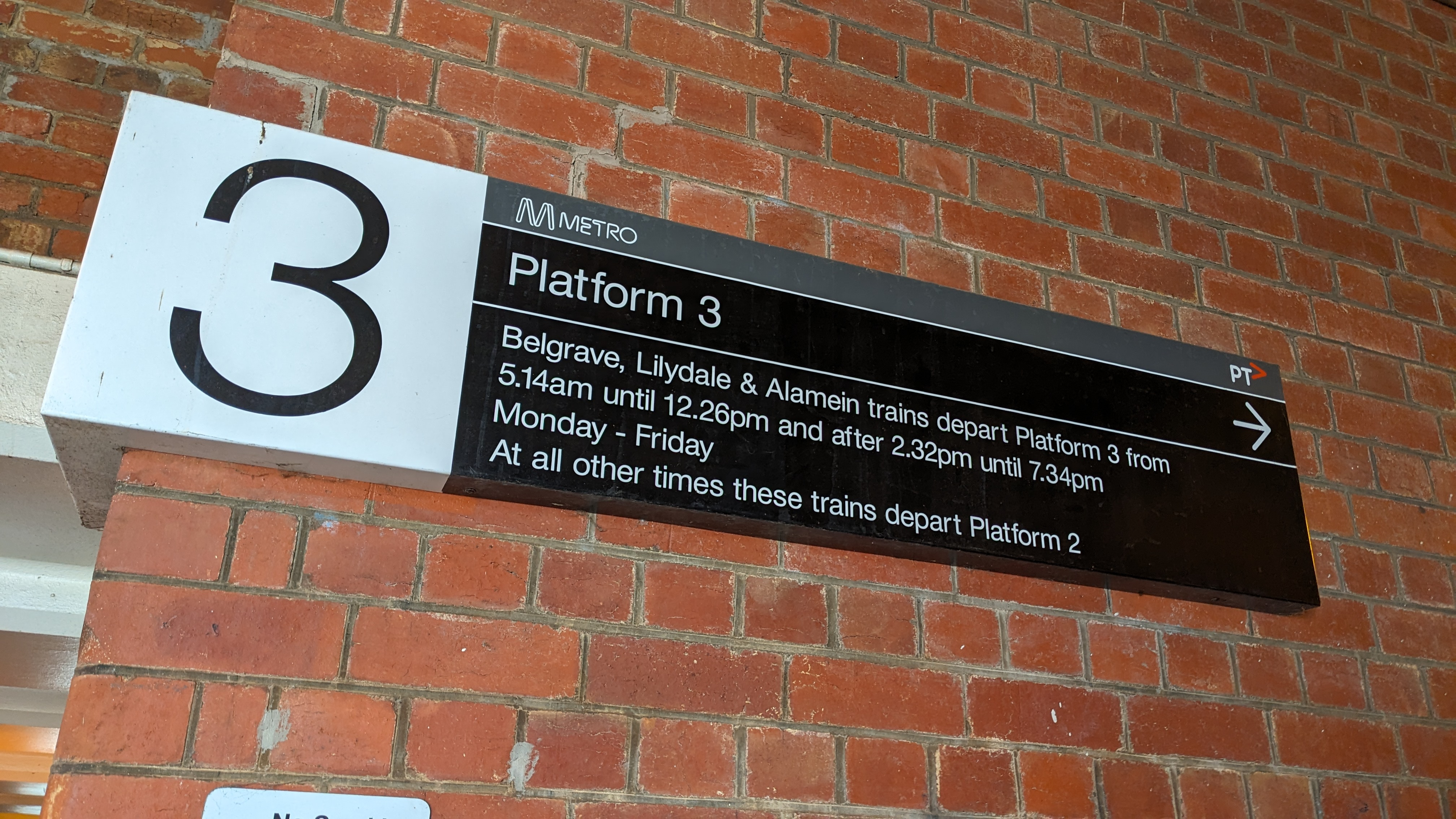
Sign explaining stopping patterns for Platform 3 at Auburn Railway Station.

Auburn has one island platform with two faces and one side platform. It is serviced by Metro Trains' Lilydale, Belgrave and Alamein line services.

Auburn platform arrangement
Platform	Line	Destination	Via	Service Type	Notes	Source
1	Alamein line Belgrave line Lilydale line	Flinders Street	City Loop	All stations and limited express services	See City Loop for operating patterns	
2	Belgrave line Lilydale line	Lilydale or Belgrave		All stations	Weekends only.	
3	Alamein line Lilydale line	Alamein, Blackburn, Ringwood or Lilydale		All stations and limited express services	Weekdays only.	

== Transport links ==
CDC Melbourne operates one bus route via Auburn station, under contract to Public Transport Victoria:

- 624 : Kew – Oakleigh station

== Gallery ==
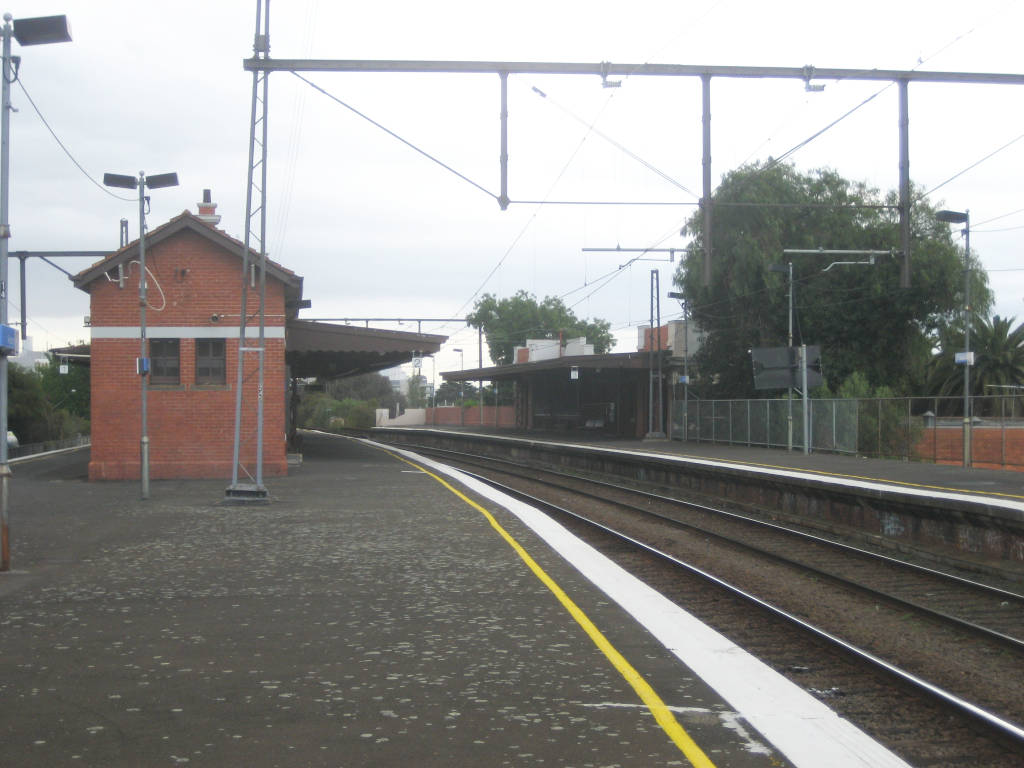
Westbound view from Platform 2, October 2007

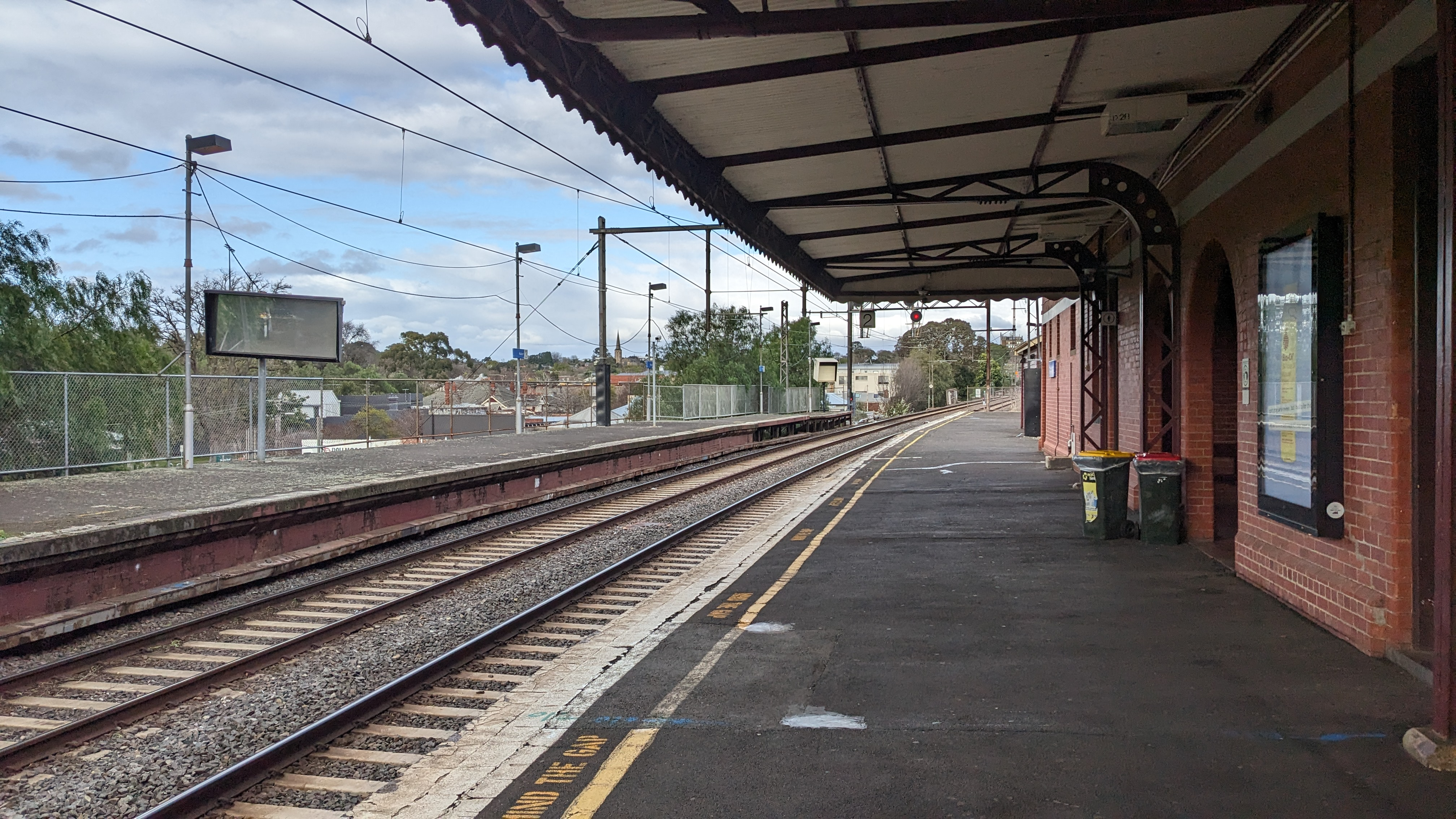
Eastbound view from Platform 2 underneath the platform's canopy, August 2024

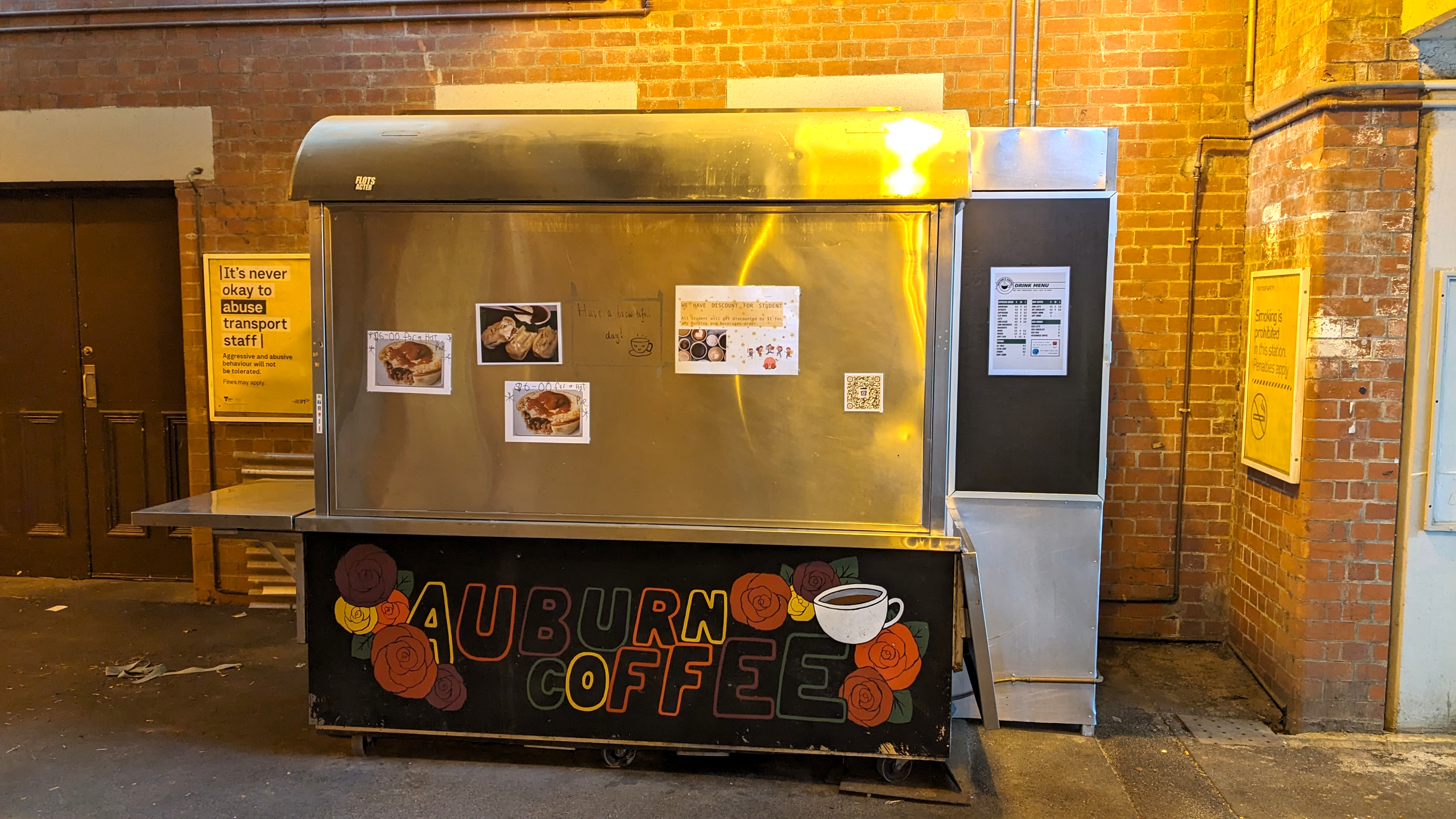
The coffee cart inside the entrance, August 2024

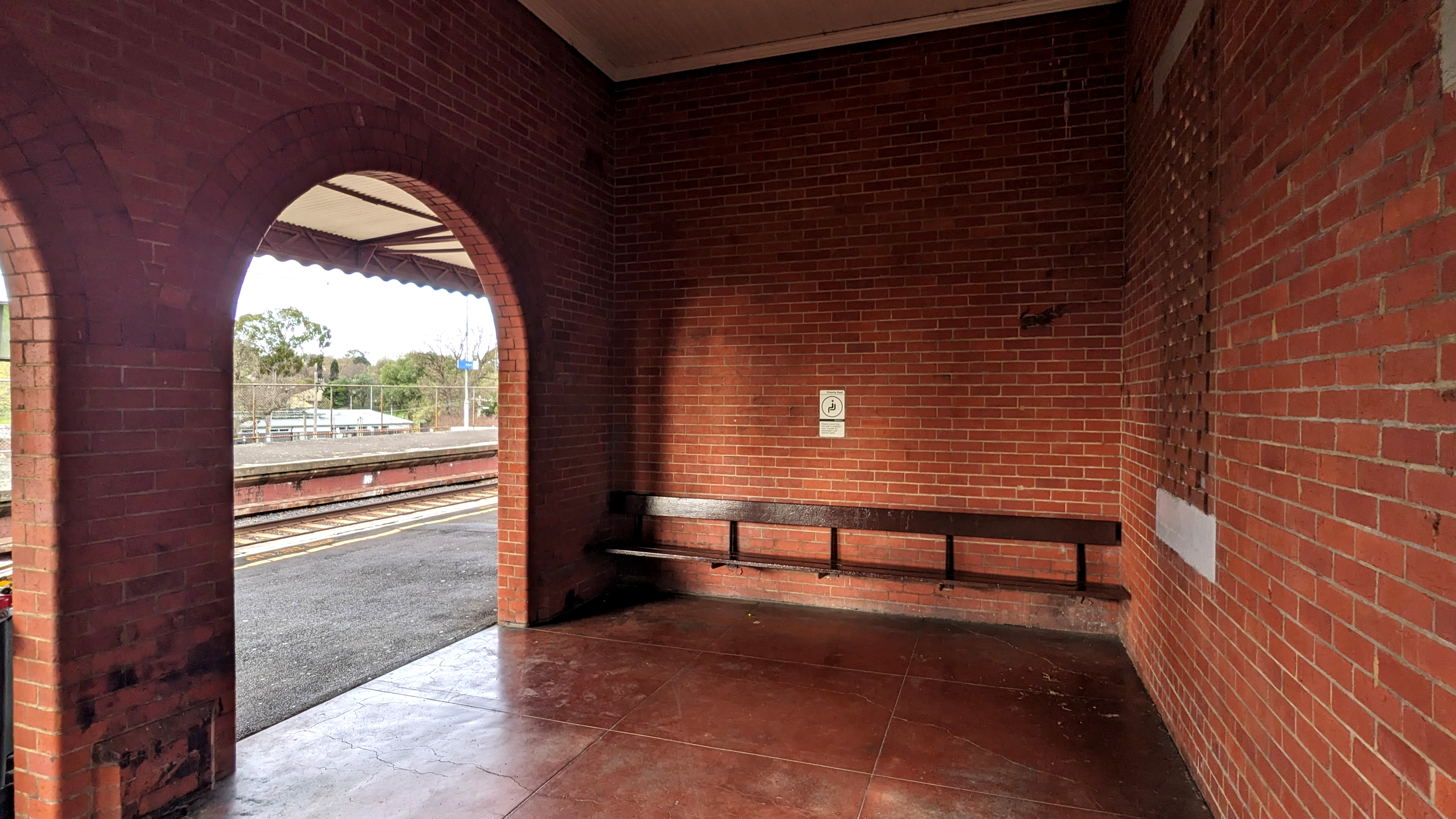
The waiting room at Auburn railway station, August 2024

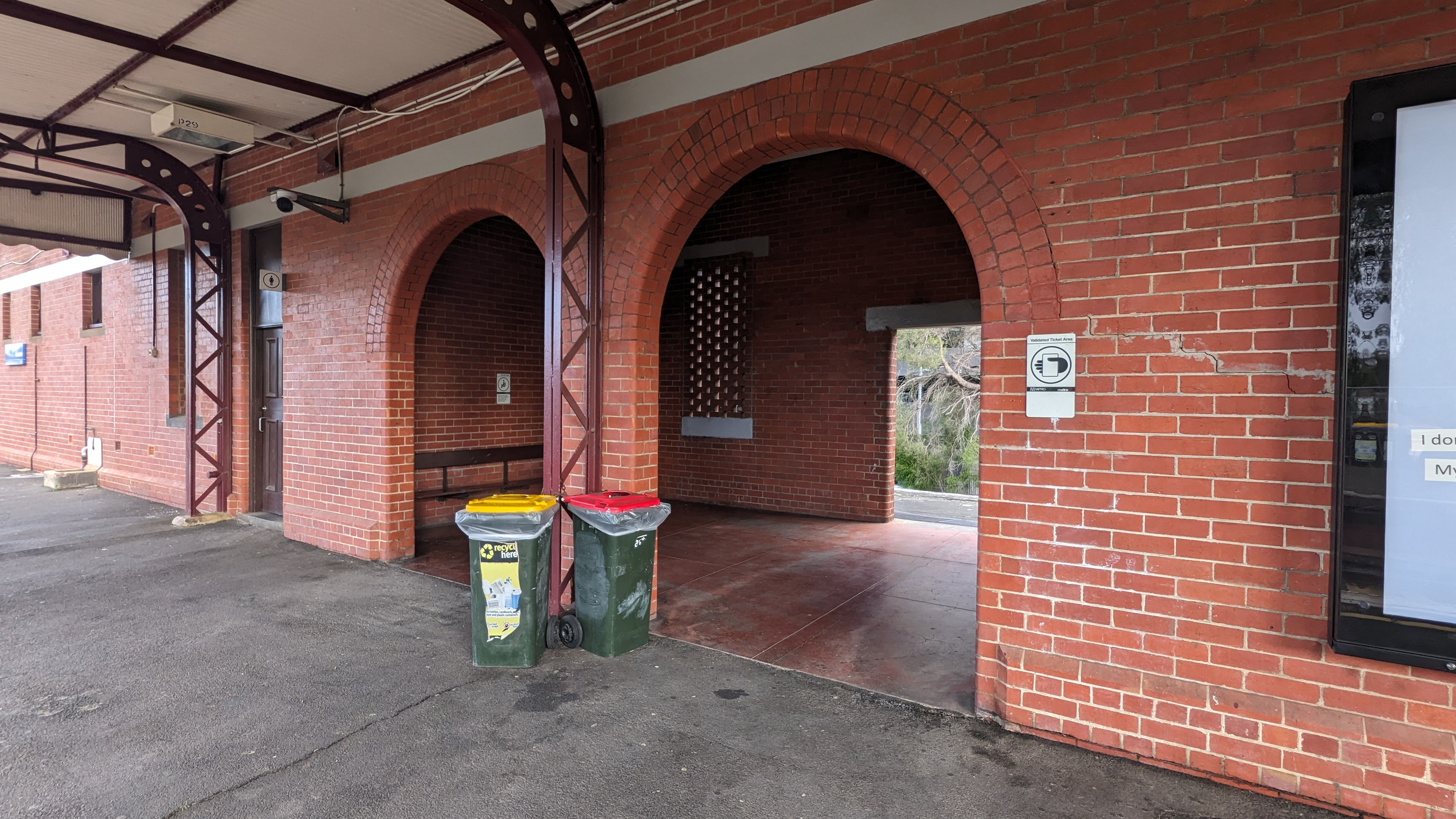
The exterior of the waiting room at Auburn railway station, August 2024

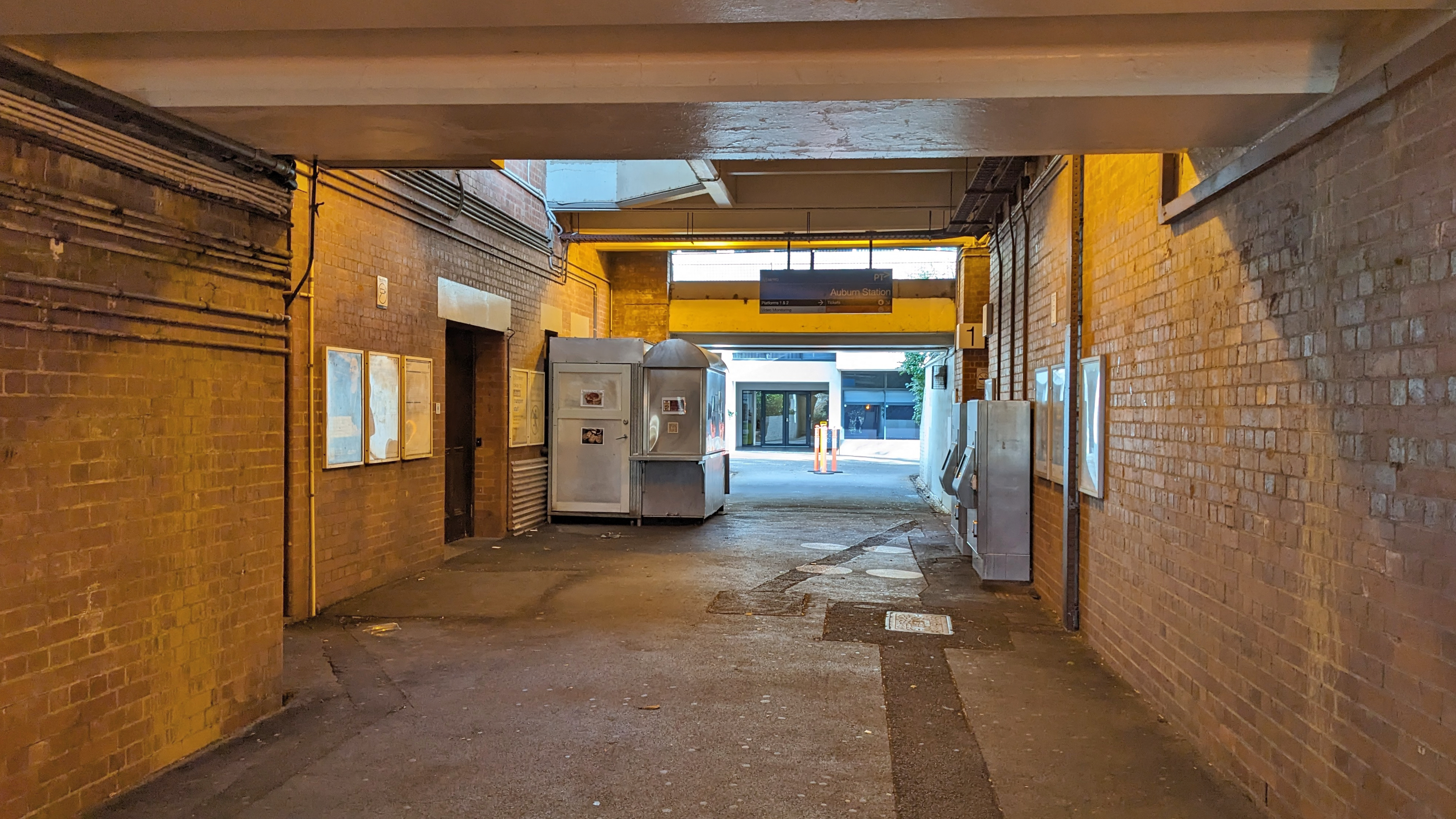
Pedestrian underpass looking south, August 2024

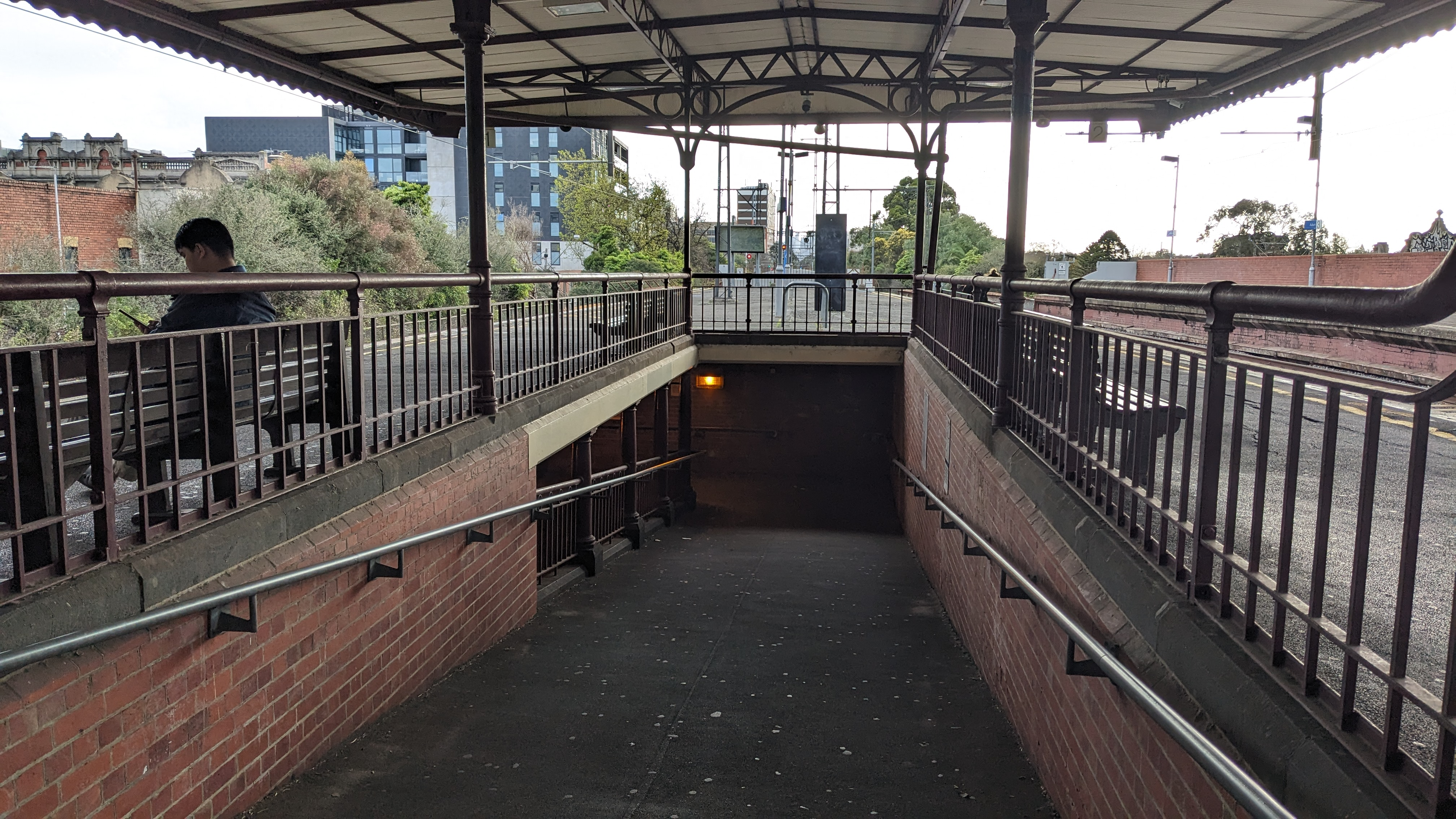
Ramp leading to platforms and underpass, August 2024
