= Alamein line =

Passenger rail service in metropolitan Melbourne, Victoria, Australia

Alamein

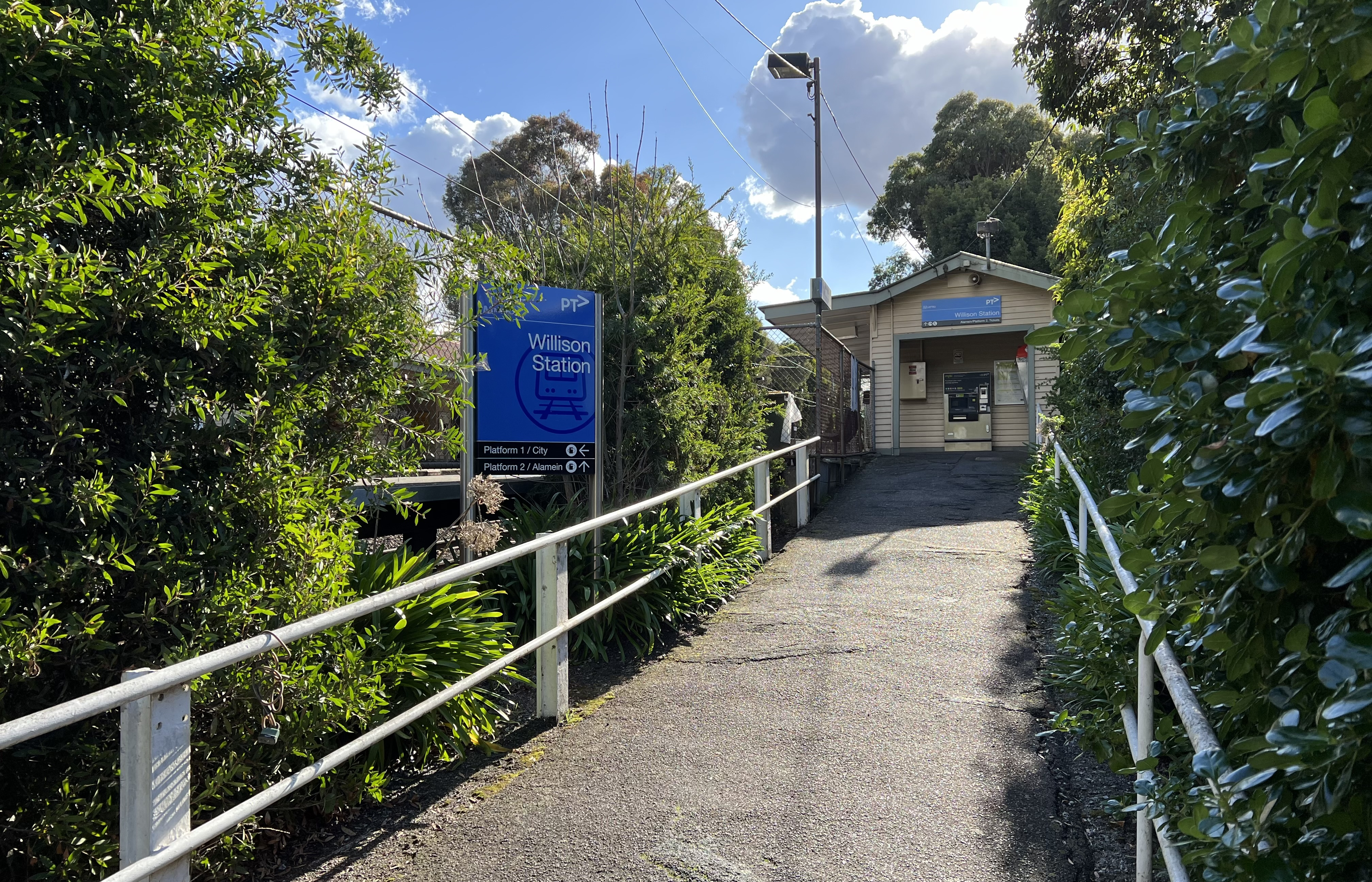
- Willison station on the Alamein line in June 2024

Overview
- Service type: Commuter rail
- System: Melbourne railway network
- Status: Operational
- Locale: Melbourne, Victoria, Australia
- Predecessor: Outer Circle (pre-1898); Flinders Street – Ashburton (1898–1924); Riversdale – Deepdene (1900–1925); Riversdale – East Kew (1925–1943); Flinders Street – Ashburton ^ (1924–1948)^ are electric services
- First service: 4 July 1898; 128 years ago
- Current operator: Metro Trains
- Former operators: Victorian Railways (VR) (1898–1974); VR as VicRail (1974–1983); MTA (The Met) (1983–1989); PTC (The Met) (1989–1998); Hillside Trains (1998–2000); Connex Melbourne (2000–2009)

Route
- Termini: Flinders Street; Alamein
- Stops: 18 (including City Loop stations)
- Distance travelled: 14.9 km (9.3 mi)
- Average journey time: 27 minutes (not via City Loop)
- Service frequency: 15–30 minutes weekdays peak; 15 minutes weekdays off-peak; 20 minutes weekend daytime; 30 minutes nights; 60 minutes early weekend mornings; Most weekday peak services operate through to the City. Shuttles to/from Camberwell station operate at all other times
- Lines used: Alamein, Outer Circle

Technical
- Rolling stock: X'Trapolis 100
- Track gauge: 1,600 mm (5 ft 3 in)
- Electrification: 1500 V DC overhead
- Track owner: VicTrack

The Alamein line is a commuter railway line on the Melbourne metropolitan railway network serving the city of Melbourne in Victoria, Australia. Operated by Metro Trains Melbourne, the line is coloured dark blue and is one of the four lines that constitute the Burnley group. It is the city's second shortest metropolitan railway line at 14.9 kilometres (9.3 mi). The line runs from Flinders Street station in central Melbourne to Alamein station in the east, serving 18 stations via Burnley, Camberwell, Riversdale, and Ashburton.

The line operates for approximately 19 hours a day (from approximately 5:00 am to around 12:00 am) with all-night service on Fridays and Saturdays. During peak hours, headways of up to 15 minutes are operated with services every 10–30 minutes during off-peak hours. Trains on the Alamein line run with one or two three-car formations of X'Trapolis 100 trainsets.

Sections of the Alamein line opened as early as 1898, with the line fully extended to Alamein by 1948. The Alamein line was originally part of the Outer Circle line which operated from 1890 until its closure in 1897. The line was built to connect Melbourne with the suburb towns of Camberwell and Ashburton, amongst others previously served by the Outer Circle line. Minor upgrades have occurred since its opening, including historical level crossing removal works and regular infrastructure upgrades.

== History ==
=== 19th century ===
What is now known as the Alamein line was opened as the Outer Circle Railway between 1890 and 1891. The segment still in use today was opened on 24 March 1890.

=== 20th century ===
The section from Camberwell to Ashburton was reopened 4 July 1898 and was operated by a steam locomotive and single carriage. The northern section, from Riversdale to Deepdene, was reopened on 14 May 1900, with a steam train, known locally as the Deepdene Dasher, running between Ashburton and Deepdene at ~90-minute intervals, connecting at East Camberwell on the lower platform. The Deepdene Dasher was the last passenger steam train in suburban Melbourne.

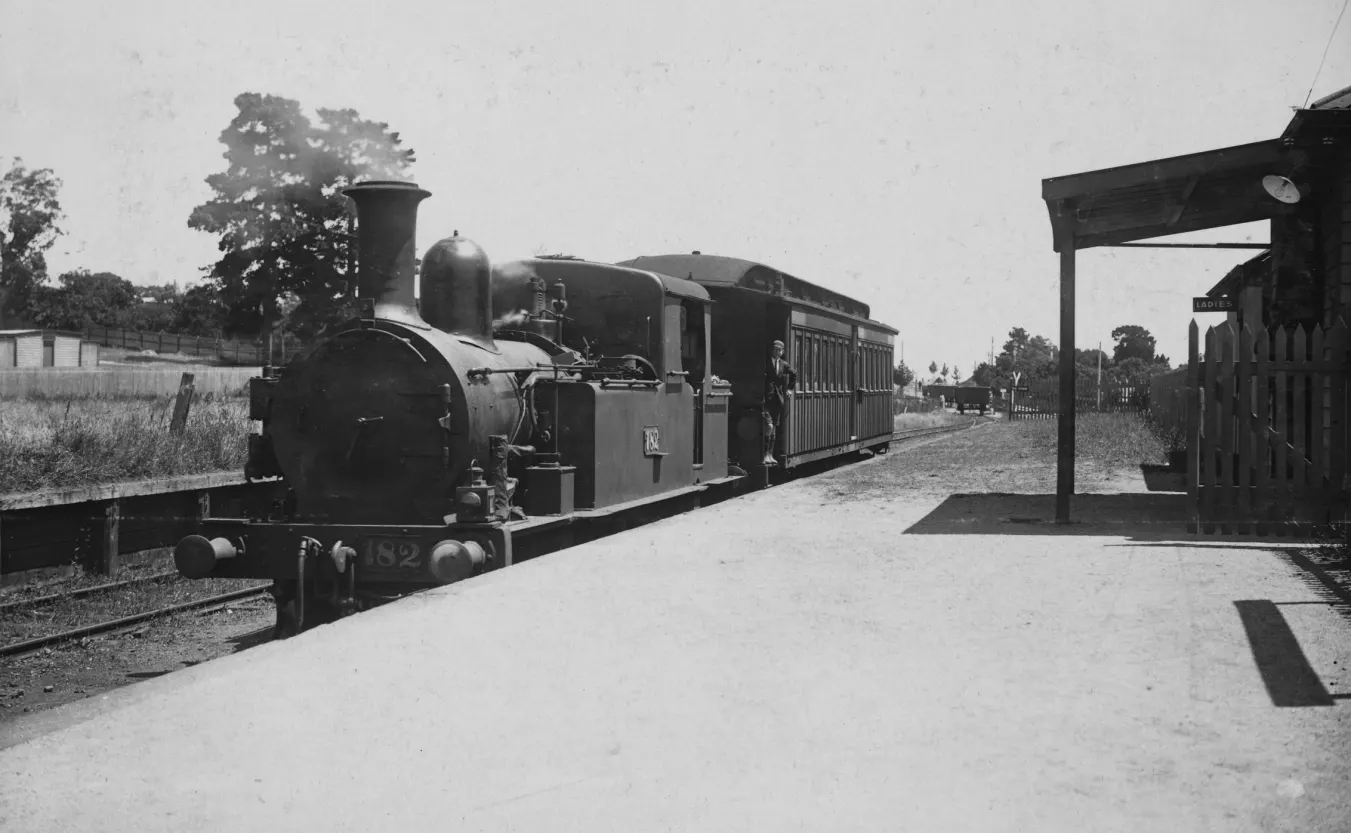
The Deepdene Dasher steam train at Deepdene station, 1926.

Electrification of the Melbourne suburban rail network commenced in the 1920s. In 1923, the Railway Commissioners decided not to electrify the line from Deepdene through Riversdale to Ashburton, due to insufficient traffic levels, but would keep the issue under review. Their position was partly reversed, with the Camberwell to Ashburton section later being included in the project. The last steam train ran to Ashburton on 29 October 1924 with electric train services commencing three days later in the form of shuttle trains from Camberwell to Ashburton, running every 40 minutes. On 15 August 1926, the last steam train the Deepdene Dasher ran, and was replaced by a pair of AEC railmotors coupled back to back. The Commissioners intended to electrify the line if the volume of traffic increased, but that did not occur, and the service was replaced by road bus on 10 October 1927. The electrified suburban service remains as today's Alamein line.

The line from Camberwell to the terminus was a single line with no crossing loops provided. The single train running operated a shuttle service along the line from Camberwell. Staff and Ticket safeworking was used, except between Camberwell and Riversdale where Lever Locking & Track Control was provided on 2 November 1924. Patronage and revenue on the line doubled after electrification, and on 12 October 1925 a 30 to 45 minute connecting service was provided to Ashburton. From 26 November 1928 two trains were provided at peak hours, with a new crossing loop provided at Hartwell. Through trains to the city at peak hour were provided from 17 May 1934. From 3 October 1938 the daytime off peak frequency was improved to 15 minutes. During this period trains would be stabled overnight on the remnant track south of the High Street bridge at Ashburton station.

On 28 June 1948, the line was extended to the new Housing Commission of Victoria estate of Alamein, with some services extended to the new terminus. After World War II, as part of Operation Phoenix, plans were drawn up to duplicate the line and provide a flying junction connection at Camberwell. It was authorised in 1951, but was delayed due to funding issues and other competing projects. The first 2.2-kilometre (1.4 mi) long stage opened on 7 November 1954, from Hartwell to Ashburton stations, followed by the duplication and automatic signalling of the 1.6 km (0.99 mi) stretch of line from Riversdale to Hartwell section on 31 July 1955. From 15 July 1955, Ashburton station ceased to be a regular terminus. However, reduced loan funds for railway construction during 1955 and 1956 delayed the rest of the works, with the overpass and new line at Camberwell finally commissioned on 29 November 1959. The last stage of the works had to wait until 8 November 1962 when automatic signalling was introduced between Hartwell and Ashburton, and the signal bay at Hartwell closed.

From 9 July 1972, the service was cut to every hour on Sundays, and from 10 December 1973 it was changed to 20 minutes during the day and every 40 minutes at night and on Saturday afternoons. Through trains to Flinders Street off-peak were provided from 20 January 1975 at a frequency of every 15 minutes Monday to Friday, with Box Hill trains running express from Camberwell.

In the 1980s, moves were made to close the line and replace it with a bus service, but these proposals were met with widespread opposition in what had been considered safe seats for the state government of the day. Under sustained opposition, a proposal was made to convert the line to light rail, but this seemed to have limited effect in quelling the backlash. A further suggestion was made to replace the track closest to East Camberwell with a 4th platform as the new terminus instead of Camberwell. This too was unpopular, and the line remained intact. The Kennett government of the early 1990s. made another attempt to close or convert the line. However, once again, there was a significant public outcry in the areas bordering it and the Alamein line has remained open and in operation well into the 21st century.

=== 21st century ===
The 2000s saw the introduction of the X'Trapolis 100 rolling stock on the line. The new stock features three doors per side on each carriage with the ability to accommodate up to 456 seated passengers in each six-car configuration.

== Network and operations ==
=== Services ===
Services on the Alamein line operate from approximately 5:00 am to around 12:00 am daily. In general, during peak hours, train frequency is 10–20 minutes while services during non-peak hours drop to 20–30 minutes throughout the entire route. Due to the limited number of passengers on the Alamein line, services operate as a shuttle in off-peak times to Camberwell instead of continuing into the central business district. On Friday and Saturday nights, services run 24 hours a day, with 60 minute frequencies available outside of normal operating hours.

Train services on the Alamein line are also subjected to maintenance and renewal works, usually on selected Fridays and Saturdays. Shuttle bus services are provided throughout the duration of works for affected commuters.

==== Stopping patterns ====
Legend – Station status

- ◼ Premium station – Station staffed from first to last train
- ◻ Host station – Usually staffed during morning peak, however this can vary for different stations on the network.

Legend – Stopping patterns
Some services do not operate via the City Loop

- ● – All trains stop
- ◐ – Some services do not stop
- ▲ – Only inbound trains stop
- ▼ – Only outbound trains stop
- | – Trains pass and do not stop

==== Guide ====
===== Weekdays =====
- Early morning, interpeak and night services to and from Alamein run only as a shuttle from Camberwell with all services stopping at all stations.

- During the morning and afternoon peaks services to and from Alamein run all the way to Flinders Street.

(Some services run to different stopping patterns during peak hours)

===== Weekends =====
- All services on weekends to and from Alamein run only as a shuttle from Camberwell with all services stopping at all stations.

===== Night Network =====
- All night network services to and from Alamein run only as a shuttle from Camberwell with all services stopping at all stations.

Alamein Services
Station	Zone	Local	Ltd Express	Riversdale	Shuttle
◼ Flinders Street	1	●	●	▼	
◼ Southern Cross	1	◐		◐	
◼ Flagstaff	1	◐		◐	
◼ Melbourne Central	1	◐		◐	
◼ Parliament	1	◐		◐	
◼ Richmond	1	●	●	▼	
East Richmond	1	◐	|	◐	
◼ Burnley	1	●	|	◐	
Hawthorn	1	●	|	◐	
◼ Glenferrie	1	●	◐	▼	
◻ Auburn	1	●	|	◐	
◼ Camberwell	1	●	●	▼	●
Riversdale	1	●	●	▼	●
Willison	1	●	●		●
Hartwell	1	●	●		●
Burwood	1	●	●		●
◼ Ashburton	1	●	●		●
Alamein	1	●	●		●

=== Operators ===
The Alamein line has had a total of 6 operators since its opening in 1898. The majority of operations throughout its history have been government run: from its first service in 1898 until the 1999 privatisation of Melbourne's rail network, four different government operators have run the line. These operators, Victorian Railways, the Metropolitan Transit Authority, the Public Transport Corporation and Hillside Trains have a combined operational length of 101 years. Hillside Trains was privatised in August 1999 and later rebranded as Connex Melbourne. Metro Trains Melbourne, the current private operator, then took over the operations in 2009. Both private operators have had a combined operational period of 27 years.

Past and present operators of the Alamein line:
Operator	Assumed operations	Ceased operations	Length of operations
Victorian Railways	1898	1983	85 years
Metropolitan Transit Authority	1983	1989	6 years
Public Transport Corporation	1989	1998	9 years
Hillside Trains (government operator)	1998	1999	1 years
Connex Melbourne	1999	2009	10 years
Metro Trains Melbourne	2009	incumbent	16 years (ongoing)

=== Route ===
Interactive map of the Alamein line in eastern Melbourne.

Alamein (physical track)

Overview
- Status: Operational with passenger services from Flinders Street to Alamein
- Owner: Victorian Railways (VR) (1890–1974); VR as VicRail (1974–1983); MTA (The Met) (1983–1989); PTC (The Met) (1989–1997); VicTrack (1997–Current)
- Locale: Melbourne, Victoria, Australia
- Termini: Flinders Street; Alamein
- Continues as: Outer Circle
- Connecting lines: All metropolitan, regional, and interstate
- Former connections: Kew; Outer Circle
- Stations: 18 current stations; 7 former stations

Service
- Services: Alamein

History
- Work began: 30 May 1890
- Opened: Princes Bridge to Richmond on 8 February 1859; Richmond to Pic-nic on 24 September 1860; Pic-nic to Hawthorn on 13 April 1861; Flinders Street to Princes Bridge on 18 December 1865; Hawthorn to Camberwell on 3 April 1882; Camberwell to Alamein* on 30 May 1890; Riversdale to East Kew on 24 March 1891
- Completed: 28 June 1948
- Reopen: Camberwell to Ashburton on 4 July 1898; Riversdale to Deepdene on 14 May 1900; Deepdene to East Kew on 11 February 1925; Ashburton to Alamein on 28 June 1948
- Electrified: Flinders Street to Camberwell on 19 December 1922; Camberwell to Ashburton on 30 October 1924; Ashburton to Alamein on 28 June 1948
- Closed: Riversdale to East Kew on 12 April 1893; Ashburton to Alamein* on 9 December 1895; Camberwell to Ashburton on 1 May 1897; Riversdale to East Kew on 7 September 1943

Technical
- Line length: 14.9 km (9.26 mi) + Riversdale to East Kew section
- Num of tracks: Twelve tracks: Flinders Street to Richmond; Four tracks: Richmond to Burnley; Triple track: Burnley to Camberwell; Double track: Camberwell to Ashburton; Single track: Ashburton to Alamein & Riversdale to East Kew
- Track gauge: 1,600 mm (5 ft 3 in)
- Electrification: 1500 V DC overhead
- Operating speed: 65 km/h (40 mph) – Electric
- Signalling: Automatic block signalling
- Maximum incline: 1 in 50 (2%)

The Alamein line forms a relatively straight route from the Melbourne central business district to its terminus in Alamein. The route is 14.9 kilometres (9.3 mi) long and is predominantly doubled-tracked, however between Flinders Street station and Richmond, the track is widened to 12 tracks, narrowing to 4 tracks between Richmond and Burnley, to 3 track between Burnley and Camberwell, and to two tracks after Camberwell . After Ashburton, the line is narrowed to a single track which remains till its terminus in Alamein. After departing from its terminus at Flinders Street, the Alamein line traverses gentle hills with moderately heavy earthworks for most of the line. Some sections of the line have been elevated or lowered into a cutting to eliminate level crossings. As of 2020, there are two level crossings remaining on the line with no current plans to remove them.

The line follows the same alignment as the Belgrave, Glen Waverley, and Lilydale lines with the Glen Waverley line splitting off after Burnley and the three remaining services continuing together through Camberwell. At Camberwell, the Alamein line continues on its southern alignment, whereas the Belgrave and Lilydale lines take an eastern alignment towards their final destinations. All of the rail line goes through built-up suburbs towards its terminus in Alamein.

=== Stations ===
The line serves 18 stations across 15 kilometres (9.3 mi) of track. The stations are a mix of elevated, lowered, underground, and ground-level designs. Underground stations are present only in the City Loop, with the majority of elevated and lowered stations being constructed as part of level crossing removals.

Station	Accessibility	Opened	Terrain	Train connections	Other connections
Flinders Street	Yes—step free access	1854	Lowered	13 connections: * Belgrave line; Craigieburn line; Flemington Racecourse line; Frankston line; Gippsland line; Glen Waverley line; Hurstbridge line; Lilydale line; Mernda line; Sandringham line; Upfield line; Werribee line; Williamstown line	Trams Buses
Southern Cross	Yes—step free access	1859	Ground level	25 connections: * Albury line; Ararat line; Ballarat line; Belgrave line; Bendigo line; Craigieburn line; Echuca line; Flemington Racecourse line; Frankston line; Geelong line; Gippsland line; Glen Waverley line; Hurstbridge line; Lilydale line; Maryborough line; Mernda line; NSW TrainLink Southern; Seymour line; Shepparton line; Swan Hill line; The Overland; Upfield line; Warrnambool line; Werribee line; Williamstown line	Trams Buses Coaches SkyBus
Flagstaff	Yes—step free access	1985	Underground	8 connections: * Belgrave line; Craigieburn line; Frankston line; Glen Waverley line; Hurstbridge line; Lilydale line; Mernda line; Upfield line	Trams
Melbourne Central	Yes—step free access	1981	Underground	8 connections: * Belgrave line; Craigieburn line; Frankston line; Glen Waverley line; Hurstbridge line; Lilydale line; Mernda line; Upfield line	Trams Buses
Parliament	Yes—step free access	1983	Underground	8 connections: * Belgrave line; Craigieburn line; Frankston line; Glen Waverley line; Hurstbridge line; Lilydale line; Mernda line; Upfield line	Trams
Richmond	No—steep ramp	1859	Elevated	6 connections: * Belgrave line; Frankston line; Gippsland line; Glen Waverley line; Lilydale line; Sandringham line	Trams Buses
East Richmond	Yes—step free access	1860	Ground level	3 connections: Belgrave line; Glen Waverley line; Lilydale line	Trams
Burnley	No—steep ramp	1880	Ground level	3 connections: Belgrave line; Glen Waverley line; Lilydale line	Trams
Hawthorn	No—steep ramp	1861	Ground level	2 connections: Belgrave line; Lilydale line	Trams Buses
Glenferrie	No—steep ramp	1882	Elevated	2 connections: Belgrave line; Lilydale line	Trams
Auburn	No—steep ramp	1882	Ground level	2 connections: Belgrave line; Lilydale line	Buses
Camberwell	No—steep ramp	1882	Lowered	2 connections: Belgrave line; Lilydale line	Trams Buses
Riversdale	No—steep ramp	1890	Ground level		Trams Buses
Willison	No—steep ramp	1908	Ground level		
Hartwell	No—steep ramp	1906	Ground level		
Burwood	No—steep ramp	1890	Ground level		Trams
Ashburton	Yes—step free access	1890	Ground level		Buses
Alamein	Yes—step free access	1948	Ground level		

Station histories
Station	Opened	Closed	Age	Notes
Parliament	22 January 1983		43 years	
Melbourne Central	26 January 1981		45 years	Formerly Museum
Flagstaff	27 May 1985		41 years	
Southern Cross	17 January 1859		167 years	Formerly Batman's Hill; Formerly Spencer Street
Flinders Street	12 September 1854		172 years	Formerly Melbourne Terminus
Princes Bridge	8 February 1859	1 October 1866	7 years	
Princes Bridge	2 April 1879	30 June 1980	101 years	
Botanic Gardens	2 March 1859	c. April 1862	Approx. 3 years	
Punt Road	8 February 1859	12 December 1859	10 months	Replaced by Swan Street (200m further along line)
Richmond	12 December 1859		166 years	Formerly Swan Street
East Richmond	24 September 1860		166 years	Formerly Church Street
Burnley	1 May 1880		146 years	Formerly Burnley Street
Pic Nic	24 September 1860	6 October 1895	35 years	
Hawthorn	13 April 1861		165 years	
Glenferrie	3 April 1882		144 years	Formerly Glenferrie Road
Auburn	3 April 1882		144 years	Formerly Auburn Road
Camberwell	3 April 1882		144 years	
East Kew	24 March 1891	12 April 1893	24 months	As part of the Outer Circle line
East Kew	14 May 1900	6 September 1943	43 years	Freight service
Deepdene	24 March 1891	12 April 1893	24 months	As part of the Outer Circle line
Deepdene	14 May 1900	9 October 1927	27 years	
Roystead	14 May 1900	9 October 1927	27 years	Formerly Stanley; Formerly Balwyn
Shenley	24 March 1891	12 April 1893	24 months	As part of the Outer Circle line
Shenley	14 May 1900	9 October 1927	27 years	
East Camberwell	14 May 1900	9 October 1927	27 years	Lower level
Riversdale	30 May 1890	1 May 1897	6 years	As part of the Outer Circle line
Riversdale	4 July 1898		128 years	
Willison	8 June 1908		118 years	Formerly Golf Links
Hartwell	7 May 1906		120 years	Formerly Hartwell Hill
Burwood	30 May 1890	1 May 1897	6 years	As part of the Outer Circle line; Formerly Hartwell
Burwood	4 July 1898		128 years	Formerly Hartwell
Ashburton	30 May 1890	1 May 1897	6 years	As part of the Outer Circle line; Formerly Norwood
Ashburton	4 July 1898		128 years	
Alamein	28 June 1948		78 years	

== Infrastructure ==
=== Rolling stock ===
The Alamein line uses X'Trapolis 100 electric multiple unit (EMU) trains operating in a one or two three-car configuration, with three doors per side on each carriage and can accommodate of up to 456 seated passengers in each six-car configuration. The trains were originally built between 2002 and 2004 as well as between 2009 and 2020 with a total of 212 three-car sets constructed. The trains are shared with 7 other metropolitan train lines and have been in service since 2003.

Alongside the passenger trains, Alamein line tracks and equipment are maintained by a fleet of engineering trains. The four types of engineering trains are: the shunting train; designed for moving trains along non-electrified corridors and for transporting other maintenance locomotives, for track evaluation; designed for evaluating track and its condition, the overhead inspection train; designed for overhead wiring inspection, and the infrastructure evaluation carriage designed for general infrastructure evaluation. Most of these trains are repurposed locomotives previously used by V/Line, Metro Trains, and the Southern Shorthaul Railroad.

==== Historic operations ====
Before Xtrapolis trains took over operations of the Burnley group, the line generally operated with a three-car Comeng set. These may have been preferred over Hitachi stock because the Comengs as introduced had a feature to allow single-person operation with the trailing two carriages remaining locked and unlit; though two- and later three-car Hitachi sets did operate on higher traffic weekends. Prior to the introduction of the Comeng fleet the line was generally worked by Tait wooden EMUs in consists of anything from one to seven carriages, depending on the time of day and day of week. These were replaced by the Comengs in November 1984.

===== 1924 =====
The December 1924 working time table outlining the inaugural electric service on the Ashburton line shows a weekday service starting at 5:20 am from Ashburton, with 32 return trips and finishing with the 11:48 pm from Camberwell, terminating Ashburton 11:58 pm.

At the time the line was single track the whole way, well before the crossing loop at Hartwell was made available. A second track was electrified at Riversdale but the turnouts each end were not interlocked, so passenger trains could not pass in opposite directions there without special arrangements; McLean says it "NEVER" happened, though an electric passenger train was sighted in the loop track once. Services were operated by a single ABM double-ended car, occasionally with a driving trailer attached. Goods trains were run by steam engines, with a 1 am departure from Camberwell, 3 am from Riversdale shunting at Ashburton 3:30 am to 4 am, then departing Riversdale at 5 am on the return trip, thus clearing the line before the start of passenger service. At the time Burwood had a dead-end siding facing Up trains and Ashburton had a dead-end siding connected to the engine run-around track. However, the need to run around the goods train at Ashburton means that, by default, the motor carriage stabled at Ashburton could not have been parked in either the platform or loop track and so must have been stabled south of the High Street bridge.

From February 1925 the Ashburton signalman was withdrawn and replaced by Porters who would sell tickets, while train Guards were responsible for signalling.

A short-lived experiment was run from then to 23 June 1925, with one train working both the East Kew and Ashburton goods service as a single trip. To achieve this the train would run from Camberwell at around 12 30am to Riversdale, reversing and heading north, then running south from Riversdale to Ashburton (4:35 am to around 5 am) and back to Camberwell. This required complex shunting and administration at Ashburton. The previous night's last suburban train would have to shunt beyond the High Street bridge at Ashburton before telegraphing a "Line Clear" report to Riversdale. The goods train arriving at Ashburton would have to complete its run-around and some shunting before the suburban train could depart towards Riversdale, because the north end turnout was locked unless the Train Staff was present and the suburban train needed that as authorisation to run to, and then back from, Riversdale.

From around July 1925 guards, who were responsible for selling tickets on the train for unstaffed stations, were supposed to move the portable ticket cabinet from the trailing D van to the ABM car when not riding in the rear vehicle, as specially authorised. Whether or not that actually happened is not confirmed; but it is known that the single car ABM quite often had tail discs displayed on both ends, so at least some procedures were not followed to the letter.

===== 1928 =====
From 18 November 1928 a second track was provided at Hartwell, forming a crossing loop. This used weighted hand levers to work the turnouts as a precursor to modern trailable point machines, and enabled trains to pass there instead of being limited to only one train at a time between Riversdale and Ashburton. Initially the platform was only 225 ft (69 m) long, enough for four-carriage trains, but seven-car trains were introduced around June 1934; with several return trips from Flinders Street being made during peak periods; the local shuttle set was stabled at Camberwell to keep it out of the way while through services were running. At this time Saturdays were considered a half work-day, so there were six morning peak services, five evening peak and one midday peak service periods per week, with a lesser service on Sundays. Between the daily peaks, and overnight, a seven-car suburban train would stable at the down end of Ashburton, which means that the overhead wire there must have extended at least 620 ft (189 m) beyond the station to hold the nine required carriages; the line beyond High Street was at least 1,340 ft (408 m) long (more than halfway to the later Alamein station). It is not known whether or not that section was wired, but a scotch block was provided at the 620 ft mark.

To accommodate night demand by Friday-only late night shoppers, for a brief period between November 1935 and September 1936 the seven-car set stabled at Ashburton would split on arrival with three cars stabled, and four used to run the 9:28 pm Up and 9:44 pm Down trips to Camberwell, while the two-car ABM-D set ran the 9:11 pm Up and 9:26 pm Down trips, with crossing moves performed at Hartwell resulting in a slightly different schedule. However, this meant the two-car set would terminate at Ashburton while the four-car set was still at Camberwell; to resolve this the two-car set made an additional empty trip to and from Hartwell, leaving Ashburton at 9:44 pm, being passed by the 9:44 pm from Camberwell, and returning by 9:57 pm.

Recollections of a local who lived on the line from 1939 to 1978 indicate that Riversdale yard was rarely used, though there were two sidings at the Down end serving the City of Camberwell's municipal yard. In the late 1940s and early 1950s there were weekly steam-hauled works trains, running to supply material for duplication works. These trains used a variety of medium-sized steam locomotives, always running with the funnel at the down end, and returning to Melbourne tender-first. During these occupations Hartwell signal box had to be staffed, but the signalman didn't have much else to do and would often sleep in the building through their shift. The duplication works required removal of the goods siding at Burwood.

The trains that ran to and from the city in peak hours often included the paired AM and M Swingdoor motor units that also operated "E Trains", hauling country carriages to Lilydale and Frankston where those trains would then split and continue under steam power to Healesville and Warburton, and Stony Point and Mornington, respectively. Later, the trains used on the Alamein line would be a mix of Swingdoor and Tait stock, often a Swingdoor double-ended motor plus a Tait driving trailer.

===== 1958 =====
The 1958 working time table shows three train sets (implied but not explicitly stated as two carriages each, either Swingdoor or Tait stock) starting from Ashburton siding each weekday morning. The first of these would run the early morning, interpeak and evening services, stabling at Camberwell during peak hours. The second ran to Flinders Street and back, then stabled at Jolimont sidings, and was replaced in the afternoon peak. The third set was used for interpeak shuttle services; sets one and three combined to form a four-carriage set at about 4:30 pm from Camberwell, with set three detaching at Ashburton and stabling while set one continued to Alamein. Additional services in the morning and evening peaks were operated by trains through-routed from the rest of the network, such as Lilydale and Ferntree Gully, Fawkner and St Albans. The Saturday pattern was similar, with two sets running shuttles between Camberwell and Alamein and a third set starting from Ashburton then mixing with the rest of the network, being replaced late at night; and a handful of trips by other sets primarily in the early morning, after midday and mid-evening. On Sundays only one train set operated, starting from Ashburton with a reduced service of only 25 return Camberwell-Alamein shuttles, and probably using just one of the three sets of two carriages.

===== 1984 =====
By 1984 the typical weekend operation of the Alamein line was based on a four-car Tait train, running from Flinders Street late on the prior Friday night. This train was set up as a consist of alternating driving motor and driving trailer carriages, one of the two motors being double-ended, and it would run the Friday evening service then stable at Ashburton overnight. On Saturday the four carriages would split into two two-carriage sets to provide low capacity but (relatively) high frequency shuttle services between Camberwell and Alamein. After about 2 pm the second pair would run express from Camberwell to Ashburton then stable in the siding, leaving only two carriages for the afternoon service. On Sundays one of the two-car sets would leave Ashburton and run to Alamein, drop off the second carriage at the end of the line, then run shuttle trips as a single carriage for the rest of the day. Use of the double-ended motor car for Sunday single carriage working had been instituted in 1968, allowing the guard to sell tickets on board the train and thus avoid needing to staff intermediate stations (Ashburton excepted, for signalling purposes). The discarded trailer would be reattached on arrival back to Alamein just after midnight on Monday morning, then hauled back to Ashburton siding to restore the four-carriage set. In 1984, common carriages on the line were (1)470M and (1)471M, (Note: Various Tait motor cars were renumbered in the mid 1980s by adding a "1" prefix, to clear space for Comeng trains then being delivered.) the double-ended motors, 202D, 257D or 265D as the driving trailers, and 1459M, (1)483M or 495M as single-ended driving motors. These carriages were often used during the week as part of a six-carriage train, typically interworked with Sandringham line rosters, including regular trailers like 435T and alternately gas-lit trailer 92G.

=== Accessibility ===
In compliance with the Disability Discrimination Act of 1992, all stations that are new-built or rebuilt are fully accessible and comply with these guidelines. Less than half of stations on the line are fully accessible as they haven't been upgraded to meet these guidelines. These stations do feature ramps, however, they have a gradient greater than 1 in 14. Stations that are fully accessible feature ramps that have a gradient less than 1 in 14, have at-grade paths, or feature lifts. These stations typically also feature tactile boarding indicators, independent boarding ramps, wheelchair accessible myki barriers, hearing loops, and widened paths.

Individual station upgrade projects have helped improve station accessibility on the line, however, only 40% of stations on the line are fully wheelchair accessible.

=== Signalling ===
The Alamein line uses three-position signalling, which is used across the Melbourne train network. Three position signalling was first introduced on the line in 1919, with the final section to Ashburton converted to the new type of signalling in 1962. Since Ashburton and Alamein stations are very close to each other, the single track between the two stations uses station limits working.
