= Ashburton railway station, Melbourne =

Railway station in Melbourne, Australia

Ashburton
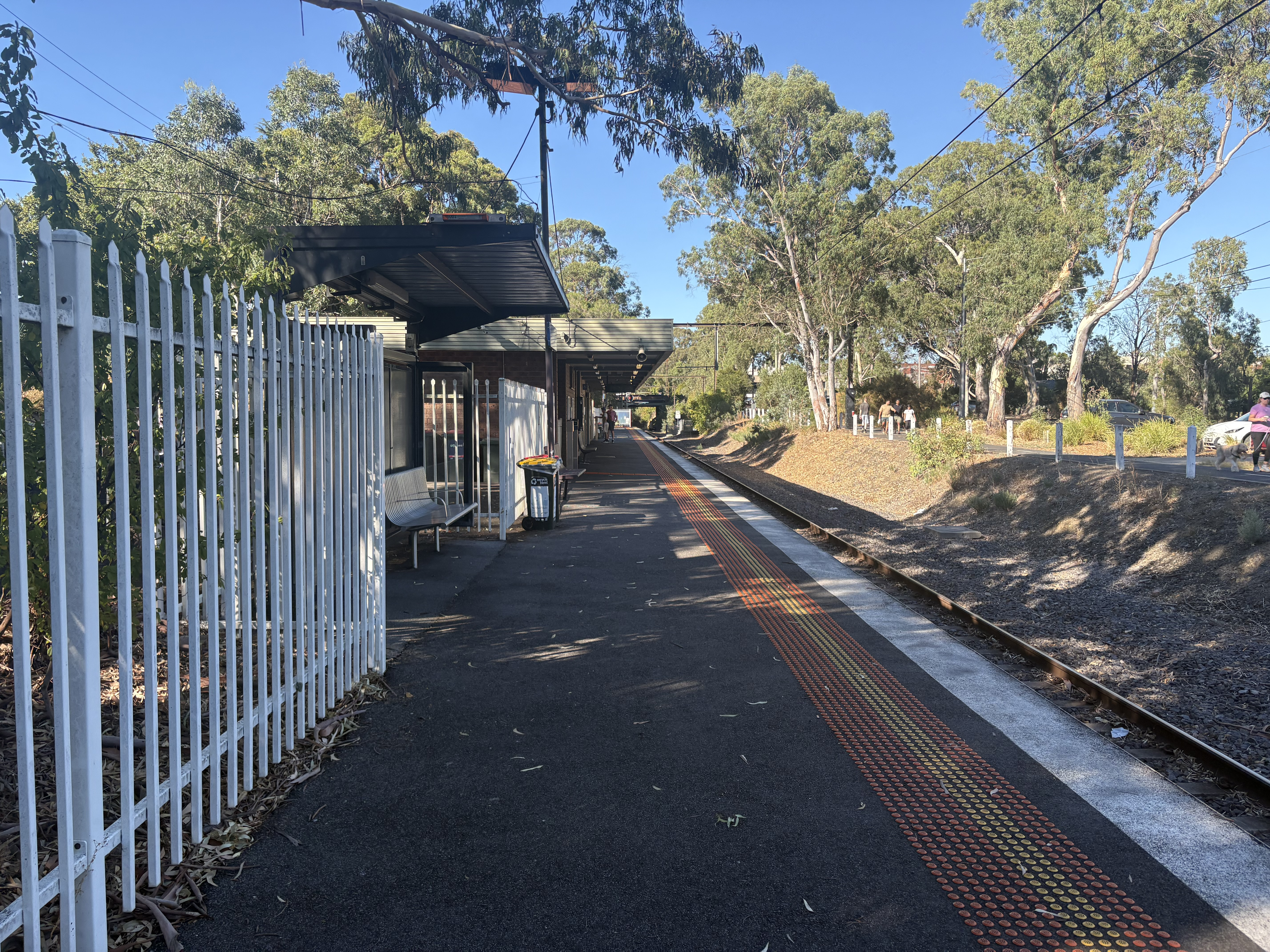
- Southbound view from the station platform, March 2025

General information
- Location: Welfare Parade, Ashburton, Victoria 3147; City of Boroondara; Australia
- Coordinates: 37°51′43″S 145°04′53″E
- System: PTV commuter rail station
- Owner: VicTrack
- Operator: Metro Trains
- Line: Alamein
- Distance: 15.39 kilometres from Southern Cross
- Platforms: 1
- Tracks: 1
- Connections: Bus

Construction
- Structure type: Ground
- Parking: 170
- Cycle facilities: Yes
- Accessible: Yes—step free access

Other information
- Status: Operational, premium station
- Station code: ASH
- Fare zone: Myki zone 1
- Website: Public Transport Victoria

History
- Opened: 30 May 1890; 136 years ago
- Electrified: October 1924 (1500 V DC overhead)
- Former names: Norwood (1890)

Passengers
- 2005–2006: 266,850
- 2006–2007: 283,793 ▲6.34%
- 2007–2008: 294,485 ▲3.76%
- 2008–2009: 295,785 ▲0.44%
- 2009–2010: 303,425 ▲2.58%
- 2010–2011: 307,057 ▲1.19%
- 2011–2012: 286,560 ▼6.67%
- 2012–2013: Not measured
- 2013–2014: 289,348 ▲0.97%
- 2014–2015: 284,345 ▼1.72%
- 2015–2016: 313,000 ▲10.07%
- 2016–2017: 295,769 ▼5.5%
- 2017–2018: 291,198 ▼1.54%
- 2018–2019: 299,050 ▲2.69%
- 2019–2020: 239,200 ▼20.01%
- 2020–2021: 100,200 ▼58.11%
- 2021–2022: 109,450 ▲9.23%
- 2022–2023: 168,550 ▲53.99%
- 2023–2024: 194,250 ▲15.25%
- 2024–2025: 201,950 ▲3.96%

Services
Preceding station	Metro Trains	Following station
Burwood towards Flinders Street	Alamein line Peak only	Alamein Terminus
Burwood towards Camberwell	Alamein line Shuttle service	Alamein Terminus
Former services
Preceding station	Disused railways	Following station
Burwood towards Fairfield	Continued beyond Alamein as the Outer Circle line	Waverley Road towards Oakleigh
	List of closed railway stations in Melbourne	
Track layout
Location

Ashburton station is railway station operated by Metro Trains Melbourne on the Alamein line, which is part of the Melbourne rail network. It serves the eastern suburb of Ashburton, in Melbourne, Victoria, Australia. Ashburton station is a ground level premium station, featuring one side platform. It opened on 30 May 1890.

Initially opened as Norwood, the station was given its current name of Ashburton on 12 December 1890. Situated immediately north of the station, the double track becomes single for the rest of the section to Alamein.

== History ==
Ashburton station opened on 30 May 1890, and was on the first section of the Outer Circle line. Like the suburb itself, the station was named after Ashburton Terrace in Cork, Ireland, where councillor E. Dillon, who suggested the name, had previously lived.

By 1893, the northern half of the Outer Circle line had been closed and, on 9 December 1895, the line beyond Ashburton, connecting with Oakleigh was closed as well. For a short period, that left the line from Camberwell to Ashburton as the only remaining stretch of the Outer Circle line.

On 1 May 1897, Ashburton closed, along with the line from Camberwell. After an outcry from the local community, that section of the line reopened on 4 July 1898, becoming the Ashburton line once again. The line was electrified on 30 October 1924 but, in the years leading up to that, it was served by the popularly-named Deepdene Dasher, which ran a shuttle between Ashburton and Deepdene, and usually consisted of an F-Class engine and one or two American-type carriages. When the track was extended 600 metres to a new terminus at Alamein, on 28 June 1948, the Ashburton line became the Alamein line.

In 1977, a signal panel was provided in the station building. The Train Staff and Ticket safeworking system to Alamein was also abolished in that year.

A siding is located at the Flinders Street (up) end of the station. In July 1989, timetabled use of the siding ended, due to the vandalising of trains stabled there. However, from time to time, maintenance trains use the siding during track works.

On 1 February 1996, Ashburton was upgraded to a premium station. Also occurring in that year, the station was the first on the metropolitan railway system where the former Metcard ticketing system was trialled.

== Platforms and services ==
Ashburton has one platform and is served by Alamein line trains.

Ashburton platform arrangement
Platform	Line	Destination	Via	Service Type	Notes	Source
1	Alamein line	Camberwell, Alamein		All stations	Offpeak and weekends.	
1	Alamein line	Flinders Street, Alamein	City Loop	All stations and limited express services	See City Loop for operating patterns Weekday peaks only.	

== Transport links ==
Ventura Bus Lines operates one bus route via Ashburton station, under contract to Public Transport Victoria:

- 734 : Glen Iris station – Glen Waverley station
