= Alamein railway station =

Railway station in Ashburton, Melbourne, Victoria, Australia

Alamein
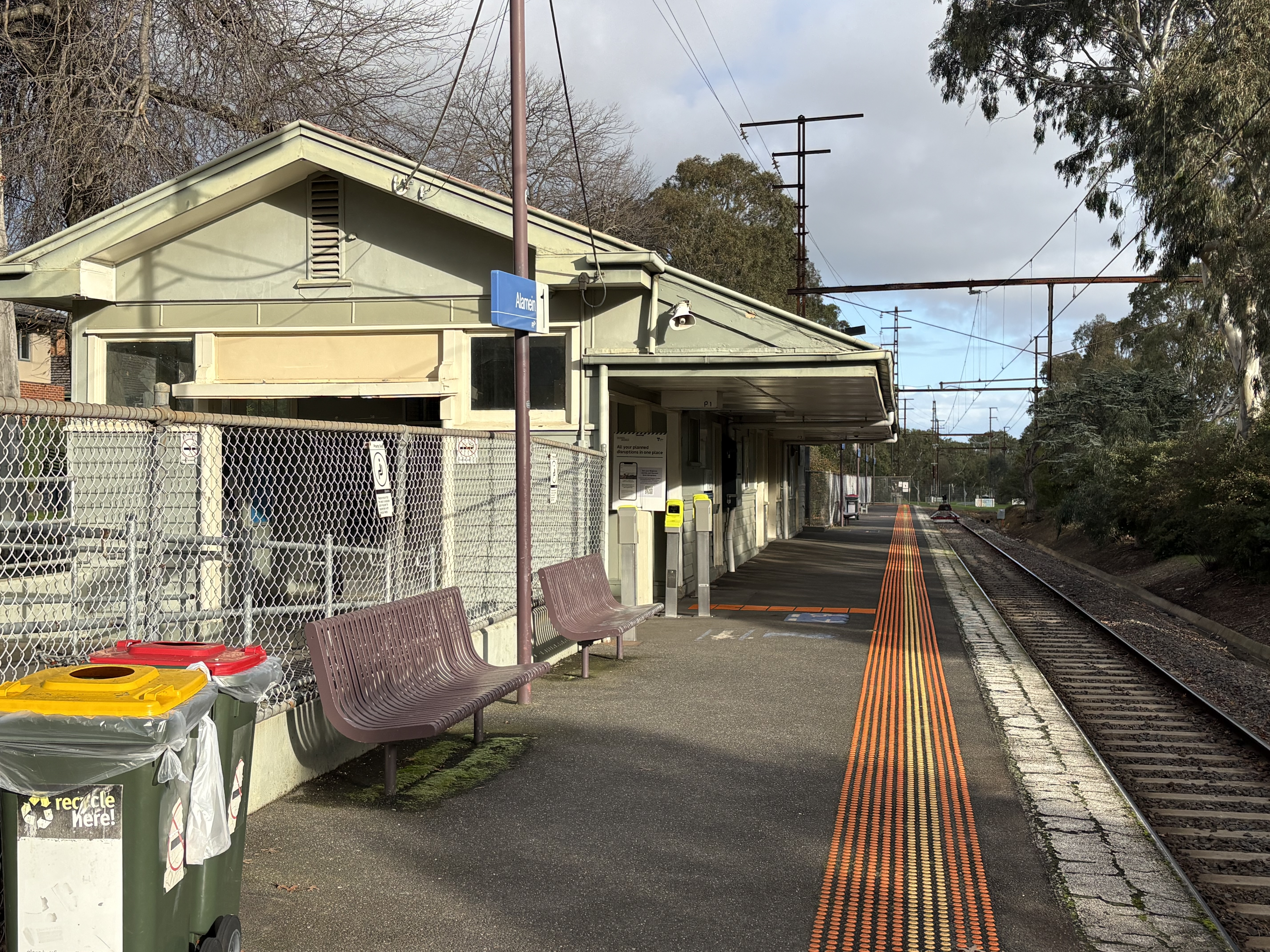
- Overview of the platform at Alamein, June 2026

General information
- Location: Ashburn Grove, Ashburton, Victoria 3147; City of Boroondara; Australia
- Coordinates: 37°52′06″S 145°04′47″E
- System: PTV commuter rail station
- Owner: VicTrack
- Operator: Metro Trains
- Line: Alamein
- Distance: 16.12 km (10.02 mi) from Southern Cross
- Platforms: 1
- Tracks: 1

Construction
- Structure type: Ground
- Cycle facilities: Yes
- Accessible: Yes—step free access

Other information
- Status: Operational, unstaffed
- Station code: ALM
- Fare zone: Myki zone 1
- Website: Public Transport Victoria

History
- Opened: 28 June 1948; 78 years ago
- Electrified: June 1948 (1500 V DC overhead)

Passengers
- 2005–2006: 135,678
- 2006–2007: 164,563 ▲21.28%
- 2007–2008: 175,432 ▲6.6%
- 2008–2009: 176,067 ▲0.36%
- 2009–2010: 169,994 ▼3.44%
- 2010–2011: 175,858 ▲3.44%
- 2011–2012: 153,094 ▼12.94%
- 2012–2013: Not measured
- 2013–2014: 150,090 ▼1.96%
- 2014–2015: 138,669 ▼7.6%
- 2015–2016: 148,024 ▲6.74%
- 2016–2017: 133,093 ▼10.08%
- 2017–2018: 138,439 ▲4.01%
- 2018–2019: 145,700 ▲5.24%
- 2019–2020: 113,450 ▼22.13%
- 2020–2021: 46,350 ▼59.14%
- 2021–2022: 54,200 ▲16.93%
- 2022–2023: 78,100 ▲44.09%
- 2023–2024: 91,500 ▲17.16%
- 2024–2025: 96,200 ▲5.14%

Services
Preceding station	Metro Trains	Following station
Ashburton towards Camberwell or Flinders Street	Alamein line	Terminus
Track layout
Location

Alamein station is a railway station operated by Metro Trains Melbourne and the terminus of the Alamein line, which is part of the Melbourne rail network. It serves the eastern Melbourne suburb of Ashburton in Victoria, Australia. Alamein is a ground-level unstaffed station, featuring one side platform. It opened on 28 June 1948.

== History ==
Alamein station opened on 28 June 1948, and was the last station to be built on what is now the line of the same name. It opened on the reservation of the former Outer Circle line. The section on which Alamein is now located was closed to all traffic in 1895.

The station served a new Housing Commission estate that had been constructed for people who were displaced after World War II. The station still bears the name of the estate, which in turn had been named after the World War II battlefield in North Africa. It opened without much fanfare; there was no official ceremony from the Victorian Railways, local politicians or local councillors. Only 103 tickets were sold up to 10:30 a.m. on the first day of operations.

On 31 December 1956, an incident involving Swing Door driving trailer 10D and motor 155ABM occurred at the station after 10D, which was the leading car of the 16:29 service from Camberwell, overshot the platform and crashed into a timber buffer at the down end of the platform. 10D derailed in the incident as it pushed down on the buffer, before lifting upwards and coming to a stop leaning on an angle and a few metres away from a stanchion. There were no injuries reported from the fifteen people in 10D. At the time, the cause of the crash was due to faulty brakes.

During the 2011/2012 financial year, it was the 8th least used station on Melbourne's metropolitan network, with 153,000 passenger movements.

== Platforms and services ==
Alamein has one platform. It is serviced by Metro Trains' Alamein line services.

Alamein platform arrangement
Platform	Line	Destination	Via	Service Type	Notes	Source
1	Alamein line '	Camberwell		All stations	Offpeak and weekends.	
1	Alamein line '	Flinders Street	City Loop	All stations and limited express services	See City Loop for operating patterns Weekday peaks only.	

== Transport links ==
The Outer Circle Trail for cyclists and walkers continues along the Outer Circle alignment after Alamein as far as Gardiners Creek and the Malvern Valley Public Golf Course. It then connects with the Gardiners Creek Trail and a path to East Malvern.
