= Timeline of trams in Melbourne =

Operation
- Locale: Melbourne, Victoria, Australia

Statistics
Horse tram era: 1884–circa 1890
- Status: Closed / predecessor
- Operator: Various
Cable tram era: 1885–mid-1920s to 1940
- Status: Converted to electric or closed
- Operators: Melbourne Tramway & Omnibus Company, later MMTB
Electric tram era: 1889–present
- Status: Operational
- Operators: Melbourne & Metropolitan Tramways Board, later Yarra Trams

The Melbourne tram network began in 1884 with the construction of the Fairfield Horse Tramway. However, the purpose of the line was to increase land prices in the area, and it soon closed during the depression in 1890. The first genuine attempt to construct a tramway network was the construction of the Richmond cable tram line by the Melbourne Tramway & Omnibus Company in 1885. Over the next few years, 16 more cable tram lines were constructed, as well as numerous other horse tramways. The depression of the early 1890s slowed further expansion of the cable network. The first electric tram line was the Box Hill and Doncaster tramway which opened in 1889. This was a pioneering line in what was then the countryside and thus didn't receive much patronage. It closed in 1896. The next attempt at an electric tramway was Victorian Railways' St Kilda to Brighton line, which opened in 1906. Later that year, the North Melbourne Electric Tramway & Lighting Company opened lines to Essendon and Maribyrnong. Many local councils formed their own tramway trusts and built tramways within their own constituency. The most successful of these was the Prahran & Malvern Tramways Trust.

Consolidation of all of the systems occurred with the forming of the Melbourne & Metropolitan Tramways Board in 1920, who eventually took control of all lines except for the two Victorian Railways lines. The MMTB continued the expansion of the electric tramways and began the process of electrifying the cable network, which began in earnest by the mid-1920s. Though many more lines were planned, the Great Depression and World War II slowed the process of construction. The electrification of the cable network was effectively completed by 1956 with the opening of the Bourke Street lines. However, by this time, the increasing popularity of the motor vehicle and the anti-tram Bolte government prevented any expansion in the following years, and overall patronage began to decline. The VR closed its two lines and the MMTB also closed many of its shorter, more marginal routes. The decades following the late 1970s saw the expansion of tram lines to outer suburbs such as Bundoora, Vermont South, Airport West, and Box Hill. Establishment of a state-run corporation to operate Melbourne's tram network occurred in 1983. In 1997, the tram network was split into two and later privatized. Since 2004, Yarra Trams has been the sole operator of the Melbourne Tram Network.

This timeline lists all of the openings, extensions and closures of all lines, as well as other significant events of the Melbourne Tram Network.

== 1880s ==
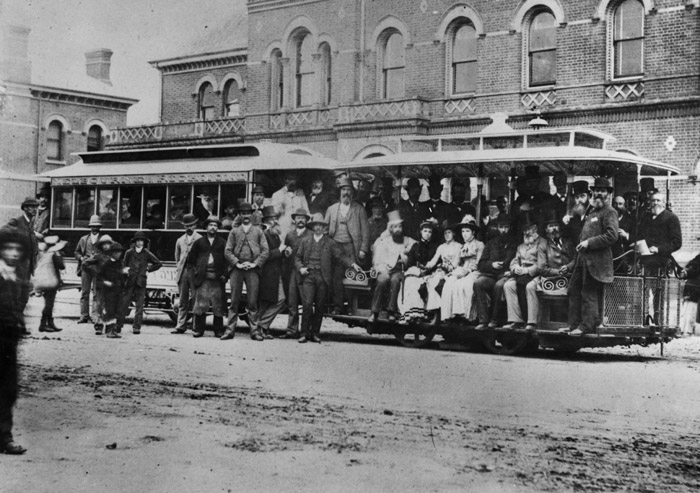
The opening of the Richmond cable line on 11 November 1885

1884

- 20 December: Fairfield Horse tramway opens between Fairfield Park and Fairfield station.

1885

- 11 November: The Melbourne Tramway & Omnibus Company (MTOC) opens the Richmond cable tram line between Hawthorn Bridge and Spencer Street (Bourke Street).

1886

- 2 October: North Fitzroy cable tram line opens between Barkly Street, Fitzroy North and Collins Street via Brunswick Street.
- 22 November: Victoria Street cable tram line opens as a branch of the North Fitzroy line from Victoria Parade to Victoria Bridge. Services run from Collins Street.

1887

- 10 August: Clifton Hill cable tram line opens between Clifton Hill and Bourke Street via Smith Street.
- 30 August: Nicholson Street cable tram line opens as a branch of the Clifton Hill line from Gertrude Street to Park Street, Fitzroy North.
- 1 October: Brunswick cable tram line opens between Moreland Road and Elizabeth Street via Royal Parade.
- 21 December: Collingwood cable tram line opens between the Johnston Street Bridge and Swanston Street via Russell and Lygon Streets.
- 28 December: MTOC opens the Kew horse tramway between the cable terminus of Victoria Bridge and Boroondara General Cemetery.

1888

- 17 May: The Beaumaris Tramway Company opens the Beaumaris horse tramway opens between Sandringham station and Cheltenham station.
- 11 October: Brighton Road cable tram line opens between Flinders Street station and Brighton Road at Milton Street, Balaclava.
- 26 October: Prahran cable tram line opens as a branch of the Brighton Road line from Domain Road to Carlisle Street via Chapel Street. Services run from Flinders Street station.

1889

- 20 January: The extension of the Brighton Road and Prahran cable tram lines between Flinders Street Station and Queensberry Street opens.
- 9 February: North Carlton cable tram line opens between Rathdowne Street and Park Street, Carlton North. Services run from Swanston Street.
- 14 February: The Northern Tramway Company opens the Coburg horse tramway between Moreland Road and Gaffney Street along Sydney Road.
- 15 February: Toorak cable tram line opens as a branch of the Prahran cable tram line from Chapel Street to Irving Street along Toorak Road.
- April: The Caulfield Tramway Company opens two horse tramways: from Elsternwick station to Caulfield station, and from Elsternwick railway to Glen Huntly station.
- 14 October: The Box Hill & Doncaster Tramway Company opens an electric tramway between Box Hill and Doncaster. It was the first electric tramway in Australia.
- late 1889: Elsternwick railway station to Caulfield railway station horse tramway closes.

== 1890s ==
1890

- Fairfield horse tramway closes.
- 27 January: Melbourne Tramway & Omnibus Company opens the Hawthorn horse tramway from the cable terminus of Hawthorn Bridge to the intersection of Auburn and Riversdale Roads.
- 18 February: The Clifton Hill, Northcote & Preston Tramway Company opens the Northcote cable tram line between the cable terminus of Clifton Hill and the intersection of Dundas and High Streets.
- 3 March: North Melbourne cable tram line opened as a branch of the Brunswick line from Victoria Street to Flemington Bridge station via Abbotsford Street.
- 10 March: MTOC opens the Zoo tramway between the Zoo and Royal Parade via Royal Park.
- 18 April: West Melbourne cable tram line opens as a branch of the Brunswick and North Melbourne cable tram lines from Lonsdale Street to Queensberry Street via Spencer Street.
- 16 June: South Melbourne cable tram line opens between Market Street and South Melbourne Beach via City Road.
- 20 June: Port Melbourne cable tram line opens as a branch of the South Melbourne cable tram line from Clarendon Street to Port Melbourne via City Road.

1891

- 27 October: Windsor & St Kilda Beach cable tram line opens between Chapel Street and Acland Street via The Esplanade.

1892

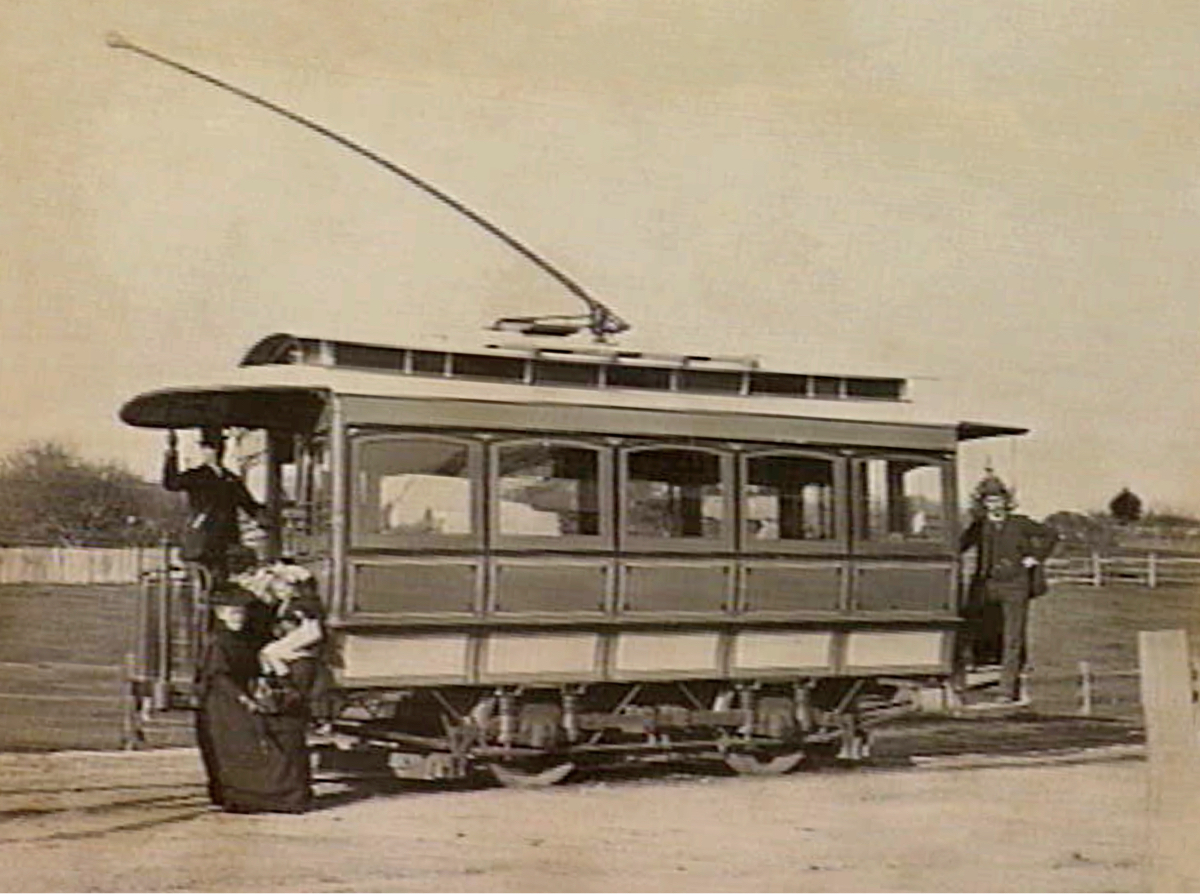
- Tram on the Box Hill to Doncaster line
  Operation of the Box Hill and Doncaster electric tramway was taken over by the Doncaster & Box Hill Electric Road Company.

1893

- 7 July: Northcote cable tram line closes following a financial crisis within the Clifton Hill, Northcote and Preston Tramway Company.

1894

- 7 April: Northcote cable tram line reopens with Northcote council taking control.
- Elsternwick station to Glen Huntly station horse tramway closes.

1896

- 6 January: Box Hill and Doncaster electric tramway closes.

1897

- 27 November: Northcote cable tram line closes again due to cost-cutting measures.

== 1900s ==
1901

- March: Northcote cable tram line reopens once again.
- Elsternwick station to Glen Huntly station horse tramway reopens.

1902

- Elsternwick railway station to Glenhuntly railway station horse tramway closes again.

1904

- North Melbourne Electric Tramway & Lighting Company (NMETL) was granted permission to construct tramways and supply lighting to the Essendon district.

1905

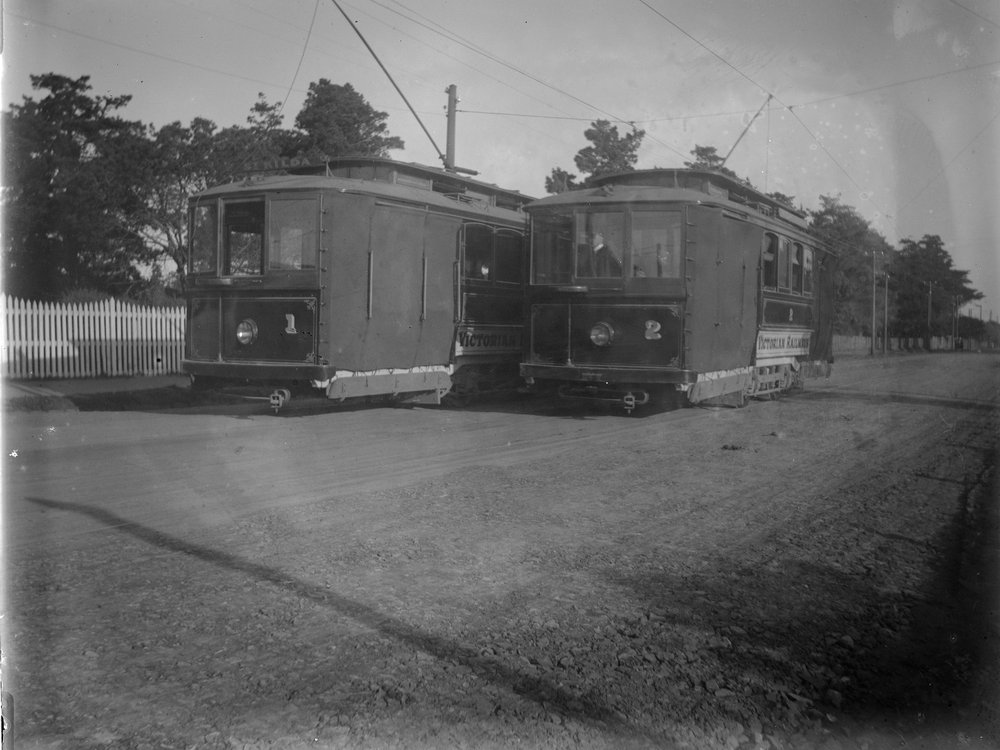
- Two Victorian Railways trams on the St Kilda to Brighton line, c.1906
  September: Victorian Railways (VR) authorized to construct a tramway from St Kilda station to Brighton.

1906

- 5 May: VR opens the St Kilda to Brighton electric street railway between St Kilda station and Park Street, Middle Brighton. It was constructed as a single track line with passing loops, and the broad gauge line featured a connection to the suburban railway network at St Kilda station. Elwood depot opens.
- 11 October: NMETL opens the Essendon line from Flemington Bridge to Keilor Road. It also opens the Maribyrnong line between Flemington Bridge station and Saltwater River (Maribyrnong River). A branch line was also built along Puckle Street to Moonee Ponds station. Essendon depot opens.
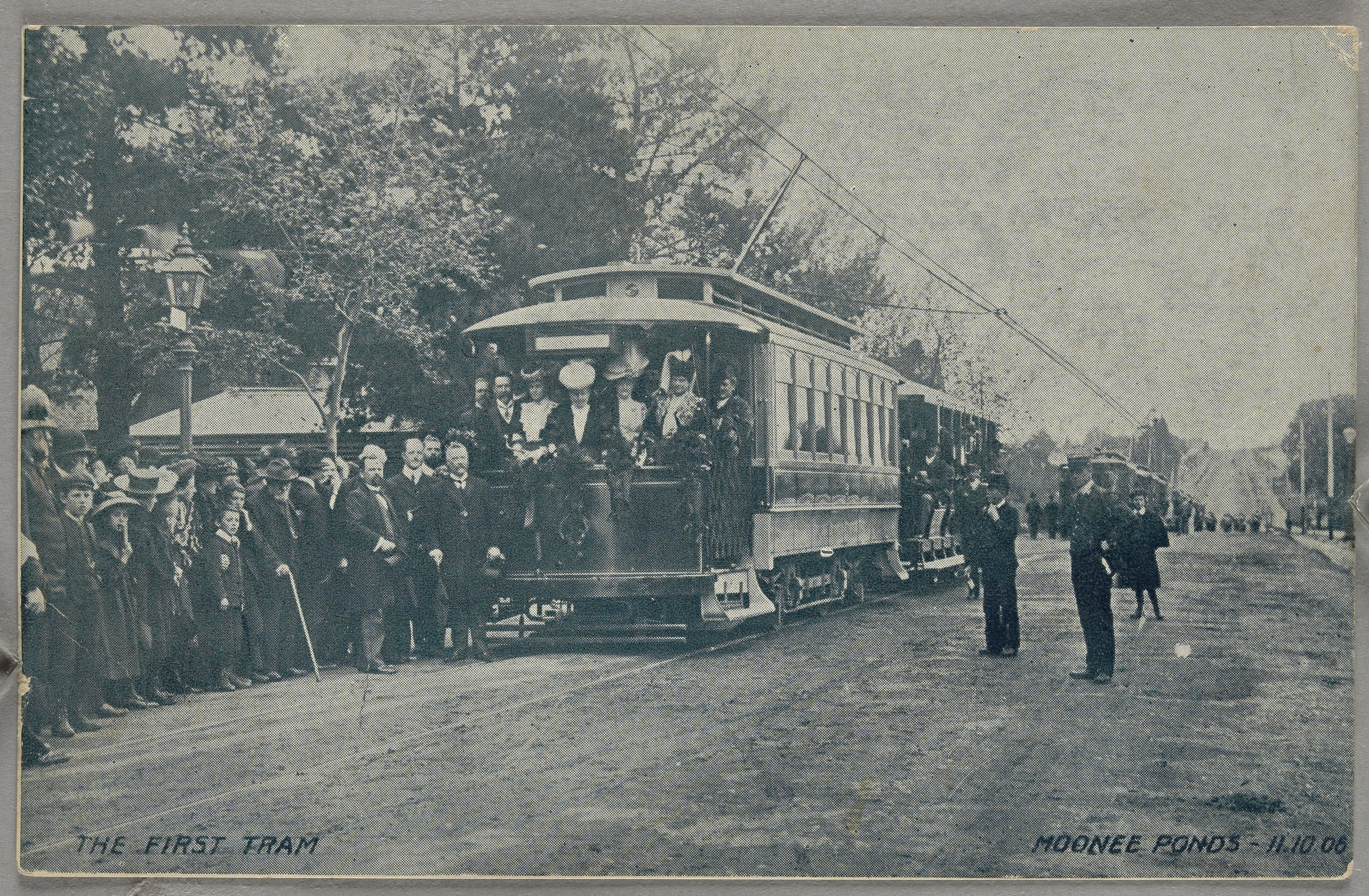
- Opening of the NMETL lines on 11 October 1906
  22 December: VR extends the Brighton line from Middle Brighton to Brighton Beach station.

1907

- 7 March: A fire at Elwood Depot destroys all VR rollingstock and forces a temporary closure to the St Kilda and Brighton electric street railway. The service resumes on 17 March after VR hurriedly buys second-hand electric tram cars from Sydney.

1908

- 6 July: Prahran & Malvern Tramways Trust was constituted by the Prahran and Malvern town councils to construct tramways within their district.

== 1910s ==
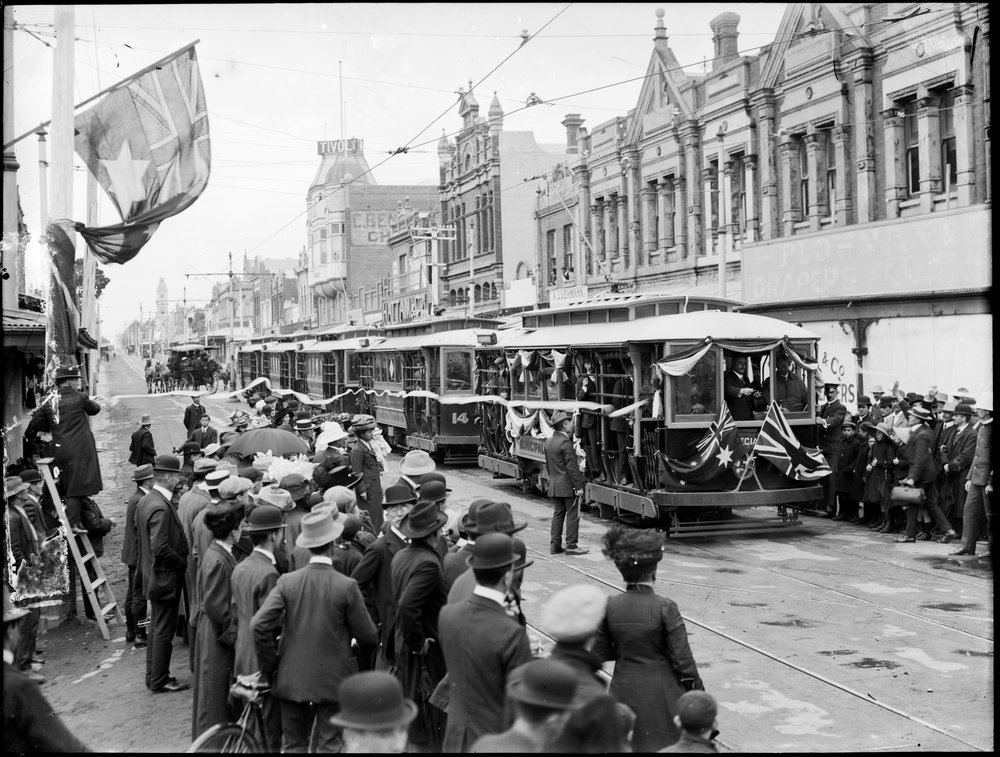
The PMTT opened the Dandenong Road line on 16 December 1911

1910

- 30 May: Prahran and Malvern Tramways Trust (PMTT) opens the High Street line between Charles Street, Prahran to Tooronga Road. The Wattletree Road line also opens between Burke Road and Glenferrie Road. The Glenferrie Road line opens between High Street and Wattletree Road. Malvern depot opens.

1911

- 14 March: PMTT extends the High Street line from Charles Street to Punt Road.
- 16 December: PMTT opens the Dandenong Road line from the Windsor railway bridge to Glenferrie Road. The Glenferrie Road line is extended from Wattletree Road to Dandenong Road.

1912

- 31 March: PMTT extends the Dandenong Road line from the Windsor railway bridge to Chapel Street to meet with the Windsor and Prahran cable tram lines.
- 14 September: PMTT extends the High Street line from Punt Road to St Kilda Road to meet the Brighton Road cable tram line.
- The Beaumaris Tramway Company closes part of the Beaumaris horse tramway between Cheltenham and Beaumaris.

1913

- 12 April: PMTT opens the Balaclava Road line from St Kilda Beach to Hawthorn Road. The Hawthorn Road line opens between Balaclava Road and Dandenong Road.
- 30 May: PMTT extends the Glenferrie Road line from High Street to Cotham Road. PMTT also opens the Kew line between Kew Post Office and Burke Road.
- 27 August: NMETL extends the Flemington Bridge station terminus to meet with the North Melbourne cable tram line.
- 13 November: PMTT opens the East Malvern line from Hawthorn Road to Darling Road. The Hawthorn Road line is extended from Balaclava Road to Glen Huntly Road. PMTT also open the Glen Huntly Road line between Elsternwick and Grange Road, Glen Huntly.

1914

- 17 February: The Brunswick & Coburg Tramways Trust (BCTT) was constituted to construct and operate an electric railway between the Carlton North cable tram terminus to Brunswick and Coburg, including the electrification of the Coburg horse tramway.
- 25 March: PMTT extends the High Street line from Tooronga Road to Malvern Road, Glen Iris.
- 14 June: The Hawthorn Tramways Trust (HTT) was constituted to construct and operate an electric tramway from Melbourne to Burwood.
- 20 June: PMTT construct a loop at Waverley Road on the Darling Road to facilitate Caulfield Racecourse traffic.
- June: The rest of the Beaumaris horse tramway closes.
- 26 October: BCTT is reconstituted as the Melbourne, Brunswick & Coburg Tramways Trust (MBCTT) following authorization to build a tram line to meet the Queensberry Street cable tram terminus.
- 1 November: The Kew horse tramway closes for impending electrification of the line by the PMTT.

1915

- 24 February: PMTT extends the Kew line to the east side of Victoria Bridge along the route of the former horse tramway.
- 8 April: PMTT opens the Malvern Road line from St Kilda Road to Burke Road, Gardiner.
- 8 May: PMTT opens the East Kew line from Kew Post Office to Kew Cemetery via High Street along the route of the former horse tramway. Kew depot opens.
- 4 June: PMTT extends the Glen Huntly Road line from Elsternwick to Point Ormond.
- 4 July: PMTT extends the Kew line over the Yarra River to meet the Victoria Street cable tram line.
- 3 August: The Fitzroy, Northcote & Preston Tramways Trust (FNPTT) are constituted to construct a new electric tramway along St Georges Road, Preston.
- 26 November: PMTT extends the East Kew line to Strathalbyn Street, Kew.
- 5 December: The Coburg horse tramway is closed for impending electrification of the line by the MBCTT.
- 30 December: The Footscray Tramway Trust is constituted to provide electric tram services in the area.

1916

- 18 January: The Melbourne & Metropolitan Tramways Board is constituted as an interim body to take over the cable tramways from the Melbourne Tramway & Omnibus Company, pending the future consolidation of all of the tramway systems.
- 31 January: The Hawthorn horse tramway is closed for impending electrification of the line by the HTT.
- 18 March: PMTT construct a balloon loop at the St Kilda Beach terminus.
- 6 April: HTT opens the Swan Street line from Batman Avenue to Hawthorn depot. Hawthorn depot opens.
- 27 April: MBCTT opens the Moreland line from Coburg Depot to Sydney Road along Moreland Road, and the Sydney Road line from Moreland Road to Bell Street. Coburg depot opens.
- 7 May: HTT extends the Swan Street line to Auburn Road via Riversdale Road along the former horse tramway.
- 14 May: MBCTT extends the Sydney Road line from Bell Street to Bakers Road, Coburg North.
- 31 May: HTT extends the Swan Street line to Camberwell Junction. The Burwood line opens from Camberwell Junction to Bowen Street, Camberwell.
- 10 June: HTT further extends the Burwood line to Boundary Road (now Warrigal Road), Burwood.
- 12 June: HTT opens the Hawthorn line between Hawthorn Bridge and Riversdale Junction, Hawthorn along the former Hawthorn Horse Tramway.
- 14 August: MBCTT opens the Lygon Street line from Coburg Depot to Park Street, Carlton.
- 30 September: PMTT opens the Mont Albert line from Burke Road to Union Road, Mont Albert along Whitehorse Road.
- 2 October: FTT granted authorization to construct tramway system.
- 25 October: HTT opens the Riversdale Road line from Camberwell Junction to Wattle Valley Road.
- 31 October: MBCTT extends the Lygon Street line from Park Street to Queensberry Street to meet the cable tram terminus. The East Coburg line is also opened from Coburg depot to Bell Street via Nicholson Street.
- 9 November: HTT extends Riversdale Road line from Wattle Valley Road line to Highfield Road.
- 23 December: HTT extends Riversdale Road line from Highfield Road to Wattle Park.

1917

- 6 December: PMTT opens the Burke Road line from Gardiner to Camberwell station.

1918

- 7 March: PMTT opens line from Camberwell station to Cotham Road along Burke Road. Initially, it is operated as a shuttle service due to the incomplete railway bridge at Camberwell.
- March: Hawthorn Depot is expanded.
- June: MBCTT rebuilds Queensberry Street terminus to provide a more convenient interchange with the cable trams.
- 10 September: FNPTT commences construction on the St Georges Road line.
- September: The Camberwell railway bridge is completed and through running along Burke Road commences.

1919

- 10 March: VR opens a new line between Sandringham station and Black Rock. Unlike the St Kilda to Brighton line, this line was built at Standard Gauge.
- 1 November: Melbourne & Metropolitan Tramways Board (MMTB) is formed with the intention to take over, operate and unify the various tramways excluding the two lines operated by VR. The cable tramways and the Zoo horse tramway is taken over by the MMTB at this date.

== 1920s ==
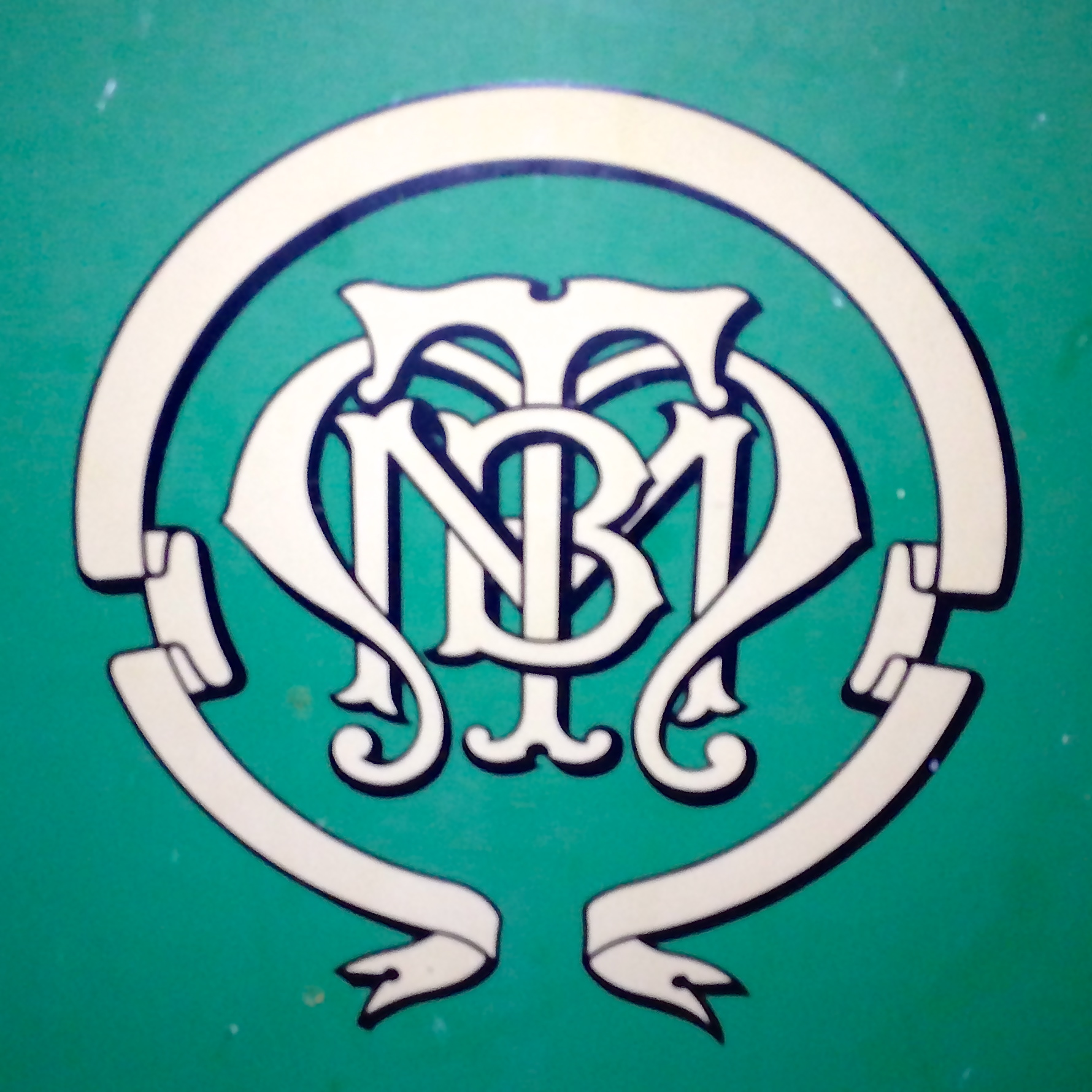
The Melbourne & Metropolitan Tramways Board took over all tramways between by 1922

1920

- 27 January: Fitzroy, Northcote & Preston Tramways Trust (FNPTT) conducts a trial run of its lines using its only completed tram, just one week before Melbourne & Metropolitan Tramways Board takeover. Preston Depot opens.
- 2 February: MMTB assumes control of the Northcote cable tram line, and the five municipal electric tramways: Prahran & Malvern Tramways Trust, Hawthorn Tramways Trust, Melbourne, Brunswick & Coburg Tramways Trust, FNPTT and Footscray Tramway Trust. The privately owned tramways of the North Melbourne Electric Tramway & Lighting Company were not included in the above arrangement. The Victorian Railways tramways were retained by the railways.
- 1 April: MMTB opens lines constructed by the FNPTT. The West Preston line is opened from Regent Street to St Georges Road. The East Preston line is opened from Tyler Street to St Georges Road. The St Georges Road line is opened from Miller Street to Barkly Street, Fitzroy North.
- 30 August: Chocolate and Cream was adopted as the standard livery for all trams of the MMTB.

1921

- 6 September: MMTB opens lines constructed by the FTT. The Ballarat Road line opens from Ballarat Road to Footscray station. The Williamstown Road line opens from Williamstown Road to Footscray station. The Russell Street line opens from Russell Street, West Footscray to Droop Street.
- Holden Street Workshops was established as an interim workshop pending establishment of a central tramway workshop.

1922

- 1 August: NMETL tram lines were purchased by the MMTB. The electricity aspect of the NMETL was acquired by the State Electricity Commission of Victoria.

1923

- 7 July: The extension of the Essendon line from Keilor Road to Gilles Street opens.
- 7 July: MMTB opens the Church Street line from Barkers Road to Hawthorn Bridge, connecting the Kew line to the Richmond cable tram terminus at Hawthorn Bridge.
- 23 August: Glenhuntly depot opens.
- 27 August: MMTB constructs a single track siding in Napier Street, Essendon for football traffic at Windy Hill.
- 5 November: The Zoo horse tram depot and rollingstock was all destroyed in a fire during a police strike. The line, which was the last horse tram operating in Melbourne, was subsequently closed.
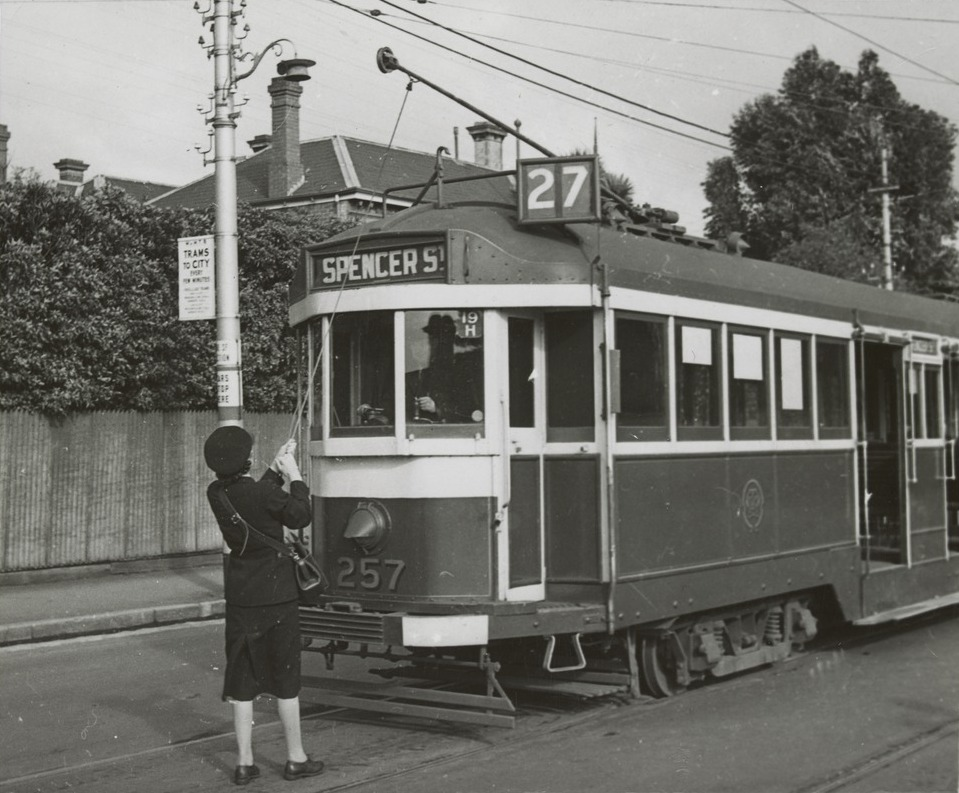
- A 1923 W Class tram at Hawthorn, 1942
  21 December: The first W class tram enters service.

1924

- 12 January: The Puckle Street line was closed. The line had seen very little use since the MMTB acquisition.
- 11 February: MMTB construct a cable tram line on Lonsdale Street between Elizabeth Street and Swanston Street. This was done in preparation for the electrification of the Swanston Street cable tram line between Queensberry Street and Lonsdale Street.
- 13 April: MMTB opens the Swanston Street line between Queensberry Street and Lonsdale Street. This enabled Sydney Road line and East Coburg line trams to be connected to the city.
- 8 July: MMTB opens the Chapel Street line between Swan Street and Toorak Road. Services originate from Batman Avenue.
- 10 October: Construction of a tramway workshop commences at Preston.
- 20 October: The extension of the Chapel Street line between Swan Street and Victoria Street, North Richmond opens.
- December: Coburg Depot is expanded.

1925

- 11 January: The East Kew line is extended from Strathalbyn Street to Burke Road.
- 1 March: The extension of the Hawthorn Road line between Glen Huntly Road and North Road opens.
- 24 March: MMTB opens Holden Street line from St Georges Road to Nicholson Street. This enabled East Preston line and West Preston line trams to run to the city via Swanston Street.
- March: MMTB opens connecting line between Northcote cable line and Clifton Hill cable tram line to allow through services between the lines.
- June: Parts of Preston Workshops opens.
- 19 July: MMTB opens the William Street line between Collins Street and Haymarket. The Flemington Road line is opened between Haymarket and Flemington Bridge station, with the section of track between Flemington Bridge and Abbotsford Street being constructed along former sections of the North Melbourne cable line. MMTB also opens the Royal Park line between Flemington Road and Daly Street, Brunswick West. In turn, the North Melbourne cable tram line gets truncated back to Abbotsford Street. This allows Essendon line and Maribyrnong line trams to terminate in the city at William Street terminus.
- 29 August: Windsor to St Kilda cable line closes for impending electrification.
- 31 October: MMTB opens Sturt Street line between City Road and Clarendon Street. The South Melbourne/St Kilda Beach line opens between Park Street, South Melbourne and St Kilda Beach. Hanna Street depot opens.
- 26 December: Brighton Road cable tram line closes for impending electrification.
- 27 December: The extension of the Dandenong Road line from Chapel Street to St Kilda Road opens. MMTB opens the St Kilda Beach line between St Kilda Road and Acland Street. These lines are built along the former Windsor to St Kilda cable line.
- 27 December: MMTB opens the line between Hanna Street (now Kings Way) and St Kilda Road at Domain Road. Temporary electric tracks are laid in St Kilda Road between Domain Road and St Kilda Junction, allowing trams from the south to run through to City Road.

1926

- 12 January: Prahran and Toorak trams are truncated back to Domain Road pending electrification of St Kilda Road tracks.
- 24 January: The extension of the Swanston Street line from Lonsdale Street to City Road opens along the former Queensberry Street cable tram line on Swanston Street.
- 28 March: The St Kilda Road line between City Road and Domain Road is electrified.
- 9 May: Permanent double tracks are laid in St Kilda Road between Domain Road and St Kilda Junction, replacing the temporary ones.
- 16 May: The Malvern Road line, High Street line and Dandenong Road line are extended to St Kilda Road, enabling running through to the city.
- 31 May: MMTB constructs siding in Victoria Street, enabling Swanston Street trams from the south terminating in the city to shunt clear of through-routed trams.
- 28 August: Prahran cable line closes for impending electrification.
- 29 August: MMTB opens line between Elsternwick and St Kilda Junction via Brighton Road, partially using the former cable tram line.
- 1 September: Victorian Railways extends the Sandringham line from Black Rock to Beaumaris.
- 1 October: Toorak cable tram line closes pending electrification.
- 31 October: The extension of the Chapel Street line from Toorak Road to Windsor station opens along the former cable tram line.
- 19 December: The extension of the Chapel Street line from Windsor railway station to Brighton Road opens along the former cable tram line.
- 19 December: The extension of the Glen Huntly Road line from Grange Road to Carnegie opens.

1927

- 2 February: MMTB constructs connecting line between Haymarket and Victoria Street terminus, connecting the isolated Essendon system to the rest of the network.
- 17 April: MMTB opens Toorak Road line between Domain Road and Orrong Road along the former cable tram line.
- 8 May: The extension of the Toorak Road line from Orrong Road to Glenferrie Road is opened.
- 15 May: The extension of the Royal Park line from Daly Street to Moreland Road opens.
- 15 May: Richmond cable line is truncated to Swanston Street pending electrification.
- 26 June: The extension of the Royal Park line from Moreland Road to Bell Street, West Coburg opens.
- 29 June: Richmond cable line closed for impending electrification.
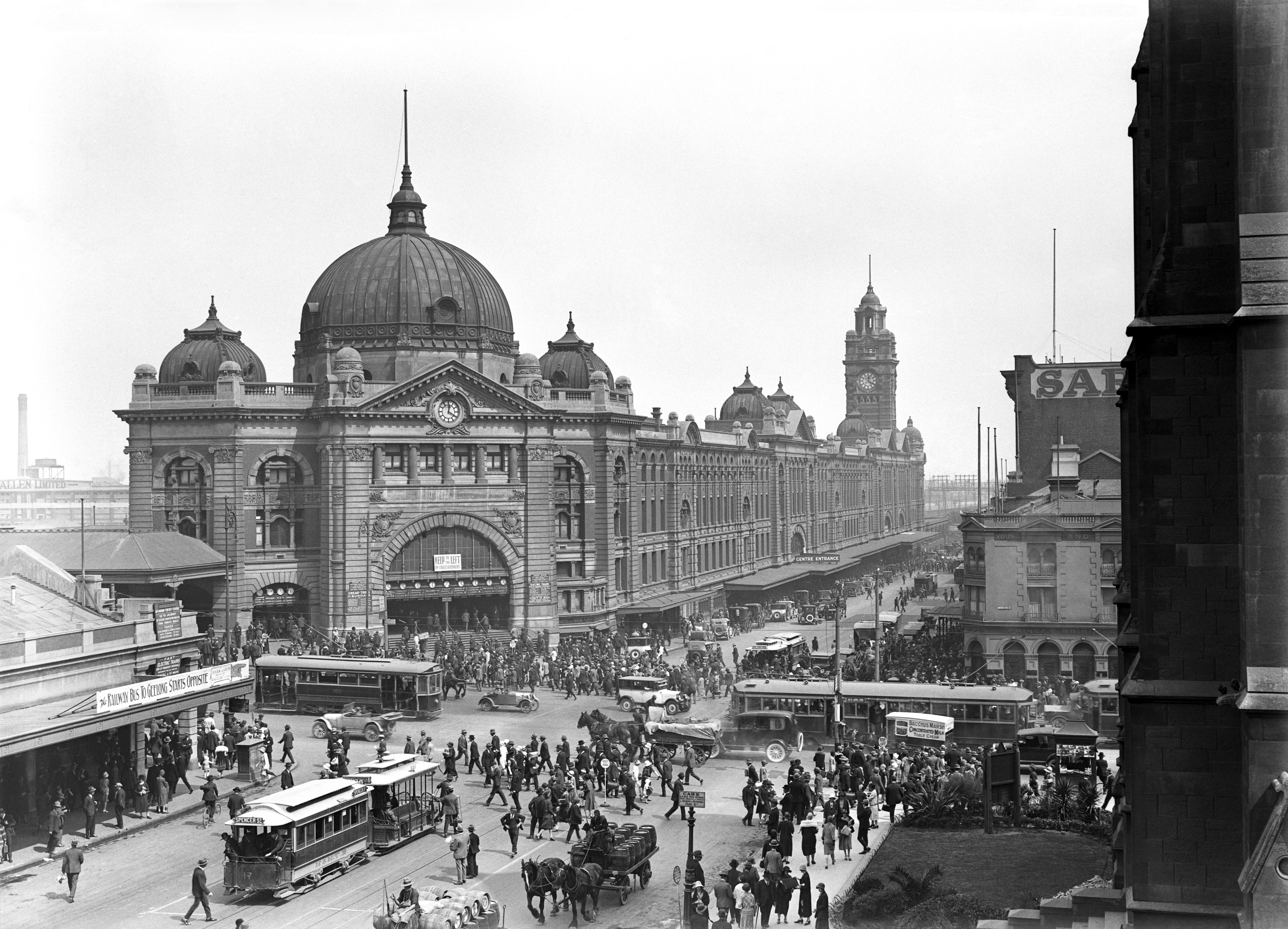
- Intersection of Flinders Street and Swanston Street, 1927
  14 July: MMTB opens Flinders Street line between Lonsdale Street and Swanston Street along the former Richmond cable tram line.
- 17 September: The extension of the Flinders Street line from Swanston Street to Wellington Parade opens along the former Richmond cable tram line. MMTB also open the Hawthorn line between Wellington Parade and Simpson Street, East Melbourne opens.
- November: Green and Cream becomes standard MMTB livery.
- 4 December: The extension of the Hawthorn line from Simpson Street to Hawthorn Bridge along the former Richmond cable tram line.

1928

- 24 June: The extension of the Wattletree Road line from Dandenong Road to Glenferrie Road opens.
- 1 July: The extension of the Riversdale Road line from Boundary Road to Elgar Road opens.
- 28 July: A siding is installed at Simpson Street, East Melbourne.
- 19 December: Route numbers introduced to the MMTB system.

1929

- 13 July: Victoria Bridge to Brunswick Street cable tram line closed for impending electrification.
- 4 August: MMTB opens connecting line between Victoria Street and Flemington Road along Racecourse Road. Victoria Street (Flemington) line closes.
- 14 September: Collins Street cable tram line closes for impending electrification.
- 15 September: MMTB opens Victoria Street line between Brunswick Street and Victoria Bridge along the former cable tram line.
- 8 December: MMTB opens Collins Street line between Spencer Street and Brunswick Street along the former cable tram line.
- 8 December: Camberwell depot opens.

== 1930s ==
1930

- 12 July: The North Fitzroy cable tram line is closed for impending electrification.
- 26 October: Melbourne & Metropolitan Tramways Board opens the Brunswick Street line between Victoria Parade and Barkly Street along the former North Fitzroy cable tram line. Services from West Preston and East Preston were now routed through to Collins Street via Brunswick Street.

1931

- 1 September 1931: Victorian Railways closes the Black Rock to Beaumaris section of the Sandringham line due to extremely low patronage in an undeveloped area.

1935

- 20 July: The North Melbourne cable tram line is closed for impending electrification. The West Melbourne cable tram line is also closed, but is replaced by a bus service.
- 24 September: MMTB opens the North Melbourne line between Victoria Street and North Melbourne along the former cable tram line.
- 29 September: The Elizabeth Street cable tram line is closed for impending electrification. Thus, the Brunswick cable tram line is truncated to Victoria Street.
- 17 November: MMTB opens the Elizabeth Street line between Victoria Street and Flinders Street along the former cable tram line.
- 17 November: The Brunswick cable tram line is further truncated to Leonard Street/Royal Parade for impending electrification.
- 29 December: The extension of the Elizabeth Street line from Victoria Street to Haymarket opens.

1936

- 11 January: The remainder of the Brunswick cable tram line is closed for impending electrification.
- 12 January: MMTB opens the southern portion of the Sydney Road line from Haymarket to Leonard Street, Parkville along the former Brunswick cable tram line.
- 23 February: The extension of the Sydney Road line from Leonard Street to Park Street opens along the former Brunswick cable tram line.
- 26 April: The extension of the Sydney Road line from Park Street to Moreland Road opens along the former Brunswick cable tram, finishing electrification of the line. Brunswick Depot opens.
- 1 August: The North Carlton cable tram line is closed, being replaced by a bus service.
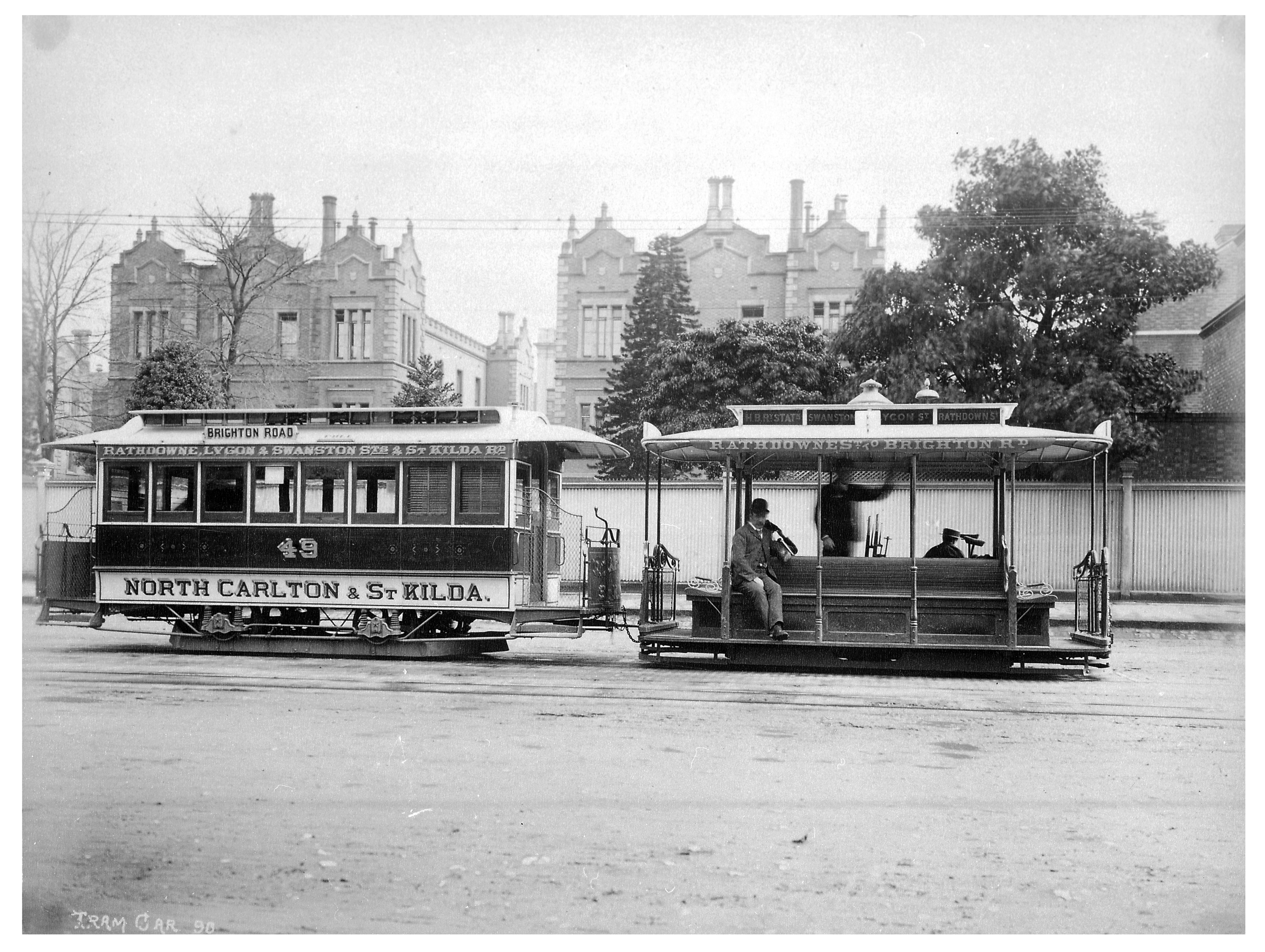
  A cable tram of the North Carlton line, which closed in 1936

1937

- 7 February: The extension of the Essendon line between Birdwood Street and Gillies Street opens.
- 13 March: The South Melbourne cable tram line is closed for impending electrification. The Port Melbourne cable tram line is closed, but is replaced by a bus service.
- 13 June: The extension of the East Kew line from Burke Road to Bulleen Road opens.
- 25 July: MMTB opens the Clarendon Street line and South Melbourne Beach line between Flinders Street and South Melbourne Beach.
- 10 September: The extension of the Hawthorn Road line between Brighton Cemetery to Eric Street opens.
- 5 December: The extension of the Hawthorn Road line between Eric Street and Point Nepean Road (now Nepean Highway) opens.

1938

- 11 December: The extension of the East Kew line from Bulleen Road to Balwyn North opens.

1939

- 15 April: The Collingwood cable tram line closed, being replaced by a bus service.
- 25 October: Services along the Holden Street line cease, being replaced by a bus service. The southern track is removed. The northern track is retained for depot transfers.

== 1940s ==
1940

- 26 October: The final cable tram lines in Melbourne cease operations. The Nicholson Street and Northcote cable tram lines close and are replaced by bus services.
- 22 December: The extension of the Maribyrnong line between Maribyrnong River and West Maribyrnong opens.

1941

- 6 July: Melbourne & Metropolitan Tramways Board opens the Ordnance Factory branch line between Raleigh Road and the Ordnance Factory.
- 20 July: The Holden Street tram services are reinstated due to wartime conditions.
- 9 November: MMTB opens the Ammunition Factory branch line between Ballarat Road and River Street.

1942

- 24 May: MMTB opens the Moonee Ponds line between Ascot Vale and Moonee Ponds Junction.

1943

- 16 May: The extension of the Essendon line from Birdwood Street to Essendon Aerodrome opens.

1944

- 21 December: The extension of the William Street line from Collins Street to Sturt Street is opened.

1945

- June: Victorian Railways states its intention to close the Sandringham tram line.

== 1950s ==
1950

- 3 September: Services on the Holden Street line again ceased. The line was retained for depot workings.

1951

- 15 January: Melbourne & Metropolitan Tramways Board opens the La Trobe Street line between Spencer Street and Brunswick Street.
- 16 January: Numbered tram stops were introduced for the first time on certain lines. They were later installed on all other routes.

1952

- 11 October: Coburg depot closes due to cost-saving measures.

1953

- 3 July: The West Preston terminus is moved to the north side of the Regent Street intersection.

1954

- 2 May: MMTB opens the Footscray line between the Ammunition Factory and the Ordnance Factory.

1955

- 24 June: East Preston depot opens. Thornbury depot closes.
- 26 June: MMTB opens the Bourke Street line and the Northcote line between Northcote and the City along the former Northcote cable tram line.

1956

- 8 April: MMTB opens the East Brunswick line between Gertrude Street and Brunswick East along the former Nicholson Street cable tram line.
- April: External advertisements were introduced on MMTB trams.
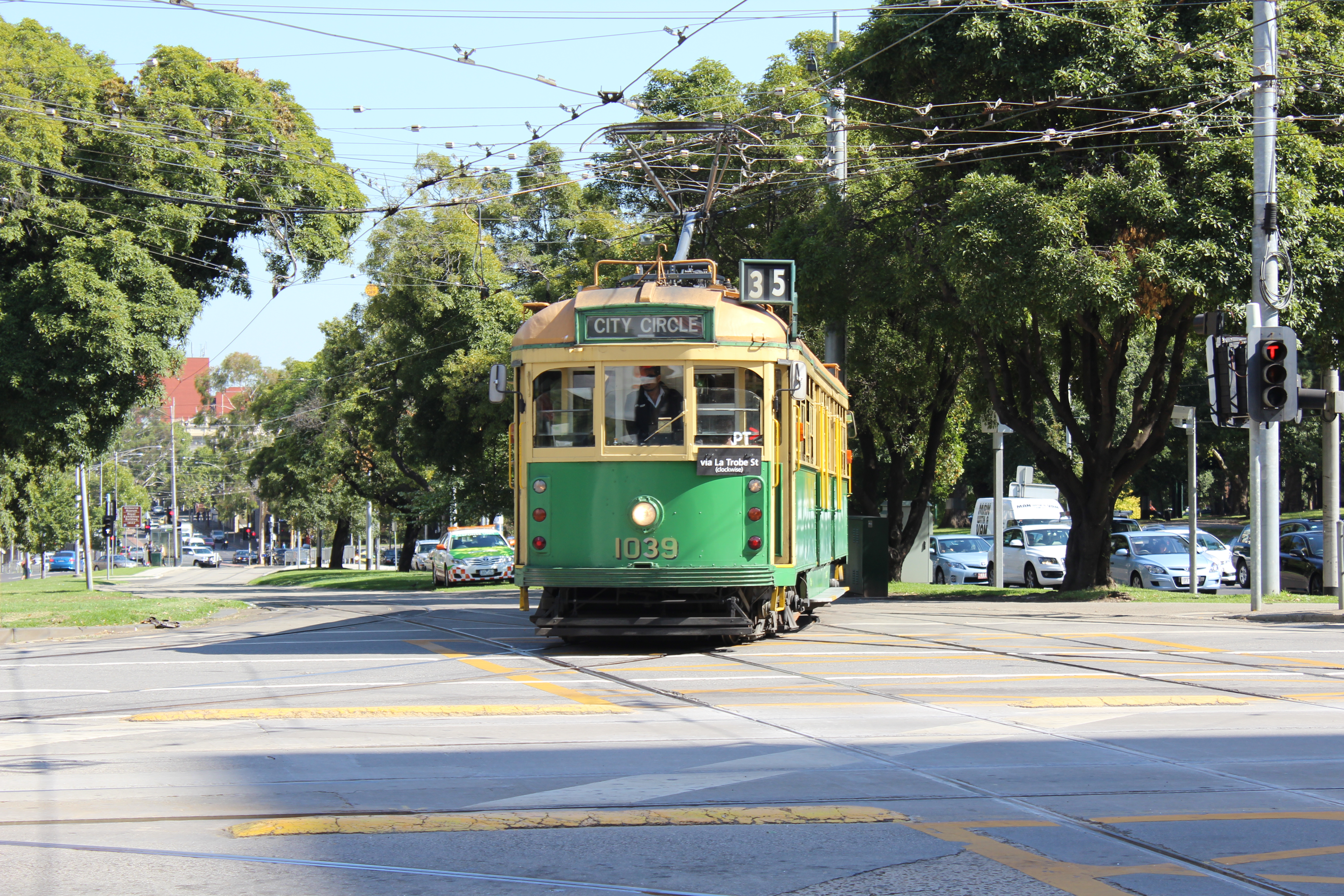
- W7 Class tram built in 1956, operating the City Circle line in 2013
  August: Final W class trams built.
- 5 November: Victorian Railways closes the Sandringham tramway. Sandringham depot closes.

1957

- 1 January: VR truncates the Brighton tramway to Middle Brighton as the first stage of the closure of the line.
- 1 July: VR further truncates the Brighton tramway to Elwood depot as the second stage of the closure of the line.

1959

- 28 February: VR closes the Brighton line altogether. Elwood depot closes.
- 13 November: MMTB relocates South Melbourne/St Kilda Beach terminus from Mary Street to Park Street.
- 22 November: Temporary track in use on the Flinders Street line due to the construction of the Kings Street overpass.

== 1960s ==
1960

- 26 June: Kings Street overpass track completed.
- 22 October: Glen Huntly Road line closed between Point Ormond and Brighton Road.

1962

- 10 March: Melbourne & Metropolitan Tramways Board closes the Russel Street line, Williamstown Road line and Ballarat Road line, leaving only the Footscray line to serve Footscray. Footscray depot closes.
- June: St Kilda Beach balloon loop is removed.

1965

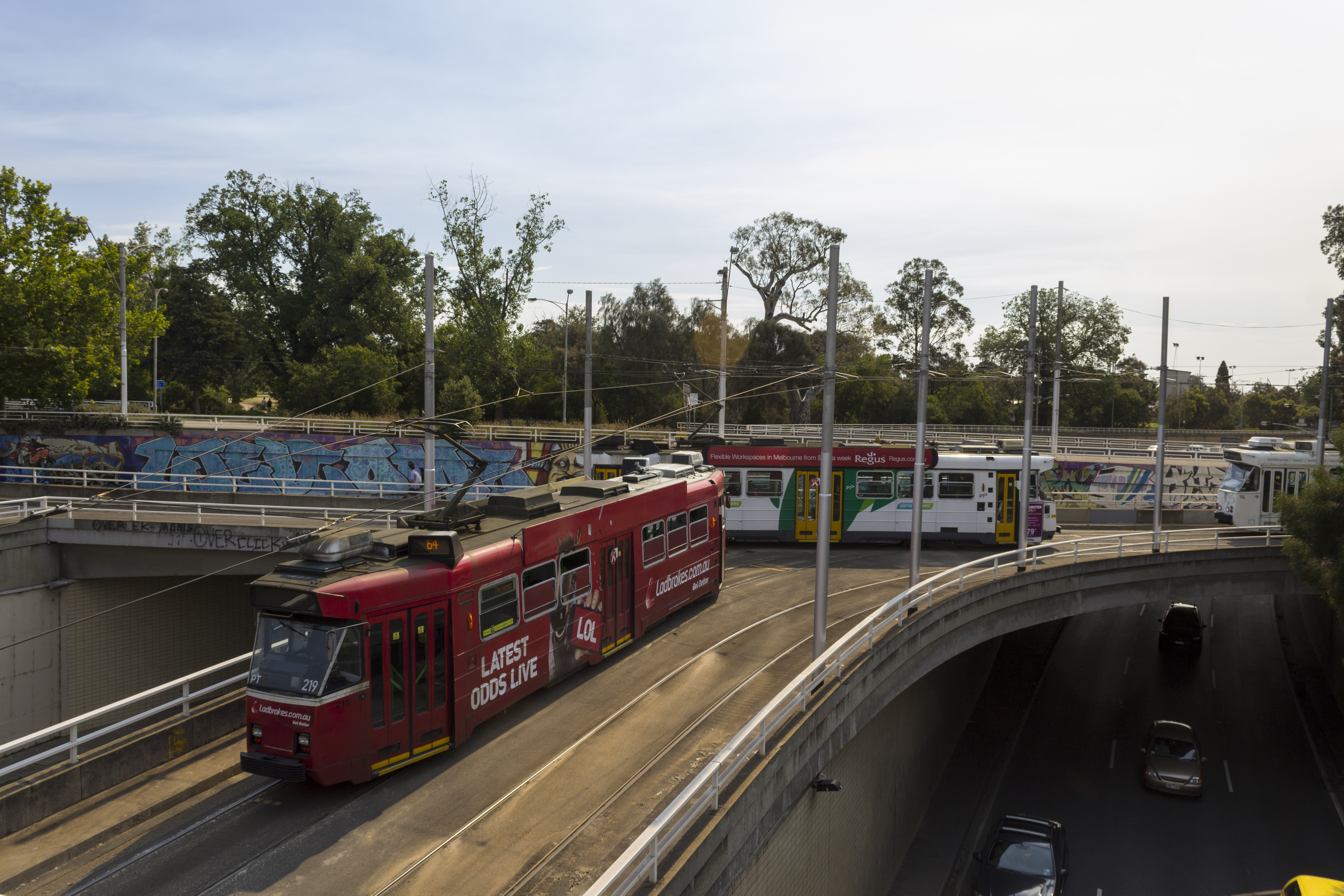
- Reconstructed St Kilda Junction
  13 February: Hawthorn depot closes for regular service.

1967

- 9 June: New Maribyrnong River Bridge is completed.
- October: Work commences on the St Kilda Junction project.

1968

- 21 October: New track is opened in Queensway, bypassing the Wellington Street line, which is abandoned.
- November: St Kilda Junction tram track alterations are complete.

== 1970s ==
1970

- 16 March: Sturt Street line is realigned via Nolan Street due to the construction of the City Road underpass.

1973

- 19 June: A siding is opened at Brunswick Street terminus.

1975

- 30 April: The first Z class trams enter service.

1976

- 19 January: The Holden Street line closes.
- 7 October: MMTB closes the Essendon line between Essendon Aerodrome and Matthews Avenue. The track is realigned to terminate at Airport West.

1978

- 12 July: The extension between Warrigal Road to Somers Street along the Burwood line opens.
- 19 July: The extension between Somers Street to Middleborough Road, Burwood East along the Burwood line opens.

== 1980s ==
1982

- 2 November: Colonial Tramcar Restaurant commences

1983

- 18 May: The extension between Tyler Street and Boldrewood Parade along the East Preston line opens.
- 1 July: Melbourne & Metropolitan Tramways Board and Victorian Railways are replaced by the Metropolitan Transit Authority (MTA) for suburban transport within Melbourne.

1984

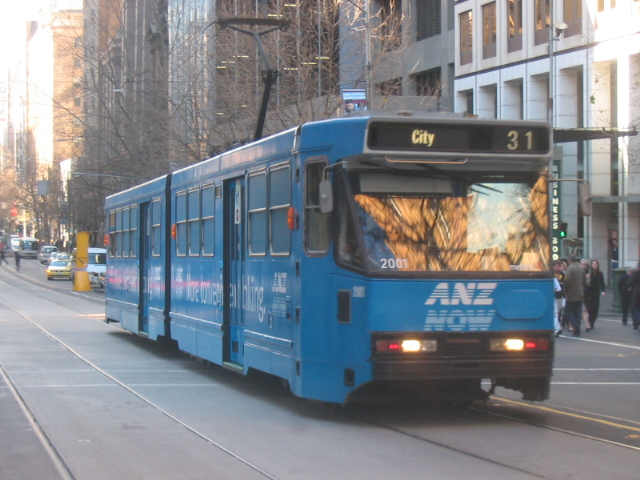
- B1 Class prototype tram on Collins Street, June 2006
- February: First A class trams enter service. First B1 Prototype tram is constructed.

1985

- 10 January: The extension between La Trobe University and Boldrewood Parade along the East Preston line opens.
- November: Preston Workshops is expanded.

1986

- 17 November: A siding is built for trams terminating at Domain Interchange along St Kilda Road.

1987

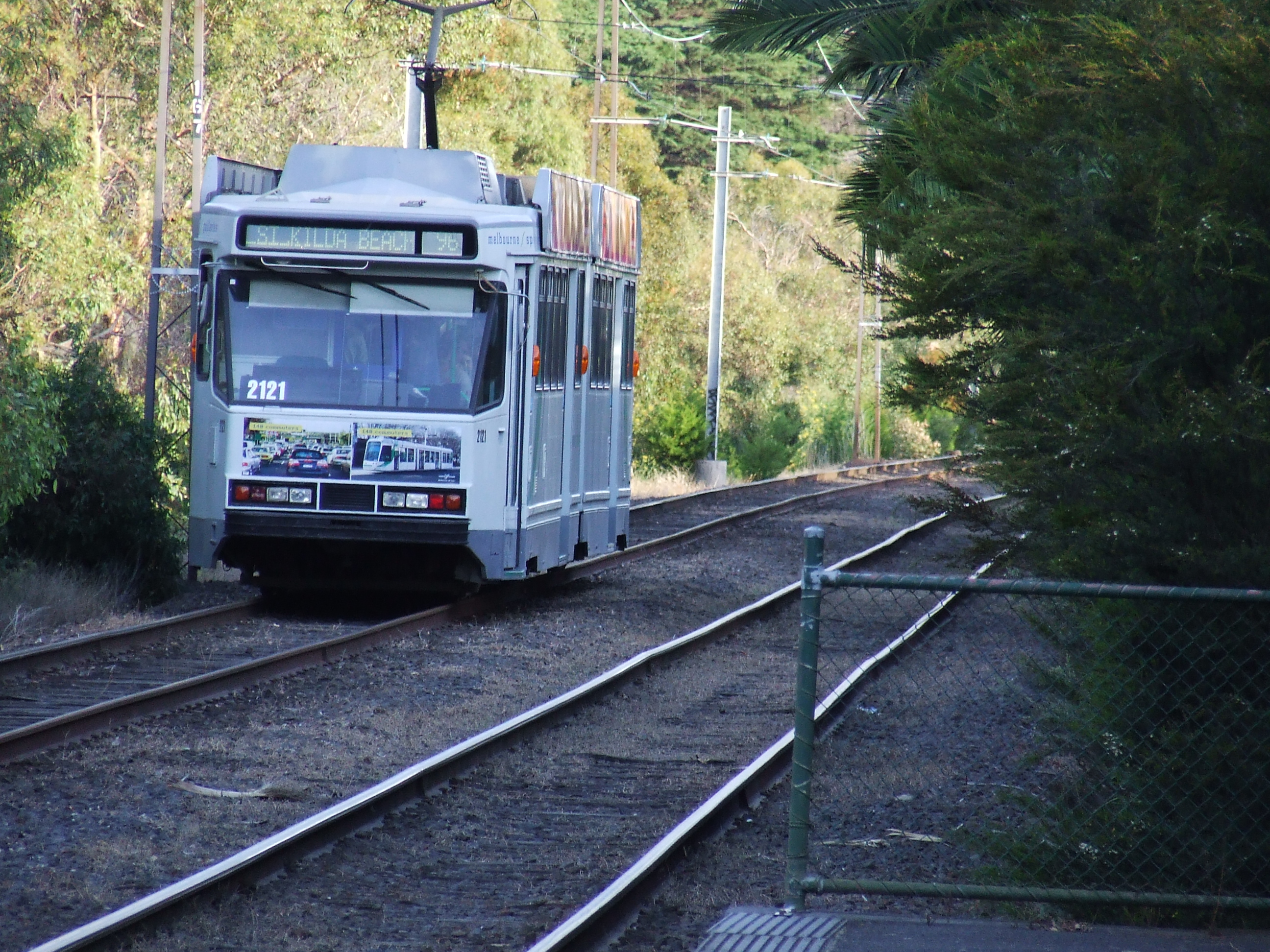
A B2 class tram runs of the St Kilda light rail, converted in 1987.

- 23 April: The extension between McLeans Road and La Trobe University opens along the East Preston line.
- 20 November: MTA opens the St Kilda light rail line between Clarendon Street Junction and St Kilda along the St Kilda railway line.
- 18 December: MTA opens the Port Melbourne light rail line between Clarendon Street Junction and Port Melbourne along the former railway line.

1988

- 1 September: First B2 class tram enters service.

1989

- 1 July: MTA is replaced by the Public Transport Corporation.

== 1990s ==
1990

- 1 January: No services operated for 33 days while hundreds of trams blockaded Melbourne's streets, as part of an industrial dispute pertaining to driver-only operation.

1992

- 22 December: The extension of the Essendon line between Matthews Avenue and Dromana Avenue opens.

1993

- 8 July: The extension of the Burwood line from Middleborough Road to Blackburn Road opens.
- 10 November: Public Transport Corporation opens the Spring Street line between Bourke Street and Flinders Street.
- 19 December: North Fitzroy depot closes.
- December: A siding opens in Spencer Street at La Trobe Street.

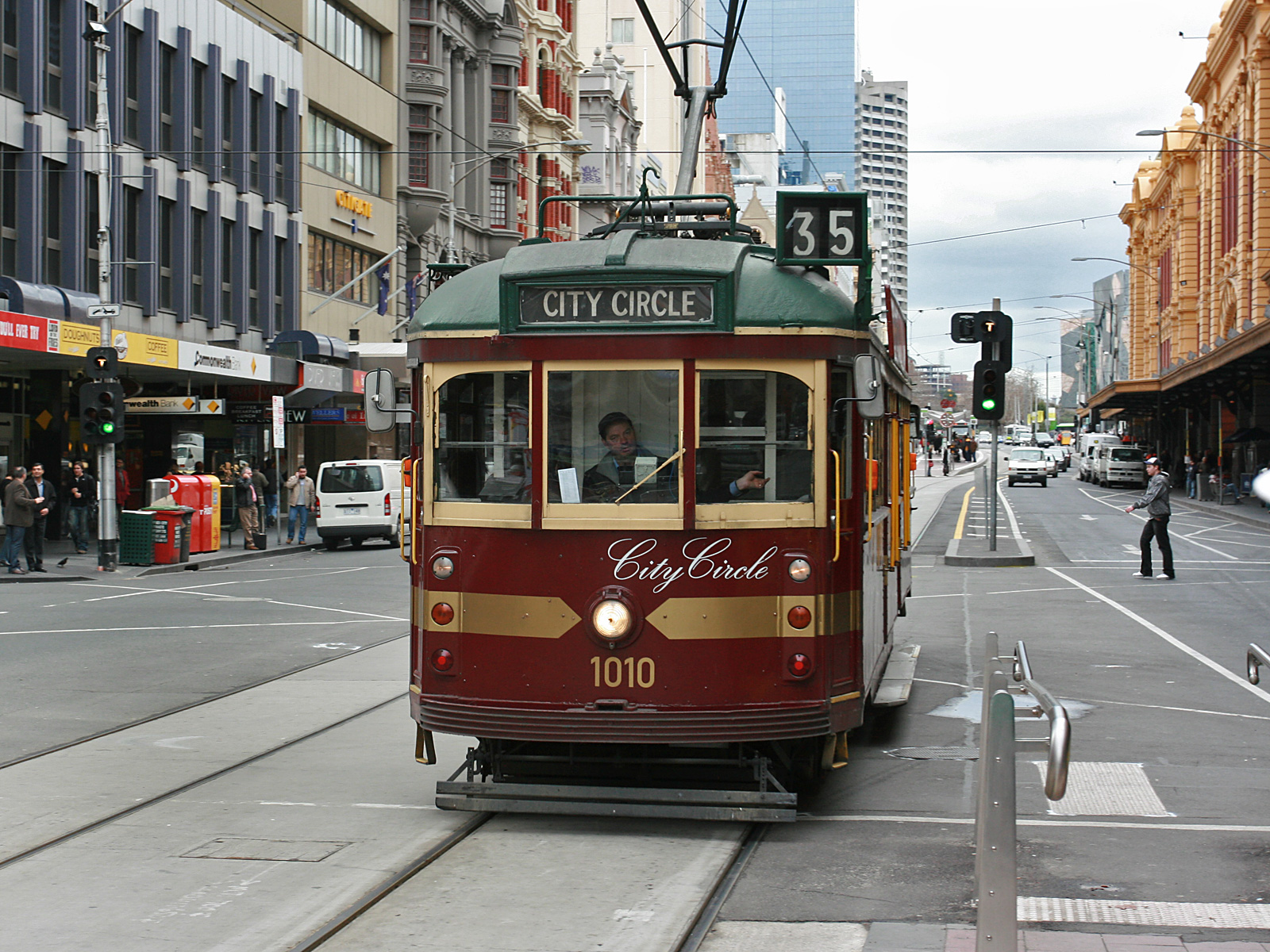
City Circle tram, which commenced in 1994

1994

- 29 April: City Circle tram commences service.

1995

- 12 October: East Preston line extended between McLeans Road and Bundoora RMIT at McKimmies Road.

1997

- 8 February: South Melbourne depot closes.Southbank depot opens.

1998

- 1 July: PTC splits operation of the tram system into Swanston Trams and Yarra Trams.

1999

- 28 May: Swan Street line between Batman Avenue terminus and near Punt Road closes.
- 6 June: Swan Street line rerouted via Melbourne Park reserved track. Flinders Street West siding opens.
- 29 August: Yarra Trams and Swanston Trams become privatised.

== 2000s ==
2000

- 26 March: The extension of the La Trobe Street line to Docklands Stadium opens.
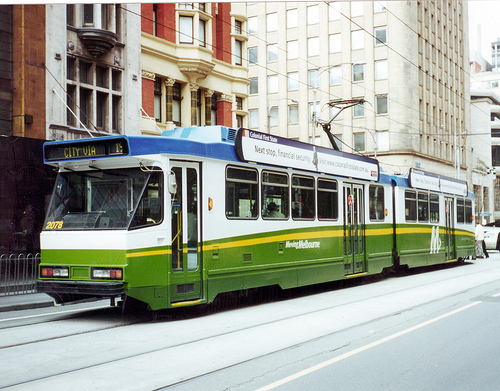
- A B2 Class tram in an M>Tram livery
  October: Swanston Trams rebranded as M>Tram

2001

- August: First C class tram enters service.

2002

- 18 November: The extension of the Collins Street line between Spencer Street and Batman's Hill opens.
- 19 December: First D class tram enters service.
- December: M>Tram franchise is handed back to the state government by National Express following failed negotiations regarding terms with KPMG appointed administrator.

2003

- 5 April: Yarra trams opens Docklands line between Flinders Street West and Harbour Esplanade.
- 2 May: The extension of the Mont Albert line from Union Road to Box Hill Central opens.

2004

- 18 April: Yarra Trams becomes sole operator of the Melbourne tram network.
- 28 June: Collins Street line truncated back to Spencer Street for redevelopment of Southern Cross station.

2005

- 4 January: The extension of the Docklands line between Harbour Esplanade and Waterfront City, Docklands opens.
- 23 July: The extension of the Burwood line between Burwood East and Vermont South opens.
- 18 November: Demolition of the King Street Overpass completed.
- 21 November: Collins Street West extension reopened.

2009

- 21 September: The extension of the Collins Street line between Batman's Hill and Victoria Harbour opens.

== 2010s ==
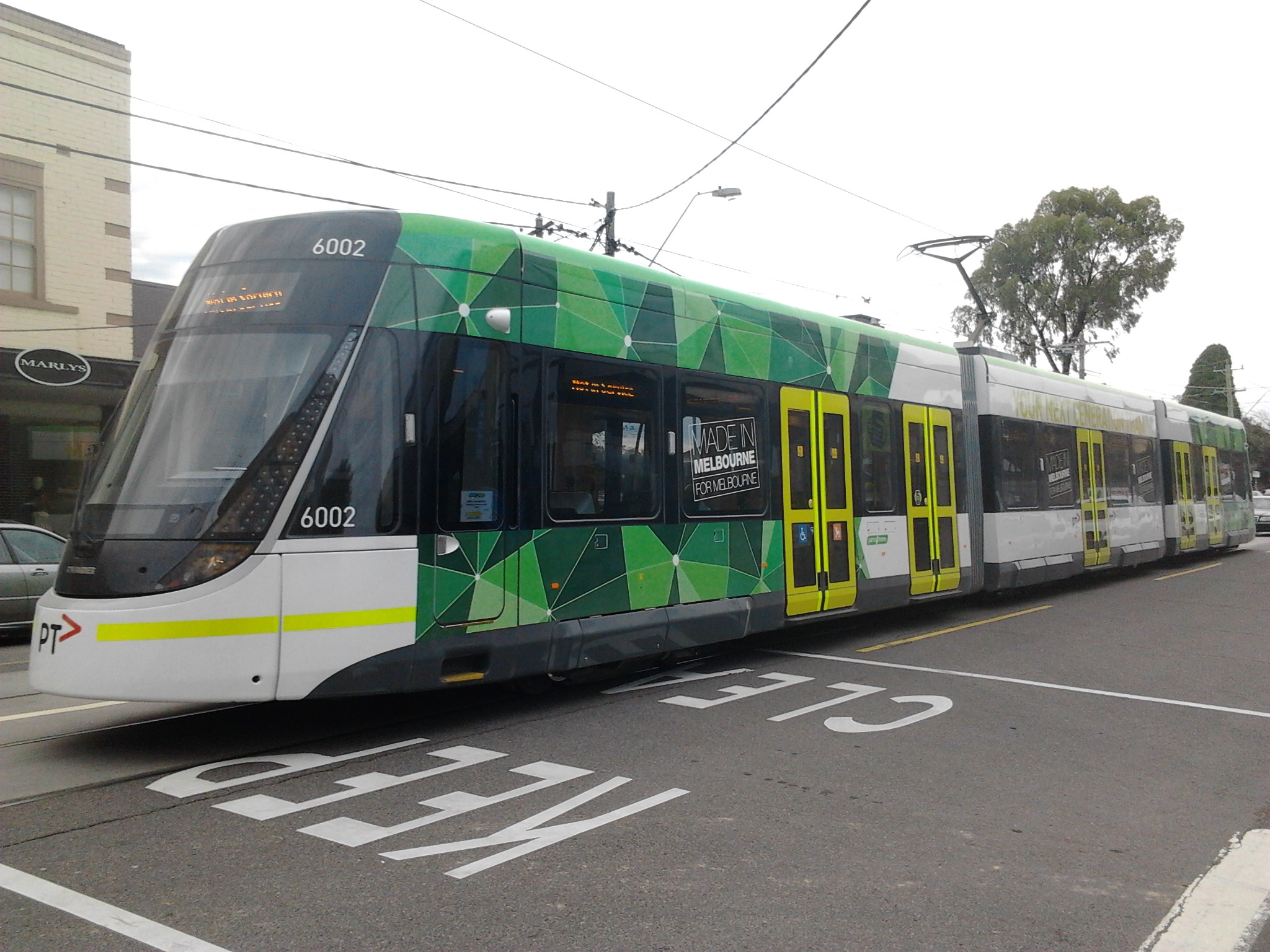
An E Class tram in North Balwyn, May 2014

2013

- 19 November: First E class trams enter service.

2014

- 26 January: The extension of the Collins Street line between Victoria Harbour and Bourke Street opens.

2017

- 1 July: New tram tracks along Toorak Road (west of Park Street) open with route 58 rerouted via the new tracks. The existing tracks along Domain Road and Park Street fell out of use as Domain Road was closed off while Anzac railway station was being built.

2018

- October: Colonial Tramcar Restaurant ceased
