= Les Angus =

Australian rules footballer, born 1905

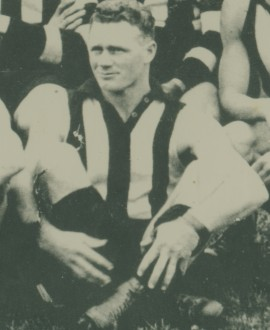
- Angus in 1928

Personal information
- Full name: Leslie Whitfield Angus
- Born: 8 November 1905; Fitzroy North, Victoria
- Died: 17 April 1974 (aged 68); Preston, Victoria
- Original team: Tresco / Lake Boga
- Height: 170 cm (5 ft 7 in)
- Weight: 73 kg (161 lb)

Playing career^{1}
Years	Club	Games (Goals)
1928	Collingwood	9 (1)
- ^{1} Playing statistics correct to the end of 1928.

Leslie Whitfield Angus (8 November 1905 – 17 April 1974) was an Australian rules footballer who played with Collingwood in the Victorian Football League (VFL).
