= Alexandra Parade =

Highway in inner northern Melbourne, Australia

Eastern Highway Alexandra Parade Victoria

General information
- Type: Highway
- Length: 1.2 km (0.7 mi)
- Route number(s): Metro Route 83 (1989–present) Entire route; Concurrencies: Metro Route 46 (1965–present) (through Fitzroy North)

Major junctions
- West end: Princes Street; Fitzroy, Melbourne
- Nicholson Street; Brunswick Street; Queens Parade; Hoddle Street
- East end: Eastern Freeway; Collingwood, Melbourne

Location(s)
- Major suburbs: Collingwood, Fitzroy

Highway system
- Highways in Australia; National Highway • Freeways in Australia; Highways in Victoria

Eastern Highway is a 1.2 kilometre highway in inner northern Melbourne, Australia, that ultimately acts as a feeder road into Eastern Freeway. This name however is not widely known to most drivers, as the allocation is still best known by the name of its sole constituent part: Alexandra Parade.

== Route ==
Eastern Highway commences at the intersection with Nicholson Street and Princes Streets in Fitzroy as Alexandra Parade along a wide dual-carriageway alignment, varying between eight and ten lanes, heading east across Brunswick Street, before terminating shortly after at Gold Street in Collingwood; the alignment skews into Eastern Freeway and continues east beyond, along with ramps for access to/from Hoddle Street 350m further east.

== History ==
The passing of the Highways and Vehicles Act 1924 through the Parliament of Victoria provided for the declaration of State Highways, roads two-thirds financed by the state government through the Country Roads Board (later VicRoads). Eastern Highway was declared a State Highway in October 1977, along Alexandra Parade from Nicholson Street in Fitzroy to Gold Street in Collingwood, but was still referenced on local signage as Alexandra Parade.

Alexandra Parade previously extended a short distance east beyond Hoddle Street, under the Whittlesea railway line to end at Dights Falls on the Yarra River: with the opening of the first stage of the Eastern Freeway in December 1977, Alexandra Parade was truncated back to Gold Street. A vestigial alignment partially survives as Alexandra Parade East, running parallel to the eastbound entry ramp.

Alexandra Parade was signed as Metropolitan Route 83 between Fitzroy and Collingwood in 1989; it previously continued east along Eastern Freeway until it was replaced by route M3 when EastLink opened in 2008. Metropolitan Route 46 runs concurrent along Alexandra Parade, between Nicholson Street and Queens Parade through Fitzroy North, signed from 1965.

The passing of the Road Management Act 2004 granted the responsibility of overall management and development of Victoria's major arterial roads to VicRoads: in 2004, VicRoads re-declared Eastern Highway (Arterial #6830) between Nicholson and Gold Streets. The road is still presently known (and signposted) as Alexandra Parade along its entire length.

== Major intersections ==
LGA	Location	km	mi	Destinations	Notes
Melbourne–Yarra boundary	Carlton–Carlton North–Fitzroy–Fitzroy North quadripoint	0.0	0.0	Princes Street (Metro Routes 46/83) – North Melbourne, Flemington	Western terminus of highway, Metro Routes 46/83 continue west along Princes Street; Western end of Alexandra Parade
Melbourne–Yarra boundary	Carlton–Carlton North–Fitzroy–Fitzroy North quadripoint	0.0	0.0	Nicholson Street – Coburg, Brunswick East, City	
Yarra	Fitzroy–Fitzroy North boundary	0.3	0.19	Brunswick Street (Metro Route 45) – East Melbourne, Preston, Reservoir	
Yarra	Fitzroy–Fitzroy North boundary	0.4	0.25	Queens Parade (Metro Route 46) – Heidelberg, Greensborough, Hurstbridge	One way, eastbound entry only
Yarra	Fitzroy–Fitzroy North boundary	0.6	0.37	George Street (Metro Route 46) – Heidelberg, Greensborough, Hurstbridge	One way, westbound exit from Queens Parade only
Yarra	Collingwood–Clifton Hill boundary	1.2	0.75	Gold Street – Collingwood, Clifton Hill, to Hoddle Street (Metro Route 29) – Northcote, Reservoir, Epping	Westbound entry and exit, and eastbound exit and entry, to Gold Street only Access to Hoddle Street 400m further east via ramps
Yarra	Collingwood–Clifton Hill boundary	1.2	0.75	Eastern Freeway (M3) – Doncaster, Ringwood, Frankston	Eastern terminus of highway and Metro Route 83
1.000 mi = 1.609 km; 1.000 km = 0.621 mi: Incomplete access; Route transition

== See also ==
- List of Melbourne highways
