= Deutsche Schule Melbourne =

Bilingual school in Fitzroy North, Melbourne, Australia

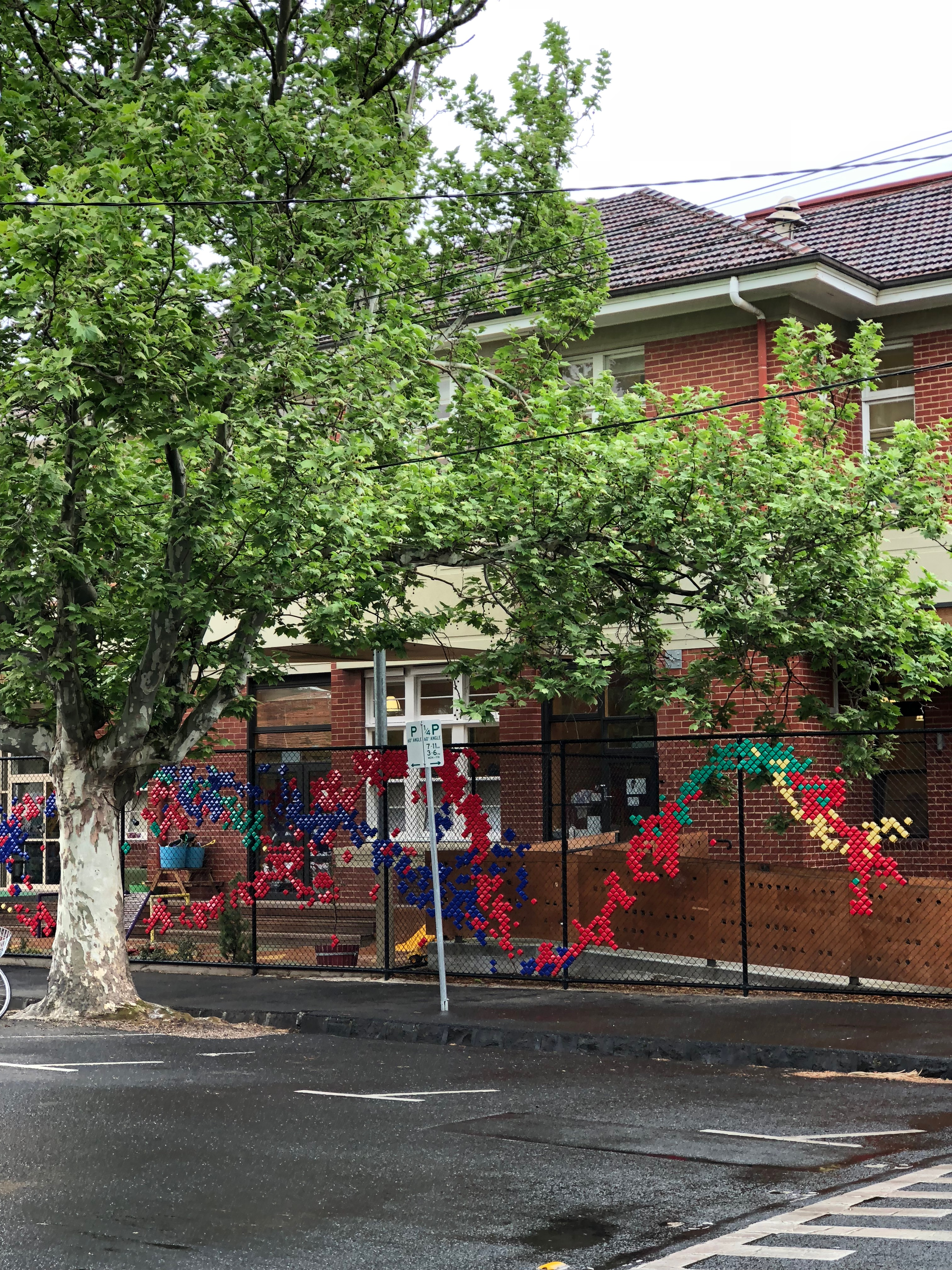

Location
- Fitzroy North, Melbourne, Victoria; Australia; 37.779081°S 144.982914°E

Information
- Type: Independent co-educational school
- Opened: 2008
- Grades: Prep to year 6
- Website: www.dsm.org.au/en/

Deutsche Schule Melbourne (DSM) is an accredited German School Abroad which opened in 2008. The school offers bilingual education for primary school children up to Year 6 and is in Fitzroy North, a northern suburb of Melbourne, Victoria, Australia.

== History ==
DSM was established in 2008 on the site of the former St Joseph's College, which was the earliest founding school of Samaritan Catholic College.

== School model ==
Teaching is based on a one teacher-one language approach, in which teachers only conduct classes in their native-language, be it German or English. All teachers at DSM are bilingual in English and German. The curriculum of Deutsche Schule Melbourne fulfills the requirements of both the Victorian Essential Learning Standards and Thuringia curricula. Students learn to read and write in German and English concurrently. In Year 1 and 2, 80% of classes are taught in German. The proportion of classes taught in English gradually increases so that by Year 6 it will amount to approximately 50% of teaching time.

== See also ==
- List of schools in Victoria
- German Australians
