= St Georges Road =

Road in Melbourne, Victoria

St Georges Road (State (St Georges) Highway) Victoria
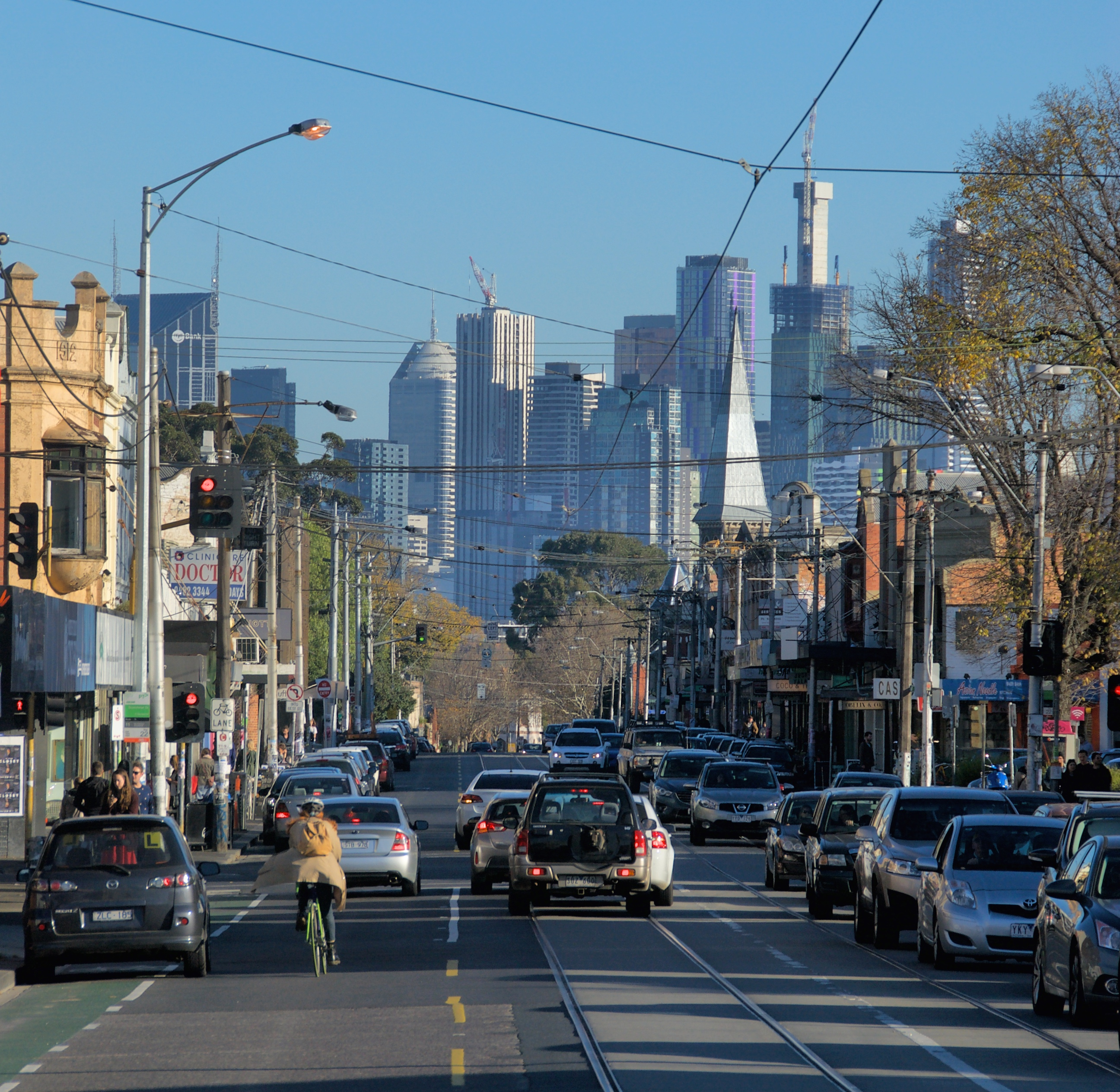
- St Georges Road in Fitzroy North
- Coordinates: 37.737553°S 144.999774°E (North end); 37.787570°S 144.980340°E (South end)

General information
- Type: Road
- Length: 5.9 km (3.7 mi)
- Route number(s): Metro Route 45 (1989–present) Entire route; Concurrencies: Metro Route 38 (1965–present) (Merri Parade to Holden Street)

Major junctions
- North end: Spring Street; Preston, Melbourne
- Murray Road; Bell Street; Normanby Avenue; Merri Parade; Holden Street
- South end: Brunswick Street; Fitzroy North, Melbourne

Location(s)
- Major suburbs: Thornbury, Northcote

St Georges Road is a main road in the inner northern suburbs of Melbourne, which passes through the suburbs of Fitzroy North, Northcote, Thornbury and Preston.

== Route ==
St Georges Road starts at the intersection with Murray Road and Spring Street in Preston along a wide dual-carriageway alignment, varying between four and six lanes, heading south to cross Bell Street until meeting Murray Street in Thornbury, where a tram line branches from both Murray Street and the adjacent Preston Workshops to run in a dedicated median in the middle of the road. It continues south through Northcote until it reaches Merri Parade, where it narrows to a four-lane, single-carriageway road, sharing surface tram tracks. Running south-west, it crosses Merri Creek through Fitzroy North until it ends upon reaching Brunswick Street. Its former south-westward course is continued by a much smaller residential street named St Georges Road South, running south-west until it reaches Nicholson Street.

Northcote High School is situated on St Georges Road. Located nearby is Merri Creek Primary School. Some small shopping areas are located along the road.

== History ==
The Country Roads Board (later VicRoads) declared St Georges Road a Main Road in June 1983, from Epping Road at Reservoir along Spring Street to Murray Road in Preston, and then along St Georges Road proper to Merri Creek at Northcote; all roads were known (and signposted) as their constituent parts.

St Georges Road was signed as Metropolitan Route 45 between Preston and Fitzroy North in 1989. Metropolitan Route 38 runs concurrent along St Georges Road from Merri Parade at Northcote to Holden Street at Fitzroy North from 1965.

The passing of the Transport Act 1983 (itself an evolution from the original Highways and Vehicles Act 1924) provided for the declaration of State Highways, roads two-thirds financed by the state government through the Road Construction Authority (later VicRoads). The State Highway (St Georges Road) was declared a State Highway in December 1990, from Bell Street at Preston and ending at Merri Parade in Northcote; the road was known (and signposted) as St Georges Road along its entire length. The section between Epping Road in Reservoir and Bell Street in Preston remained a declared Main Road, still known (and signposted) as their constituent parts.

In the early 1990s, the tram tracks from Merri Place to Miller Street were rebuilt in a dedicated reservation.

The passing of the Road Management Act 2004 granted the responsibility of overall management and development of Victoria's major arterial roads to VicRoads. In 2004, VicRoads declared the road as State (St Georges) Highway (Arterial #6130), beginning at Bell Street in Preston and ending at Merri Parade in Northcote, while re-declaring the road from Merri Parade over Merri Creek as St Georges Road Bridge (Arterial #5878), and the remnants between Preston and Fitzroy North as St Georges Road (Arterial #5861). As before, the road is still known and signposted as St Georges Road along its entire length. The section along Spring Street between Reservoir and Preston was separated and declared Spring Street (Arterial #5892).

Until the mid-2009 there was a large roundabout at the intersection of St Georges Road, Merri Parade and Charles Street which has been replaced with traffic lights. In 2017 Melbourne Water renewed the pipes that run beneath the central reservation as part of the Preston Reservoir to Merri Creek Water Main Renewal Project. This required 80 palm trees to be removed and stored off-site before being replanted.

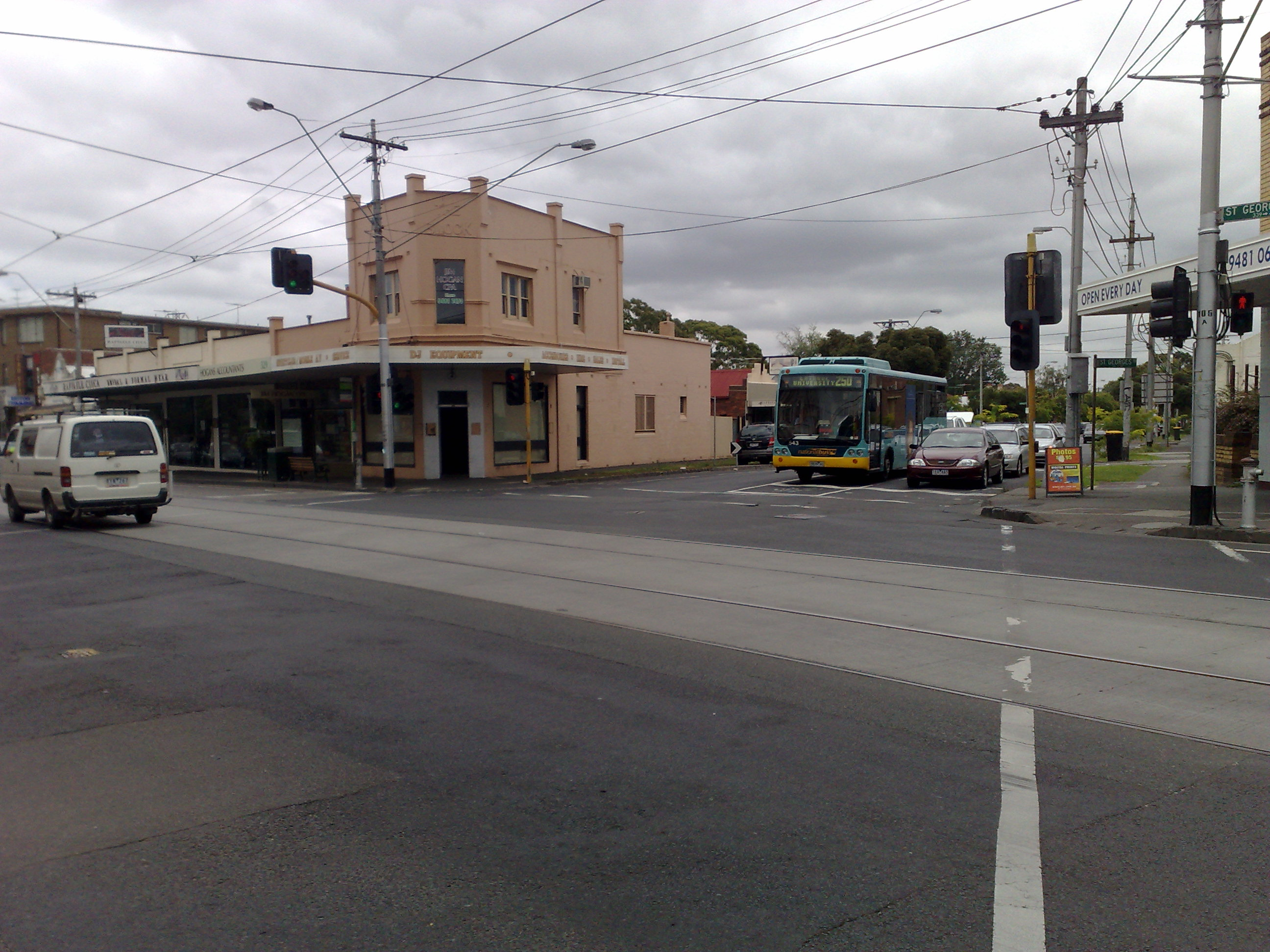

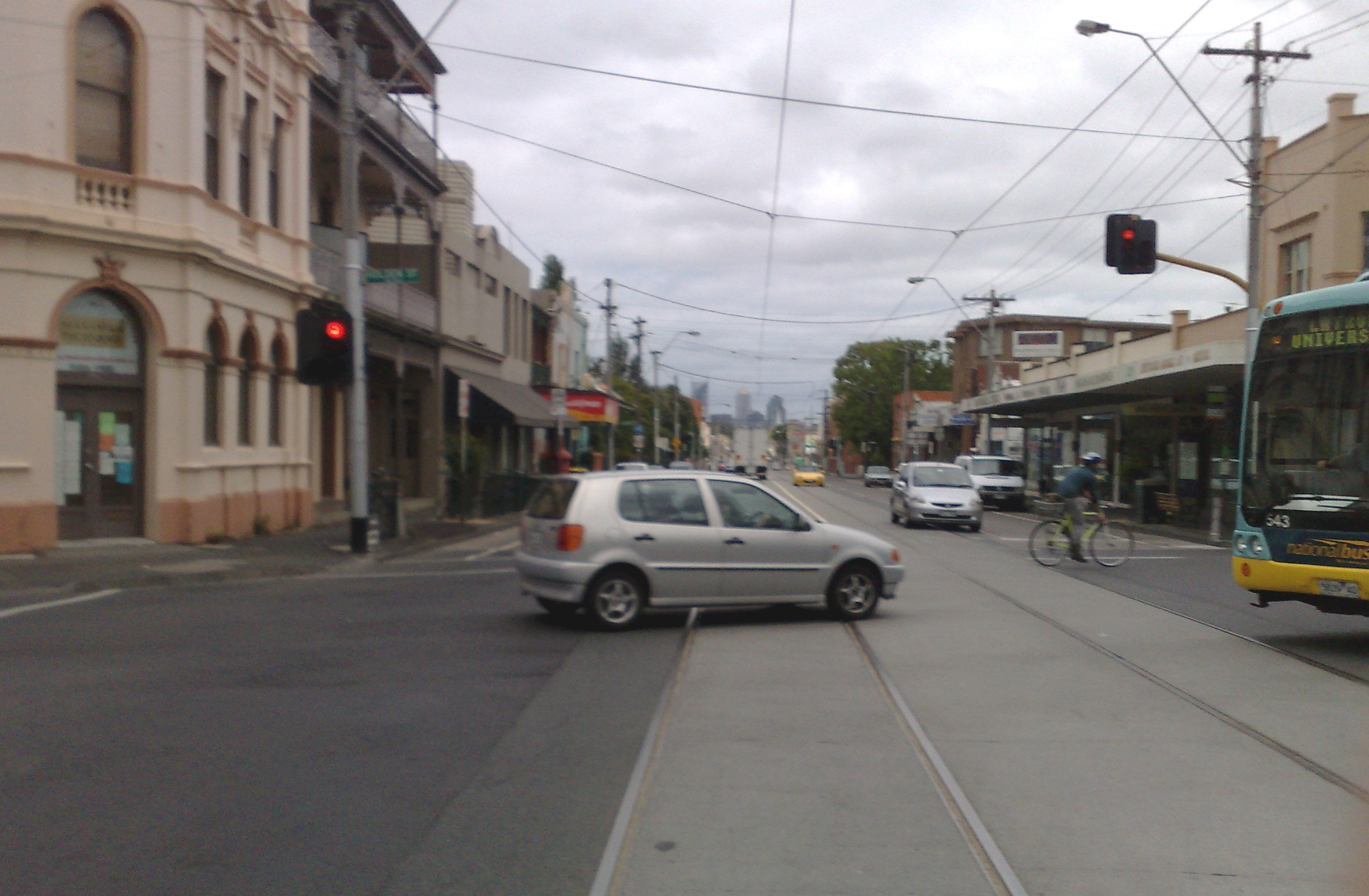
