= Fitzroy North Primary School =

Coordinates: 37.7856°S 144.983°E

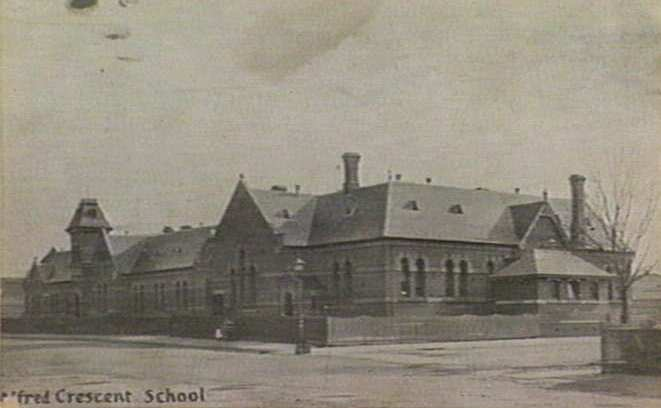
- The school, pictured as the Alfred Crescent School, c. 1908

Location
- 9–11 Alfred Crescent; Fitzroy North; Melbourne, Victoria; Australia

Information
- Former name: Alfred Crescent School
- Type: State primary school
- Established: 1875; 151 years ago
- Years: Prep–6
- Website: fitzroynthps.vic.edu.au

Fitzroy North Primary School (No. 1490) is a state school in the inner-city suburb of Fitzroy North in Melbourne, Australia. The school is one of the oldest schools in Melbourne.

There are approximately 490 students. A mid-high proportion, less than one third of students, have language other than English backgrounds.

== History ==
The Fitzroy North Primary School No. 1490 was constructed in 1875. Opened in 1875, Fitzroy North Primary School was known as Alfred Crescent School.

The average class size in 2008 was 25.2, with Prep–2 average being 24.8.

The school's Out of School Hours Care is fully registered under the National Child Care Accreditation.
