= George Brunswick Smyth =

George Brunswick Smyth (1815–1845) was a British Army officer and early settler in the Port Phillip District, now part of Melbourne in the state of Victoria. Born in London, he was the son of George Stracey Smyth and Amelia Ann Cantelo. In 1831, at the age of 17, he joined the 4th Regiment of Foot as an ensign and was promoted to lieutenant in 1833.

== Career ==
In 1839, Smyth arrived in the Port Phillip District, where he played a significant role in the early colonial administration. He served as the officer-in-charge of the Port Phillip military police and was one of five founding members of the Melbourne Cricket Club, established in 1838. Smyth was also a member of the Melbourne Club, reflecting his integration into the social fabric of the burgeoning colonial settlement.

Smyth engaged in land transactions, purchasing and subdividing land in the area now known as Fitzroy in 1839. In that same year, Smyth married Constantia Matthews Alexander at St James Church in Melbourne. The couple returned to England in 1841. At the age of 30, Smyth passed away in Lewisham, London in 1845. According to the Melbourne Cricket Club, no drawing, painting or photo of him is known to exist.

== Legacy ==
Smyth's contributions to early Melbourne society, particularly in law enforcement and community organisations, mark him as a notable figure in the city's colonial history. Brunswick Street, a vibrant street in the suburb of Fitzroy is believed to be named after him.
