= Brunswick Street, Melbourne =

Street in Melbourne, Australia

Coordinates: 37°47′54″S 144°58′42.5″E

Brunswick Street Victoria
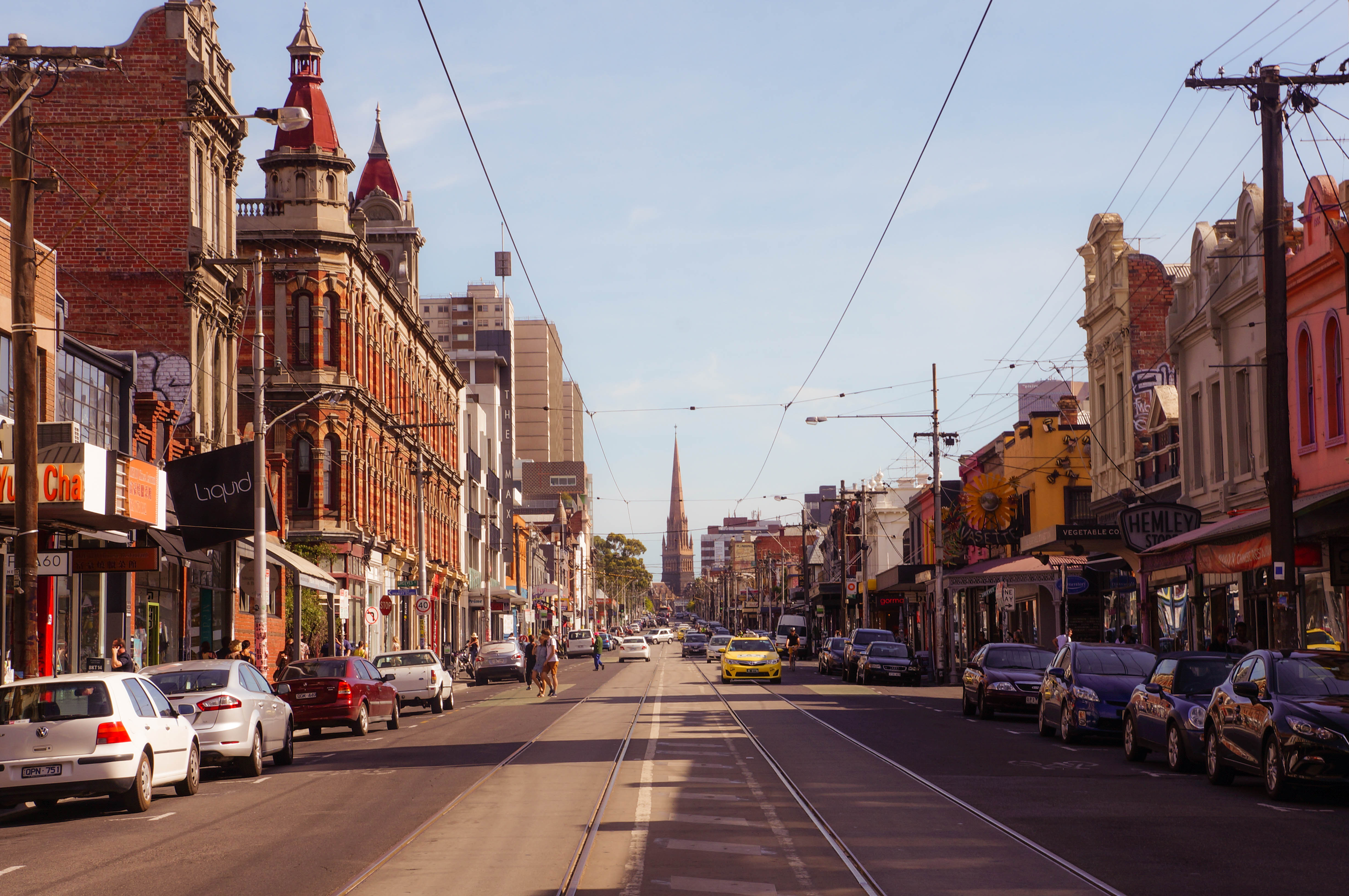
- Brunswick Street as it runs through Fitzroy

General information
- Type: Street
- Length: 2.4 km (1.5 mi)
- Route number(s): Metro Route 45 (1989–present)

Major junctions
- North end: St Georges Road; Fitzroy North, Melbourne
- Alexandra Parade; Johnston Street; Gertrude Street
- South end: Victoria Parade; Fitzroy, Melbourne

Brunswick Street is a street in inner northern Melbourne, known for cafés, live music venues and alternative fashion shops.

== Route ==
Brunswick Street runs north–south through the inner northern Melbourne suburbs of Fitzroy and Fitzroy North, from Victoria Parade at its southernmost end, crossing Gertrude Street and Alexandra Parade through Fitzroy, and north continuing until it reaches St Georges Road in Fitzroy North, near the Edinburgh Gardens; there, its former northward course is continued by a much smaller residential street named Brunswick Street North.

Tram route 11 (West Preston to Victoria Harbour) runs along the entire length of Brunswick Street.

== History ==
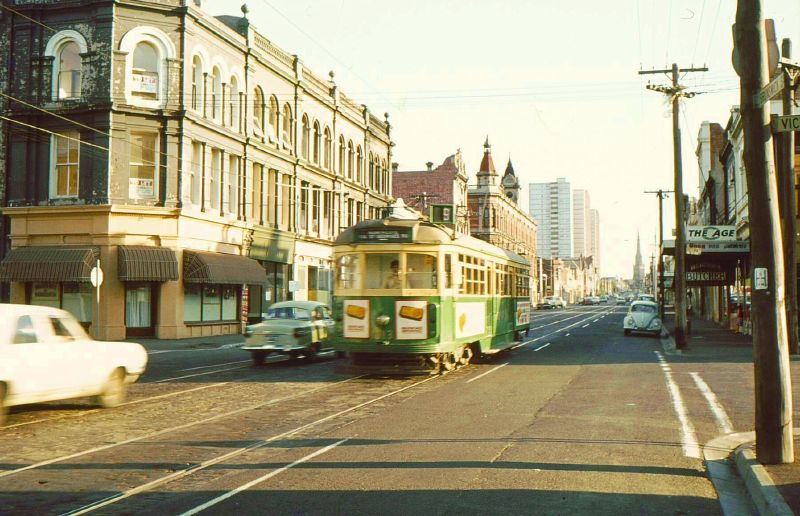
A tram on route 11 travels down Brunswick Street, 1979.

Brunswick Street, believed to be named after Captain George Brunswick Smyth, owes its origins to Benjamin Baxter, who owned land along Victoria Parade in the recently proclaimed township of Newtown (now Fitzroy South). Baxter owned Crown Allotment 49, which was adjacent to Allotment 48 at the northwest corner of the government roads Victoria Parade and Nicholson Street. In 1839 Baxter subdivided his land into quarters, creating roads between the subdivisions. These became Brunswick Street and Gertrude Street. Initially Brunswick Street only ran as far as what is now Hanover Street, Fitzroy. In 1840, Mr Robert Saunders Webb subdivided Crown Allotment 70, to the north of Baxter's land. This extended Brunswick Street further north to Bell Street (originally known as Hamburg Street). The street was officially proclaimed in 1851, by which time it extended as far as Reilly Street (now Alexandra Parade), at that stage an incomplete open drain.

In 1867 allotments in the cleared scrubland to the north of Reilly Street were put up for sale. The Government survey plan included a road in the same alignment as Brunswick Street leading to a cricket ground reserve to the north, but it was unnamed. During residential development in the 1870s, this road became known as Harker Street and was extended as far north as today's Holden Street. In 1876 Harker Street changed its name to Brunswick Street North, but by 1900 the wide Government section south of St Georges Road had dropped the 'North' in its title while the remainder, narrower and offset from the main road due to its formation by private land subdivisions, retained the name Brunswick Street North.

Shops had appeared in the southern end of Brunswick Street as early as the 1840s and by 1854 the strip rivaled Bourke Street as a shopping district.

After World War II, large numbers of immigrants (principally from Mediterranean Europe) settled in the inner suburbs of Melbourne, including Fitzroy. Among them, there were many Italians, who in turn imported espresso machines and established the foundations of Melbourne's café culture. Building on these foundations and established in 1986, Mario's Cafe is an iconic venue on Brunswick street serving both coffee and Italian cuisine.

For some decades, the suburb of Fitzroy was a working-class area of low rents and cheap shops. This area began to attract students, artists, and bohemians. The T. F. Much Ballroom commenced in Cathedral Hall (now called Central Hall, just opposite St Vincents Hospital, in Brunswick Street, in 1970. The T. F. Much was the heart of Melbourne's music scene and saw stand out performances by Daddy Cool, Spectrum (and Murtceps), Carson, Capt Matchbox as well as several of Joe Camilleri's earlier incarnations.

In the 1980s, 3RRR established its studios in Victoria Street, off Brunswick Street, the Punters Club established itself as a significant live music venue, as did the Evelyn Hotel, and independent record shop PolyEster Records opened. These businesses cemented Brunswick Street's status as a nexus of Melbourne's indie music and post punk/new-wave subcultures, which in turn drew in waves of suburban tourists in their teens and 20s. Brunswick Street also served as the home base for integral techno/electronic label/promoter IF? Records, from 1994 to 2001.

Gentrification was not long in following, though the economic recession of the 1990s slowed it somewhat. One by one, the few remaining regular shops closed and were replaced by cafés, fashion boutiques, and bars, a shift that has played a large role in Fitzroy being named one of the most unique neighbourhoods in the world in 2016. The Punters Club closed in 2002 (however it would reopen in 2024), and 3RRR has relocated further out to Brunswick.

From the start of the 21st century, Brunswick Street has become home to artisans, young professionals, and baby boomers with retirement savings.

=== Road classification ===
Brunswick Street was signed as Metropolitan Route 45 between Fitzroy and Fitzroy North, in 1989, continuing north along St Georges Road.

The passing of the Road Management Act 2004 granted the responsibility of overall management and development of Victoria's major arterial roads to VicRoads: in 2004, VicRoads re-declared the road as Brunswick Street (Arterial #5114), from St Georges Road to Alexandra Parade through Fitzroy, the remainder of the road to Victoria Parade remains undeclared.

== In popular culture ==
Helen Garner's novel Monkey Grip (1977) featured locations set in and around Brunswick Street, including the Fitzroy Swimming Pool on Alexandra Parade. Brunswick Street has also been used in the filming of many local Melbourne-based television series, such as Offspring and Rush. A song based on the streets' reputation features on English singer-songwriter Kiran Leonard's debut album 'Bowler Hat Soup'.

== Major intersections ==
Brunswick Street is entirely contained within the City of Yarra local government area.

Location	km	mi	Destinations	Notes
Fitzroy North	0.0	0.0	St Georges Road (Metro Route 45) – Preston, Reservoir	Northern terminus of street (declared and sign-posted), Metro Route 45 continues northeast along St Georges Road
Fitzroy North	0.0	0.0	St Georges Road South, Carlton North	South-westbound entrance to and exit from St Georges Road South northbound only
Fitzroy North–Fitzroy border	0.6	0.37	Alexandra Parade – Carlton, Footscray, Clifton Hill	Southern terminus of street (declared)
Fitzroy	1.2	0.75	Johnston Street – Carlton, Ringwood, Lilydale	
Fitzroy	2.1	1.3	Gertrude Street – Fitzroy	
Fitzroy	2.4	1.5	Victoria Parade – Footscray, Camberwell, Montrose	Southern terminus of street (sign-posted) and Metro Route 45
1.000 mi = 1.609 km; 1.000 km = 0.621 mi: Incomplete access; Route transition
