= Gertrude Street =

Street in Melbourne, Victoria

Gertrude Street Victoria
- Coordinates: 37.805380°S 144.973618°E (West end); 37.806371°S 144.982989°E (East end)

General information
- Type: Street
- Length: 850 m (0.5 mi)

Major junctions
- West end: Nicholson Street; Carlton, Melbourne
- Brunswick Street; Smith Street
- East end: Langridge Street; Collingwood, Melbourne

Location(s)
- Major suburbs: Fitzroy

Gertrude Street is a street in the inner northern suburb of Fitzroy, Melbourne, Australia.

== History ==
The Aboriginal Health Service opened on Gertrude Street in 1973, co-founded by Alma Thorpe, her mother Edna Brown, and Bruce McGuinness. It provided a service largely provided by volunteers, operating as a de facto community centre there until 1992. A nearby street behind a factory was a meeting and drinking place, known to the community as Charcoal Lane. The whole area is significant to Aboriginal Australians, many of whom spent time there from the 1960s to the 1980s after leaving missions, Aboriginal reserves, and other government institutions and drifted to the city in a bid to trace their families.

Gentrification of the area, which had started in the 1980s, continued into the 2000s, with Gertrude Street being transformed into a string of fine dining restaurants, art galleries, bookshops and fashion stores.

In 2009 the Aboriginal Health Service building at 136 Gertrude Street was converted into a social enterprise restaurant called Charcoal Lane, run by Mission Australia, which provided training for Aboriginal and Torres Strait Islander young people and became well known for its gastronomy. It closed its doors in August 2021, during the COVID-19 pandemic, and the historic building was handed back to the Victorian Aboriginal Health Service (VAHS).

In 2022 Gertrude Street was voted "the second coolest street in the world" by 20,000 people polled by Time Out. Locals also refer to it as "Little Hollywood".

== Description ==
Cafes, bars, eateries, boutiques, antiques shops, bookshops, many social services and a few art galleries (including Gertrude Contemporary Art Spaces) are located along the street, which runs along an east–west alignment from Nicholson Street opposite the Royal Exhibition Building in the Carlton Gardens to Smith Street.

Film production studios such as Banalarama and KEWL Studios are located on the section between Brunswick Street and Nicholson Street.

The street continues east of Smith Street, under the name of Langridge Street, where it terminates at Nicholson Street, Abbotsford.

== Transport ==
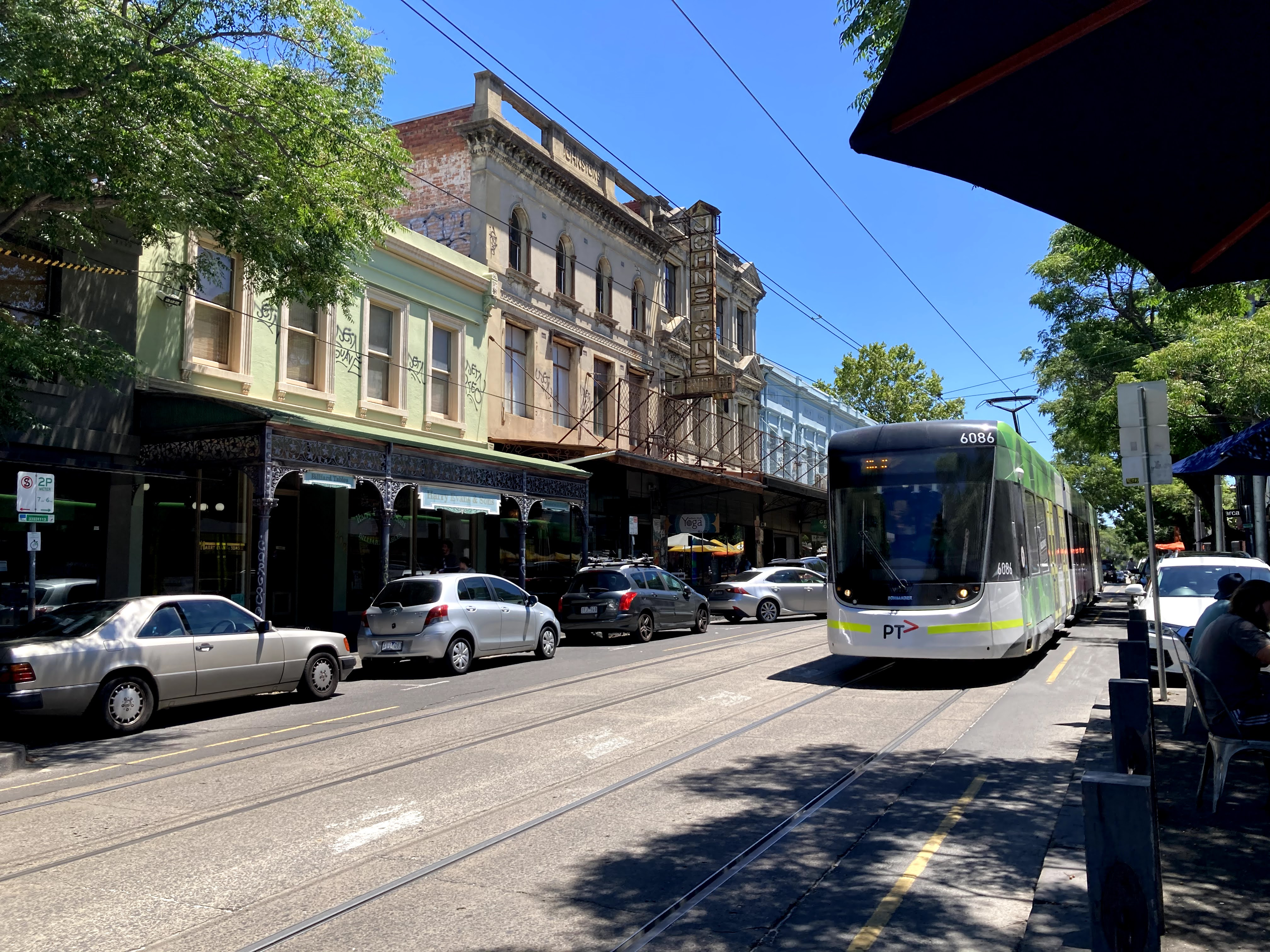
A tram on Gertrude Street in 2020

Melbourne tram route 86 runs along the entire length of Gertrude Street, and it is intersected by route 96 and route 11 at Nicholson Street and Brunswick Street respectively.

== Landmarks ==
Landmarks on Gertrude Street include:

- The Champion Hotel, on the corner of Gertrude and Brunswick Streets
- The Builders Arms Hotel, a pub (c.1850s), on the corner of Gertrude and Gore Streets; the only hotel that allowed Aboriginal Australians to drink there in the 1960s to 1980s
- The MMTB building, on the corner of Gertrude and Nicholson Streets
- The Rob Roy Hotel, on the corner of Gertrude and Brunswick Streets
- The Australian Print Workshop, opposite the Builders Arms Hotel; operating out of its present location since the late 1980s, purchasing the building in early 2006 after the death of its owner in late 2005

== In popular culture ==
Archie Roach's song "Charcoal Lane" mentions Gertrude Street.
