= Nicholson Street =

Street in Melbourne, Victoria

Nicholson Street Victoria
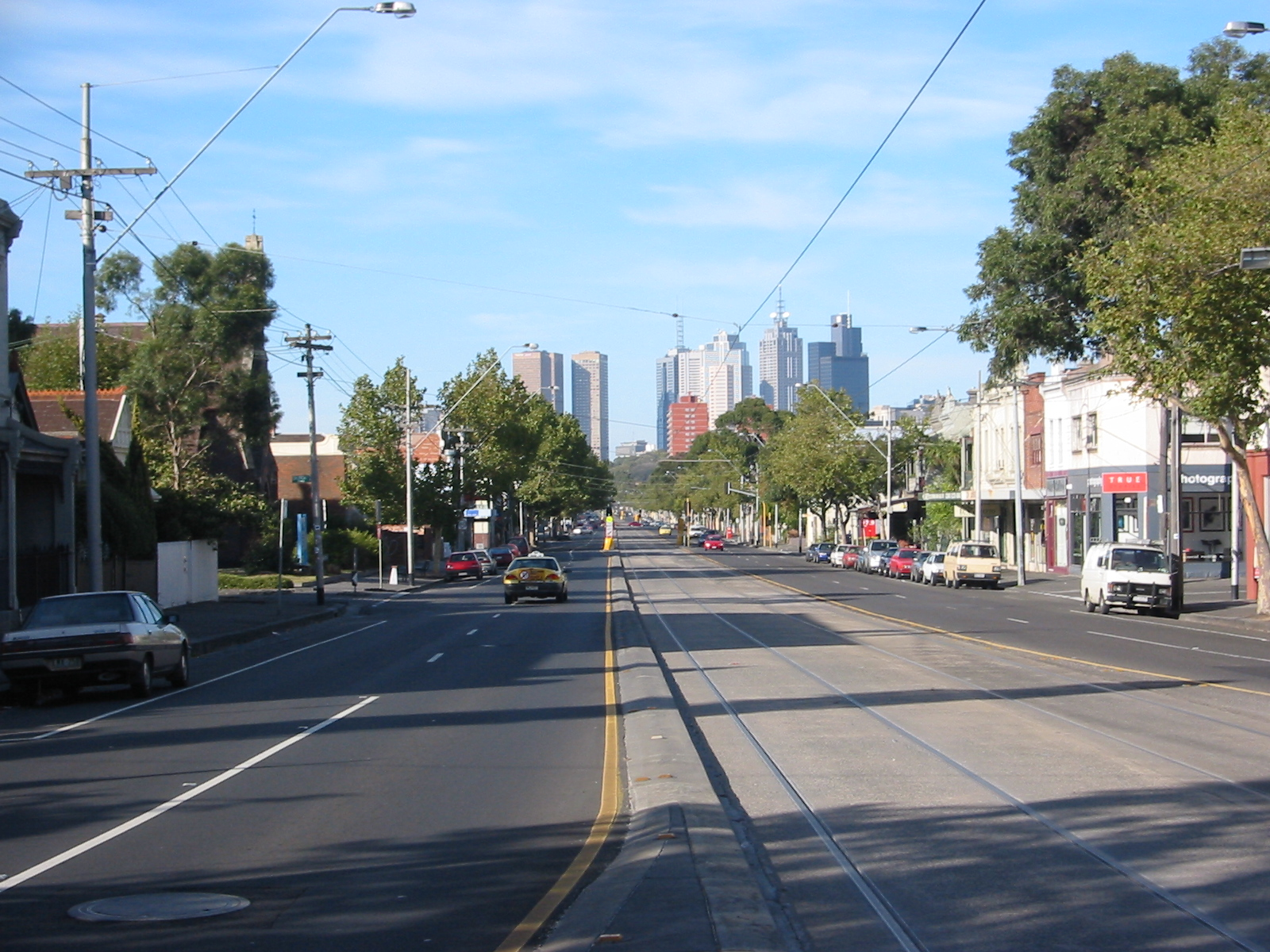
- Nicholson Street, looking towards the city
- Coordinates: 37.762734°S 144.979214°E (North end); 37.810819°S 144.972832°E (South end)

General information
- Type: Street
- Length: 5.4 km (3.4 mi)

Major junctions
- North end: Albion Street; Brunswick East, Melbourne
- Blyth Street; Brunswick Road; Alexandra Parade; Johnston Street; Gertrude Street; Victoria Parade
- South end: Spring Street; Fitzroy, Melbourne

Nicholson Street is a street in inner Melbourne. It is named after William Nicholson, who is remembered as the "father of the ballot". He was also a member of the Legislative Council, and later became Premier of Victoria (from 1859-1860).

== Geography ==
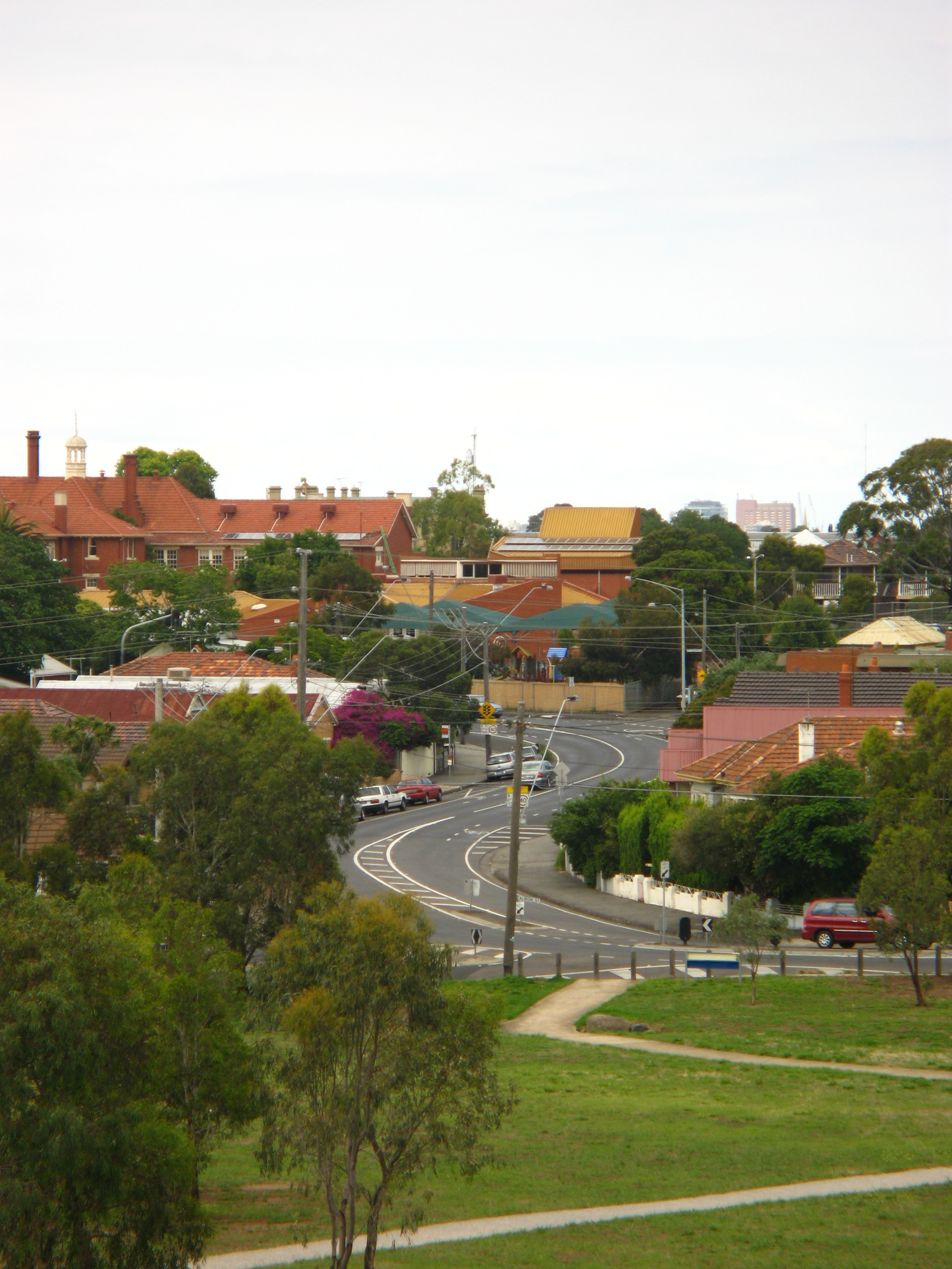
The series of bends at the northern end of Nicholson Street in Brunswick East

Nicholson Street runs north-south through inner northern Melbourne. At its southernmost end, it connects to Spring Street near Bourke Street. Between Victoria Parade and Alexandra Parade, it forms the boundary between Carlton and Fitzroy; between Alexandra Parade and Brunswick Road, it forms the boundary between Carlton North and Fitzroy North; north of Brunswick Road, its remaining length is in Brunswick East. Nicholson Street merges into Albion Street, Brunswick East, just north of its intersection with Blyth Street.

Nicholson Street, Brunswick East, is often confused with nearby Nicholson Street, Coburg, which also runs north to south. Nicholson Street, Coburg, is a continuation of Holmes Street, which is a continuation of Lygon Street; itself not to be confused with the much smaller Lygon Street in Coburg.

== Route ==
Nicholson Street runs from Spring Street in the city, and heads in a north-northeasterly direction for approximately 5 km, before it runs through a series of 3 bends for 500m before merging into Albion Street in Brunswick East, to the north.

Tram route 96 runs along virtually the entire length of the street, entering from Spring Street at the city end and terminating at Blyth Street, just a few hundred metres short of the street's end.

== History ==
Nicholson Street was built in 1854 to provide a road from Melbourne to the stone quarries of Brunswick East. It initially ended at Brunswick Road. Residents to the north of Brunswick Road had to travel west to Sydney Road in order to travel into Melbourne, adding several miles to the journey. These residents began a public campaign to have Nicholson Street extended to the north. Two land owners sold their land at inflated prices in order for the extension to go ahead, which happened in 1868.

Nicholson Street has been known by several names. It was originally known as West Government Road. Also, one section of Nicholson Street between Spring Street and Victoria Parade was originally known as Evelyn Street.

In 2013, Public Transport Victoria proposed changed traffic conditions to much of the street by enforcing dedicated tram lanes along the length of Route 96, which would result in the removal of all on-street parking in favour of through traffic lanes and less delays for trams.

== Landmarks ==
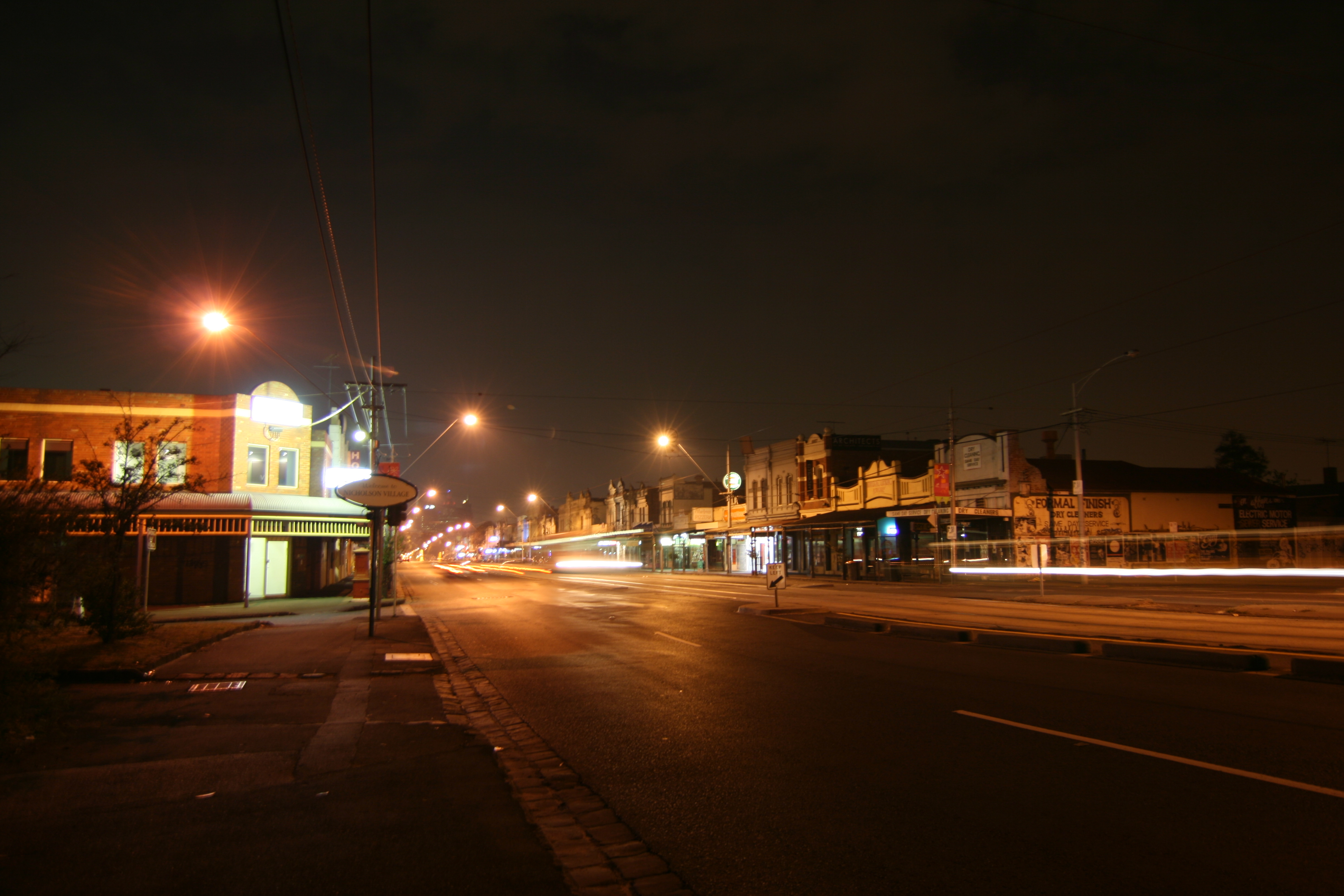
Nicholson Street at night

Several Melbourne landmarks are located on Nicholson Street, including Parliament House and the Princess Theatre at its southern terminus. Just to the north lie the Royal Exhibition Building and the Melbourne Museum, both in Carlton Gardens, and St Vincent's Hospital. Melbourne's oldest complete row of terraced house, known as Royal Terrace, is located at 50-68 in Fitzroy. Further north in Brunswick East, at the corner of Blyth Street, Melbourne alternative radio station 3RRR makes its home.
