= Fitzroy North =

- Suburb
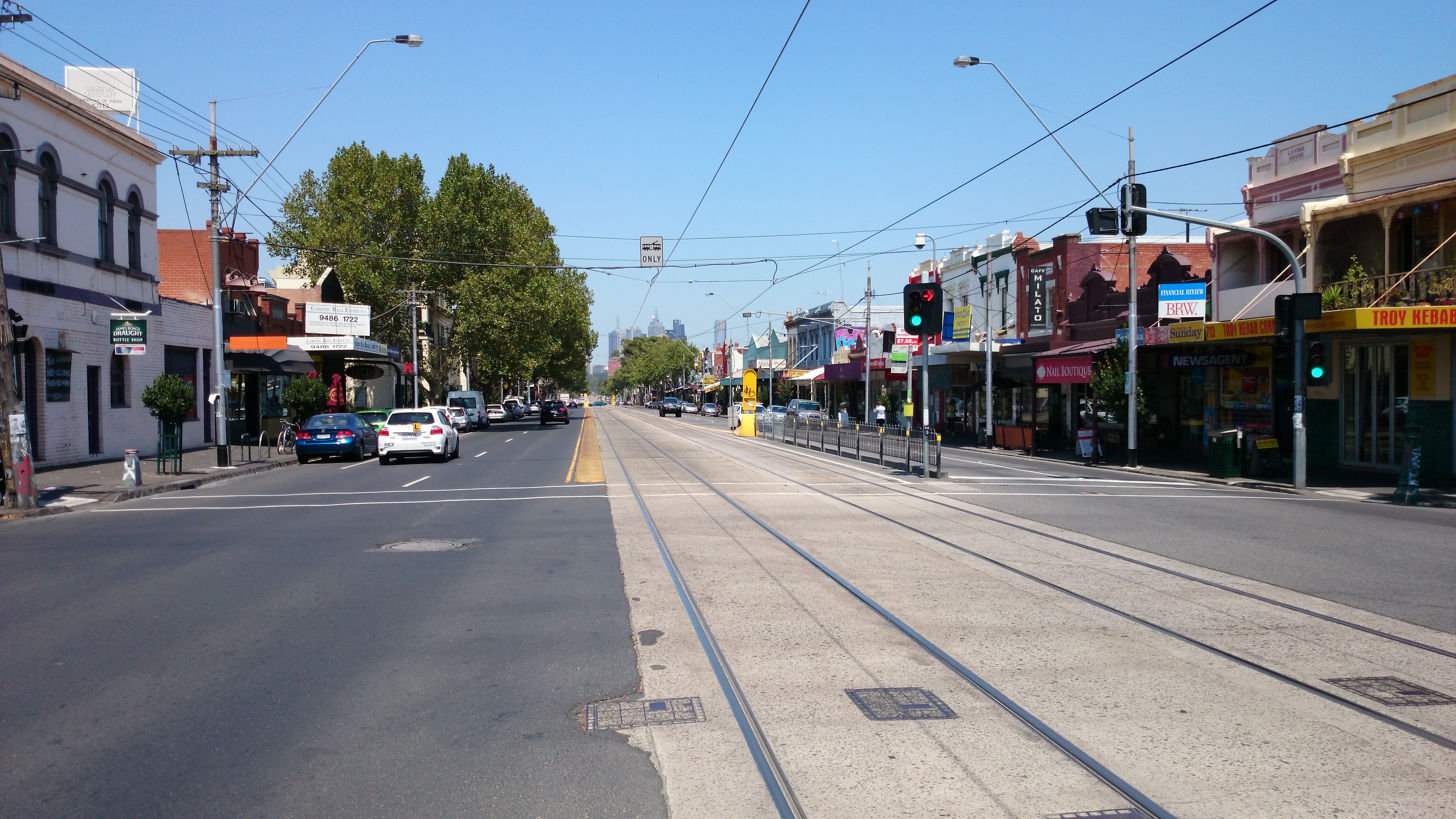
- View of Nicholson Street facing the Central Business District

- Interactive map of Fitzroy North
- Coordinates: 37.784°S 144.986°E
- Country: Australia
- State: Victoria
- City: Melbourne
- LGAs: City of Merri-bek; City of Yarra
- Location: 4 km (2.5 mi) NE of Melbourne

Government
  - State electorates: Brunswick; Richmond
  - Federal division: Wills

Area
  - Total: 2.4 km^{2} (0.93 sq mi)
- Elevation: 38 m (125 ft)

Population
  - Total: 12,781 (SAL 2021)
- Postcode: 3068
Suburbs around Fitzroy North
Brunswick East	Brunswick East	Northcote
Carlton North	Fitzroy North	Clifton Hill
Carlton	Fitzroy	Collingwood

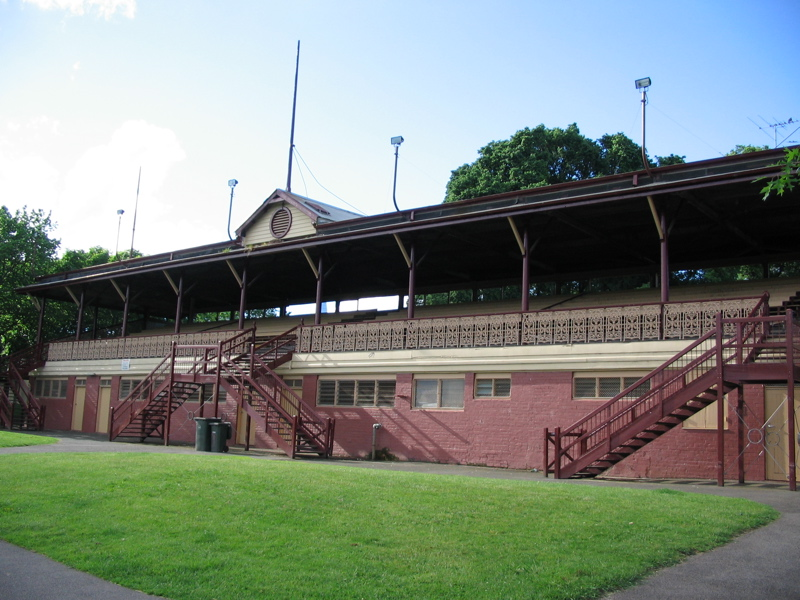
The grandstand at the W. T. Peterson Community Oval, built 1888

Fitzroy North is an inner-city suburb in Melbourne, Victoria, Australia, 4 km (2.5 mi) north-east of the Melbourne central business district, located within the Cities of Merri-bek and Yarra local government areas. Fitzroy North recorded a population of 12,781 at the 2021 census.

Also referred to as North Fitzroy in reference to its southern neighbour, Fitzroy North has a distinct character, noted for its prevalence of wide streets, intact Victorian and Edwardian era terraced housing and for the Edinburgh Gardens, a large inner-city park formerly home to the Fitzroy Football Club. Fitzroy North is adjacent to, and shares a postcode and neighbourhood character with Clifton Hill, both being government subdivisions set on elevated ground and to the same layout by Clement Hodgkinson in the 1870s, and distinct from the earlier narrow and more crowded private subdivisions in the lower lying areas of Fitzroy and Collingwood to the south.

== History ==
- Edinburgh Gardens is created from a grant of land in March 1862
- Fitzroy North Post Office opened on 2 February 1874.
- Fitzroy North Primary School opened in 1875.
- On 9 August 1987 the Hoddle Street massacre occurred in Fitzroy North and adjacent Clifton Hill.

== Today ==
Housing stock includes many fine one and two storey terraces, many dating to the late Victorian period and including characteristic ironwork, verandahs, and stone embellishments. This is one of Melbourne's finest and most expensive inner-city locations. John McMahon, twice elected Mayor of Fitzroy built, firstly in 1886, two townhouses at 53/55 Alfred Crescent, and then in 1890 a large and impressive mansion which he called "Avonmore" at 75 Alfred Crescent. Both were designed by Olaf Nicholson, the architect. On one side of the crescent is a large park, overlooked by John's and other houses called Edinburgh Gardens, with a famous football oval, bordered by Freeman Street, Brunswick Street, St Georges Road and Alfred Crescent. This park was saved for the people of Fitzroy by John McMahon, when he obtained permanent possession during his first year of Mayorship. An attempt was made by the Government of which Mr Vale was a member, to have a large portion of it excised for public housing. Mr McMahon had Minister Gaunson permanently gazette the land for the people. John also built a terrace of ten shops which he called "Gladstone Terraces" at St. Georges Road. John McMahon was also the chairman and founding president of the Fitzroy Football Club. The Brunswick Street Oval was the home ground of the Fitzroy Football Club until 1967, playing in the Victorian Football League. A linear park, incorporating a section of the Capital City Trail bike path, runs along much of the northern edge of the suburb, on the easement for the Inner Circle railway line, which closed in 1948.

== Description ==
Fitzroy North (also called North Fitzroy) is theoretically joined to Fitzroy, but in reality the two are as separate as any suburbs in the inner city. They were always bisected by the width of Alexandra Parade (earlier Reilly Street), but with the building of the Eastern Freeway in the 1970s and its connection to the Parade, the volume of traffic became an overwhelming barrier. Fitzroy North is also distinct in character, with less commercial activity, wider, quieter, leafier streets, and clear delineation to the east provided by the green Merri Creek corridor.

== Residential architecture ==
Most of Fitzroy North is single and double storey Victorian and Edwardian housing, comprising rows of terraces, with a mixture of semi-attached and freestanding houses on small to moderately sized blocks. Large parts of the suburb are protected by heritage controls. The suburb is relatively intact and consistent in character, having had far less industrial and commercial development in its formative years than its southern namesake.

Fitzroy North also has some distinctive apartment complexes, mostly built within the last 15 years. Another, on St Georges Road at Park Street, is a redevelopment of the old Fire Station, with an extension at the back reminiscent of three concrete grain silos.

== Commerce ==
The main commercial activity in Fitzroy North is on Brunswick Street, St Georges Road and the northern side of Queens Parade, the latter having particularly wide footpaths for a Melbourne commercial strip.

== Transport ==
To get to Fitzroy North from the Melbourne CBD, you can travel using the following options:

=== Bus ===
Five bus routes service Fitzroy North:

- 250 : Queen Street (Melbourne CBD) – La Trobe University Bundoora Campus. Operated by Kinetic Melbourne.
- 251 : Queen Street (Melbourne CBD) – Northland Shopping Centre. Operated by Kinetic Melbourne.
- 504 : Moonee Ponds Junction – Clifton Hill station via Brunswick East. Operated by Kinetic Melbourne.
- 506 : Moonee Ponds Junction – Westgarth station via Brunswick. Operated by Kinetic Melbourne.
- 546 : Heidelberg station – Queen Victoria Market via Clifton Hill, Carlton and the University of Melbourne. Operated by Kinetic Melbourne.

Kinetic Melbourne's Fitzroy North bus depots is located within the suburb on Nicholson Street, adjacent to the former tram depot.

=== Train ===
One railway station services Fitzroy North: Rushall station, on the Mernda line. Rushall station is located on Rushall Crescent, in the north east of the suburb.

=== Tram ===
Three tram routes service Fitzroy North:

- from Collins Street, along Brunswick Street and St Georges Road.
- from Bourke Street, which also travels a short distance along Nicholson Street, turns at Gertrude Street, turns again into Smith Street and again into Queens Parade.
- from Bourke Street, along Nicholson Street.

== Education ==
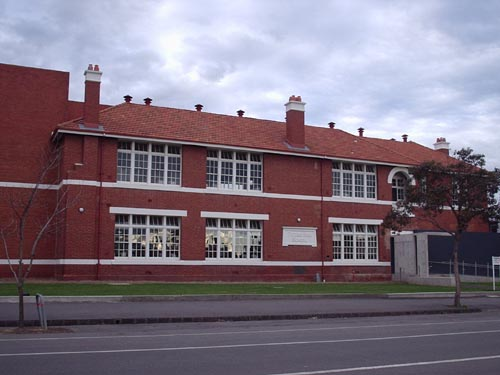
Fitzroy High School

The suburb contains five schools – Fitzroy High School, Merri Creek Primary, Fitzroy Community School, Deutsche Schule Melbourne, an independent co-educational English-German bilingual school and Fitzroy North Primary School. Fitzroy North Primary School has received state media attention for its canteen's healthy menu. It also has a LOTE program for Italian language, which is undertaken by all students and hosts large Italian-related events, such as Carnevale.

== See also ==
- City of Brunswick – Parts of Fitzroy North were previously within this former local government area.
- City of Fitzroy – Parts of Fitzroy North were previously within this former local government area.
