= Burwood, Victoria =

Suburb of Melbourne, Victoria, Australia

Burwood
- Suburb
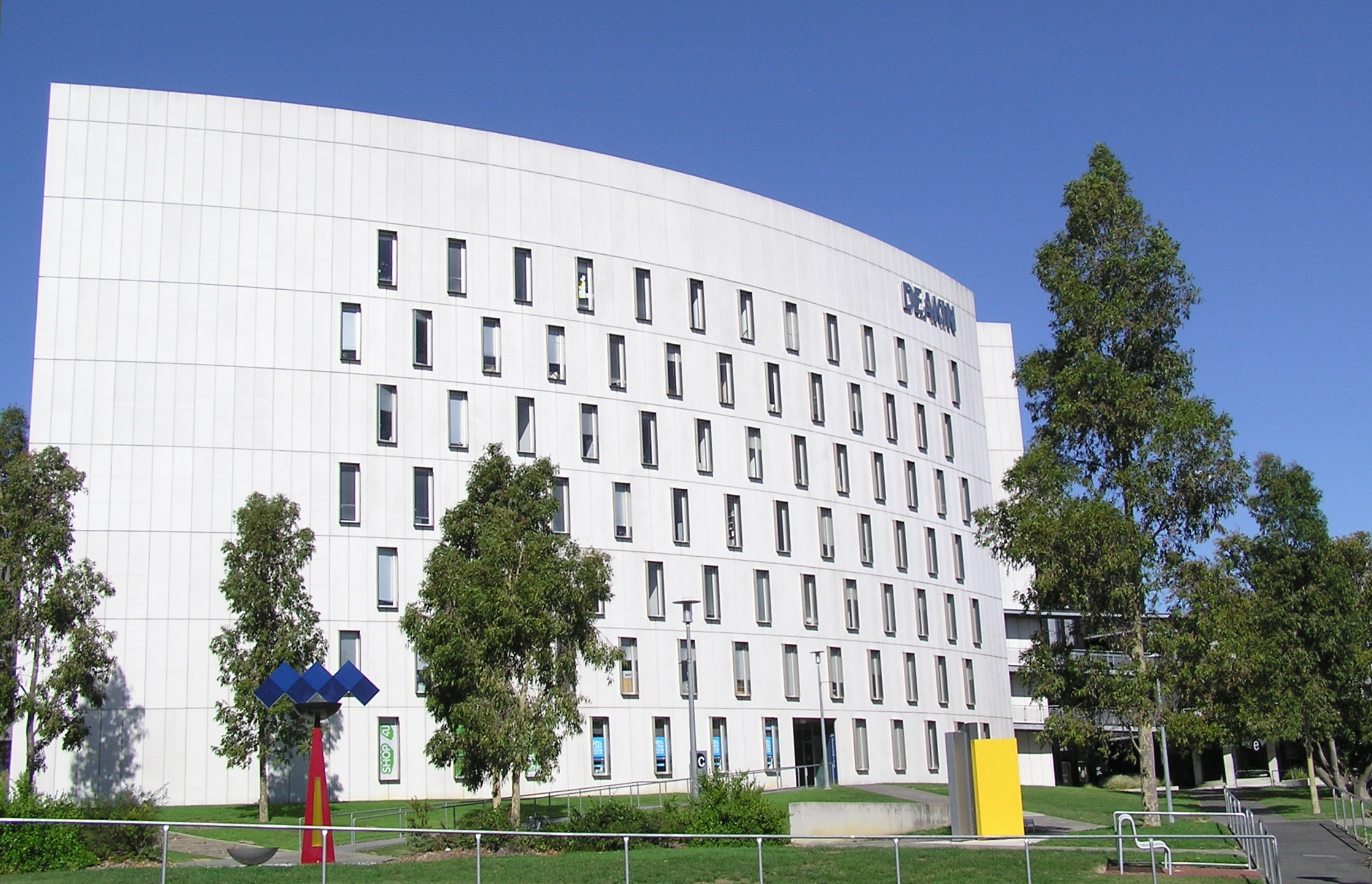
- Deakin University in Burwood

- Interactive map of Burwood
- Coordinates: 37.850°S 145.114°E
- Country: Australia
- State: Victoria
- City: Melbourne
- LGAs: City of Monash; City of Whitehorse
- Location: 14 km (8.7 mi) from Melbourne

Government
  - State electorates: Ashwood; Box Hill
  - Federal division: Chisholm

Area
  - Total: 8.7 km^{2} (3.4 sq mi)
- Elevation: 65 m (213 ft)

Population
  - Total: 15,147 (SAL 2021)
- Postcode: 3125
Suburbs around Burwood
Canterbury	Surrey Hills	Box Hill South
Camberwell	Burwood	Burwood East
Glen Iris	Ashwood	Mount Waverley

Burwood is an inner eastern suburb of Melbourne, Victoria, Australia, 14 kilometres east of Melbourne's Central Business District, located within the Cities of Monash and Whitehorse local government areas. Burwood recorded a population of 15,147 at the 2021 census.

== History ==
The first settlement in the area, known as Ballyshanassy, was surveyed in 1858. The settlement changed name to Norwood and subsequently Burwood in 1879. The Post Office opened on 1 May 1853 as Ballyshanassy and was renamed Burwood around June 1879.

The name "Burwood" (later "Invergowrie") was the name of a house built by Sir James Palmer, in Hawthorn West, in 1852. The original settlement was centred near Burwood Cemetery and the Police Station, but the focus shifted to the intersection of Warrigal Road and Toorak Road, with later commercial development. The suburb later spread westwards to the Hartwell railway station, which was renamed as Burwood railway station.

By 1904, Burwood had a population of 600 and had a post office, two hotels, a savings bank and a number of churches. The township at that time was surrounded by farms and market gardens. Albers' Daffodil Farm is typical of the local market gardens and was established in 1934. It operated on the site where Deakin University's Burwood Campus is now located, until the site was sold to the government in 1951.

The extension of the Toorak Road tramline in 1912 was a catalyst for residential development in the area. Following World War II, development headed east along Burwood Highway to and beyond the neighbourhood of Bennettswood, where a post office has been open since 2 February 1954.

=== Allambie ===
The Allambie Reception Centre for juvenile wards of the state was located at Burwood.

=== Burwood Boys Home ===
Burwood Boys' Home, originally located at 155 Warrigal Road, was founded in 1895 by Robert Campbell Edwards, who was concerned about the number of children living on the streets of Melbourne. The facility changed its name to Burwood Children's Home when girls began to be admitted after 1972. It was closed in 1986. The location is now used for Cameron Close retirement village.

=== Orana Methodist Children's Home ===
In the 1950s, 1960s and 1970s the Methodist Church developed residential units (cottages) on the site of 87 Elgar Road, Burwood, for the care of abandoned and neglected children, children that were deemed wards of the state of Victoria. This site was sold and relocated to Meadow Heights in 1989.

=== Princess Elizabeth Kindergarten for the Deaf ===
The Princess Elizabeth Kindergarten for the Deaf, the first facility of its kind in Australia, was opened on a site at 90 Elgar Road in 1950. It was later known as the Princess Elizabeth Junior School for Deaf Children.

=== Vision Australia ===
The Royal Victorian Institute of the Blind (now Vision Australia) purchased 41 acres (170,000 m^{2}) of land on Burwood Highway in 1951 for a school, which was opened in 1959. This school was closed down in December 2009. The site was also used by St. Andrews Christian College from 1998 to 2010. It has now been replaced Greenwood business park and a large housing development.

=== Drive-in theatre ===
The Burwood Skyline, opened in February 1954, was Australia's first drive-in theatre. Operated by Hoyts, it had a 652 car capacity, later increasing to 743. The drive-in was located near the intersection of Burwood Highway and McComas Grove, in a natural amphitheatre setting, provided by the Gardiners Creek Valley. The screen was located on a high point on the other side of the creek from the viewing area. The first film publicly screened was On the Riviera, starring Danny Kaye and Gene Tierney. The drive in was very popular in its early years, often causing traffic jams in the local area. A playground was provided for children, which included a motorised carousel.

Following a decline in audience numbers over a number of years, the drive-in closed on 22 June 1983, with a screening of We of the Never Never and Local Hero.

=== Heritage listings ===
The following places in Burwood are listed on the Victorian Heritage Register:

- Burwood Primary School (former), at 172 Burwood Road
- Wattle Park, a 41-hectare (100-acre) urban park

== Population ==
Historical population
Year	Pop.	±%
2006	11,886	—
2011	13,162	+10.7%
2016	15,019	+14.1%

In the 2016 Census, there were 15,019 people in Burwood. 46.9% of people were born in Australia. The next most common countries of birth were China 17.5%, India 4.1%, Malaysia 3.1%, Sri Lanka 2.9% and England 1.9%. 49.3% of people spoke only English at home. Other languages spoken at home included Mandarin 18.1%, Cantonese 4.5%, Greek 3.3%, Sinhalese 2.2% and Vietnamese 1.7%. The most common responses for religion were No Religion 37.9% and Catholic 17.9%.

== Geography ==
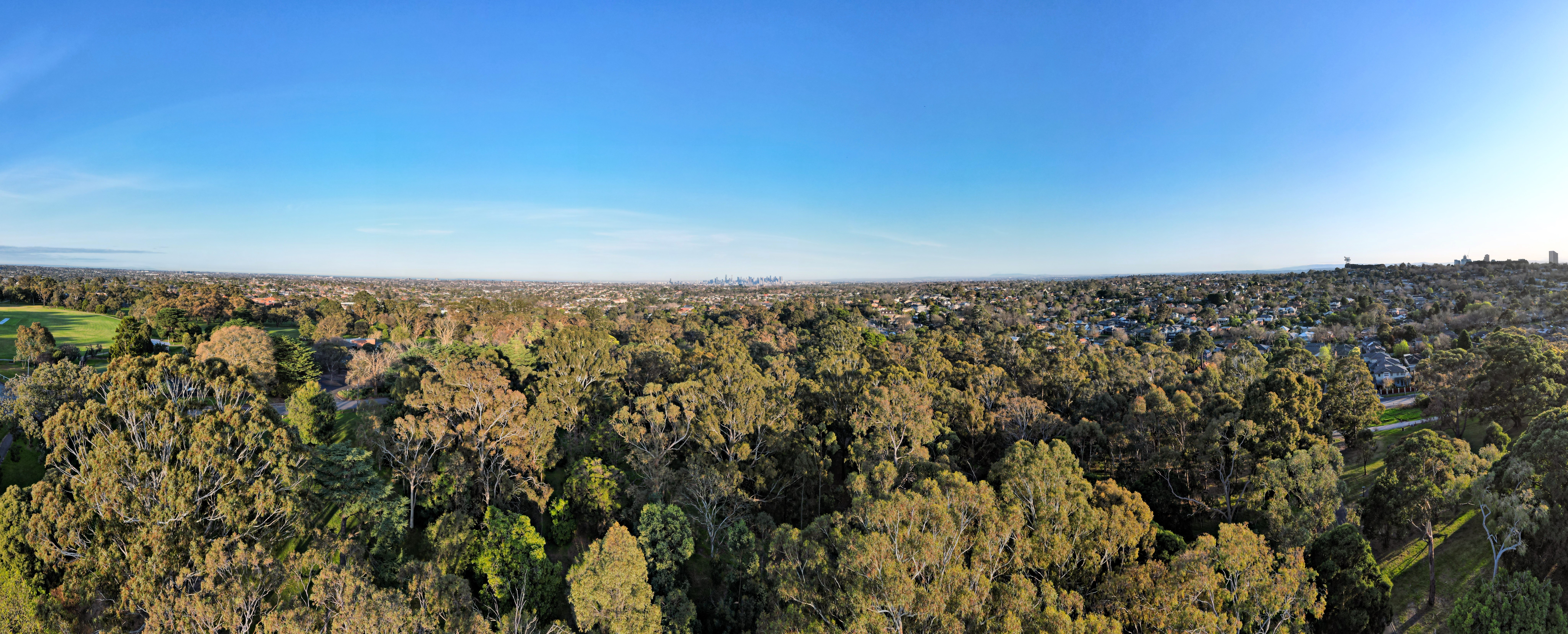
Aerial panorama of Wattle Park facing Melbourne's skyline. August 2023.

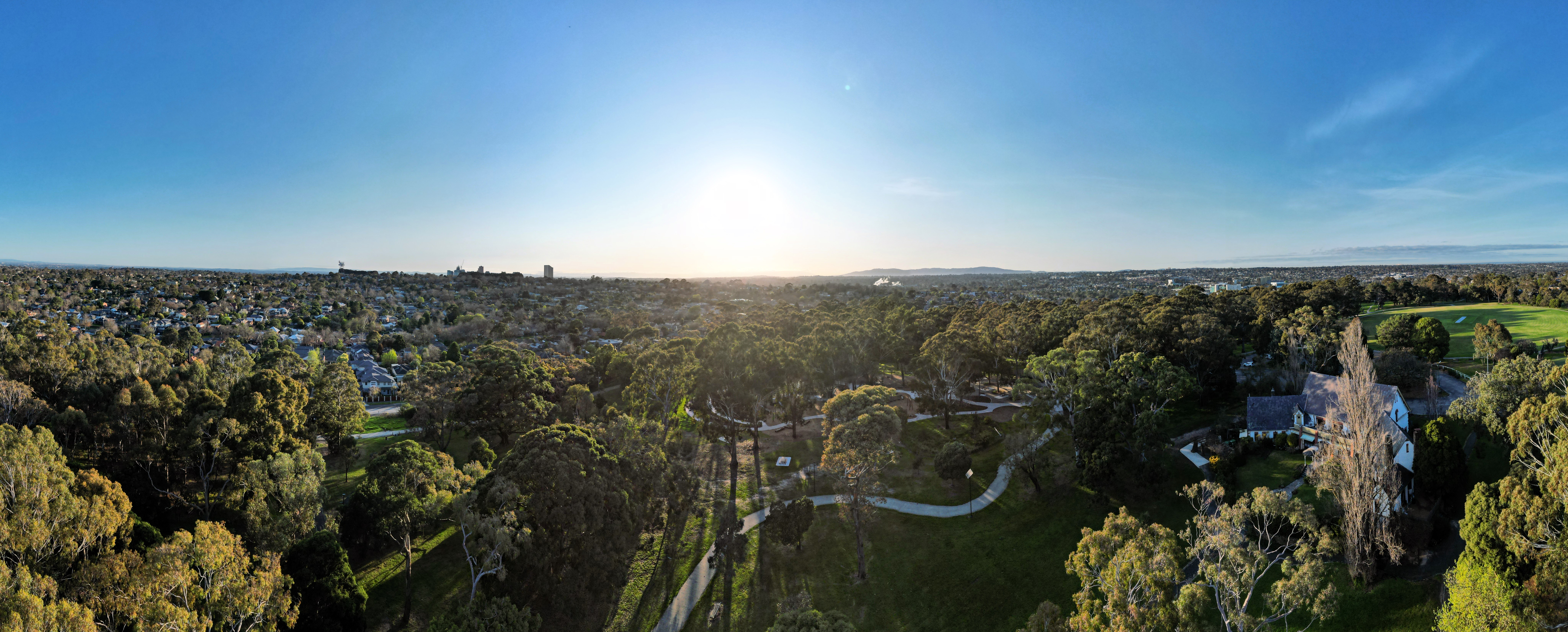
Aerial panorama of sunrise over Wattle Park facing the Dandenong Ranges. August 2023.

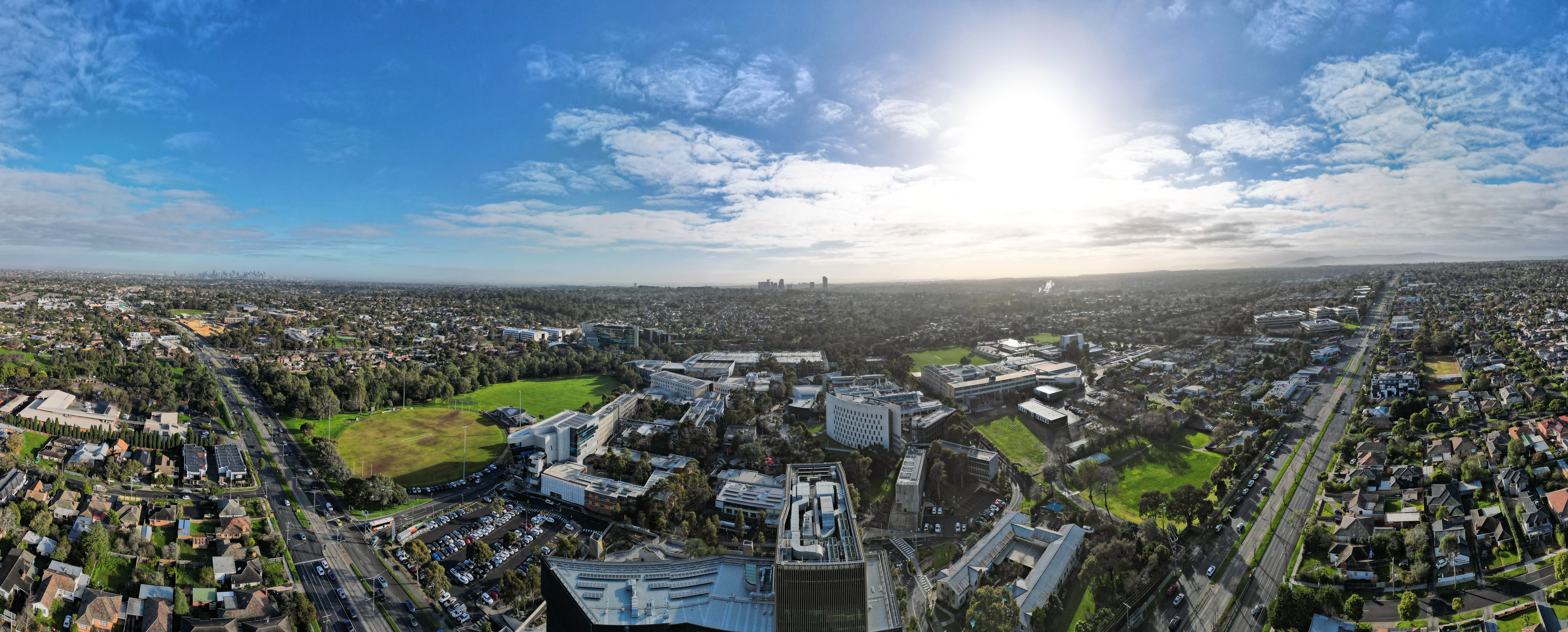
Aerial panorama of Deakin University facing north. July 2023.

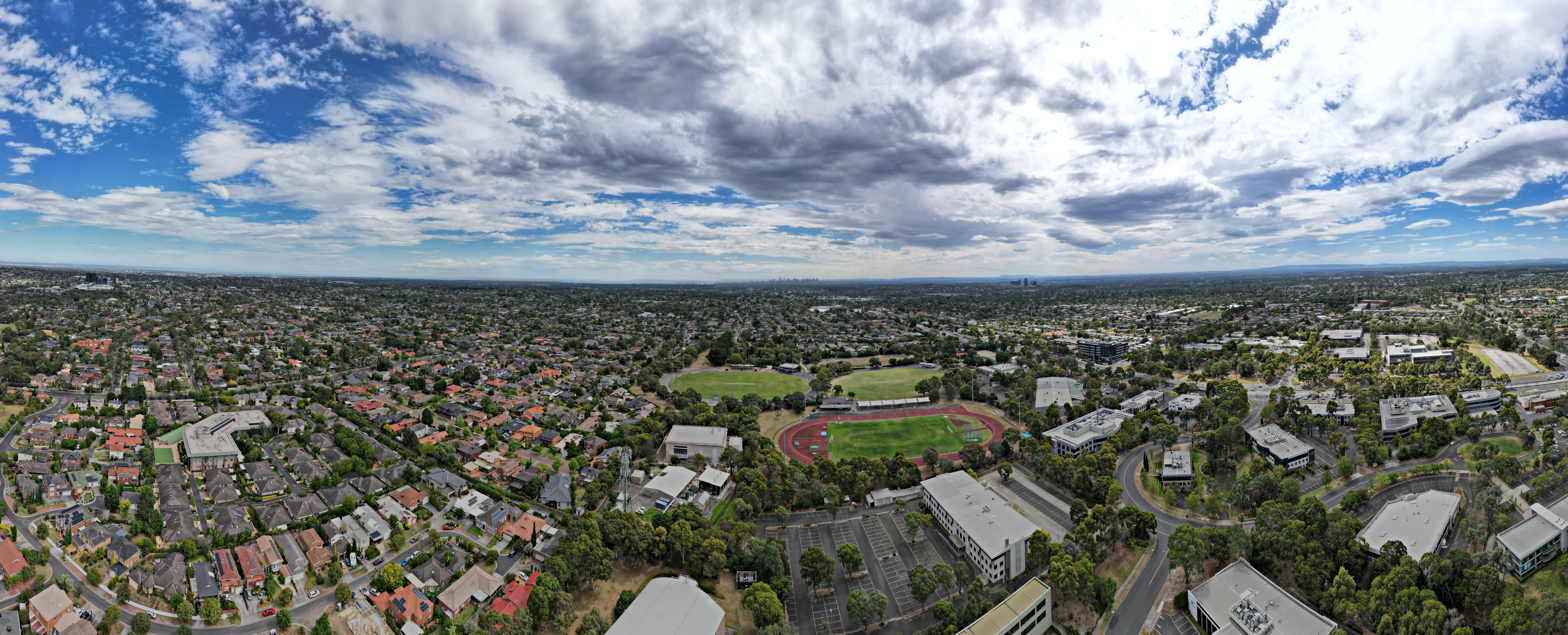
Aerial panorama of Burwood East reserve facing the city skyline

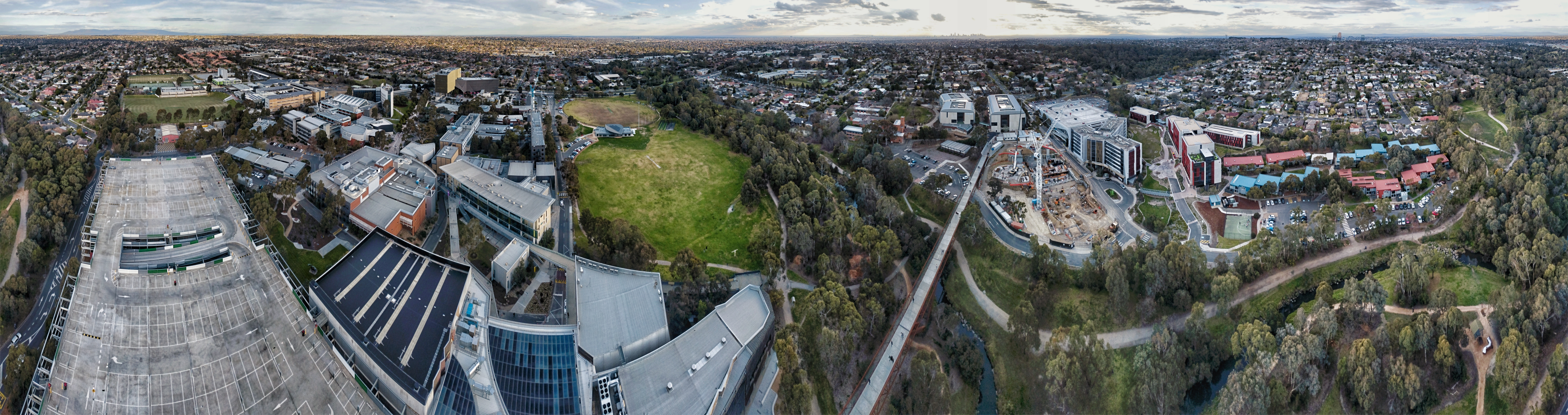
Aerial panorama of Deakin University Burwood Campus in September 2018. (Altitude: 110m)

Burwood is bounded to the north by Riversdale Road, the northern boundary of Deakin University, Gardiners Creek and Eley Road, the east by Middleborough Road and to the west by Warrigal Road. The southern boundary runs near to Carlyle and Zodiac Streets, then along Gardiners Creek and subsequently, in approximate alignment with Ashwood Drive, Montpellier Road, Arthur Street, Huntingdale Road and Highbury Road.

The most prominent features of the Burwood landscape are the large buildings constructed along Burwood Highway at Deakin University, include Building C (The Alfred Deakin Building). A new multistoried modern building has also been constructed just adjacent to the Burwood Highway. This is building BC.

== Shopping centres ==
The main Burwood shopping centre is located at the intersection of Warrigal Road and Burwood Highway. Another shopping strip is located at Bennettswood, to the east, on the corner of Burwood Highway and Station Street.

== Education ==
=== University ===
- Deakin University – Burwood Campus

=== Secondary schools ===
- Emmaus College – Year 9 Campus
- Mount Scopus Memorial College – Gandel Campus
- Presbyterian Ladies' College

=== Primary schools ===
- St Benedict's primary school
- Wattle Park Primary School
- Burwood East Primary School
- St Scholastica's Primary School

== Sports and recreation ==
Parks in the suburb include Wattle Park and Gardiners Creek Reserve, the latter which has a shared bicycle and pedestrian path. Sports facilities include Bennettswood Sports Ground and Bennettswood Bowling Club. Burwood Reserve and Burwood Bowling Club are located in nearby Glen Iris.

Golfers play at the course of the Wattle Park Public Golf Club, on Riversdale Road.

The suburb is home to an Australian rules football team, the Emmaus Animals, who compete in the Saturday Football League. Their home ground is at Bennettswood Reserve, adjacent to Deakin University.

The Eastern Lions Soccer Club compete in the National Premier Leagues of Victoria first division and are located at Gardiners Reserve.

== Transport ==
The principal north–south roads are Warrigal Road, Elgar Road, Station Street and Middleborough Road, while the principal east–west roads are Riversdale Road, Burwood Highway and Highbury Road.

Two tram routes serve the suburb;

- Route 70 – Waterfront City Docklands to Wattle Park; travels along Riversdale Road, the northern boundary of the suburb, before terminating at the intersection with Elgar Road
- Route 75 – Etihad Stadium Docklands to Vermont South; travels along Burwood Highway through the whole suburb

There is no train service in the suburb, with Burwood railway station located in the adjoining suburb of Glen Iris.

There are a number of bus routes, which connect the suburb to surrounding areas.

== Retirement villages ==
Burwood has two retirement villages; Fountain Court, on Station Street and Cameron Close, on Warrigal Road. There are also aged care facilities, including Elizabeth Gardens, in Elizabeth Street, Highwood House, in Warrigal Road and Burwood Hill, in Edwards Street.

== Notable people ==
- Nazeem Hussain, Comedian, Actor, Television and Radio Presenter
- Flea, from the Red Hot Chili Peppers, was born and lived in the suburb, until he was 5 years old.

== See also ==
- City of Box Hill – Parts of Burwood were previously within this former local government area.
- City of Camberwell – Parts of Burwood were previously within this former local government area.
- City of Waverley – Parts of Burwood were previously within this former local government area.
