= B class Melbourne tram =

1984 Melbourne tram class

B class
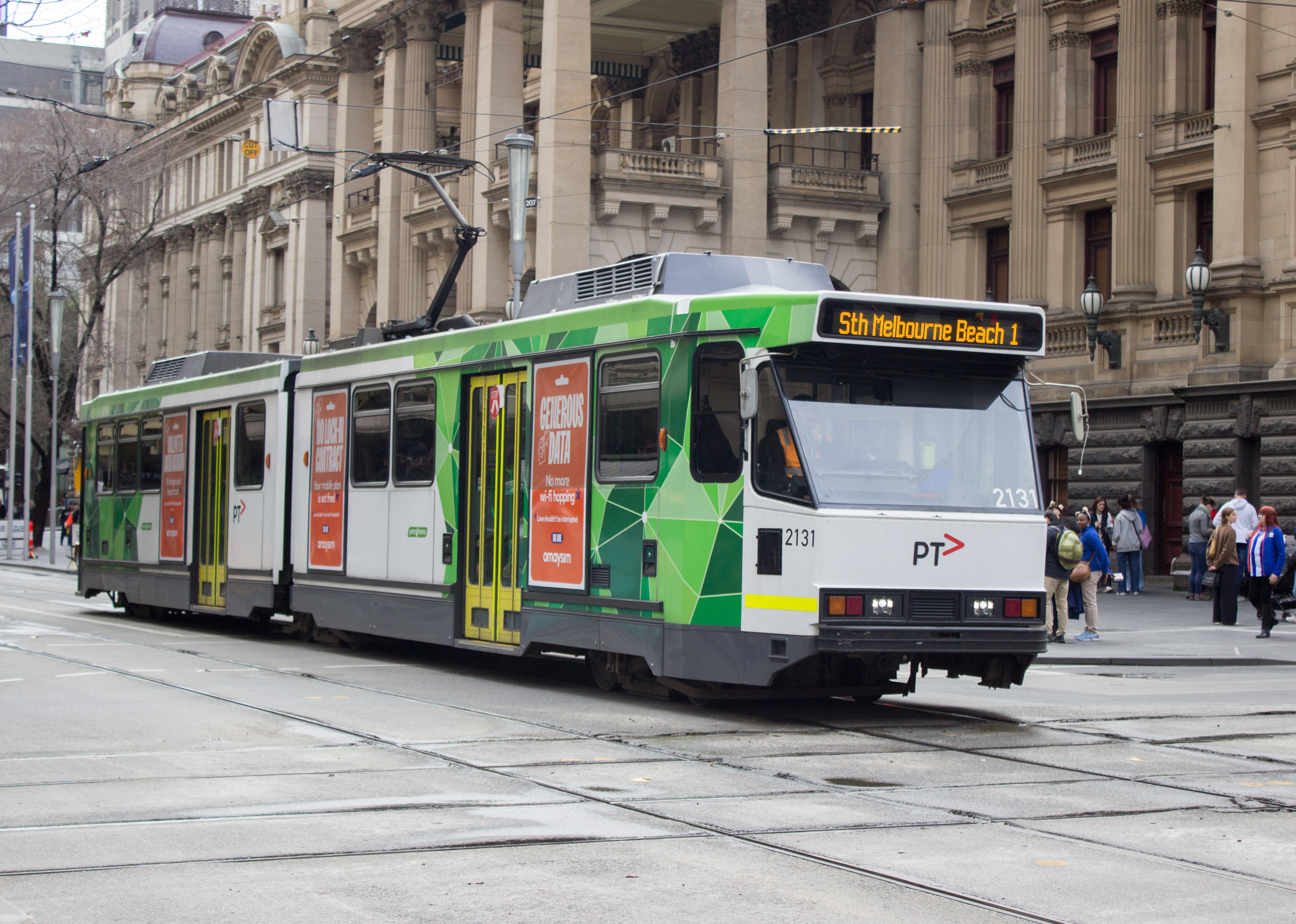
- B2.2131 crosses the Swanston Street and Collins Street intersection, August 2022

- Refurbished B2 class interior
- Manufacturer: Comeng/ABB
- Assembly: Dandenong
- Replaced: All remaining W2 and SW2 class trams, all W5 and many SW5 trams, and many W6, SW6 and W7 trams
- Constructed: 1984–1994
- Number built: 132
- Number in service: 130 (January 2023)
- Fleet numbers: B1 2001–B1 2002; B2 2003–B2 2132
- Capacity: B1/B2: 76/110; B2 (Apollo): 40/120; (seated/standing)
- Depots: Brunswick; Camberwell; Essendon; Glenhuntly

Specifications
- Train length: B1: 23.53 m (77 ft 2 in); B2: 23.63 m (77 ft 6 in)
- Width: 2.67 m (8 ft 9 in)
- Height: B1: 3.35 m (11 ft 0 in); B2: 3.65 m (12 ft 0 in)
- Doors: 6
- Articulated sections: 1 (two sections)
- Wheel diameter: 660 mm (26 in)
- Wheelbase: 1.8 m (5 ft 11 in)
- Weight: B1: 32.5 t (32.0 long tons; 35.8 short tons); B2: 34.0 t (33.5 long tons; 37.5 short tons)
- Traction system: B1: AEG/Siemens chopper control; B2: AEG/Siemens GTO chopper control
- Traction motors: 2 × AEG ABS 3322 195 kW (261 hp)
- Power output: 390 kW (523 hp)
- Acceleration: 1.35 m/s^{2} (3.02 mph/s)
- Deceleration: 1.55 m/s^{2} (3.47 mph/s) (Dynamic braking); 1.4 m/s^{2} (3.13 mph/s) (Mechanical braking); 3 m/s^{2} (6.71 mph/s) (Emergency)
- Electric systems: 600 V DC (nominal) from overhead catenary
- Current collection: Pantograph
- UIC classification: B′(2)′B′
- Bogies: Duewag tandem-drive
- Track gauge: 1,435 mm (4 ft 8 1/2 in) standard gauge

The B class Melbourne tram is a class of two-section, three-bogie articulated class trams that operate on the Melbourne tram network. Following the introduction of two B1 class prototype trams in 1984 and 1985, a total of 130 B2 class trams were originally built by Comeng, and later ABB, at Dandenong factory.

They were developed for the conversion of the St Kilda and Port Melbourne railway lines to light rail, and introduced by the Metropolitan Transit Authority, and later the Public Transport Corporation between 1984 and 1994.

== History ==
In preparation of the conversion of the St Kilda and Port Melbourne railway lines to light rail, two prototype B1 class trams were built in 1984 and 1985 at the end of an order for A1 class trams. They were followed by 130 B2 class trams built between 1987 and 1994. All were built by Comeng and later ABB in Dandenong. They were the first articulated trams on the Melbourne tram network, and the B2 class were the first air-conditioned trams.

On the request of the Victorian Transport Minister, who wished the last of the B2 class order to be low-floor trams, an articulated low-floor design was developed by Comeng from 1989. The tram was to ostensibly utilise the components from the B class and be partially low-floor, with internal stairs over the bogies. The design progressed quite far, with concept art, design schematics, and a mock up produced, and work on the first body shell commenced. The project was cancelled in 1990, with the new transport minister opting to finish the full B2 class order instead of the low-floor variant; this was on the back of disputes between Comeng and the Public Transport Corporation, a cabinet reshuffle, and ABB's acquisition of Comeng. The prospect of low-floor access was raised again in the late 1990s when the Public Transport Corporation considered adding a low-floor section to the B class trams, between the two sections. However, at a cost of $700,000 per tram it was not considered cost effective, and not carried out.

When the Melbourne tram network was privatised in August 1999, 55 B2 class passed to M>Tram, while the two 'B1 class' and other 75 B2 class went to Yarra Trams. All became part of the Yarra Trams fleet in April 2004 when the network was reunited.

In 2007, the dot-matrix displays on the B1 class trams were replaced with LED equipment, and cab air-conditioning was fitted in 2009. In 2014, an upgrade of the interiors commenced. Seats were removed and replaced with 'lean seats' as fitted on the C and C2 class trams, increasing capacity by seven to nine passengers while providing space for prams and shopping carts, while extra hand rails were also installed floor to ceiling, along with seats being re-covered. These changes were aimed at increasing capacity while providing better use of space and flow through the vehicles. Step-well lighting was also improved, providing better visibility by changing to LED lighting. The program aimed to add capacity of approximately 1,100 passengers to the B class fleet and was completed in early 2014.

In June 2015, the installation of an automated onboard passenger information system, similar to that used on the E class fleet, commenced at Camberwell depot. This program also changed over the entire B class fleet destination displays from the previously fluorescent-lit dot-matrix to the more visible, bright orange LED type seen on the Z3 class.

== Subclasses ==
=== B1 class ===
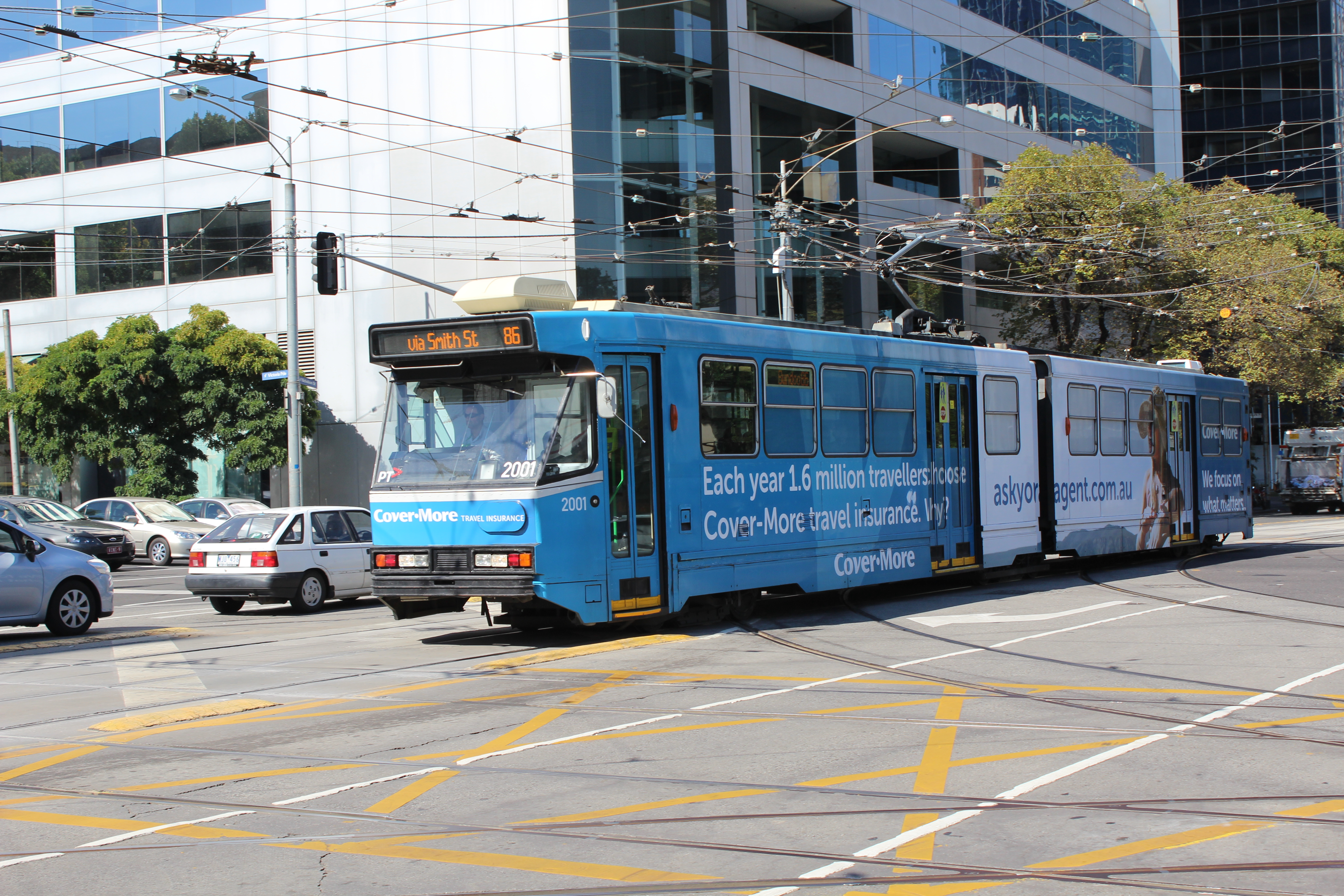
B1 2001 on route 86 on Nicholson Street in advertising livery, April 2013

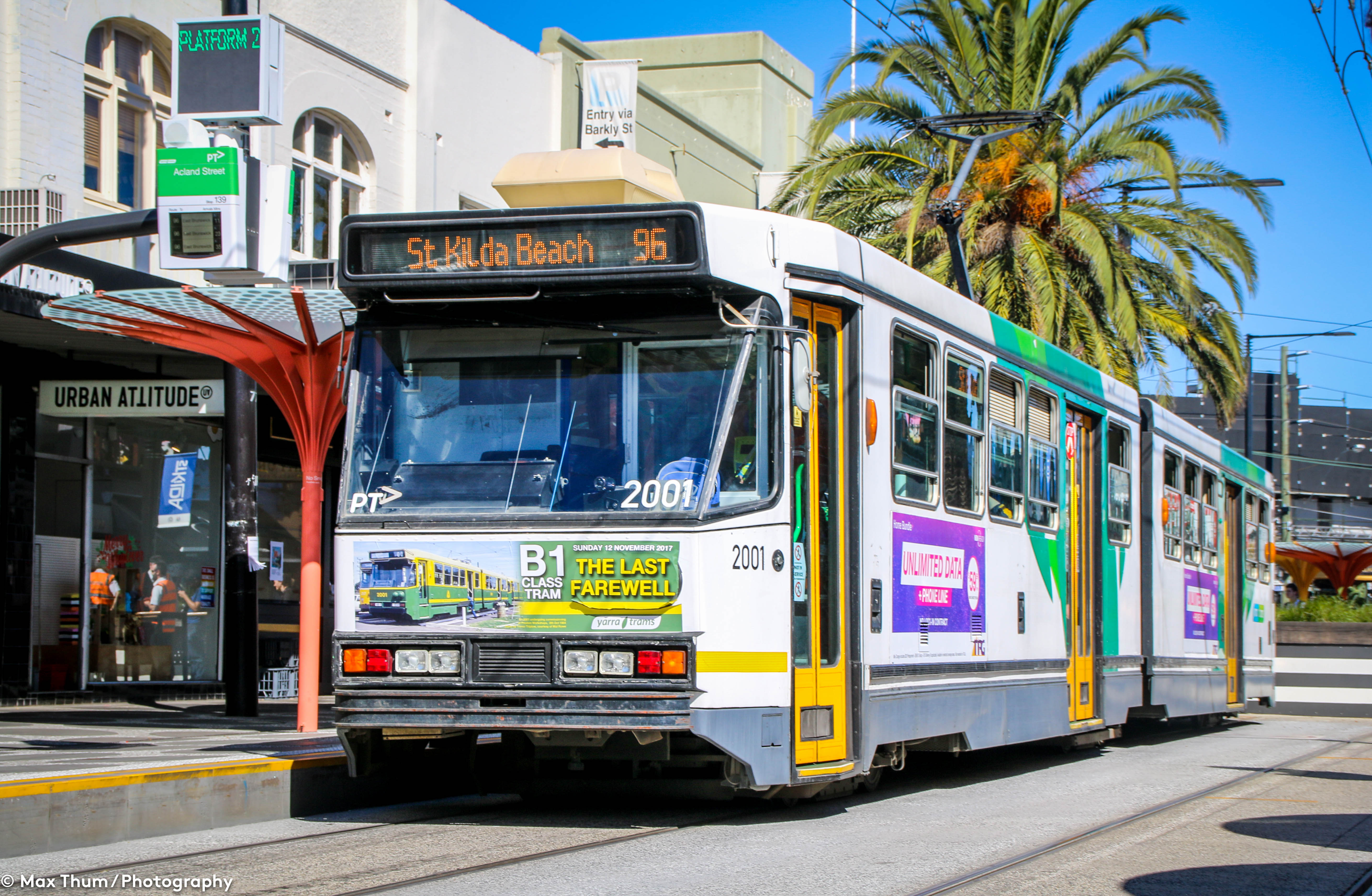
B1 2001 at Acland Street (B1 Final Farewell Tour), November 2017

The B1 class comprises two trams built as prototype light rail vehicles built by Comeng in 1984 and 1985 for the St Kilda and Port Melbourne light rail conversion projects. Both B1s were fitted with air compressors and air brakes (the only other trams currently in service also fitted with air brakes are the W class), and were originally fitted with both trolley poles and pantographs. They were originally built with dual-height steps to allow for level boarding at railway platforms and street level, but both have had these features removed, with low floor stops build adjacent to the railway platforms instead. They have a very similar interior to the B2 class, except they have no air-conditioning, and are fitted with opening windows and different sun shades.

B1 2001 was delivered to the Metropolitan Transit Authority on 7 February 1984 and entered service on 19 December 1984, while B1 2002 entered service on 17 December 1985. Both initially operated out of Camberwell depot on routes 70 and 75, before B1 2001 was transferred to South Melbourne and B1 2002 to North Fitzroy in 1987 when the St Kilda and Port Melbourne lines opened. Both had compressor issues in the early to mid 2000s, but were later rectified, both being based at East Preston depot by this stage.

In 2016, both B1 class trams were meant to have been withdrawn after an organised farewell tour was hosted by Yarra Trams on 2 February 2016. However, as of August 2016, B1 2001 remained in service while B1 2002 was in storage.

As of November 2017, both B1 Class trams were in long-term storage at Preston Workshops after its final run around Melbourne on the 12 November 2017. B1 2001 remained in operational state representing the B1 Class trams, but B1 2002 was taken apart for parts for B1 2001.

In February 2018, both B1 Class trams were withdrawn from Yarra Trams services. In November 2023, B1 2001 was transferred from Preston Workshops by road to a scrapping facility.

=== B2 class ===
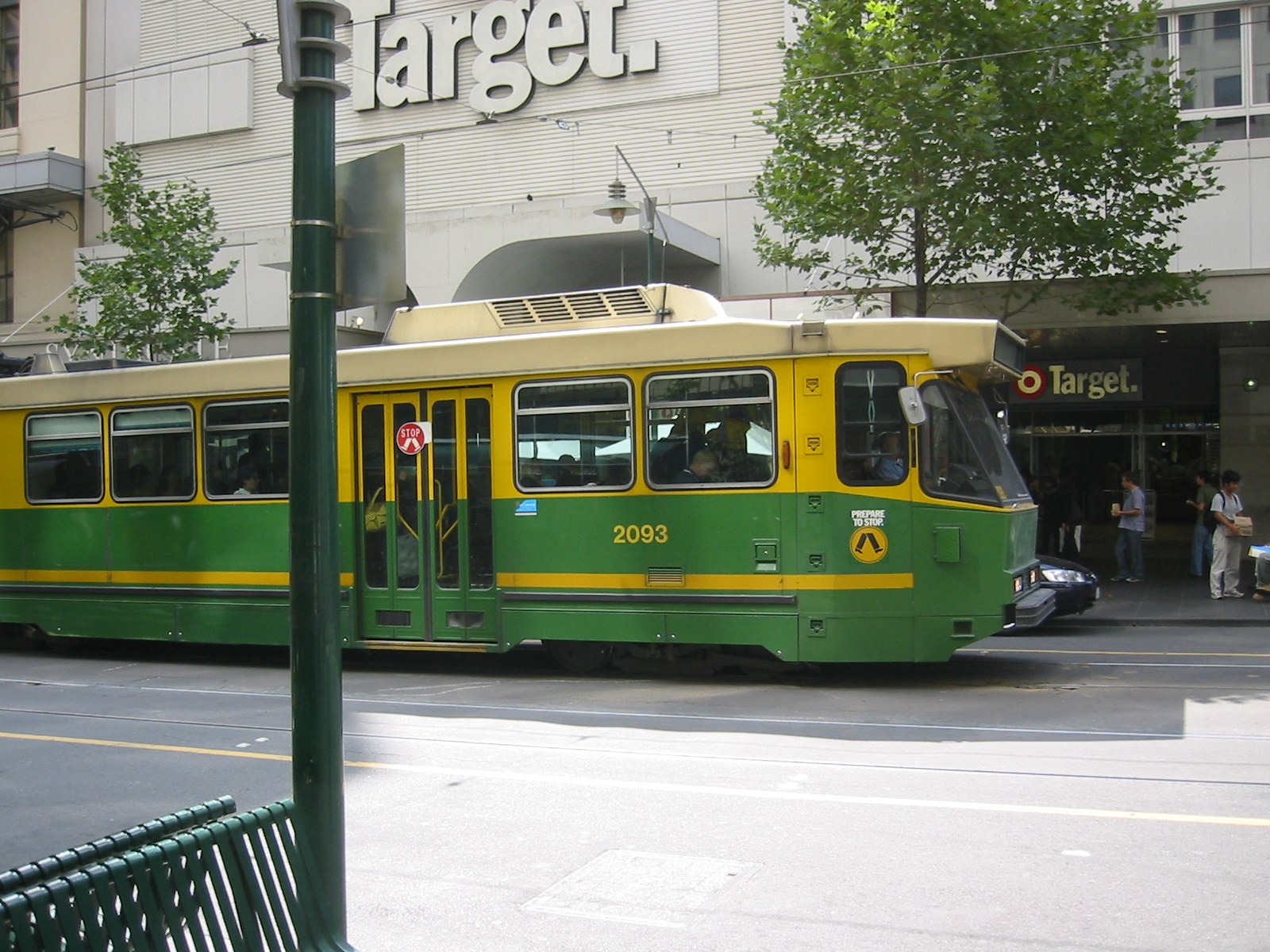
B2 2093 in Metropolitan Transit Authority livery on Bourke Street, February 2003

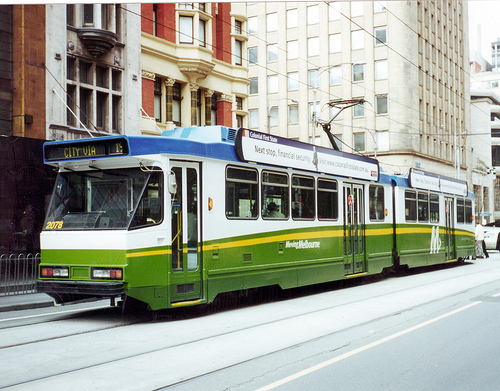
B2 2078 in M>Tram livery on route 19 on Elizabeth Street, August 2001

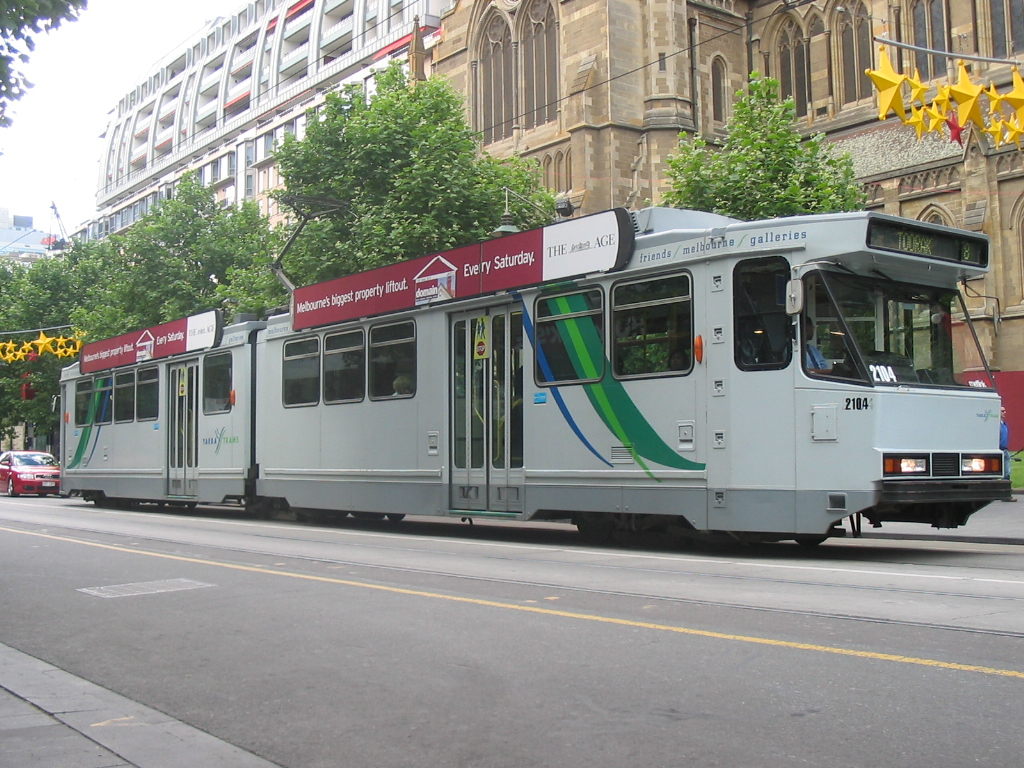
B2 2104 in TransdevTSL livery on route 8 on Swanston Street, November 2005

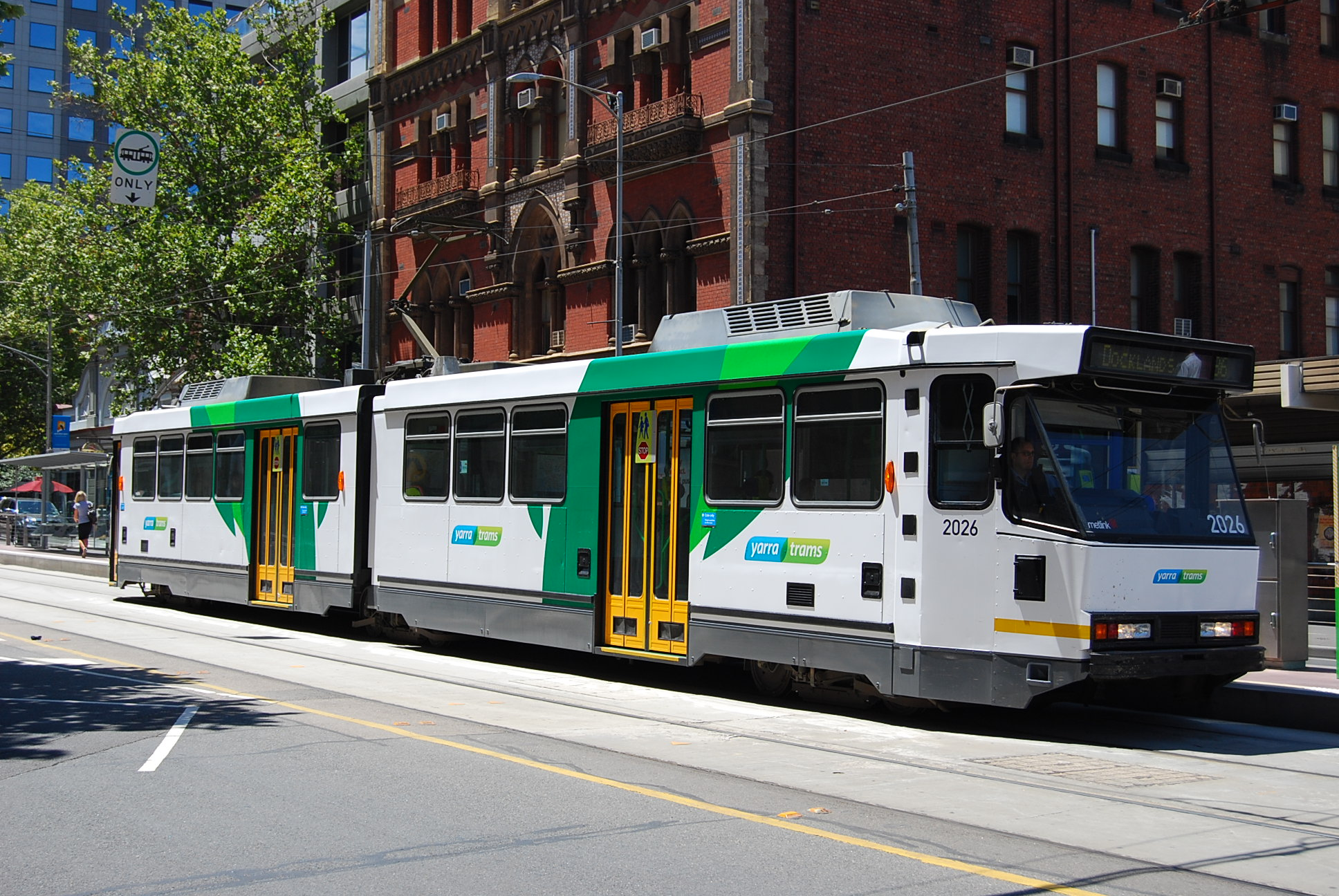
B2 2026 on route 86, January 2010

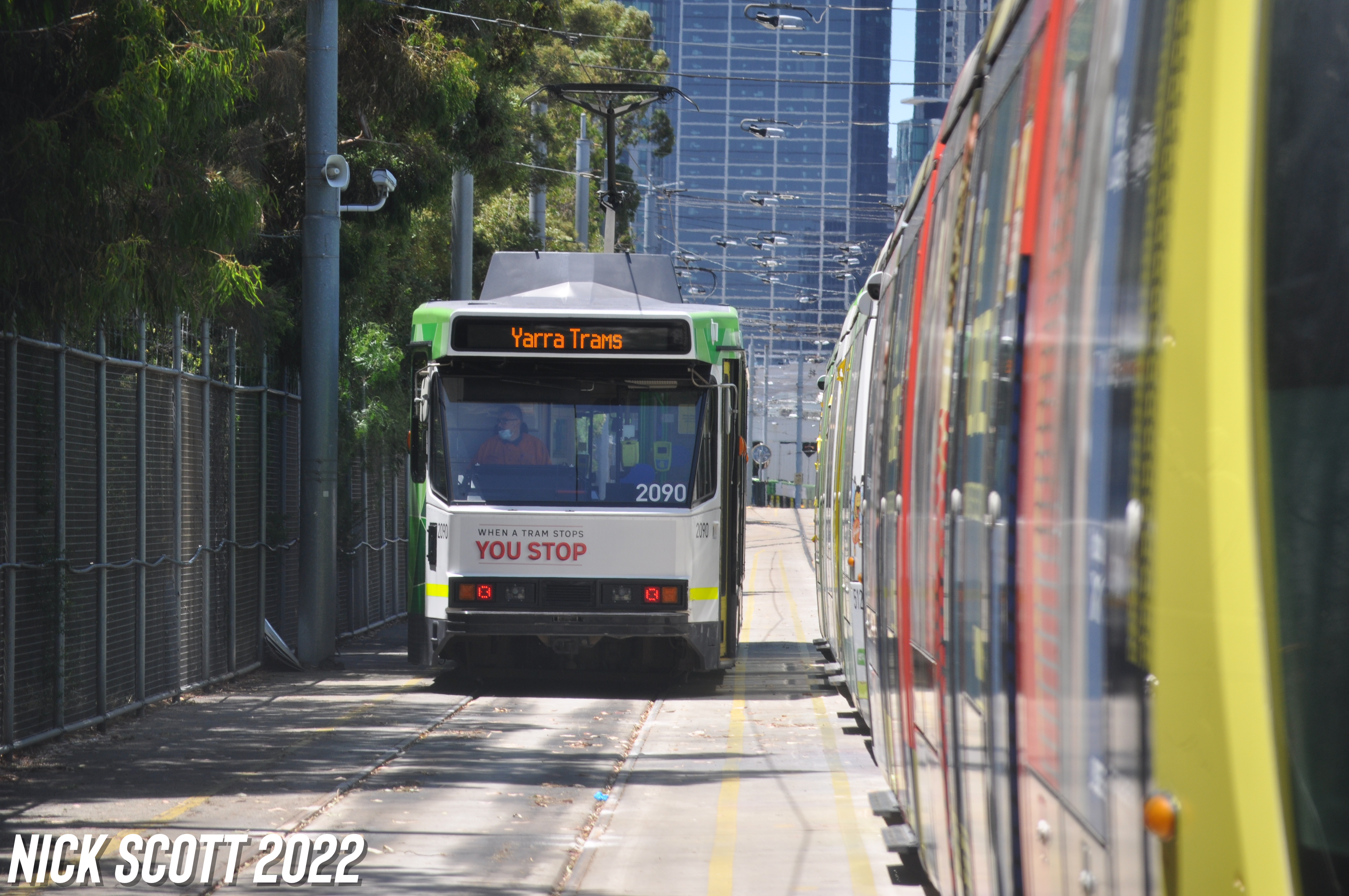
B2 2090 at Southbank tram depot, January 2022

Following the B1 class trams, an order of 130 B2 class trams was completed by Comeng (later ABB) between 1987 and 1994, originally for the St Kilda and Port Melbourne light rail conversions, they quickly spread across the system. Although quite similar to the B1 class, they differed in several ways, they were the first Melbourne trams to feature air conditioning, include dot-matrix destination signs, and although the electronics of the B2 class were similar to earlier Z3 and A class trams, they were fitted with GTO control systems.

It was intended that they be used to replace trains on the Upfield railway line but this did not eventuate. In September 1992, the 100th articulated tram for Melbourne, B2 2102 was delivered in 'chocolate and cream' livery, approximating the M&MTB colours of the 1920s; it was also re-numbered as 2100.

In February 1992, 2089 was taken to Canberra and displayed in the city as part of a promotion for a planned light rail scheme. In November 2001, 2057 and 2059 collided on the corner of Nicholson Street and Victoria Parade. The undamaged portions were married together as 2059 while the two damaged portions were rebuilt at Preston Workshops and returned to service as 2057.

In 2003, Yarra Trams refitted ten B2 class trams with the "Apollo" seating layout, in which some seats were replaced with "bum racks" (similar to those seen in the C class trams), in an effort to increase passenger capacity. All B2 class trams remain in service and are painted in either the Yarra Trams livery, or have all-over advertising applied.

== Operation ==
B class trams operate on the following routes:

- 1: East Coburg to South Melbourne Beach
- 3: East Malvern to Melbourne University
- 19: North Coburg to Flinders Street Station
- 58: West Coburg to Toorak
- 59: Airport West to Flinders Street Station
- 64: East Brighton to Melbourne University
- 67: Carnegie to Melbourne University
- 70: Wattle Park to Waterfront City Docklands
- 75: Vermont South to Central Pier Docklands

B class trams formerly operated on the following routes:

- 6: Glen Iris to Moreland
- 11: Victoria Harbour Docklands to West Preston
- 86: Waterfront City Docklands to Bundoora RMIT
- 96: St Kilda Beach to East Brunswick

B class trams operated on the following routes prior to their abolition:

- 8: Toorak to Moreland
- 55: Domain Interchange to West Coburg
- 95: Melbourne Museum to City
- 112: West Preston to St Kilda
