= Camberwell tram depot =

Tram depot in metropolitan Melbourne, Victoria, Australia

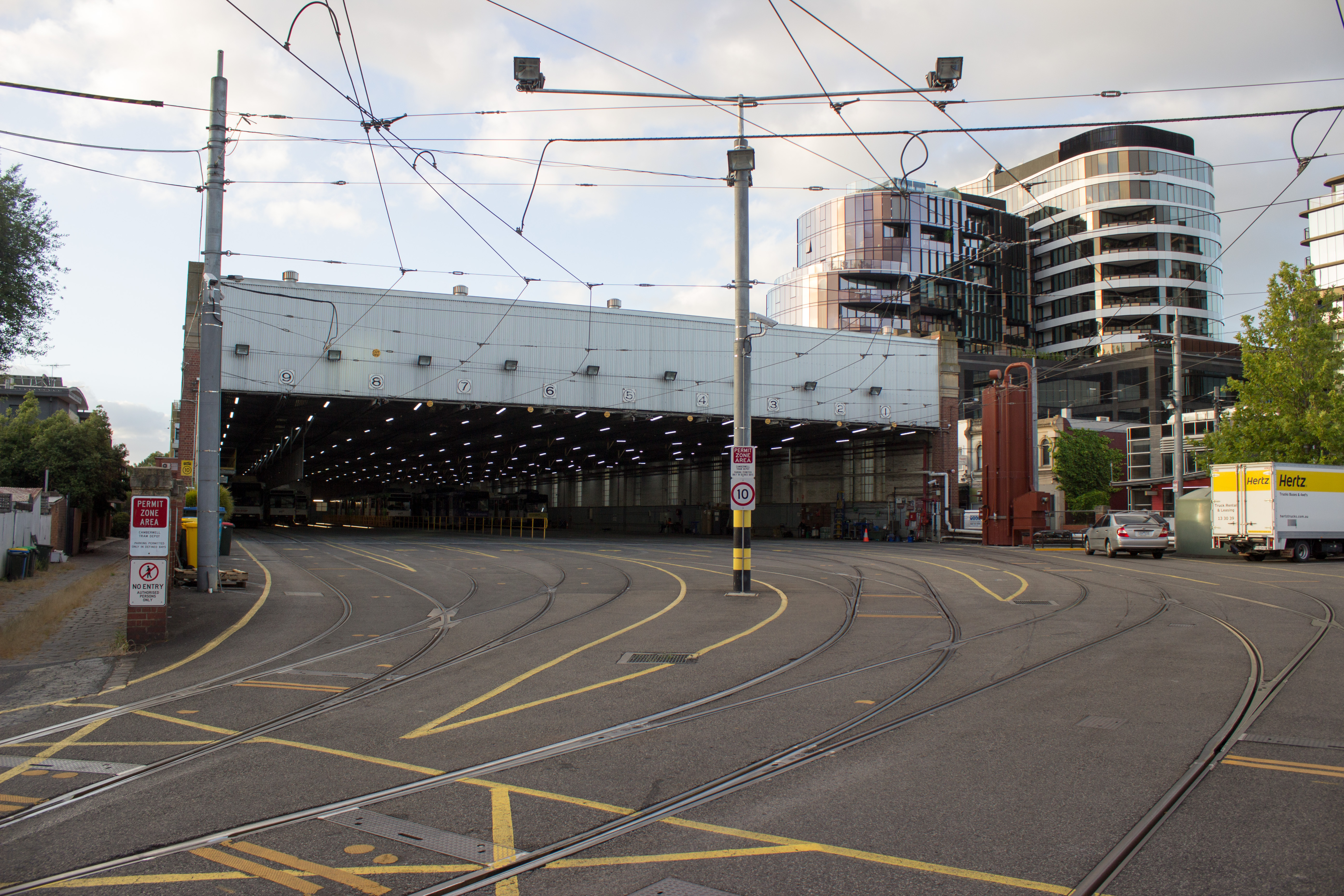
- Camberwell tram depot shed, 2022

- Location within Melbourne
- Interactive map of Camberwell tram depot

Location
- Location: Council Street, Hawthorn East, Melbourne, Victoria, Australia
- Coordinates: 37°49′49″S 145°03′17″E

Characteristics
- Owner: VicTrack
- Operator: Yarra Trams
- Depot code: V
- Type: Tram
- Roads: 9 (all in sheds)
- Rolling stock: 4 A1-class; 18 A2-class 38 B2-class

History
- Opened: December 1929; 96 years ago

The Camberwell tram depot is a tram depot located on Council Street, Hawthorn East, a inner-east suburb of Melbourne, Victoria, Australia. Opened in December 1929, it is operated by Yarra Trams. It is one of eight tram depots on the Melbourne tram network.

== History ==
The electric tram line from Batman Avenue in the city to Warrigal Road (then Boundary Road) along Riversdale Road opened in 1917, built by the Hawthorn Tramways Trust. The Melbourne & Metropolitan Tramways Board took over the line in 1920, and in 1928, extended the line a further two kilometres to Wattle Park. With the increase in suburban development and tram use, in July 1928, the Board approved the acquisition of a number of properties on Camberwell Road, west of Camberwell Junction, in preparation for the construction of a new tram depot.

A tender for £31,990 to construct the depot was accepted on 1 November 1928 by the MMTB, with the depot opening in December 1929. It was designed by the Board's chief architect, Alan G Monsborough in a restrained Inter-war Georgian Revival style. The opening of Camberwell depot ushered in a multitude of operational changes in the eastern part of the tram network, including extended hours of tramway operation. The routes using the depot eventually became primarily the Route 70 and 75.

Traffic lights were installed on Riversdale Road, at the entrance to Camberwell depot in 1948, to increase safety. The traffic lights were in response to a large number of near misses, and were activated by trams.

When the Public Transport Corporation was privatised in August 1999, Camberwell depot passed to Yarra Trams.

== Layout ==
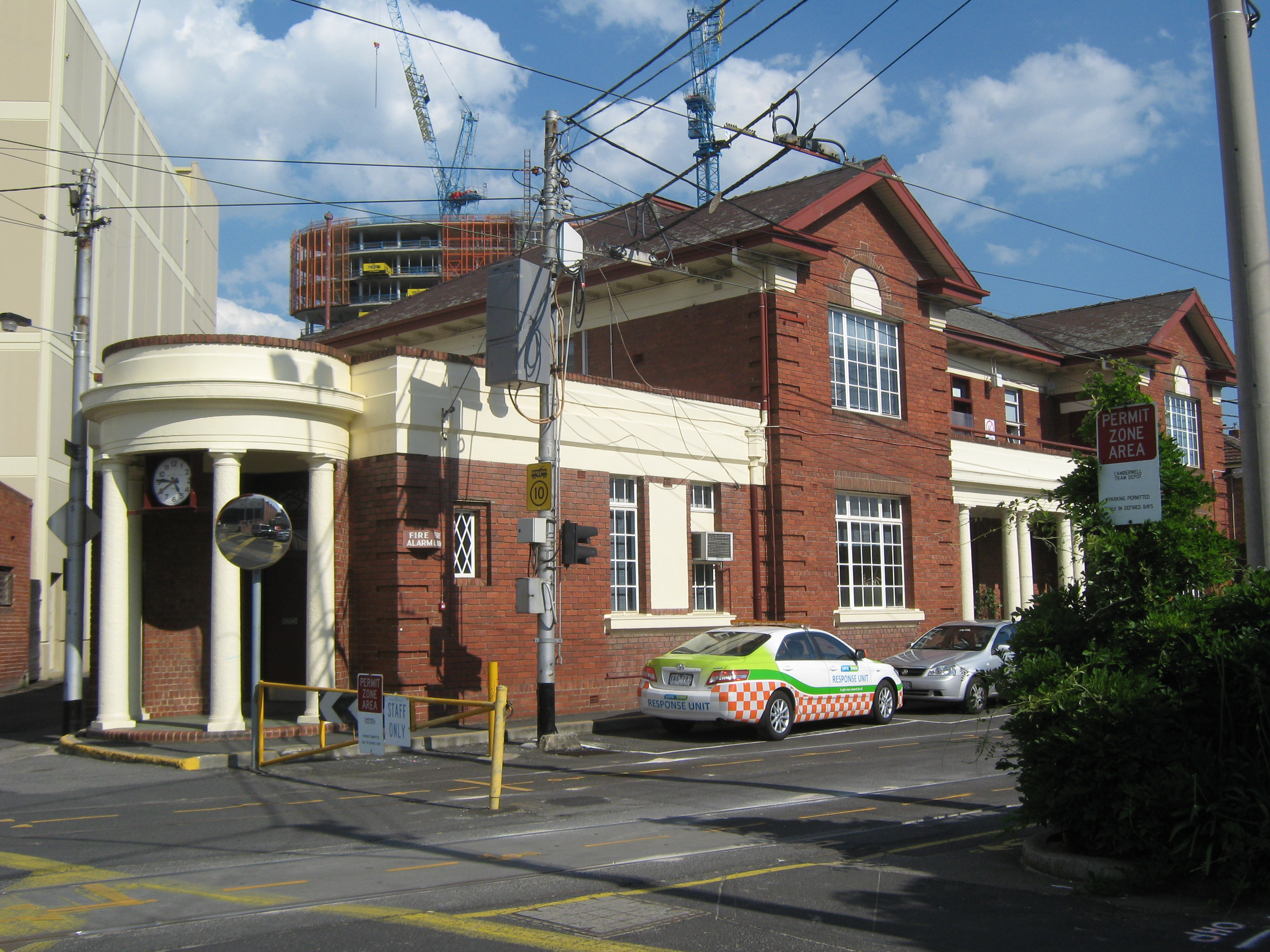
Depot offices and staff rooms, 2011

Camberwell tram depot has nine roads, all of which are covered by a single 115 foot single span roof. This is said to increase safety within the depot shed as there are no columns, while also providing better lighting. The depot shed is connected to Riversdale Road by a double track entrance. The staff facilities and offices are in an adjacent building.

== Rolling stock ==
As of May 2024, the depot had an allocation of 60 trams: 4 A1-class, 18 A2-class and 38 B2-class.

== Routes ==
The following routes are operated from Camberwell depot:

- : Waterfront City Docklands to Wattle Park
- : Central Pier Docklands to Vermont South

== See also ==
- Timeline of trams in Melbourne
