= Burwood Primary School =

Former primary school in Melbourne, Victoria, Australia

Burwood Primary School (former)

Location
- 172 Burwood Road, Burwood, Melbourne, Victoria; Australia
- 37°51′00″S 145°06′23″E

Information
- Former names: Wesleyan Day School; Ballyshanassy Common School; Burwood State School
- Type: Private primary school (1856–1864); Government primary school (1864–1990)
- Established: 15 November 1856
- Closed: 1 January 1990

History
- Built: 1865
- Built for: Wesleyan Church
- Original use: Primary school

Site notes
- Material: Brick
- Architectural style: Victorian Carpenter Gothic
- Owner: Department of Education

Victorian Heritage Register
- Official name: Primary School No.461- Former Burwood School
- Type: Registered place
- Designated: 20 August 1982
- Reference no.: H0975
- Heritage overlay no.: HO1
- Category: Educaiton

The Burwood Primary School is a former primary school, located at 172 Burwood Road, Burwood, an inner eastern suburb of Melbourne, in Victoria, Australia. Repurposed, the building has formed part of an independently-operated child care centre since 2023.

The former school and hall were added to the Victorian Heritage Register on 20 August 1982.

== History ==
The school opened on 15 November 1856 (Note: The Victorian Heritage Register states that the school was established in 1865. However, this is most likely the year the building was completed, not the start date.) as a private primary school, called the Wesleyan Day School. It was located at Damper Creek, Nunawading. The first head teacher was Mr Barraclough, and the first paid head teacher was Richard Hurry. In 1857, the school received funds for Hurry's wife, Ann, to help with teaching. The school was renamed as the Ballyshanassy Common School (No. 461) in 1864.

The current school building on Burwood Road, no longer used as a school, was completed in 1865. The head teacher was Walter Brookes who remained as head teacher for 23 years, assisted by his wife and later his daughters. As the local Burwood population grew, the nearby Nunawading State School (No. 464) closed. Miss Demsey, one of Nunawading's teachers, transferred to Ballyshanassy and the school received leftover property from the Nunawading school. In 1879, the name of the school chawed to Burwood State School (No. 461). By 1883, the school added a brick extension to house a new infant school for forty children; and was extended again in 1906.

Between 1928 and 1931, further improvements were made to the school; and, in 1932, the school's Mothers' Club presented a bell that remained at the school into the 1970s.

A large schoolroom, a staffroom and an office for the head teacher were remodelled, and built in 1934. A new classroom for grades 7 and 8 was also built. In 1950, a new infant school was added and by 1952, adjacent land was purchased, including the Protestant Hall, and a new oval was completed. Additional classrooms were added in 1954 and again in 1959, when a library was also opened.

In 1960, a school census recorded up to 580 students at the school. By 1963, for the first time since the 1890s, the headmaster no longer lived at the school; and a new arts and crafts room was built. In the late 1860s, teacher students from the Burwood Teachers College underwent training at the school. As more schools opened in the local area, enrolments deceased and, in 1970, the school's named changed to Burwood Primary School. The school closed with effect from the last day of term in 1989.

== Description ==
The original brick single room school at Burwood was built in 1865 on Crown land granted to the Wesleyans in 1855. The classroom was extended in 1883, 1906 and 1935.

The former Burwood Primary School, with the unusual stylistic detail in its early Victorian Carpenter Gothic-paired windows, gable ends and bargeboards, is an extraordinary example of a single room school established between 1962 and 1872, under the Common Schools Board of Education. The 1883 and 1906 extensions to the original brick classroom demonstrate a changing sequence of architectural styles, patterns of occupancy and function affecting school buildings and education in Victoria. The stepped floor in the 1906 classroom, designed to achieve better sight lines for pupils in 'object classes', is a rare and important example of past teaching practice and classroom design which, by 1901, was being replaced by flat floors with platforms for teachers.

== See also ==
- List of government schools in Victoria, Australia
