= Melbourne tram route 75 =

Tram route in metropolitan Melbourne, Victoria, Australia

Route 75

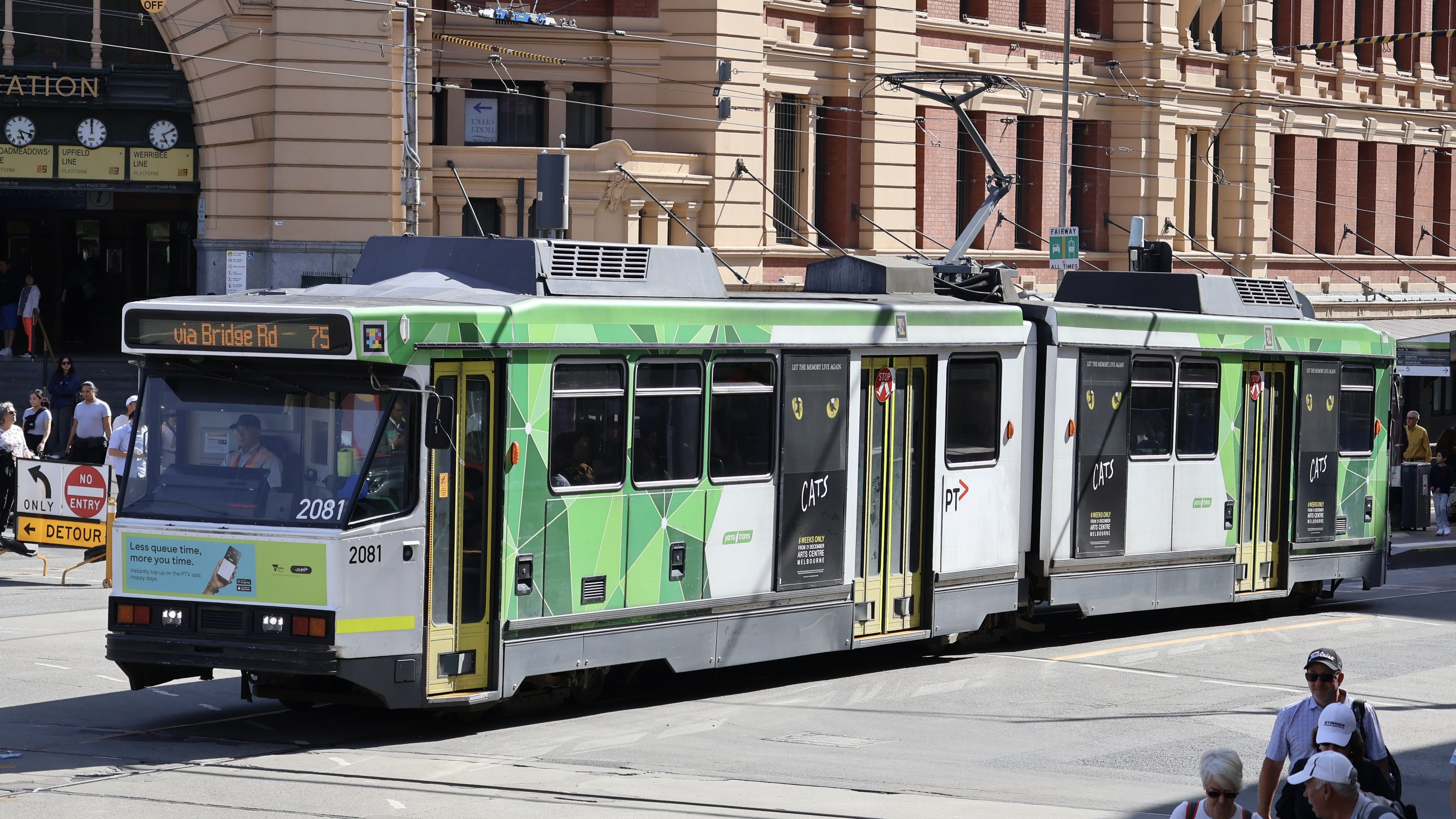
- B class tram at Flinders Street railway station, December 2025

Overview
- System: Melbourne
- Operator: Yarra Trams
- Depot: Camberwell
- Vehicle: A class B class
- Night-time: Friday & Saturday

Route
- Start: Vermont South
- Via: Burwood Highway; Camberwell Road; Riversdale Road; Bridge Road; Flinders Street; Harbour Esplanade
- End: Central Pier
- Length: 24.1 kilometres (Note: This length includes a 600 metre extension beyond the last passenger stop to the Docklands terminus. Nevertheless, even at 23.5 kilometres, it remains the longest route on the network.)
- Zones: Free Zone: Stops D2-D6, 1-8; Myki Zone 1: Stops 9-40; Zone 1/2 overlap: Stops 41-75
- Timetable: Route 75 timetable
- Map: Route 75 map

Melbourne tram route 75 is a tram route on the Melbourne tramway network serving the city of Melbourne in Victoria, Australia. Operated by Yarra Trams, the route is coloured light blue and extends from Vermont South to Central Pier over 24.1 kilometres of double track via Burwood Highway, Camberwell Road, Riversdale Road, Bridge Road, Flinders Street and Harbour Esplanade. It is serviced out of Camberwell depot utilising A and B class trams. It is the longest route on the network.

== History ==
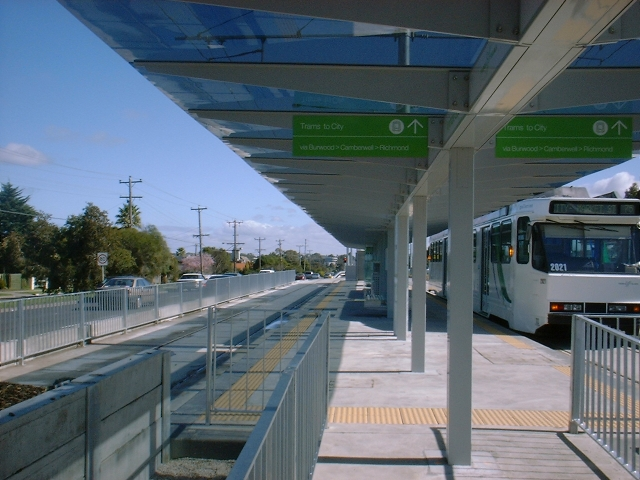
B class tram at Vermont South, August 2005

The origins of route 75 lie in separate tram lines, Australia's first cable tram from Bourke Street to Hawthorn Bridge and a horse tram from Hawthorn Bridge to Auburn Road, which was converted to an electric line and extended over many years to its current terminus at Vermont South.

The first cable tram line opened by the Melbourne Tramway and Omnibus Company was from Bourke Street to Hawthorn Bridge along Spencer Street, Flinders Street, Wellington Parade and Bridge Road opened on 11 November 1885. On 27 January 1889 a horse tram from Hawthorn Bridge to Auburn Road, travelling via Burwood Road, Power Street and Riversdale Road was opened. The Hawthorn Tramways Trust (HTT) closed the horse tramway for conversion to electric traction on 31 January 1916, with the electric line opening in two stages; Power Street to Auburn Road along Riversdale Road opening on 7 May 1916, and from Hawthorn Bridge to Riversdale Road along Burwood Road and Power Street on 21 June 1916.

The Riversdale Road line was extended by the HTT on 31 May 1916 to Bowen Street in Camberwell, along Riversdale Road and Camberwell Road and passing through Camberwell Junction. It was extended a week later on 10 June 1916 to Boundary Road (now Warrigal Road) in Burwood, along Camberwell Road and Norwood Road (now Toorak Road). The Melbourne & Metropolitan Tramways Board (MMTB) converted the Bourke Street to Hawthorn Bridge cable line to electric traction in three stages, closing the line on 29 June 1927. Reopening with electric trams running from Lonsdale Street, a short electric extension to the previous cable terminus of Bourke Street, to Swanston Street on 14 July 1927, from Swanston Street to Simpson Street on 17 September 1927, and Simpson Street to Hawthorn Bridge on 4 December 1927.

Throughout 1934, Hawthorn and Camberwell depot services were allocated route numbers. Route 74 was allocated the service between the Batman Avenue tram terminus in the City (route 70's long-time terminus until 1999) and the Burwood terminus via Swan Street on 9 December, while route 27 was allocated the service between Spencer Street and Hawthorn tram depot via Bridge Road on 6 June. Route 75 was a short-working service of route 74 between the Batman Avenue terminus and Smith Road at Hartwell. Route 27's terminus in the City was extended slightly north to terminate at La Trobe Street, when the MMTB opened the La Trobe Street line on 15 January 1951. Initially, services on weekday daytime and Saturday mornings were also extended to Brunswick Street but the through-routing ceased just a month later on 26 February, due to congestion on Flinders Street hampering on-time running of the Hawthorn service.

In February 1965, Hawthorn tram depot closed, and routes 74 and 75 were re-routed via Bridge Road towards the Spencer Street terminus, replacing route 27. Operation of the routes along Bridge Road was also passed to Camberwell tram depot. From 1 August 1977, Z-class trams were attached to Camberwell depot and commenced operating route 74 in readiness for an East Burwood extension. The MMTB viewed the new trams as desirable for the proposed line addition. On 12 July 1978, the terminus of the Burwood line and route 74 were slightly shifted east to Somers Street. Just a week later, on 19 July 1978, the Burwood line was extended a further 3.4 kilometres to Middleborough Road in Burwood East, and the entire line ran as route 75 while route 74 (City to Somers Street) became the short-working of route 75. The line was now exclusively operated by Z-class trams.

Beginning 16 March 1981, Z3-class trams were allocated to Camberwell depot for route 75. Entering service on 19 December 1984, B1-class 2001 was allotted to Camberwell depot and began operating route 75; it was joined at the depot with B1-class 2002 from 17 December 1985. The two B1s were reallocated on 20 November 1987 to route 96 after the St Kilda Beach "light rail" extension opened. From 19 December 1993, B2-class trams were assigned to Camberwell depot and began operating route 75. Due to a Camberwell depot Z3 shortage, A-class trams were allocated there and started operating the route from 28 March 1994. All Z-class trams assigned to Camberwell depot besides two Z3s—because of an A2-class shortage—were reallocated by January 1996 for the eventual network privatisation. The two Z3s would leave the depot by 1997, ending Z-class running on route 75.

On 8 July 1993, the line was extended to Blackburn Road. In December that year, at the Spencer Street end, the route was amended to terminate at a new siding north of La Trobe Street (along with route 48) so that terminating trams were out of the way of through trams on La Trobe and Spencer Streets. During the 1999 election campaign, the Labor State Opposition committed to extend route 75 to Knox City Shopping Centre. Labor won the election, but the line was only extended to its current terminus at Vermont South on 23 July 2005, with a connecting route 732 bus operated by Ventura Bus Lines. At 24.1 kilometres, it became the longest line on the network. The Public Transport Users Association has campaigned for the line to be extended to its originally proposed terminus.

On 4 May 2003, the route was changed at the City end to terminate at Flinders Street, west of Spencer Street, swapping route termini with route 70, and it no longer ran along Spencer Street. Between May and November 2005, the route temporarily terminated at Market Street due to the closure and demolition of the King Street Overpass in Flinders Street. After the works were completed, on 21 November 2005, the route was reinstated along Flinders Street and Spencer Street, and terminated at La Trobe Street one more. On 26 January 2014, the route was changed to terminate at Central Pier and no longer served Spencer Street.

In January 2016, route 75 began operating through the night on Fridays and Saturdays as part of the Night Network.

Melbourne tram route 75 evolution
Dates	Route	Notes
9 December 1934 – 12 February 1965	Hartwell to City (Batman Avenue)	Short-working of route 74 via Swan Street
12 February 1965 – 18 July 1978	Hartwell to City (Spencer / La Trobe Streets)	Short-working of route 74 via Bridge Road, Flinders Street and Spencer Street
19 July 1978 – 7 July 1993	Burwood East (Middleborough Road) to City (Spencer / La Trobe Streets)	via Bridge Road, Flinders Street and Spencer Street
8 July 1993 – 3 May 2003	Burwood East (Blackburn Road) to City (Spencer / La Trobe Streets)	via Bridge Road, Flinders Street and Spencer Street
4 May 2003 – 21 May 2005	Burwood East (Blackburn Road) to City (Flinders / Spencer Streets)	via Bridge Road and Flinders Street
22 May 2005 – 24 July 2005	Burwood East (Blackburn Road) to City (Flinders / Market Streets)	Temporary arrangement due to the closure and removal of the Flinders Street Overpass
25 July 2005 – 20 November 2005	Vermont South to City (Flinders / Market Streets)	Temporary arrangement due to the closure and removal of the Flinders Street Overpass
21 November 2005 – 25 January 2014	Vermont South to City (Spencer / La Trobe Streets)	via Bridge Road, Flinders Street and Spencer Street
26 January 2014 – onwards	Vermont South to Central Pier	via Bridge Road, Flinders Street and Harbour Esplanade

== Route ==
Interactive map of Melbourne tram route 75.

Route 75 runs Central Pier along Flinders Street and continues past Flinders Street station, St Paul's Cathedral, and Federation Square, entering East Melbourne east along Wellington Parade and into Richmond continuing east on Bridge Road.

At Hawthorn Bridge it crosses the Yarra River into Hawthorn and continues east on Burwood Road, it briefly travels south on Power Street before turning east into Riversdale Road, traversing Hawthorn and Hawthorn East. At Camberwell Junction it crosses Burke Road and travels south east along Camberwell Road.

It enters Toorak Road and heads east, at Warrigal Road Toorak Road becomes the Burwood Highway, it continues east, past Deakin University and through Burwood East, to its terminus in Vermont South.

== Operation ==
Route 75 is operated out of Camberwell depot with B class trams. During the Australian Open, almost all services are run with A class trams. The A class tram very occasionally runs on the route 75.

== Controversy over accessibility ==
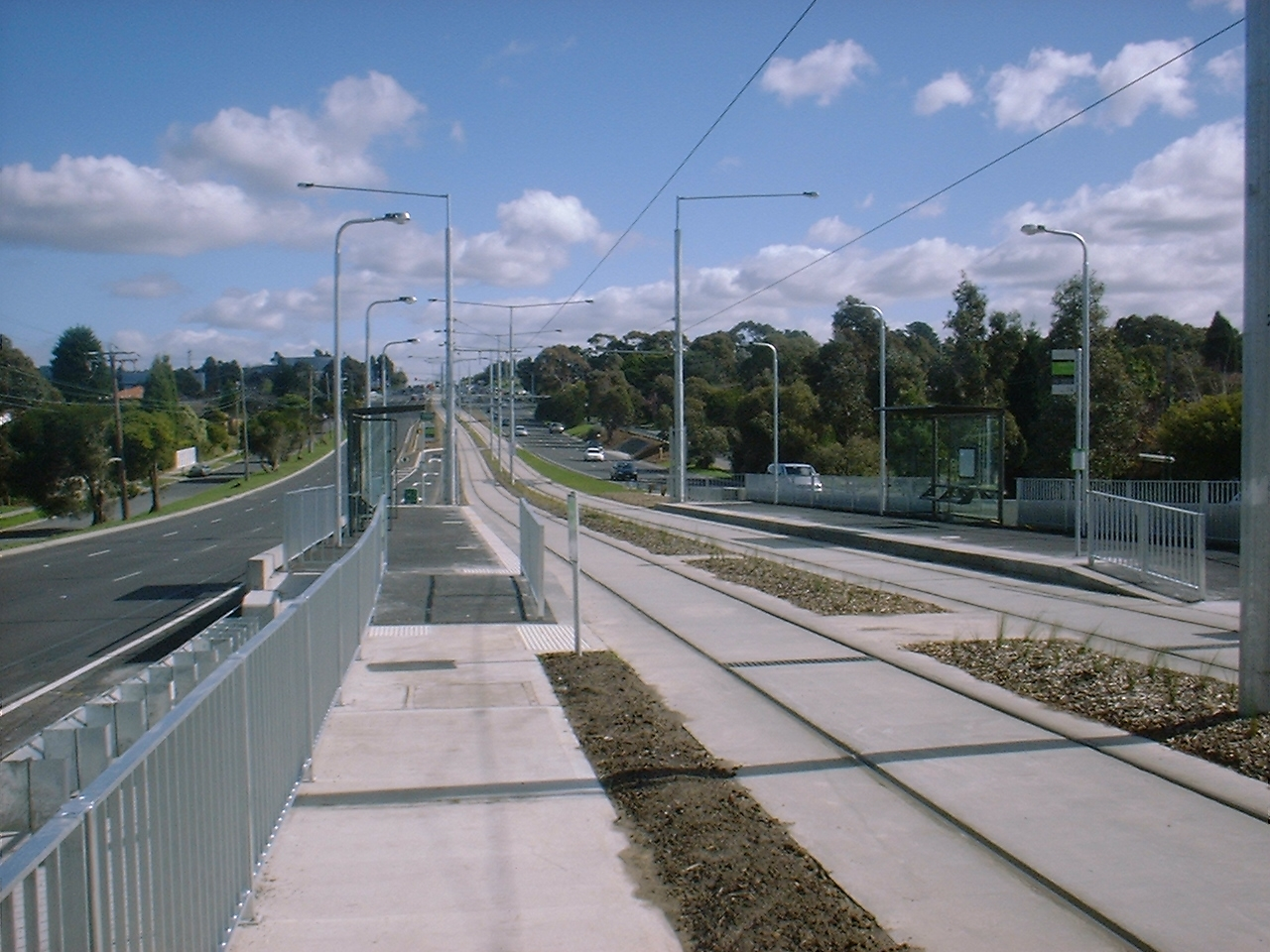
A new accessible stop at Stanley Road, August 2005

During the extension of the route from Burwood to Vermont South, all new stops were constructed as wheelchair accessible, low-floor platforms, with many other stops along the route converted to accessible platforms.

There has been controversy in the local newspaper, as even though the platforms are wheelchair accessible, the route is operated with high floor trams with steps. The upgrade has been criticised as a waste of money, because passengers using wheelchairs and other mobility-impaired passengers are still limited from accessing trams on the route.
