= Burwood railway station, Melbourne =

Railway station in Melbourne, Australia

Burwood
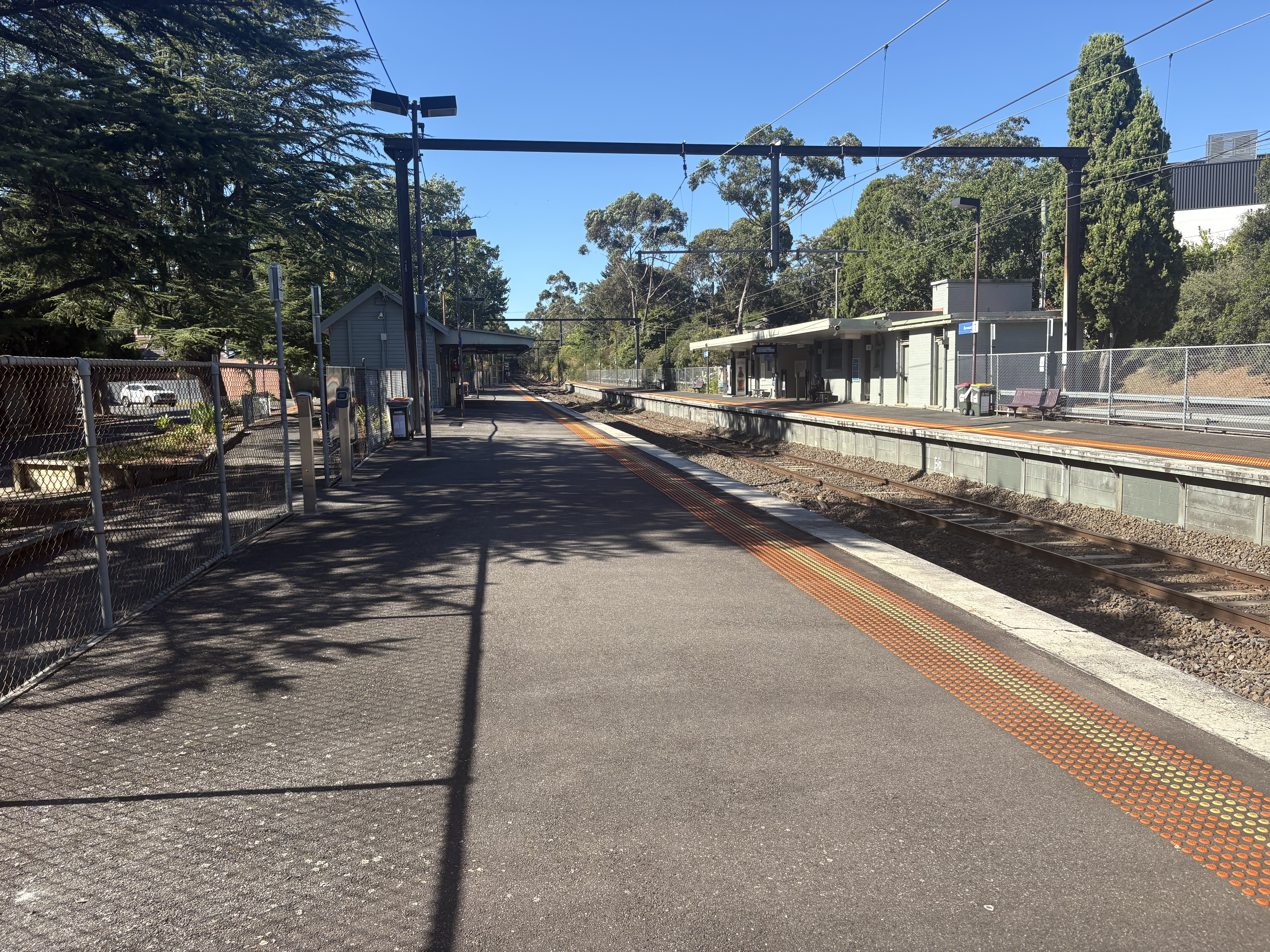
- Southbound view from Platform 2, March 2025

General information
- Location: Trent Street, Glen Iris, Victoria 3146; City of Boroondara; Australia
- Coordinates: 37°51′06″S 145°04′50″E
- System: PTV commuter rail station
- Owner: VicTrack
- Operator: Metro Trains
- Line: Alamein
- Distance: 14.17 kilometres from Southern Cross
- Platforms: 2 side
- Tracks: 2
- Connections: Tram

Construction
- Structure type: Ground
- Parking: 150
- Cycle facilities: Yes
- Accessible: No—steep ramp

Other information
- Status: Operational, unstaffed
- Station code: BWD
- Fare zone: Myki zone 1
- Website: Public Transport Victoria

History
- Opened: 30 May 1890; 136 years ago
- Rebuilt: 1954
- Electrified: October 1924 (1500 V DC overhead)
- Former names: Hartwell (1890–1909)

Passengers
- 2005–2006: 297,732
- 2006–2007: 327,334 ▲9.94%
- 2007–2008: 355,174 ▲8.5%
- 2008–2009: 373,574 ▲5.18%
- 2009–2010: 378,675 ▲1.36%
- 2010–2011: 381,104 ▲0.64%
- 2011–2012: 327,392 ▼14.09%
- 2012–2013: Not measured
- 2013–2014: 348,548 ▲6.46%
- 2014–2015: 342,033 ▼1.86%
- 2015–2016: 328,478 ▼3.96%
- 2016–2017: 331,891 ▲1.03%
- 2017–2018: 334,660 ▲0.83%
- 2018–2019: 357,550 ▲6.83%
- 2019–2020: 268,750 ▼24.83%
- 2020–2021: 106,400 ▼60.4%
- 2021–2022: 116,850 ▲9.82%
- 2022–2023: 194,700 ▲66.62%
- 2023–2024: 214,050 ▲9.94%
- 2024–2025: 221,250 ▲3.36%

Services
Preceding station	Metro Trains	Following station
Hartwell towards Flinders Street	Alamein line Peak only	Ashburton towards Alamein
Hartwell towards Camberwell	Alamein line Shuttle service	Ashburton towards Alamein
Former services
Preceding station	Disused railways	Following station
Riversdale towards Fairfield	Outer Circle line	Ashburton towards Oakleigh
	List of closed railway stations in Melbourne	
Track layout
Location

Burwood station is a railway station operated by Metro Trains Melbourne on the Alamein line, which is part of the Melbourne rail network. It serves the eastern suburb of Glen Iris, in Melbourne, Victoria, Australia. Burwood station is a ground level unstaffed station, featuring two side platforms. It opened on 30 May 1890, with the current station provided in 1954.

Initially opened as Hartwell, the station was given its current name of Burwood on 1 August 1909, the same day as the current Hartwell station was given its name.

== History ==
Burwood station opened on 30 May 1890. Originally named Hartwell, it was later renamed Burwood, after Burwood House, built by Sir James Frederick Palmer in 1852.

Burwood was on the second section of the Outer Circle line. From May 1897 until July 1898, the station became disused following the closure of the line. However, after a public outcry, the line and the station were reopened, being served by what became known as the Deepdene Dasher, a train consisting of one or two "American-style" carriages hauled by a steam locomotive.

In 1924, the line was electrified to the terminus at Ashburton. On 28 June 1948, the line was extended to Alamein, becoming the present-day Alamein line.

In 1954, the current station was provided, when duplication of the line occurred between Hartwell and Ashburton.

== Platforms and services ==
Burwood has two side platforms. It is served by Alamein line trains.

Burwood platform arrangement
Platform	Line	Destination	Via	Service Type	Notes	Source
1	Alamein line '	Camberwell		All stations	Offpeak and weekends.	
1	Alamein line '	Flinders Street	City Loop	All stations and limited express services	See City Loop for operating patterns Weekday peaks only.	
2	Alamein line	Alamein		All stations		

== Transport links ==
Yarra Trams operates one route via Burwood station:

- : Vermont South – Central Pier (Docklands)

== Gallery ==
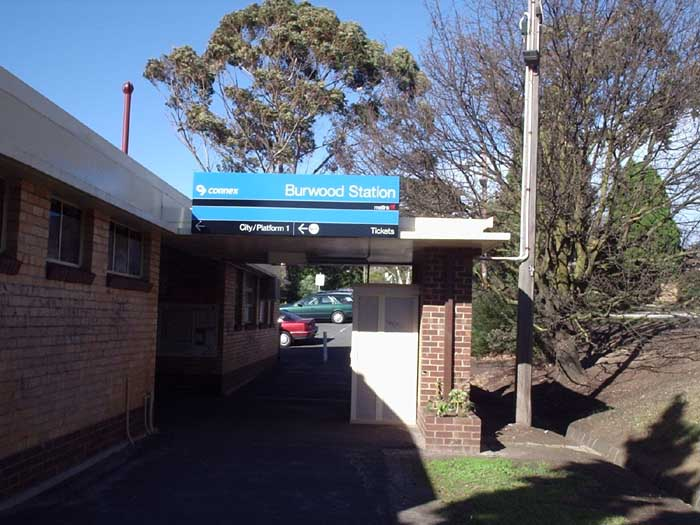
Building and entrance to Platform 1, March 2003

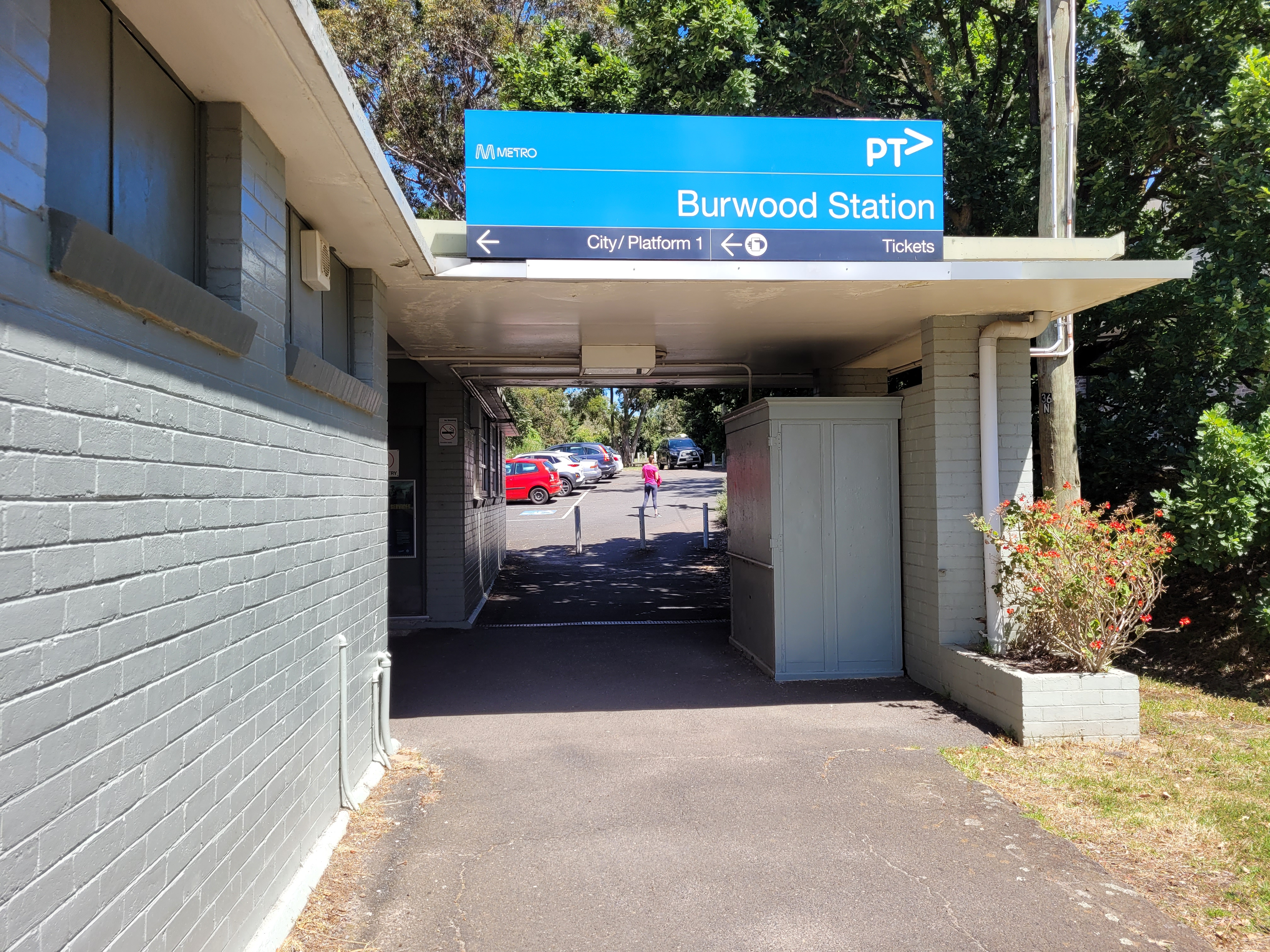
Building and entrance to Platform 1,
December 2020
