= Melbourne tram route 70 =

Tram route in metropolitan Melbourne, Victoria, Australia

Route 70

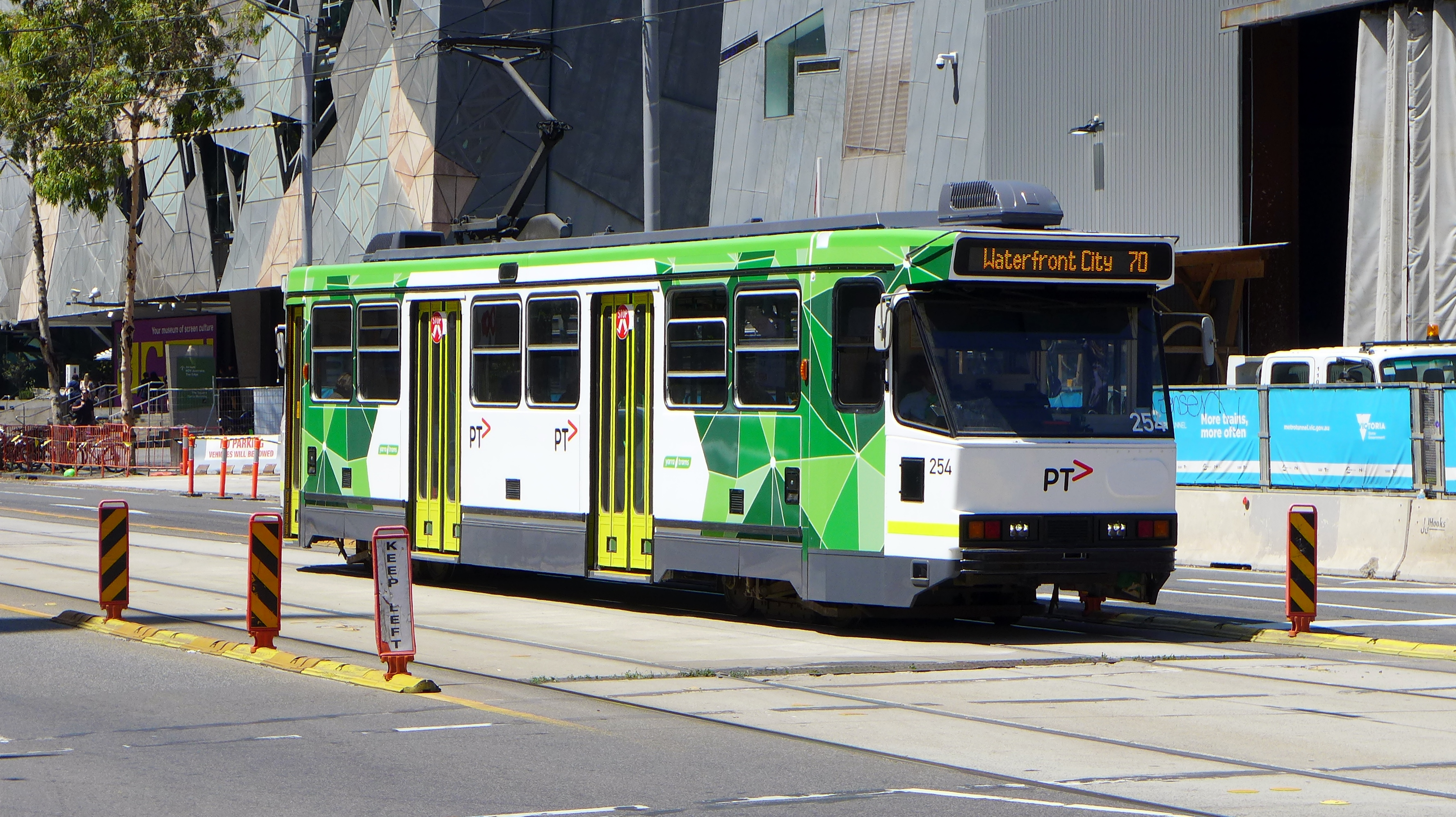
- A class tram on Flinders Street, February 2023

Overview
- System: Melbourne
- Operator: Yarra Trams
- Depot: Camberwell
- Vehicle: A class B class

Route
- Start: Waterfront City
- Via: Harbour Esplanade; Flinders Street; Richmond; Burnley; Hawthorn; Hawthorn East; Camberwell; Surrey Hills
- End: Wattle Park
- Length: 16.5 kilometres
- Timetable: Route 70 timetable
- Map: Route 70 map

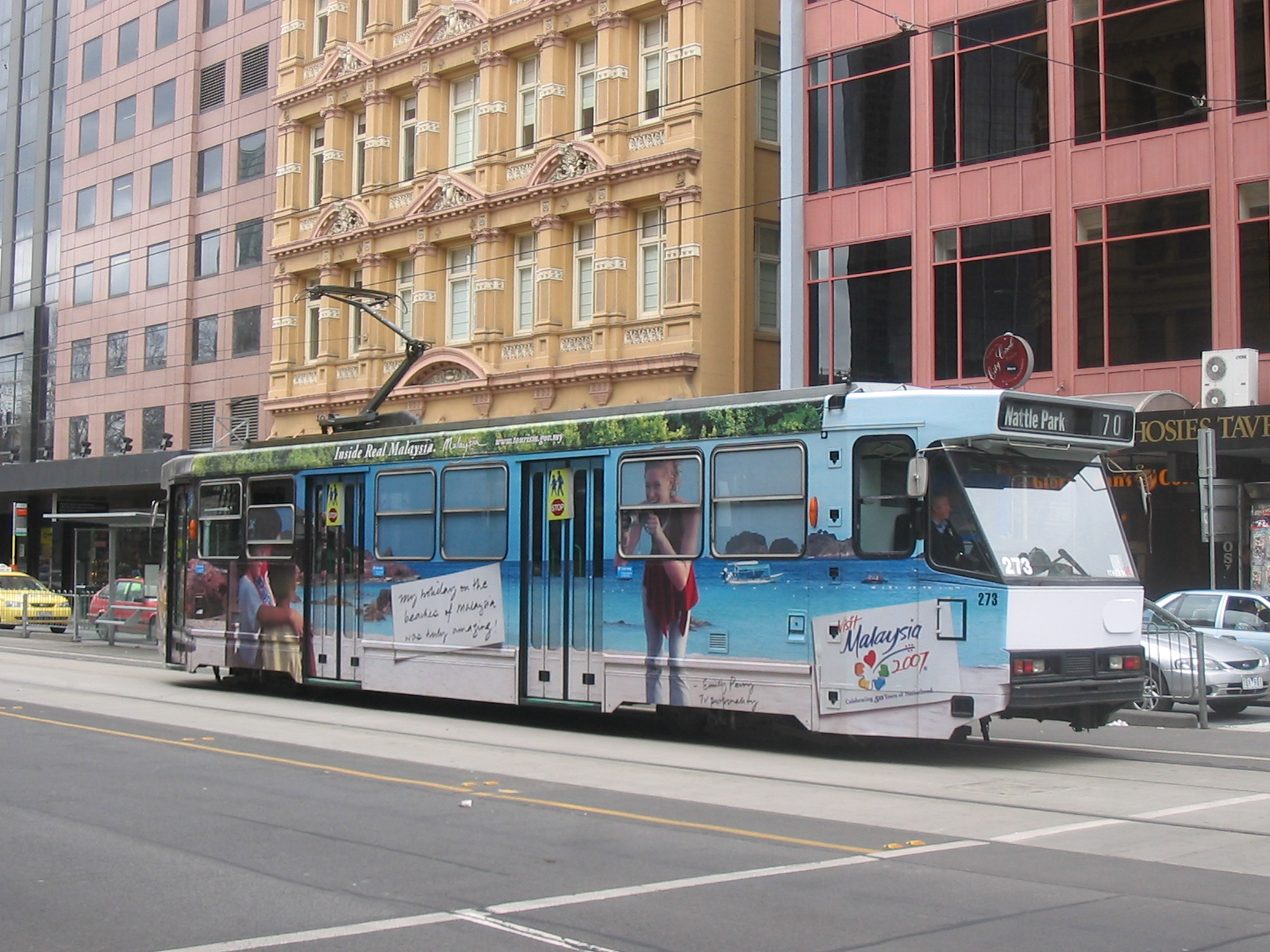
A class tram on Flinders Street, September 2006

Melbourne tram route 70 is a tram route on the Melbourne tramway network serving the city of Melbourne in Victoria, Australia. Operated by Yarra Trams, the route is coloured pink and extends from Waterfront City to Wattle Park over 16.5 kilometre of double track via Harbour Esplanade, Flinders Street, Richmond, Burnley, Hawthorn, Hawthorn East, Camberwell and Surrey Hills. It is serviced out of Camberwell depot utilising A and B class trams.

== History ==
Most of the line currently used by route 70 was initially built and run by the Hawthorn Tramways Trust (HTT) in 1916–17. It ran between the Batman Avenue terminus (opposite Flinders Street station) to the intersection of Warrigal Road (then Boundary Road) and Riversdale Road. At the time, the HTT's Batman Avenue line was Melbourne's only electric tram line that reached the CBD. The Melbourne & Metropolitan Tramways Board took over the line in 1920, and in 1928, extended the line a further two kilometres to Wattle Park at the Riversdale Road and Elgar Road intersection. In 1934, the line was given the route 70 designation, which it still holds today.

On 6 June 1999 it was diverted to operate via the Exhibition Street extension with a four-lane divided road built over the Jolimont Yard, enabling Batman Avenue west of Melbourne Park to be closed with route 70 extended to terminate at the intersection of Flinders and Spencer Streets. This new route was better able to serve all of the Melbourne Park venues such as the Melbourne Cricket Ground and Rod Laver Arena. Extra sidings were also built along the route in order to accommodate special events. On 5 December 1999, at the City end, the route was amended to terminate at new sidings west of Spencer Street.

On 4 May 2003, the route was extended along Spencer Street to the intersection of Spencer and La Trobe Streets, swapping route termini with route 75. Between May and November 2005, the route temporarily terminated at Market Street due to the closure and removal of the Flinders Street Overpass over King Street. After the works were completed, on 21 November 2005, the route was re-extended along Flinders Street and its permanent terminus was altered to the intersection of Bourke Street and Harbour Esplanade at Docklands, no longer running along Spencer Street. The route was extended to Waterfront City in September 2009 to replace route 48 which was re-routed away from Flinders Street and Waterfront City.

== Route ==
Interactive map of Melbourne tram route 70.

The route begins at Waterfront City, and runs along Docklands Drive, Harbour Esplanade and Flinders Street in the city, behind Melbourne Park at Richmond and then along Swan Street and Riversdale Road through Hawthorn and Camberwell to the eastern end of Wattle Park, terminating at Elgar Road.

Melbourne tram route 70 evolution
Dates	Route	Notes
9 December 1934 - 5 June 1999	Wattle Park to City (Batman Avenue)	
6 June 1999 - 3 May 2003	Wattle Park to City (Flinders / Spencer Streets)	via Flinders Street
4 May 2003 - 21 May 2005	Wattle Park to City (Spencer / La Trobe Streets)	via Flinders Street and Spencer Street
22 May 2005 - 20 November 2005	Wattle Park to City (Flinders / Market Streets)	Temporary arrangement due to the closure and removal of the Flinders Street Overpass
21 November 2005 - 19 September 2009	Wattle Park to Docklands (Harbour Esplanade / Bourke Street)	via Flinders Street and Harbour Esplanade
20 September 2009 - present	Wattle Park to Waterfront City	via Flinders Street and Harbour Esplanade

== Operation ==
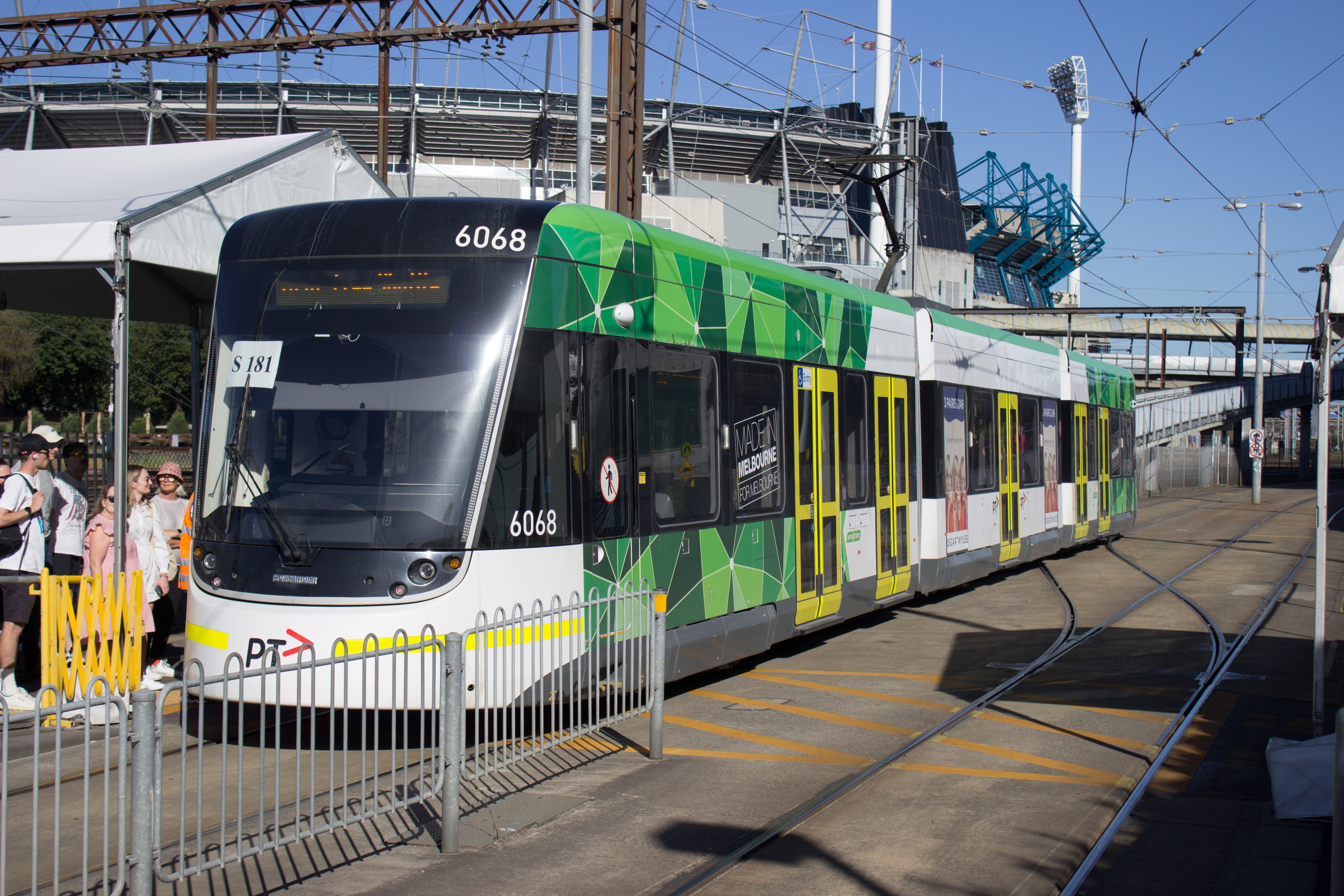
E class tram on shuttle route 70a outside Melbourne Park, January 2023

Route 70 is operated out of Camberwell depot with a mix of A class trams and B class trams. During the Australian Open, additional services run between Melbourne Park and the city. These services are numbered as route 70a and operated by E class trams.
