= Wattle Park, Melbourne =

Park in Burwood, Melbourne, Victoria, Australia

Wattle Park
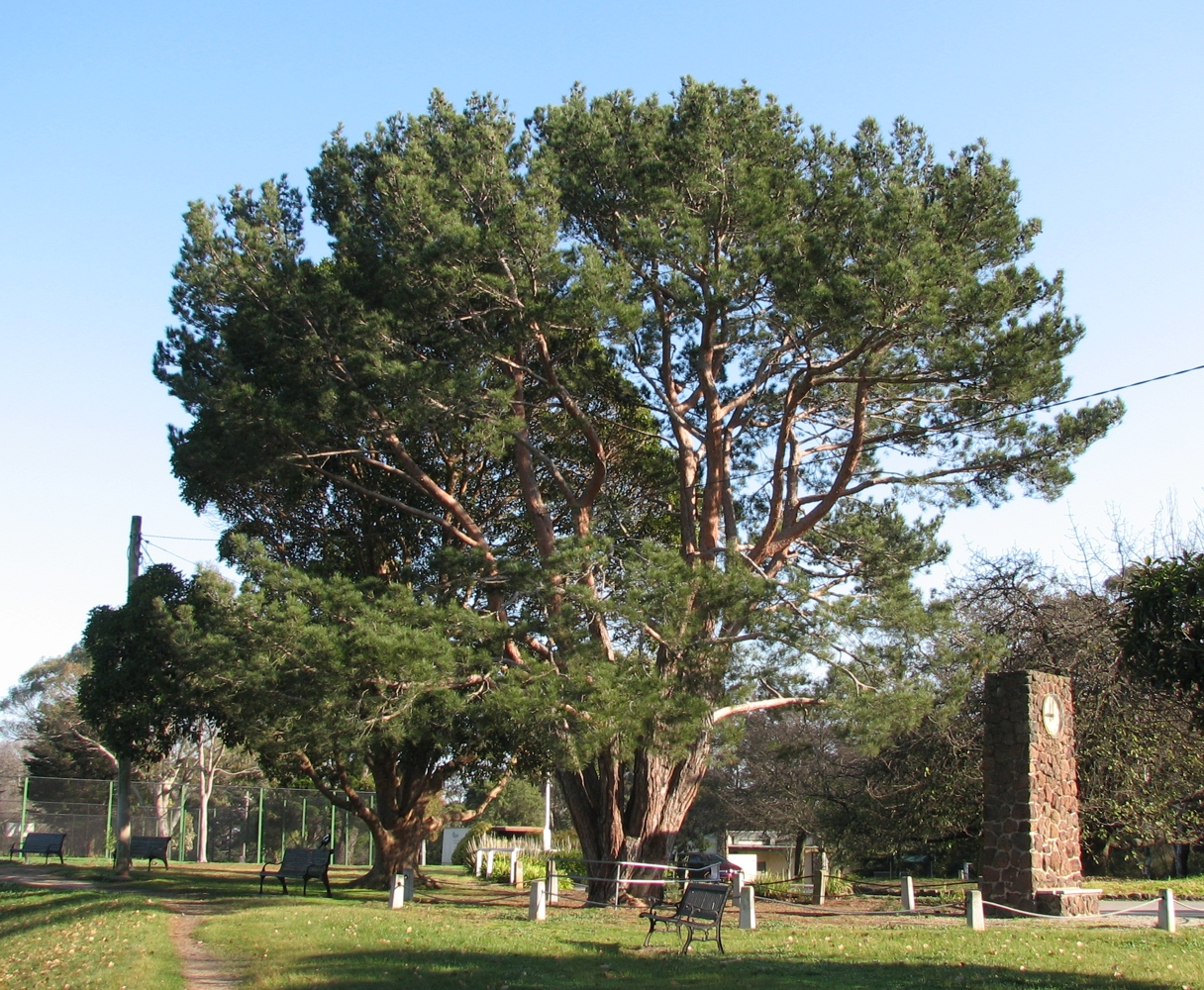
- The "Lone Pine" and clock tower

- Location within Melbourne
- Interactive map of Wattle Park
- Type: Urban park
- Location: Burwood, Victoria
- Nearest city: Melbourne
- Coordinates: 37°50′20″S 145°06′16″E
- Area: 41 ha (100 acres)
- Established: 23 December 1916 (opened to the public)
- Opened: 31 March 1917; 109 years ago (official opening)
- Founder: Hawthorn Tramway Trust
- Designer: Alan Monsborough; George William Tickner
- Etymology: Acacia pycnantha
- Operator: Parks Victoria
- Status: Open
- Paths: 3.25 km (2.02 mi) walking/running
- Water: Kooyongkoot Creek (Gardiners Creek)
- Vegetation: sp. Acacia; sp. eucalyptus; other Australian native plants
- Plants: 12,000 trees, many planted by notable individuals, visiting celebrities, the Wattle League, special interest groups, and school children
- Species: 20 sp. butterflies; 60 sp. beetles; 50 sp. birds
- Public transit: – Union; –; – 903, 281, 767, 768
- Landmarks: Wattle Park Chalet; Lone Pine; 'W' class Melbourne trams
- Facilities: Toilets; barbecues; playground; golf course; tennis courts
- Website: parks.vic.gov.au

Victorian Heritage Register
- Official name: Wattle Park
- Type: Registered place
- Designated: 1 April 1992
- Reference no.: H0904
- Categories: Community Facilities; Parks, Gardens and Trees; Recreation and Entertainment
- Heritage overlay no.: HO194
- Architectural style: Interwar Period (c. 1919 – c. 1940); Old English

Wattle Park is a 41-hectare (100-acre) (Note: Master Plan, 2023, states 41 ha (100 acres), while both the Conservation Management Plan, 2023 and Brochure, 2018, state 55 ha (140 acres). The difference is most likely an adjustment to the boundary in 2021 as a result of feedback from Wurundjeri Woi-wurung people.) urban park in Burwood, a suburb of Melbourne, in Victoria, Australia. It is known for its plantation of 12,000 wattle trees. Maintained by Parks Victoria, the park provides public open space for recreation, as well as sporting facilities, and a wedding and function venue. Named in honour of Australia's proposed national floral emblem, the Golden Wattle, (Note: Adopted as a floral emblem by virtue of the Commonwealth Armorial Ensigns and Supporters, granted by Royal Warrant on 19 September 1912; however, not officially gazetted until 1 September 1988.) the park was established by the Hawthorn Tramway Trust in 1917 and an ongoing connection is maintained with Melbourne's tramways.

A large proportion of Wattle Park was added to the Victorian Heritage Register on 1 April 1992. The park is located on the traditional lands of the Wurundjeri Woi-wurung people.

== Location and facilities ==
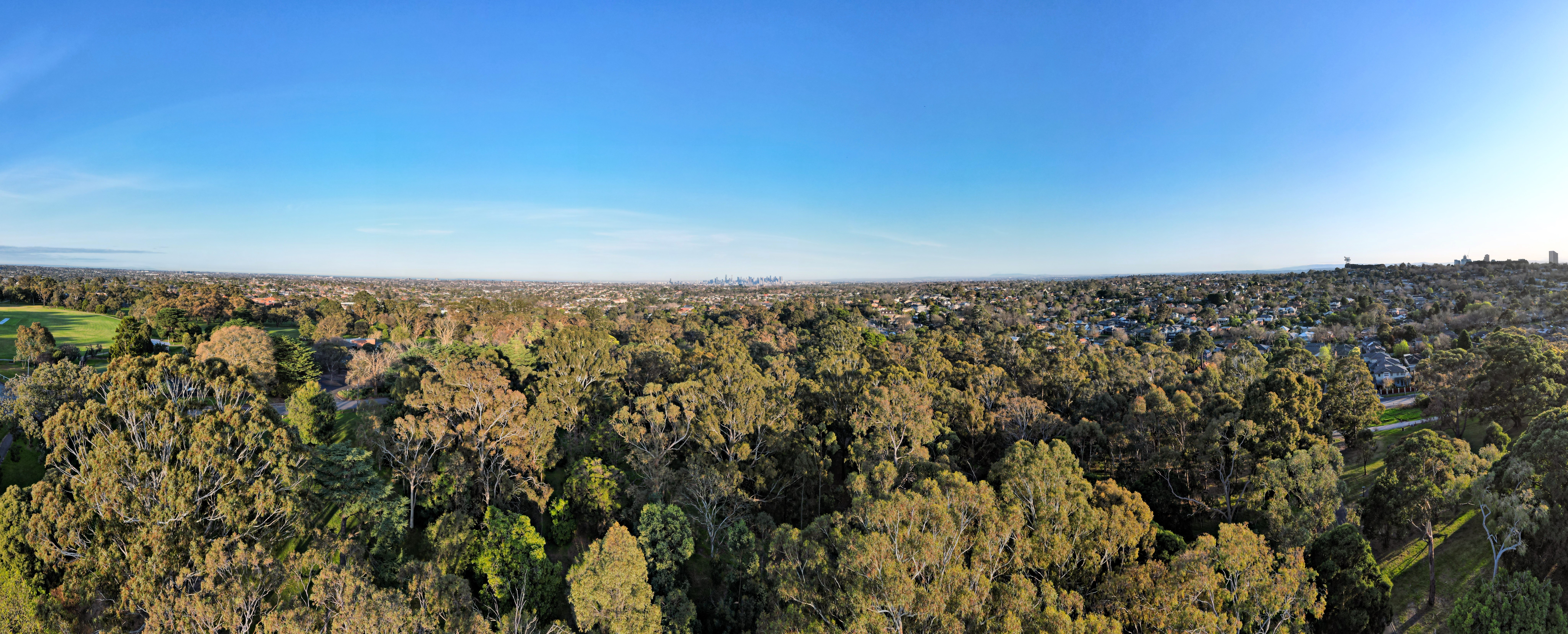
Aerial view of the park, facing Melbourne's skyline, 2023

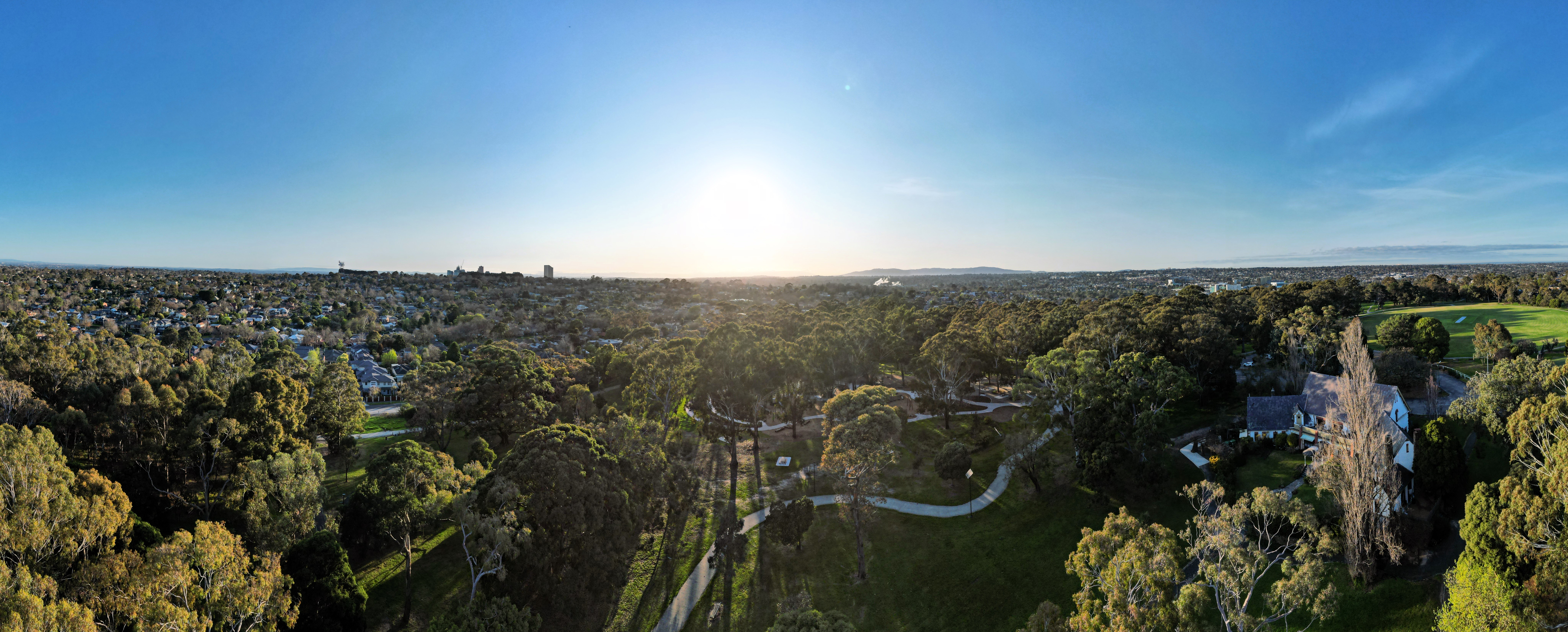
Aerial view of sunrise over the park, facing the Dandenong Ranges, 2023

Wattle Park is located in the Melbourne suburb of Burwood within the City of Whitehorse local government area, approximately 13 kilometres (8.1 mi) east of the Melbourne central business district. Facilities include two children's playgrounds, barbecues, tables and seats, public toilets, a war memorial clocktower, stables, a lily pond, sculptures and Indigenous interpretive elements, a large grassed sports oval, a nine-hole public golf course and tennis courts with cafe, two heritage 'W' class Melbourne trams offer shelter, walking tracks through the bush and a perimeter track, and the Wattle Park Chalet – a wedding and function centre. Dogs are permitted in the park on a lead.

=== Wattle Park Chalet ===
The Wattle Park Chalet was built in 1928 as a tea-house and function venue. It is an elegant structure in the rustic Tudor style of English architect Sir Edwin Lutyens. The Wattle Park Chalet was designed by Alan Monsborough, an architect employed by the Melbourne & Metropolitan Tramways Board, and is located at the centre of Wattle Park. The timber beams used for building the chalet were recycled from other, earlier structures; the roof slates came from the former Yarra Bend Asylum; the bricks came from cable tram engine-house chimneys; and the stonework was recycled from derelict drystone walls. The front porch was added later, in 1937.

The chalet is believed to be the oldest continuously running wedding venue in Melbourne; and is an example of a building constructed by a public utility, largely from recycled materials.

The construction of the chalet involved several sub-contractors. Unions stopped construction work on 7 March 1928, demanding that all workers on the site be paid at construction industry rates, rather than the 'mixed rate' of tramways workers. Work resumed approximately four weeks later at the same pay rate but on the understanding that the issue would be revisited.

Two smaller single-storey wings branch off the chalet's main hall. The west wing originally contained the caretaker's residence, and the east wing contained the kitchen and kiosk. Between the wings was a paved courtyard. The paving was recycled from the former tramway engine house on Alexandra Avenue and old cable tram sheds.

Part of the chalet was significantly damaged by a fire on 12 September 2026.

=== Heritage and the Lone Pine ===
A large proportion of the park is recorded as a registered place by Heritage Victoria, added in 1992 to the statutory Victorian Heritage Register, and the National Trust of Australia also added the park complex, including the Chalet and associated structures, to its non-statutory heritage list.

The "Lone Pine" tree growing near the main carpark is listed on the National Trust's Significant Tree Register, being one of the country's few original Lone Pines. The tree was grown from the seed of a cone collected by one of the Australian soldiers involved in the Gallipoli Campaign from the lone pine tree in Gallipoli, Turkey as a reminder of this notable battle and the ANZACs' involvement in World War I. Planted in Wattle Park on 8 May 1933 at the Trooping of the Colour by the 24th Battalion, the tree was the first Lone Pine to ever be publicly planted as an ANZAC memorial, pre-dating the one planted at Melbourne's Shrine of Remembrance by a month, and the one at the Australian War Memorial in Canberra by seventeen months.

=== Flora and fauna ===
The park contains areas of indigenous remnant bush land which has been identified as regionally significant on the basis of its high diversity of common native fauna in a suburban environment.

There are recorded to be at least twenty species of butterfly, sixty species of beetle, three species of frogs, bats, skinks, ringtail and brushtail possums. The park's bird life includes kookaburras, rosellas, rainbow lorikeets, galahs, and gang-gang cockatoos.

== History ==
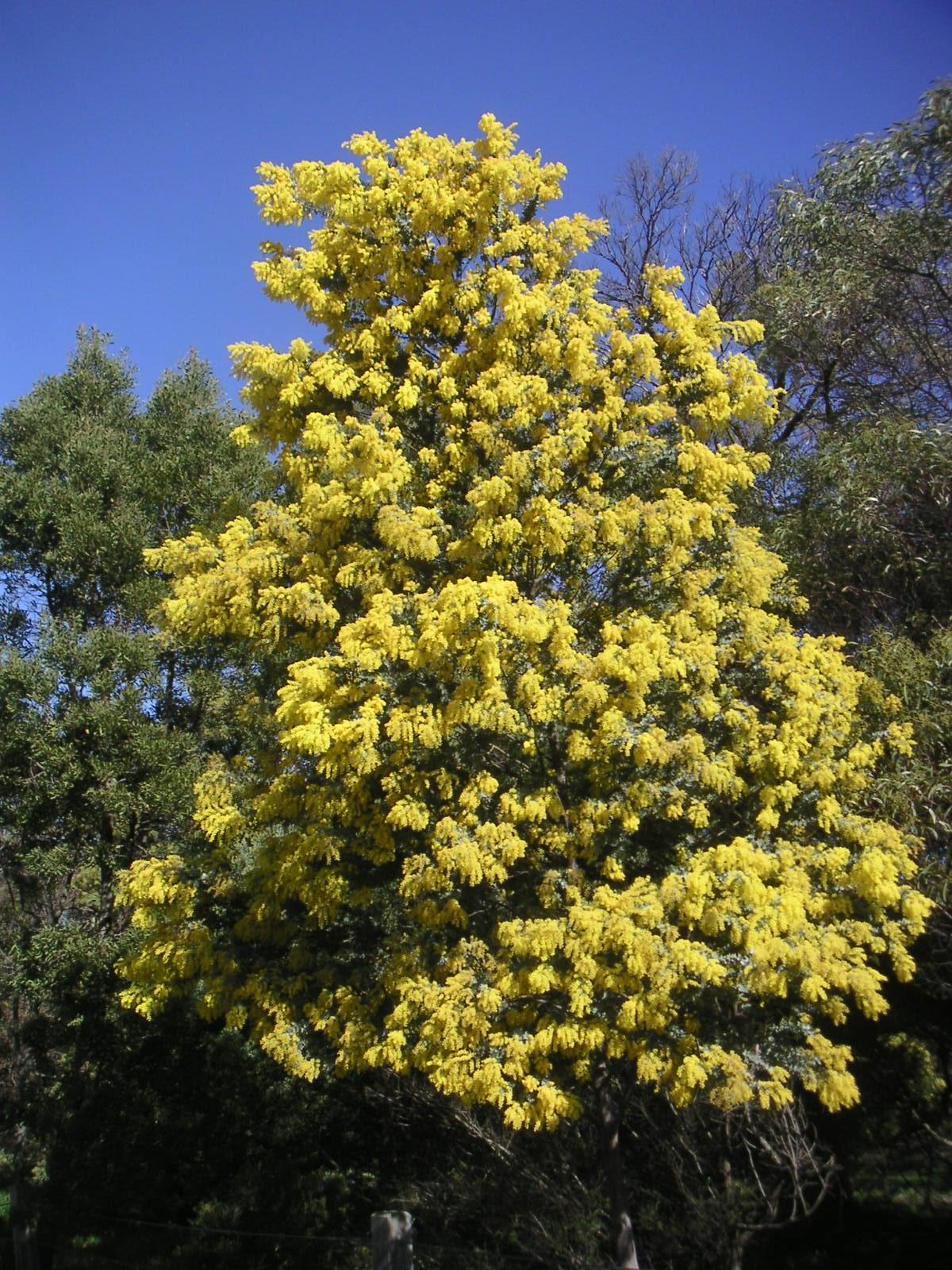
A small wattle tree in bloom, Spring 2006

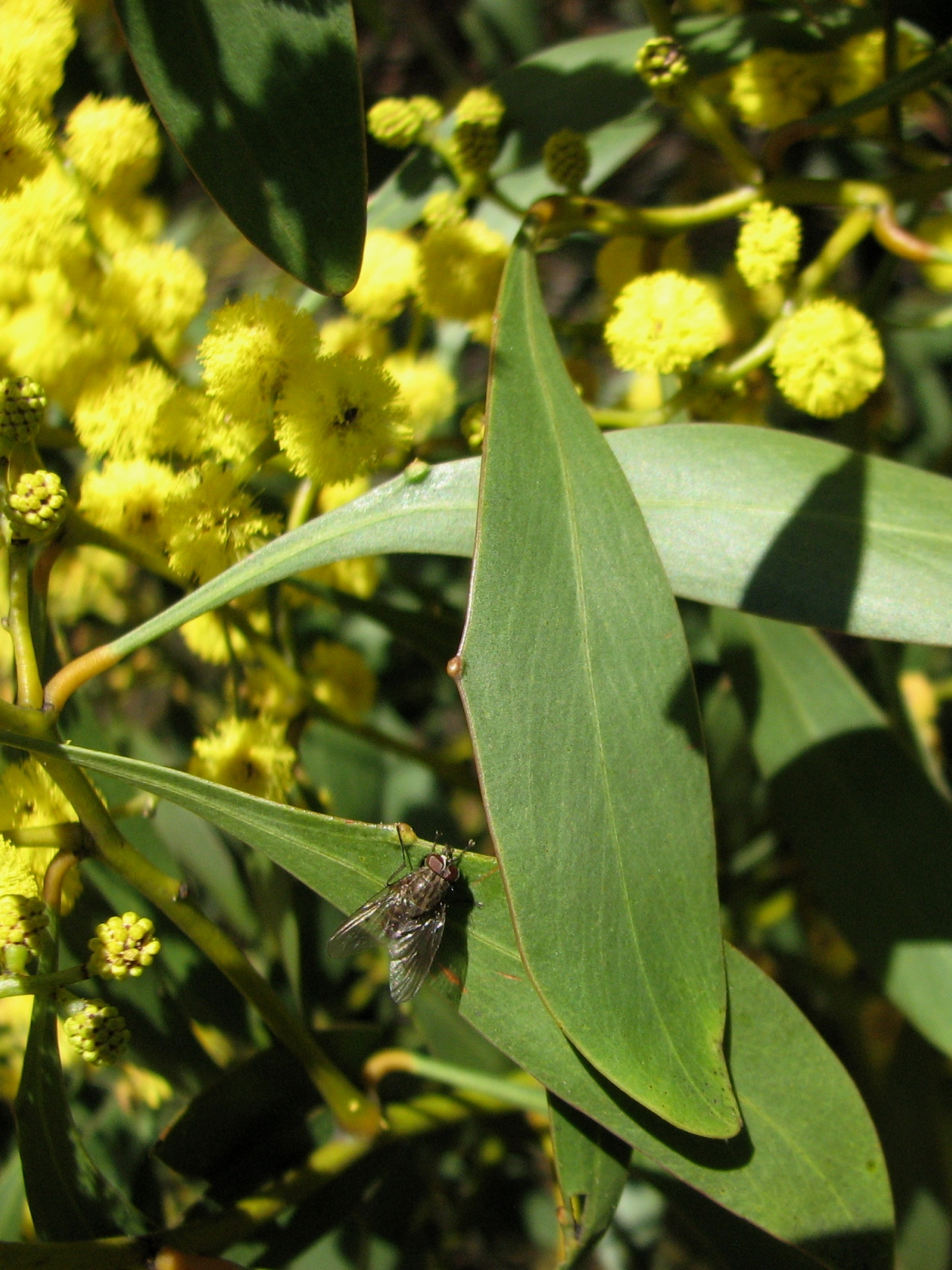
A close up of an Acacia pycnantha in the park

The park was created when the Hawthorn Tramway Trust (HTT) purchased 55 hectares (137 acres) for A£9,000 from Eliza Welch, the widow of the owner of the Ball and Welch department store, under the condition it was to be used as a public park. The site was formerly the location of the residence of Orlando Fenwick, a longstanding councillor for the City of Melbourne who had been Lord Mayor between 1871 and 1872. It was known as Fenwick's Paddock when purchased for approximately A£2,500 by Mrs. Welch. Open to the public in December 1916, the park was officially opened on 31 March 1917 when the Governor, Sir Arthur Stanley, planted a Golden Wattle (Acacia pycnantha) and named the park. Both the Field Naturalists Club of Victoria and the Victorian Wattle League were influential in encouraging the establishment and development of the park.

Further development of the park was delayed in its early years due to the financial troubles of the HHT, that was subsequently amalgamated into the Melbourne & Metropolitan Tramways Board. Work on electrifying Melbourne's cable tramways caused further delays in the park's development. In 1926 a plantation of 12,000 wattle trees were laid out in a wide belt as a hedge around the outskirts of the area. Lawns and flower beds were installed, winding pathways built, and a small stream trickling through the centre of the park was cleaned, widened, and fringed with willows and poplars. On the north eastern slopes, a natural forest—consisting chiefly of poplars, gums, woolly butt and eucalyptus longifolia—was preserved. Fencing posts around the boundaries of the park were manufactured from old tramway, rails, and a children's joy wheel was made from a former tramway wooden spool for cables.

The Wattle Park Chalet was completed in 1928 and served as a tea house for light refreshments and recreation, as well as a scenic wedding and function venue. The chalet was built on the highest slope in the park, approximately 98 metres (320 ft) above sea level, and a splendid panoramic view of Melbourne could be seen from its balconies.

Children's playgrounds were laid out: swings, joy wheels, a wading pool and other attractions. Cable car dummies were transformed into shelters and places where meals could be enjoyed. A sports oval was laid out alongside the chalet, along with two tennis courts. Facing Boundary-Road, (now Warrigal Road) was one of the most conspicuous spots in the park, a miniature lake planted with water lilies and stocked with goldfish. This lake used to be the dam of the old homestead. A 9-hole golf course opened at Wattle Park in October 1937, also designed by Monsborough, with other facilities following later.

Most of the trees at Wattle Park were planted by George William Tickner, (Note: Tickner later changed his name by Deed poll to George Nelson.) the head landscape gardener and curator, who had built his own home at 14 Patterson Avenue, opposite the park. Tickner was responsible for the planning, laying out, design and construction of the tennis courts, golf course, pond, lake, paths, walking tracks, sports oval and many other structures in the park. Employed by the Tramways Board in the 1920s, Wattle Park was his life's work.

With the rise of popularity of motor cars in the 1960s and 1970s, the MMTB and from June 1983, the Metropolitan Transit Authority, focused its attention elsewhere. Subsequently, local residents began to complain to the state government about the poor state of Wattle Park. In June 1989, ownership of Wattle Park was passed to the Public Transport Corporation, and in 1991 to the Melbourne & Metropolitan Board of Works, which undertook a program to rehabilitate the park's landscape, and vested in Parks Victoria in 1996.

=== Connection with trams ===
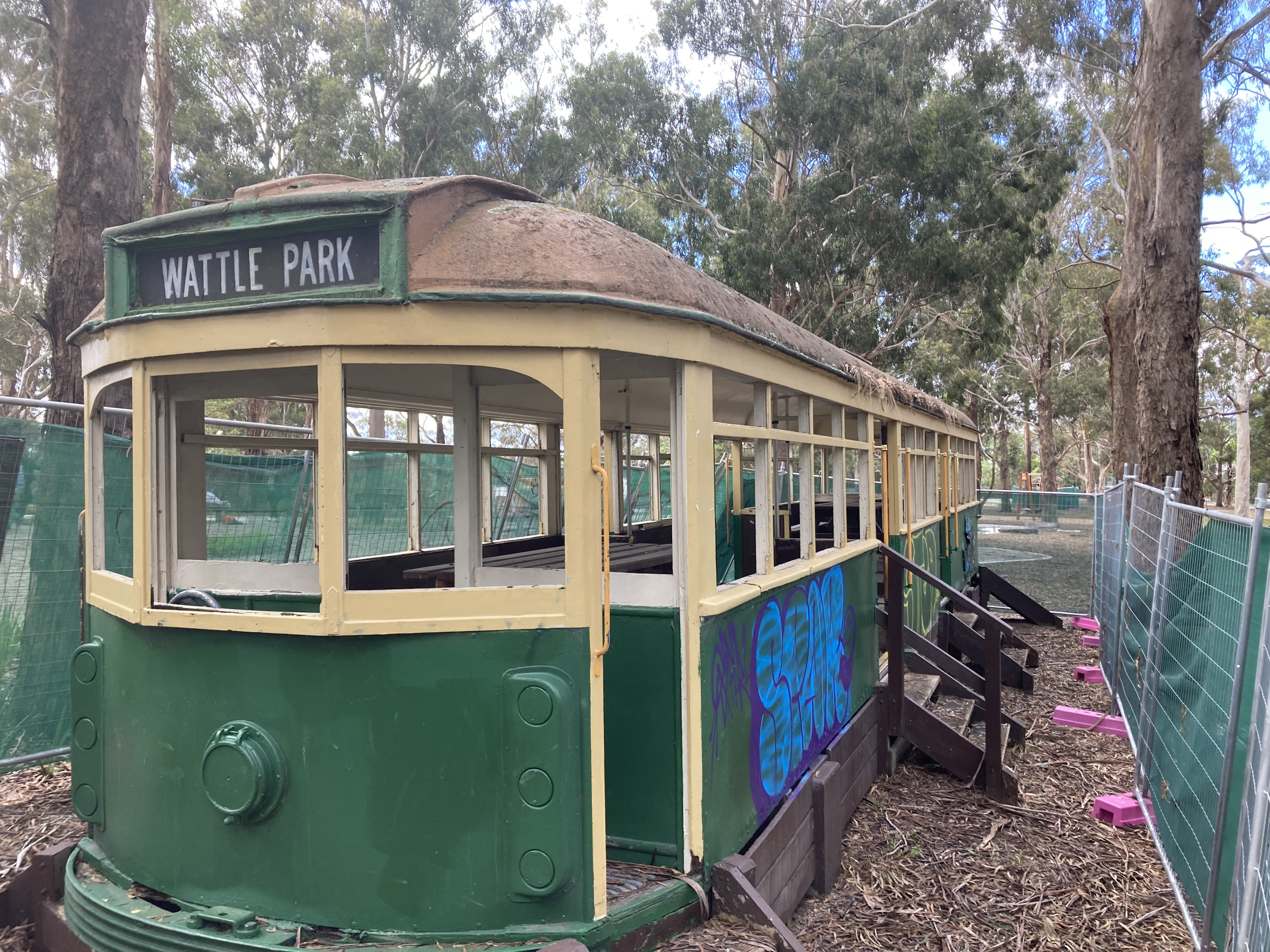
SW6 class tram number 936 inside the park in 2023, awaiting restoration

Wattle Park, for most of its history, was maintained by Melbourne's tram operators and has retained a connection with Melbourne's tramways. The Melbourne Transit Band has played in the band rotunda once a month during spring and autumn, since 1941. The bodies of two SW6 class trams (number 861 and 936) were installed as shelters at Wattle Park; after a previous SW6 tram body (number 885) was burnt by vandals in December 2011.

Tram route 70 runs along the park's northern boundary, with its terminus at the easternmost end of the park.

== See also ==
- Parks and gardens of Melbourne
- Heritage gardens in Australia
- List of heritage-listed buildings in Melbourne
- Wattle Day
- Archibald James Campbell
