= Augustus Andrew Fritsch =

Australian architect

- Born: 1866
- Died: 1933 (aged 66–67)
- Other name: A. A. Fritsch
- Occupation: Architect
- Years active: 1888 – c. 1920s
- Spouse: Alice Mason (m. 1893)
- Parents: Gustav Augustus Fritsch (father); Christina Fritsch (née Holzer) (mother)
- Relatives: Augustus Alfonso Fritsch (son)
- Practice: Frisch & Fritsch
- Design: Romanesque Revival red-brick Roman Catholic churches in Victoria

Augustus Andrew Fritsch (1866-1933), known as A. A. Fritsch, was an Australian architect best known for a series of Romanesque Revival style red brick Roman Catholic churches built across Victoria from the 1900s to the 1920s.

== Early years ==
Augustus Andrew Fritsch was born in 1866 to Gustav Augustus Fritsch and Christina Fritsch (née Holzer). The Fritsch's were a pioneer family who had arrived in Australia in 1849 from Silesia in the Kingdom of Prussia. Gustav Augustus was a successful brickmaker, a partner of the Upper Hawthorn Brick Company, along with his in-laws, the Holzer brothers, begun in 1883. The factory employed around 50 people and produced 250,000 bricks a week, which were used throughout Victoria. The brickworks site in Hawthorn near Camberwell Junction eventually became a park in 1995, known as Fritsch Holzer Park.

Fritsch began his architectural career by being articled to prolific architect John Beswicke, who lived locally in Hawthorn and designed many houses and shops in the area. At a young age he travelled through Europe and completed his training in the United States, before opening his own office in 1888 in Melbourne.

Remaining in Hawthorn, in his early years he was particularly active in the Camberwell / Hawthorn area, designing several houses in the late 1880s and 1890s, including for instance a pair of boom-style cottages in 1890 for his uncle Anton Holzer at 13-19 Carnavon Street, next to the brickworks. In 1893 he married Alice Mason, from Bendigo.

== Architectural career ==
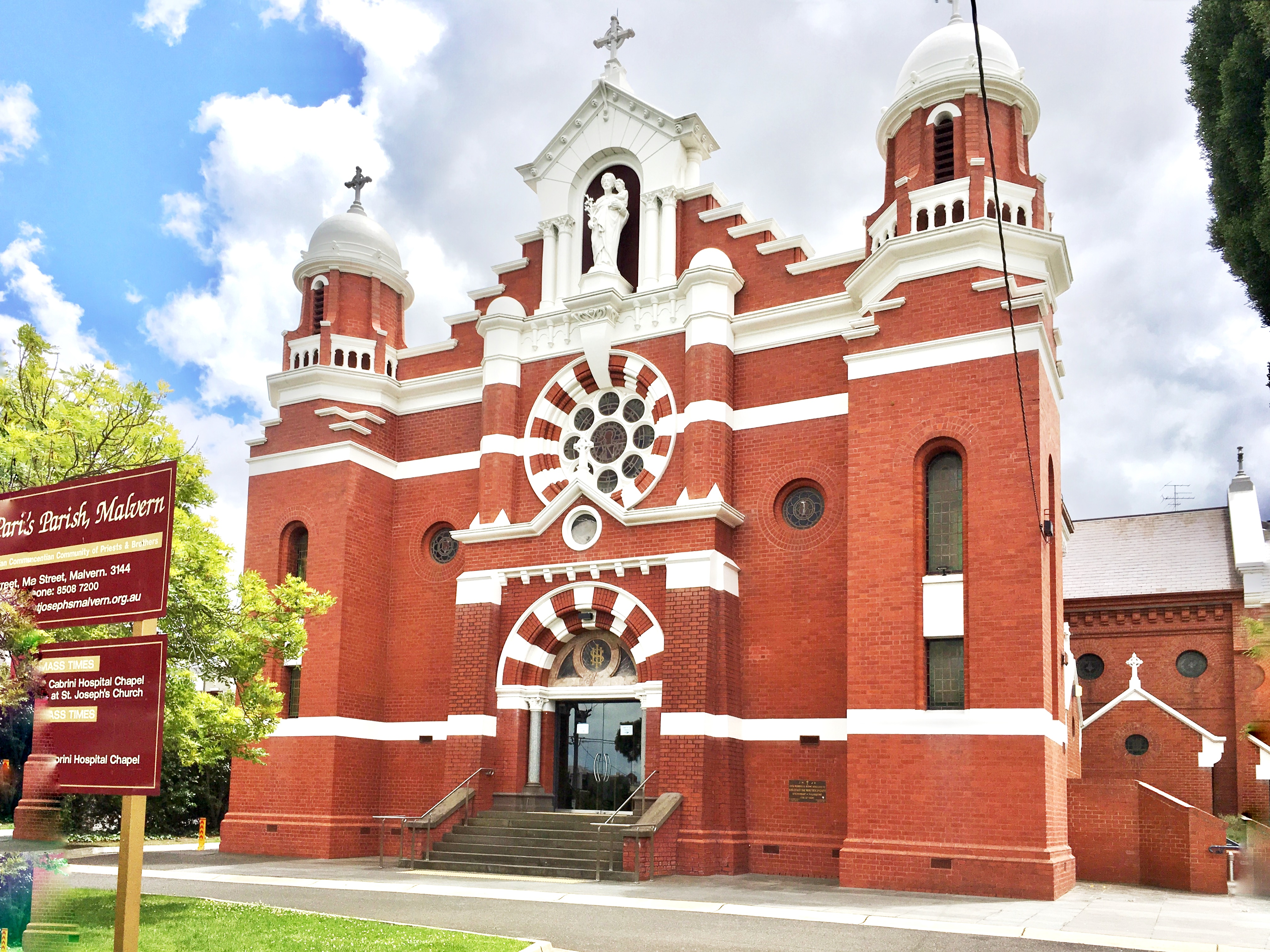
St Joseph's, Malvern

The commission in 1894 for a presbytery for St Joseph's in Malvern, in the form of a large verandahed Victorian style house, marked the start of his long association with the Catholic Church, designing churches, convents, halls, and schools across Victoria over the next 35 years.

His first major church commission was replacing the church adjacent to his earlier presbytery at St Joseph's in Malvern in 1908, which was designed in a striking broadly Romanesque Revival form, in red brick with round arches, a rose window and a barrel vaulted interior, but also with details drawn from the Baroque like the paired cupolas, and a Flemish stepped gable. The red brick Romanesque Revival was a style adopted by other architects in this period for many Catholic projects, such as the grand St Joseph's in Benalla by Kempson & Connelly, also completed in 1908. Fritsch followed this trend in a more restrained manner than his first church, starting with St Joseph's Rochester in 1910, which set the forms and details he used for his series red brick Romanesque Revival churches over the next 20 years. These included the use of red brick with restrained rendered detailing, a tall gabled front with a central statuary niche and central window, banded voussoirs (first used at St Joseph's), attached piers that rise up as spirelets, and stepped gables. St Brigids, Port Fairy (1914), St Marys Corowa (1921), St Marys Maffra (1924) Our Lady Of Mount Carmel, Middle Park (1928) all follow this form. St Marys, Yarram (1915), St Brendans, Flemington (1925) and St Columbas, Elwood (1929) are also similar, but with the addition of towers – though only St Columba's was completed.

He also designed some churches in a more standard Gothic Revival mode, including St Augustine's, Kyabram (1910), Immaculate Conception, Ararat (1928), as well as the tower of St Alpius' Ballarat, the completion of an 1874 church in 1924. Another Gothic church which he added to while matching the earlier style was the landmark Immaculate Conception in Hawthorn, where he completed the transepts, adding a second, and vestries, complete with a small tower on busy Glenferrie Road, and completed the spire, in 1921.

Our Lady of Victories in Camberwell is his best known and most interesting church; built 1913-18 it is a much more thorough example of the Romanesque Revival, with large round arched widows and simple massing, given added weight by the use of rough-faced sandstone, and is topped by a landmark copper dome.

St Mary's, Bairnsdale is another very well known design, particularly for its landmark tower and painted interior, but only the rear half was built to his design in 1913, with the far taller tower than originally intended added by his son 20 years later.

In 1915 he was named as one of the architects for Newman College at Melbourne University; the actual design is attributed to Walter Burley Griffin, with Fritsch in a supervisory role.

Throughout this period, he also designed many other type of buildings such as chapels, church halls, convents, and school buildings, often new wings or extensions to existing sites, but also completely new ones, such as the Gothic style St Mary's Convent, Beechworth, and the classically styled St Patrick's College, Sale.

== Later life ==
Fritsch's son, who was also A A (Augustus Alfonso) Fritsch (1882–1973), was trained in his father's office, and worked with him throughout his period of church work. He was finally made partner of the firm in 1932, just before his father's death aged 67 in 1933. Augustus Alfonso renamed the firm Fritsch & Fritsch and continued the long association with the Catholic Church, though far less prolific. He is best known for the front and lofty tower added to his father's earlier St Mary's, Bairnsdale in 1936.

== Notable projects ==
=== A A Fristch ===
Year	Name	Location	Project type	Notes
1894	St Joseph's	Malvern	Presbytery	
1898	Brigidine Convent	Echuca	Chapel	
1902	St Mary's Convent	Beechworth		
1908	St Joseph's	Malvern	Church	
1910	St Augustine's	Kyabram		
1913	St Mary's	Bairnsdale	Nave and sanctuary	
1914	St Brigid's	Port Fairy		
1914	St John's	Glenmaggie	Church	
c. 1914	Assumption College	Kilmore	Stage 1	
c. 1914	St Joseph’s Receiving Home	Carlton	Additions/extensions	
1915	St Mary's	Yarram		
1918	Our Lady of Victories Basilica	Camberwell	Minor basilica	
1918	Our Lady Of Mount Carmel	Middle Park	Church hall	
1920	St Patrick's College	Sale		
1921	Immaculate Conception	Hawthorn	Transept, vestry, and spire	
1921	St Mary's	Corowa, NSW		
1924	St Mary's	Maffra		
1924	St Alpius'	Ballarat	Completion of tower	
1924	Brigidine Convent School	Malvern	Classrooms, since demolished	
1925	St Brendan's	Flemington		
1928	Our Lady Of Mount Carmel	Middle Park		
1928	Immaculate Conception	Ararat		
1929	St Columba's Church	Elwood		
1930	Victorian Spiritualists' Hall	Victoria Street, Melbourne	Hall, since demolished	
1931	Kildara Brigidine Convent and School	Malvern	Chapel, since demolished	

=== Frisch & Fritsch ===
Year	Name	Location	Project type	Notes
1932	St. Joseph’s Foundling Hospital and infants home	Broadmeadows	New wings	
1933	Redemptorist Monastery	Ballarat	North wing addition	
1936	St Mary's	Bairnsdale	Façade and tower	
1936	St Michael's	Traralgon		
1937	Assumption College	Kilmore	Quadrangle addition (now Fouverie Centre)	
1938	St Fidelis'	Coburg		
1940	Foundling Hospital	Broadmeadows	Nurses home and woman’s dormitory	

== Gallery ==
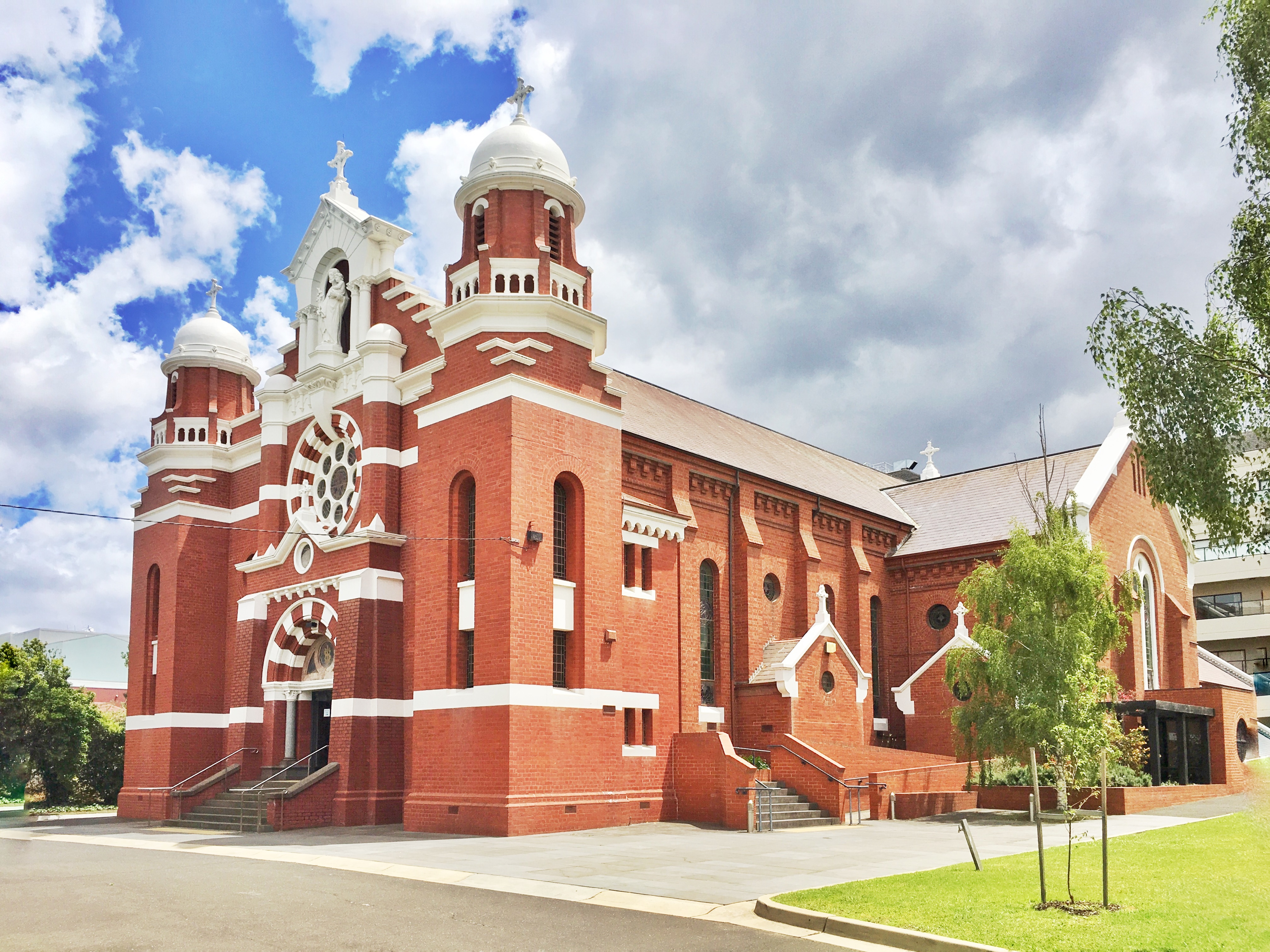
St Joseph's, Malvern, 1908

Our Lady of Victories, Camberwell, 1913–18

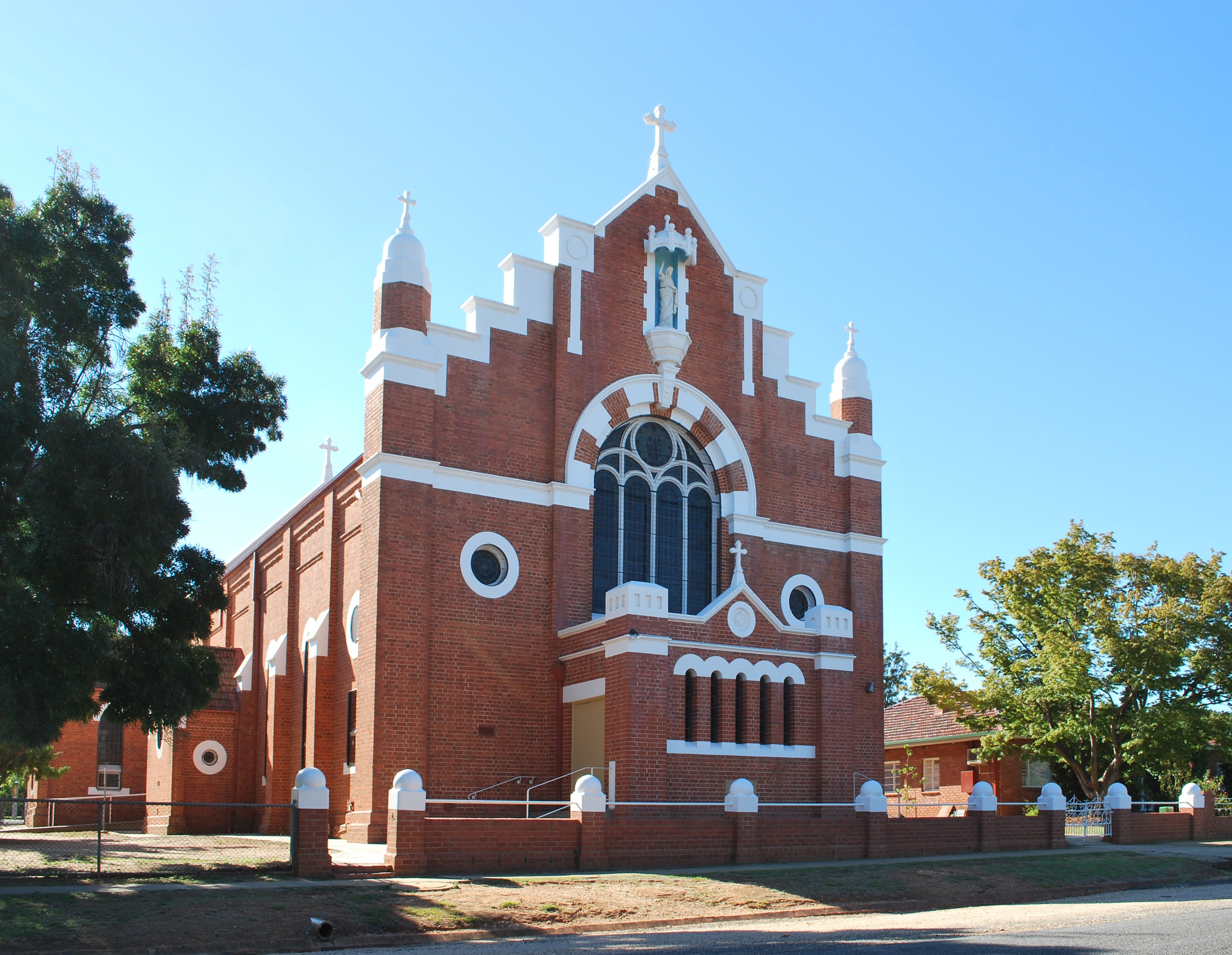
St Mary's, Corowa, 1921

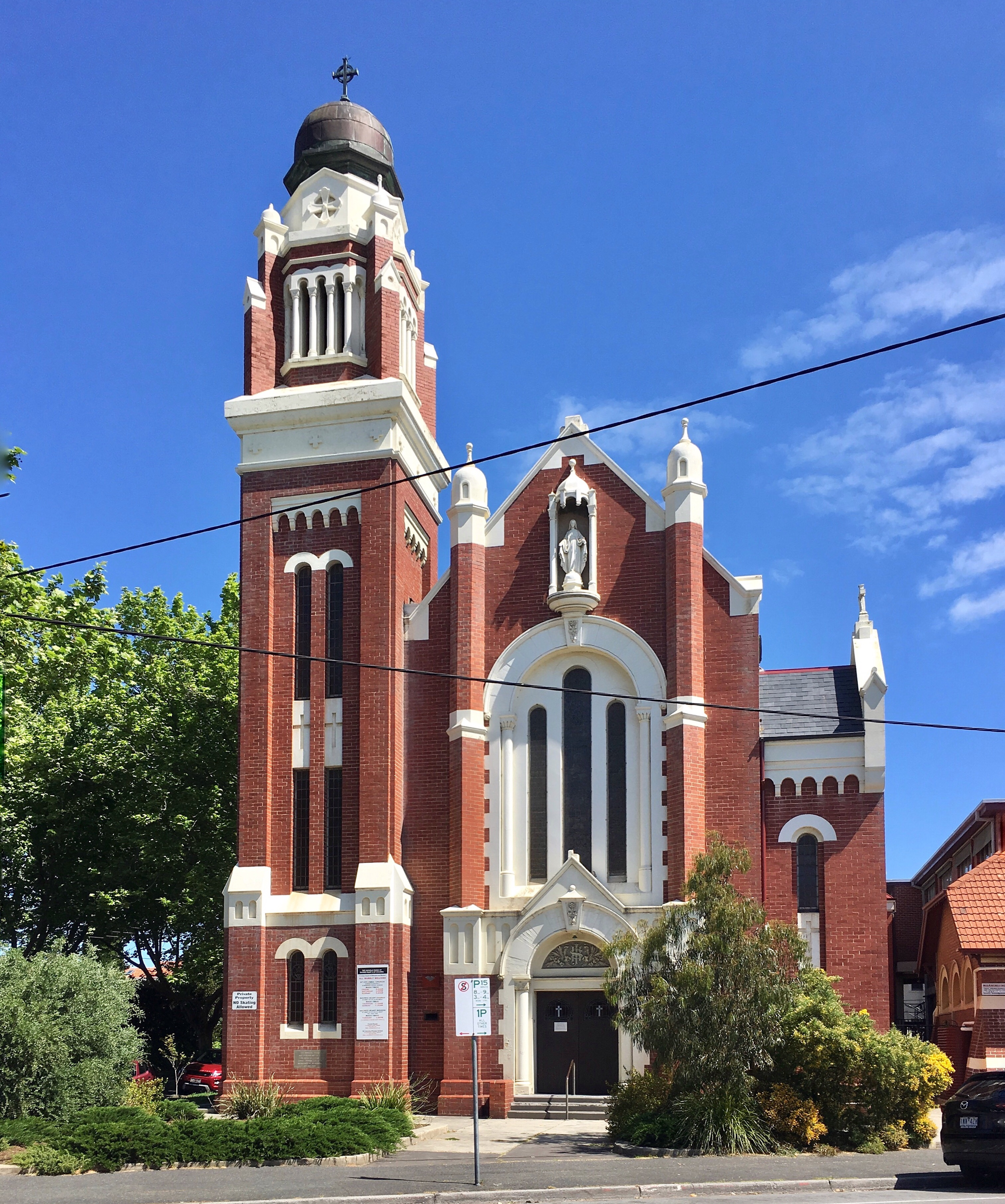
St Columba's, Elwood, 1929

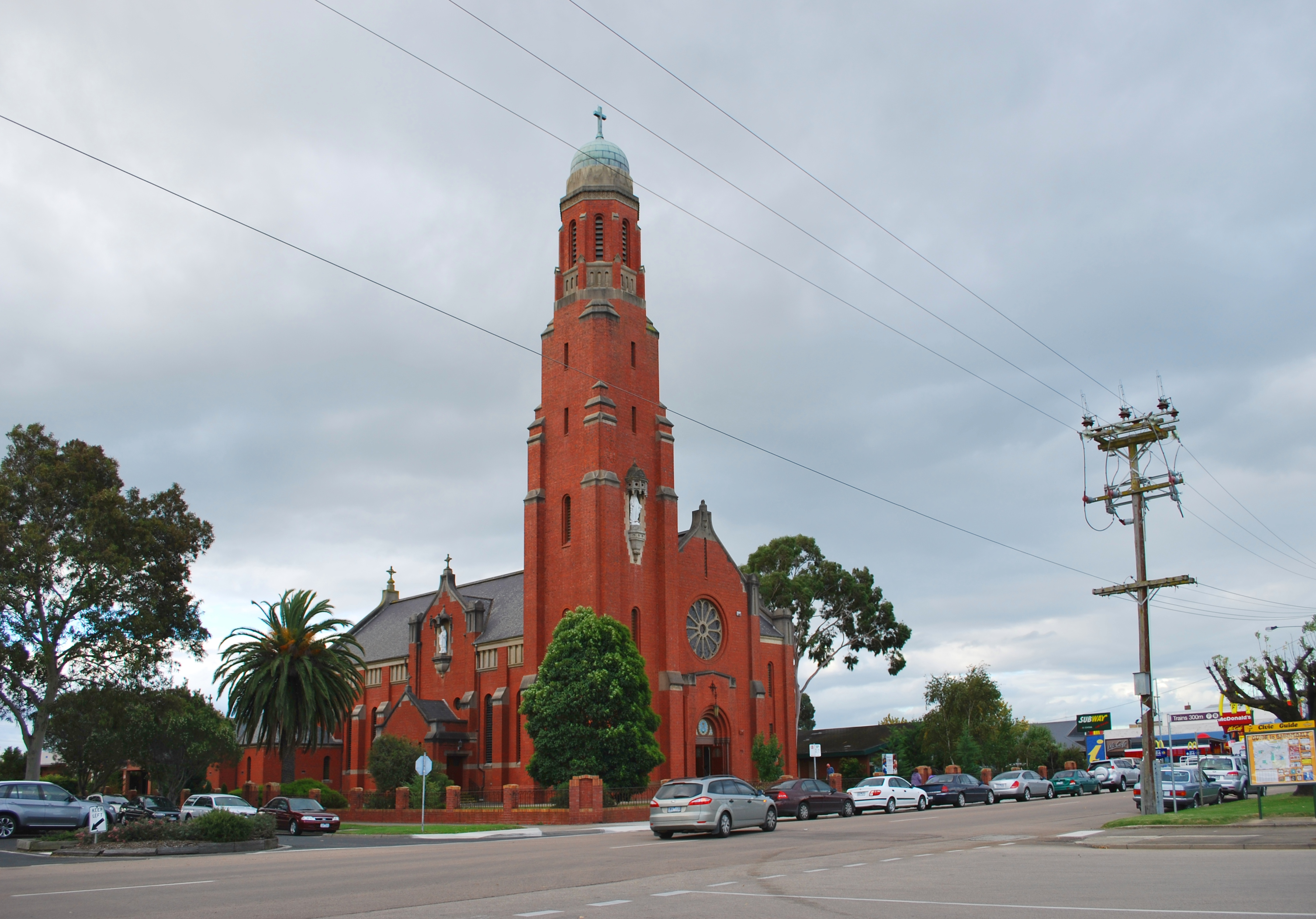
St Mary's, Bairnsdale, 1936 tower

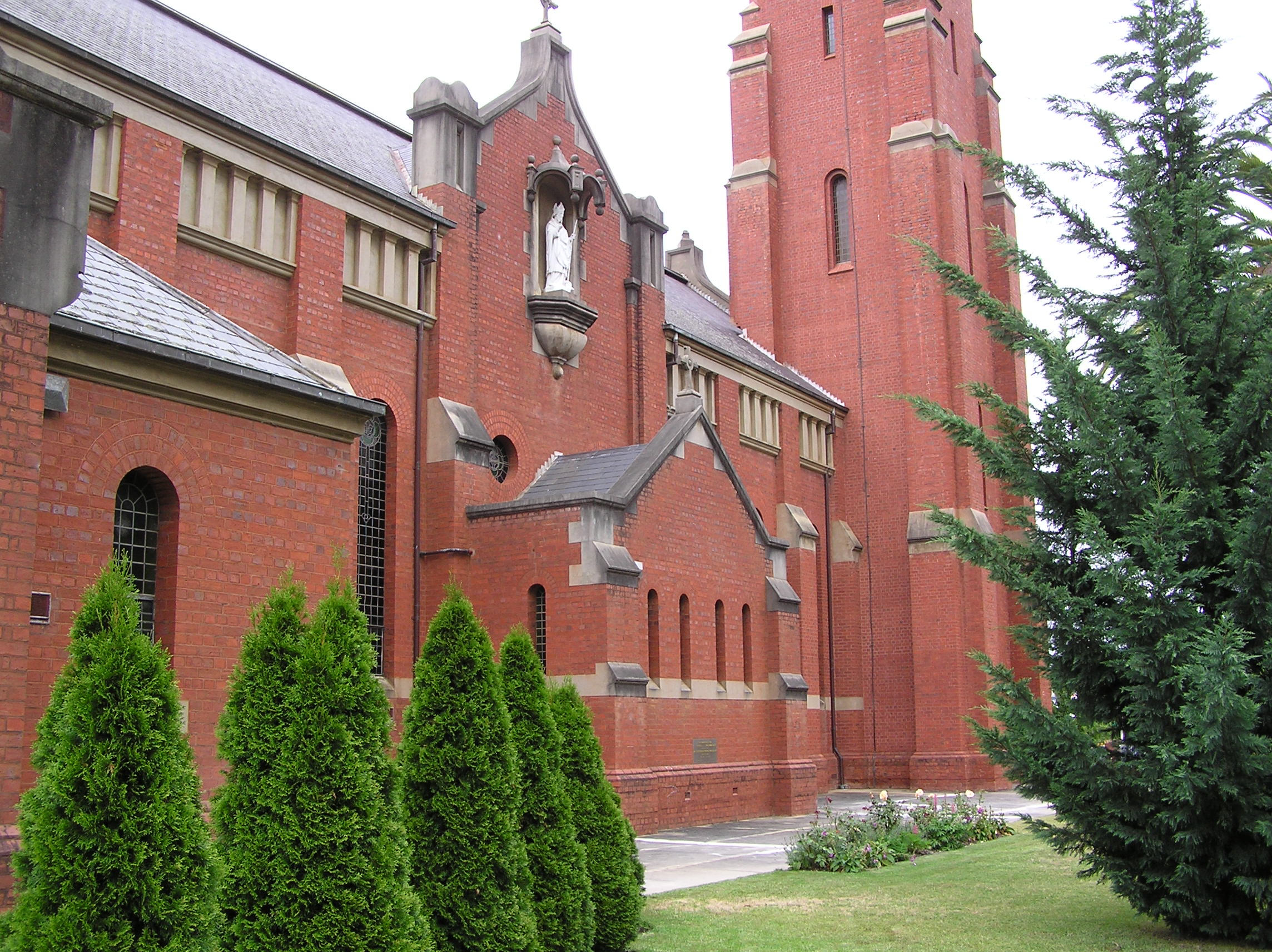
St Mary's, Bairnsdale, 1913 section
