= Our Lady of Victories Basilica, Camberwell =

Our Lady of Victories Basilica
- Our Lady of Victories Basilica
- Our Lady of Victories Basilica
- 37°50′02″S 145°03′24″E
- Address: Burke Road, Camberwell, Victoria
- Country: Australia
- Denomination: Roman Catholic
- Website: www.cbdparish.org.au/about/our-history/history-of-camberwell-parish-our-lady-of-victories/

History
- Status: Minor basilica
- Founded: 25 May 1913
- Founder: Archbishop Thomas Carr
- Dedication: Blessed Virgin Mary
- Consecrated: 6 October 1918 by Archbishop Daniel Mannix

Architecture
- Architect: Augustus Andrew Fritsch
- Architectural type: Church
- Style: Romanesque Revival
- Completed: 1918

Administration
- Archdiocese: Melbourne
- Parish: Camberwell

Clergy
- Priest: Fr Brendan Reed

Our Lady of Victories Basilica is a Roman Catholic church located in the Melbourne suburb of Camberwell. Romanesque Revival in style, it was designed by architect Augustus Andrew Fritsch and was completed in 1918. It is one of five churches in Australia with minor basilica status. Our Lady of Victories occupies an imposing site in Burke Road and, in a city where most churches of the era are built in the Gothic Revival style, has a distinctive copper clad dome completed with a golden statue of the Blessed Virgin Mary titled as "Our Lady of Victories".

Pope John Paul II raised the shrine to the status of Minor Basilica via his decree Præstans Templum Istud on 30 September 1996. The decree was signed and notarized by Vatican Secretary of State, Cardinal Angelo Sodano.

The current parish priest is Reverend Brendan Reed.

== History ==
Augustus Fritsch, the diocesan architect, drew up original plans that were modified many times, most likely due to budgetary constraints. The builder was Robert Harper. The foundation stone was laid on 25 May 1913 by the Archbishop of Melbourne, Most Rev. Thomas Carr DD, in the presence of 45,000 people. On 6 October 1918, Our Lady of Victories was opened by Archbishop the Most Rev. Daniel Mannix DD, with 80,000 people in attendance. Special trains and trams had to be provided.
