= George Featherston =

Australian rules footballer

Personal information
- Full name: George Henry Featherston
- Born: 5 June 1889; Ararat, Victoria
- Died: 1 January 1966 (aged 76); Glen Iris, Victoria
- Original team: Northcote

Playing career^{1}
Years	Club	Games (Goals)
1910	Fitzroy	5 (1)
- ^{1} Playing statistics correct to the end of 1910.

George Henry Featherston (5 June 1889 – 1 January 1966) was an Australian rules footballer who played with Fitzroy in the Victorian Football League (VFL).
