= Camberwell railway station, Melbourne =

Railway station in Camberwell, Melbourne, Victoria, Australia

Camberwell
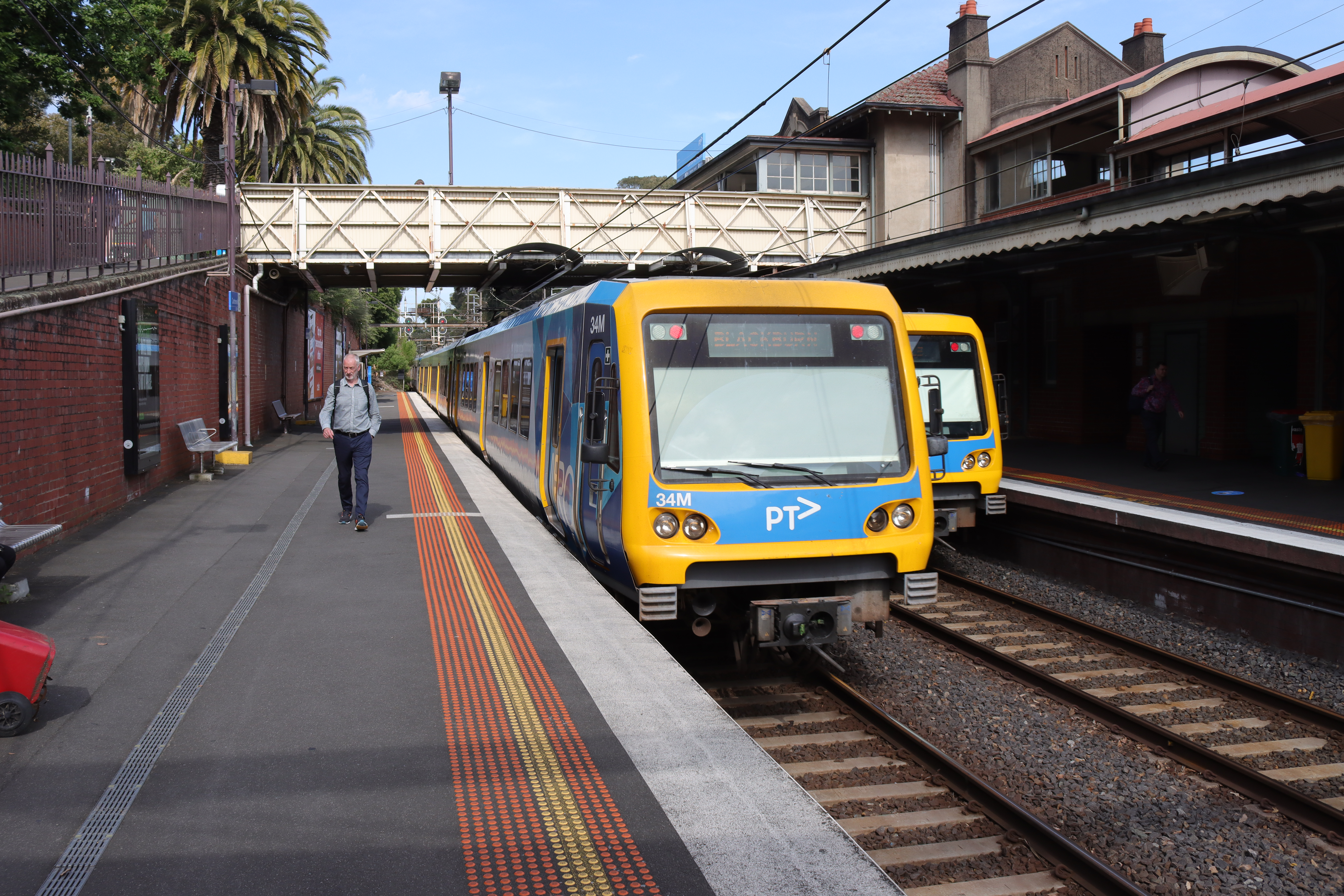
- Eastbound view from Platform 3, with two X'Trapolis trains passing each other, November 2023

General information
- Location: Burke Road, Camberwell, Victoria 3124; City of Boroondara; Australia
- Coordinates: 37°49′35″S 145°03′31″E
- System: PTV commuter rail station
- Owner: VicTrack
- Operator: Metro Trains
- Lines: Lilydale Belgrave; Alamein
- Distance: 10.21 kilometres from Southern Cross
- Platforms: 3 (1 island, 1 side)
- Tracks: 3
- Connections: Bus; Tram

Construction
- Structure type: Ground
- Parking: Yes
- Cycle facilities: Yes
- Accessible: No—steep ramp

Other information
- Status: Operational, premium station
- Station code: CAM
- Fare zone: Myki zone 1
- Website: Public Transport Victoria

History
- Opened: 3 April 1882; 144 years ago
- Rebuilt: 1919
- Electrified: December 1922 (1500 V DC overhead)

Passengers
- 2005–2006: 1,756,328
- 2006–2007: 1,935,366 ▲10.19%
- 2007–2008: 1,960,076 ▲1.27%
- 2008–2009: 2,102,035 ▲7.24%
- 2009–2010: 2,162,117 ▲2.85%
- 2010–2011: 2,267,186 ▲4.85%
- 2011–2012: 2,051,733 ▼9.5%
- 2012–2013: Not measured
- 2013–2014: 1,996,223 ▼2.7%
- 2014–2015: 1,926,135 ▼3.51%
- 2015–2016: 1,927,802 ▲0.08%
- 2016–2017: 1,927,085 ▼0.037%
- 2017–2018: 1,916,626 ▼0.54%
- 2018–2019: 1,969,600 ▲2.76%
- 2019–2020: 1,496,350 ▼24.02%
- 2020–2021: 641,150 ▼57.15%
- 2021–2022: 789,300 ▲23.1%
- 2022–2023: 1,631,400 ▲106.68%
- 2023–2024: 1,241,500 ▼23.9%
- 2024–2025: 1,260,400 ▲1.52%

Services
| Preceding station | Metro Trains | Following station |
|---|---|---|
| Terminus | Alamein line Shuttle service | Riversdale towards Alamein |
| Auburn towards Flinders Street | Alamein line Peak only | Riversdale towards Alamein |
| Auburn towards Flinders Street | Belgrave line | East Camberwell towards Belgrave or Lilydale |
| Auburn towards Flinders Street | Lilydale line | East Camberwell towards Belgrave or Lilydale |
Weekday express services
| Glenferrie towards Flinders Street | Belgrave line | Union towards Belgrave or Lilydale |
| Glenferrie towards Flinders Street | Lilydale line | Union towards Belgrave or Lilydale |
Track layout
Location

Camberwell station is a railway station operated by Metro Trains Melbourne on the Alamein, Belgrave and Lilydale lines, which are part of the Melbourne rail network. It serves the eastern suburb of Camberwell, in Melbourne, Victoria, Australia. Camberwell station is a ground level premium station, featuring three platforms, an island platform with two faces and one side platform connected by a ramp and accessible overground concourse. It opened on 3 April 1882, with the current station provided in 1919.

== History ==
Camberwell station opened on 3 April 1882, when the railway line was extended from Hawthorn. It remained the terminus of the line for a few months in that year, until the railway was extended to Lilydale. When the first section of the Outer Circle line opened in 1891, a new station was built at East Camberwell, to provide an interchange. However, the Outer Circle line quickly failed. By 1898, only the section from East Camberwell to Ashburton remained in operation (later extended to Alamein in 1948), and services for Ashburton began to depart from Camberwell.

In the late 1910s, the line from Hawthorn to Camberwell was regraded, to ease the steep gradient facing down services. Steam locomotives could not pull a fully laden train between the two stations, so peak-hour services had to be split. The locomotive would bring one set of carriages to Camberwell, then return for the other set, causing significant delays. With the regrading, the tracks at Camberwell were sunk into a cutting and the existing station was demolished. In 1919, the current Federation-style station buildings were provided, when the works were completed.

Immediately east of the station, the Alamein line diverges south, with a flyover carrying the southbound line over the Lilydale and Belgrave lines. This flyover was provided in 1959, when the line was duplicated to Riversdale. In 1963, a third line was provided between Hawthorn and Camberwell and, in 1964, the third line was extended to East Camberwell. Also occurring in November of that year, the signal box at Camberwell was the first in Victoria to have push-button signalling installed. In 1972, the centre track was extended to East Camberwell and, in 1974, the platforms were renumbered to their current arrangement.

At around 7:20am on 9 August 1975, a Tait train set rolled away from the station prior to operating an Alamein service. It occurred after the driver and guard left the train and went into the station building. It reached speeds of up to 30kph before it slowed to walking speed near Flinders Street, allowing a driver's supervisor to jump aboard and stop the train. No passengers were onboard at the time.

On 27 April 1996, Camberwell was upgraded to a premium station. In 1997, four stabling sidings were constructed on the site of the former goods yard, to replace sidings that were removed at Jolimont Yard, with the sidings brought into service on 5 January 1998. The stabling sidings had been first proposed by the Metropolitan Transit Authority (The Met) in the mid-1980s.

=== Redevelopment controversy ===
In 2001, the Victorian State Government launched a new metropolitan planning strategy, Melbourne 2030, which proposed intensification of development around public transport nodes, such as railway stations and tram routes, along with limits on such development in residential neighbourhoods. The precinct around the station was identified as one of a number of "activity centres" earmarked for redevelopment.

In March 2003, VicTrack announced plans to develop the airspace over the site, including the construction of a deck over the station platforms and adjacent stabling yard, with 3–4 levels of car park, and 3–4 storeys of commercial space. The original plans, involving the station's demolition, led to protests from the local community. They received a significant amount of media attention, with actor Geoffrey Rush and comedian Barry Humphries publicly backing the campaign, and heading a protest march up Burke Road from Camberwell Junction to the station. The comedian performed a poem about planners at the rally, and noted that the railway line was sometimes called "The Orient Express". To those supporting development of the station, the actions of the protesters were seen as an example of NIMBYism.

The Boroondara Residents Action Group worked with architects McGauran Giannini Soon to provide alternative ideas for developing the air-space over the station and yard that were more in-keeping with their view of community preferences, including a small public plaza and a new public library, with some small-scale shops.

Although the station is historic, it is not protected by any of the state's heritage listings for any architectural or cultural reasons, and failed to gain that protection when nominated to the Victorian Heritage Register by local residents groups.

In July 2009, the Victorian Civil and Administrative Tribunal approved a nine-story development on the site, provided that 14 design modifications were made within 28 days.

In October 2012, VicTrack announced that it had discontinued negotiations with the preferred developer, CSTP Pty Ltd.

== Platforms and services ==
Camberwell has one island platform with two faces and one side platform. It is serviced by Metro Trains' Alamein, Belgrave and Lilydale line services.

Camberwell platform arrangement
| Platform | Line | Destination | Via | Service Type | Notes | Source |
|---|---|---|---|---|---|---|
| 1 | Alamein line Belgrave line Lilydale line | Flinders Street | City Loop | All stations and limited express services | Alamein Line services only use this platform during weekday peaks. See City Loop for operating patterns. | |
| 1 | Alamein line | Alamein | | All stations | Late nights only. | |
| 2 | Belgrave line Lilydale line | Flinders Street | City Loop | Limited express services | Weekday mornings only. See City Loop for operating patterns. | |
| 2 | Belgrave line Lilydale line | Lilydale or Belgrave | | All stations | Evening peak only. | |
| 3 | Alamein line Belgrave line Lilydale line | Alamein, Blackburn, Ringwood, Lilydale or Belgrave | | All stations and limited express services | Services to Blackburn and Ringwood only operate on weekdays. | |

== Transport links ==
CDC Melbourne operates one bus route via Camberwell station, under contract to Public Transport Victoria:

- 612 : Box Hill station – Chadstone Shopping Centre

Kinetic Melbourne operates one bus route via Camberwell station, under contract to Public Transport Victoria:

- 285 : Doncaster Park & Ride – Camberwell Shopping Centre

Yarra Trams operates one route via Camberwell station:

- : Melbourne University – Camberwell

== Gallery ==
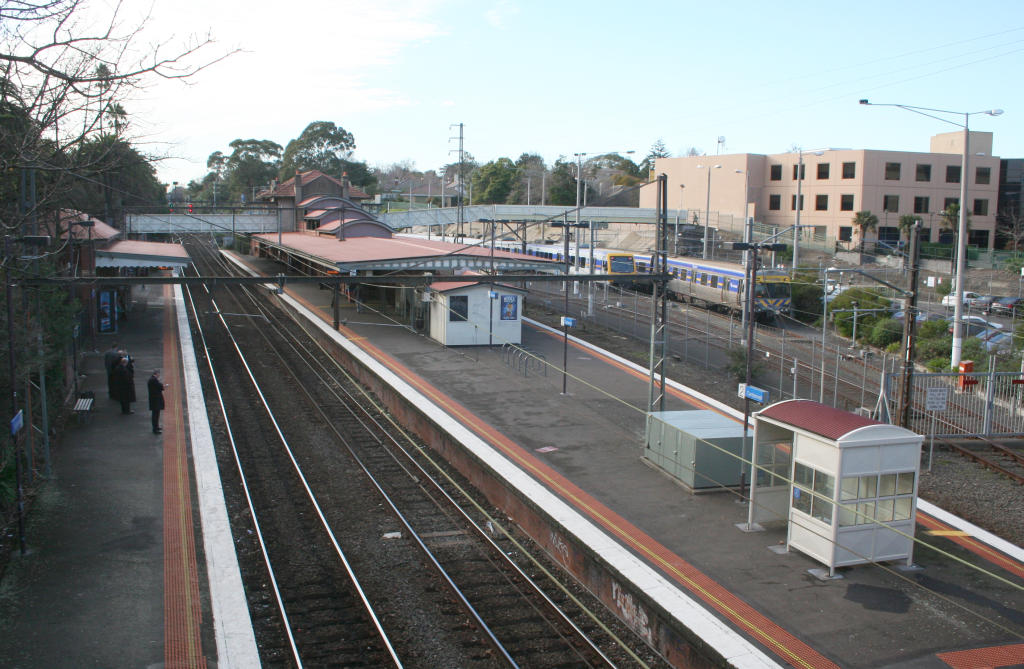
Eastbound view of the station platforms, July 2008

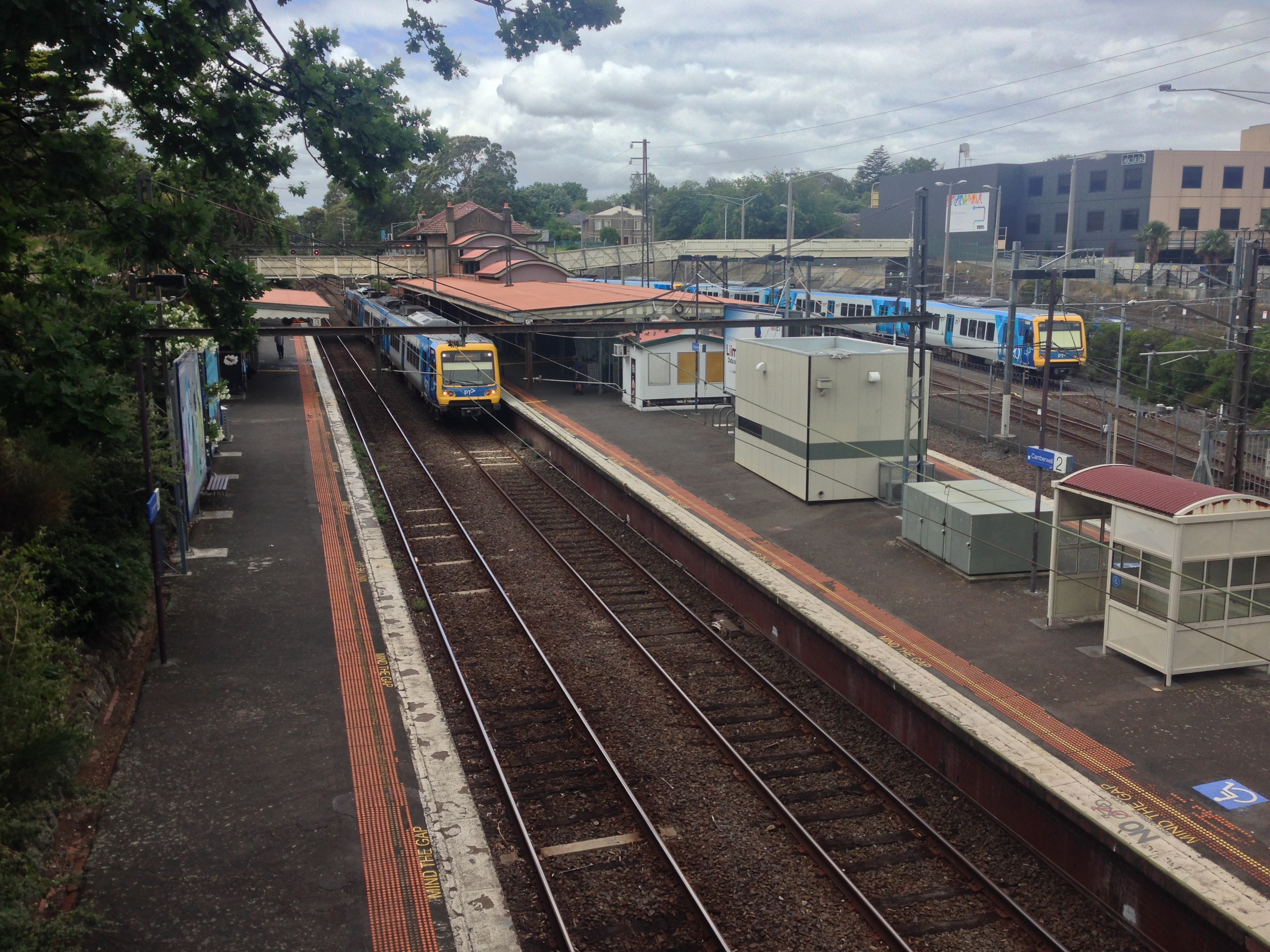
Eastbound view of the station platforms, with X'Trapolis trains in the siding and Platform 2, January 2017

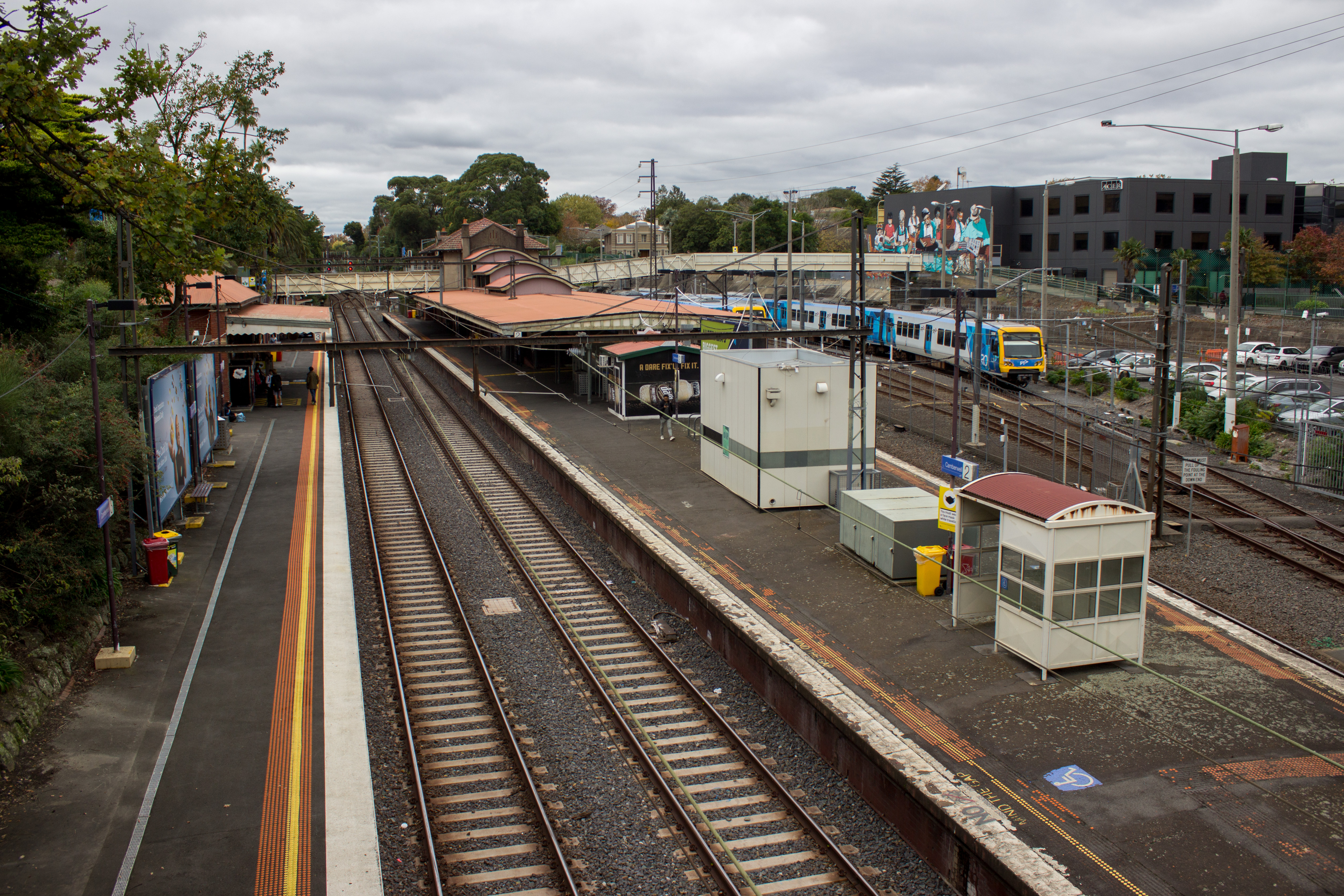
Eastbound view of the station platforms, April 2021

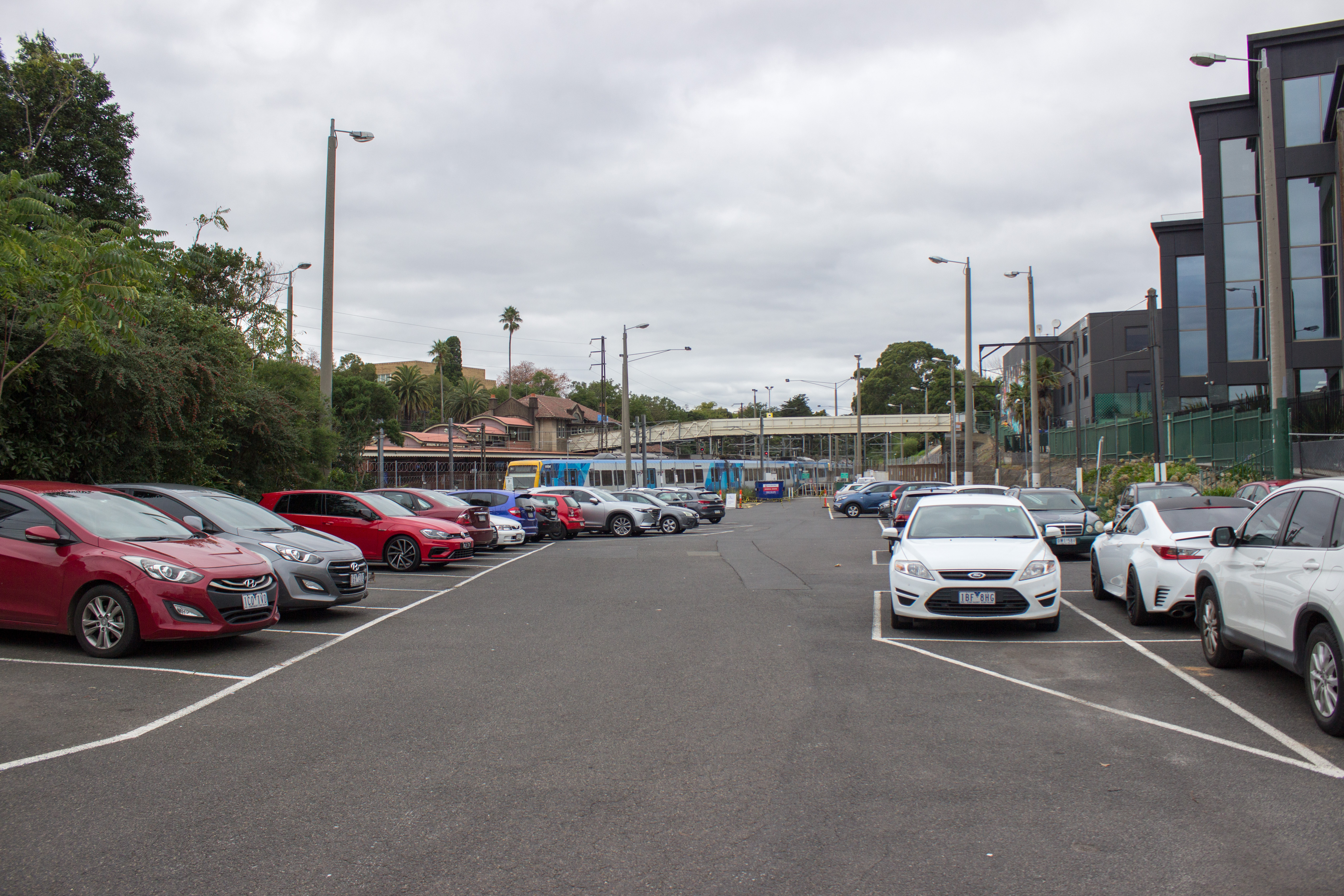
The station's car park, April 2021

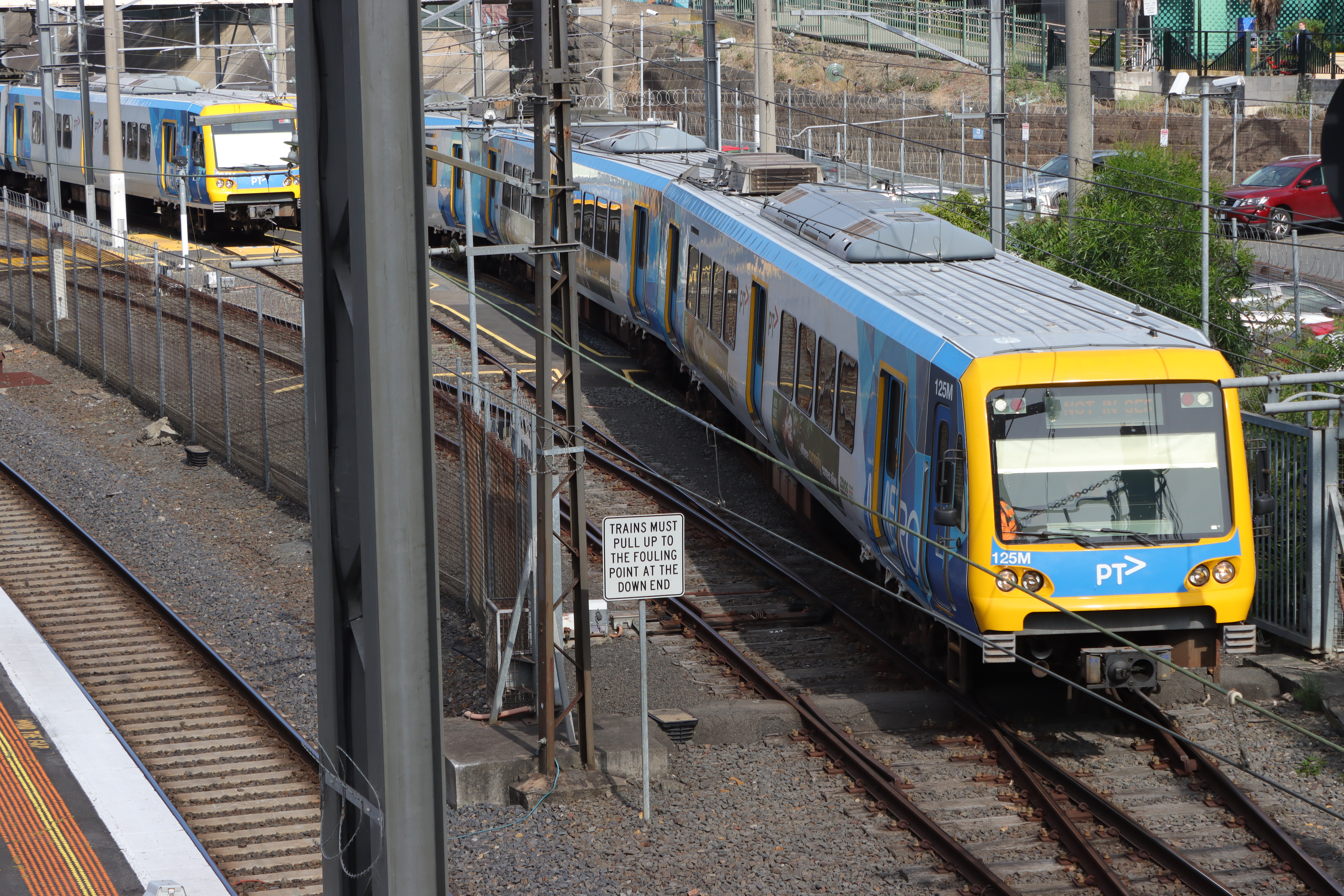
An X'Trapolis train departs the station's siding, November 2023

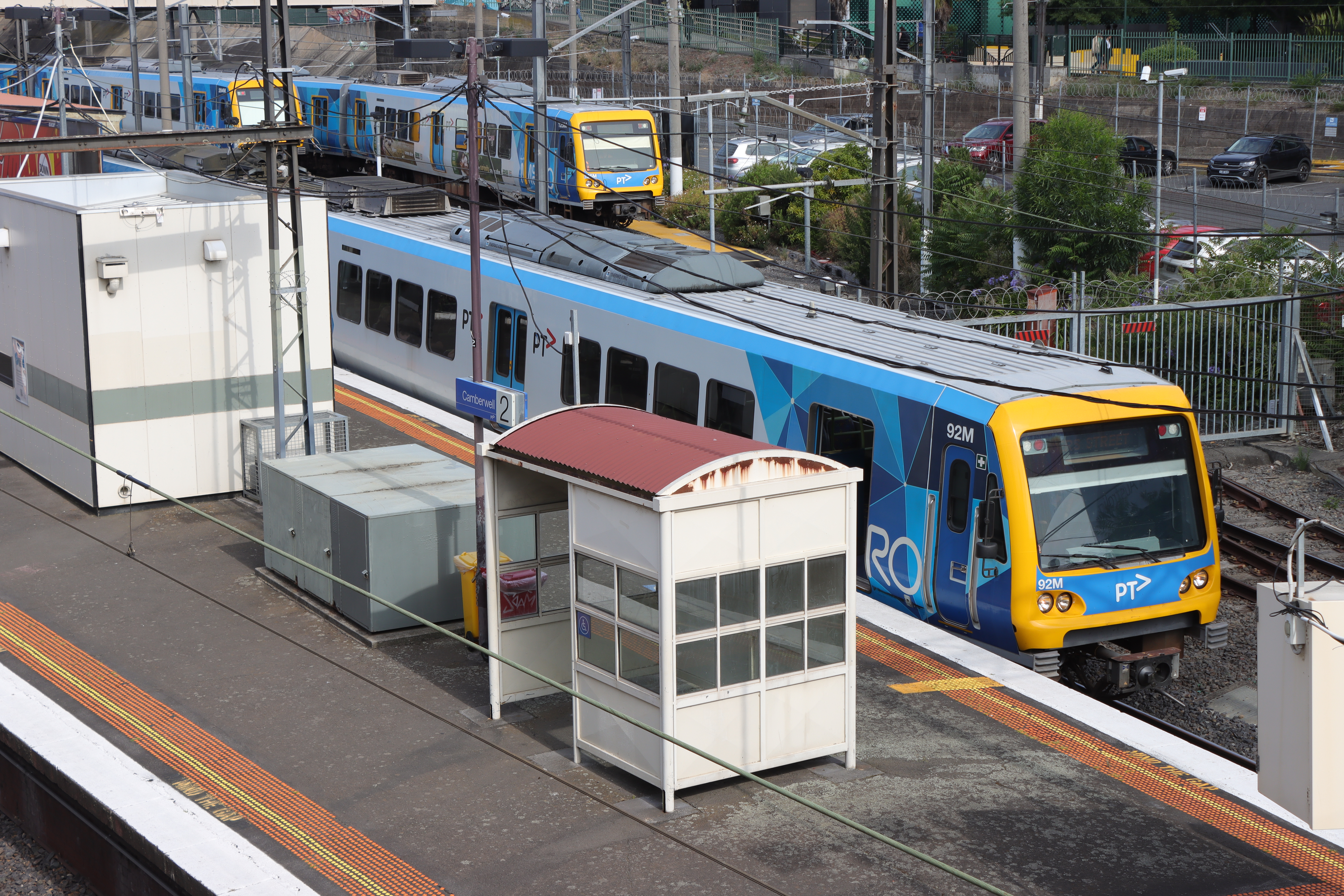
X'Trapolis train on a Flinders Street-bound service awaits to depart Platform 1, another can be seen sitting in the sidings, November 2023
