= Ernie McMaster =

Australian rules footballer

Personal information
- Full name: Ernest Peter McMaster
- Born: 7 October 1887; Hotham, Victoria
- Died: 5 December 1971 (aged 84); Glen Iris, Victoria

Playing career^{1}
Years	Club	Games (Goals)
1910	Melbourne	2 (0)
- ^{1} Playing statistics correct to the end of 1910.

Ernest Peter McMaster (7 October 1887 – 5 December 1971) was an Australian rules footballer who played with Melbourne in the Victorian Football League (VFL).

== Family ==
The son of Peter Bain McMaster (1859-1924), and Alice Amelia McMaster (1862-1940), née Furmedge, Ernest Peter McMaster was born at Hotham, Victoria on 7 October 1887.

He married Ada Beatrice Clara Dickinson (1893-1966) in 1915.

== Football ==
=== Melbourne (VFL) ===
He was cleared from Footscray to Melbourne in April 1910.

== Death ==
He died in Glen Iris, Victoria on 5 December 1971.
