= St Faith's Anglican Church =

Heritage-listed church building in Melbourne, Victoria, Australia

- St Faith's Burwood
- The church exterior, 2017

- Location of the church in Greater Metropolitan Melbourne
- St Faith's Anglican Church
- 37°51′02″S 145°05′28″E
- Location: 8 Charles Street, Glen Iris, City of Boroondara, Melbourne, Victoria
- Country: Australia
- Denomination: Anglican
- Website: stfaithsburwood.org.au

History
- Status: Parish church
- Founded: 1891 (as a parish)
- Dedication: Saint Faith

Architecture
- Functional status: Active
- Architect(s): Mockridge Stahle and Mitchell
- Architectural type: Church
- Style: Modernist
- Completed: 1957; 69 years ago

Specifications
- Materials: Bricks; steel; copper; slate; stained glass; timber; vinyl

Administration
- Province: Victoria
- Diocese: Melbourne

Clergy
- Vicar: Rev'd Heather Scott

Victorian Heritage Register
- Official name: St Faith's Anglican Church
- Type: Registered place; Registered object integral to a registered place
- Designated: 14 October 2010
- Reference no.: H2254
- Heritage overlay no.: HO571
- Category: Religion

St Faith's Anglican Church, also known as St Faith's Burwood, is an Anglican church building, located at 8 Charles Street, close to Toorak Road, in Glen Iris, (Note: Often described as located in Burwood, a neighbouring suburb.) in the City of Boroondara, in the inner suburbs of Melbourne, in Victoria, Australia.

Built in 1957 on the traditional lands of the Bunurong people, the church building was added to the Victorian Heritage Register on 14 October 2010 in recognition of its architectural, aesthetic, and historical significance; and was also added to a non-statutory list by the Victorian branch of the National Trust.

== History ==
The Anglican Diocese of Melbourne purchased the Charles Street site in 1891 and erected a timber church building the following year. The extension of the Hawthorn tram line to Burwood in 1916 increased congregation numbers, however the suburban area was not extensively developed until after World War II. Two proposals for a larger church building were submitted by established church architects Louis Williams in 1941 and Wystan Widdows in 1953. The latter design was accepted by the church, however it was subsequently rejected in favour of the contemporary and radical design by Mockridge Stahle and Mitchell. This radical design was initially rejected by the Diocese.

St Faith's Anglican Church, as designed by Mockridge Stahle and Mitchell, was built between 1957 and 1958. The design is an early modernist building of striking simplicity and innovative form, influenced by churches of post-war Europe. The church contains a collection of well executed modern fittings and furniture, and stained glass windows, designed by the architects of the church.

== Description ==
Mockridge Stahle and Mitchell, with John Mockridge as the principal designer, was a prominent architectural firm established in Melbourne in 1948, and was particularly well known for its designs for churches, schools and university buildings. At St Faith's the architects adopted a circular plan as a symbol of eternity and unity. The sanctuary end was extended in a triangular form, and a curved narthex, side chapel, and baptistery were added to the basic circular form. The resulting broad nave enabled good sight lines, while the circular form conveyed a feeling of unity and intimacy. The resultant plan has been likened to the form of a fish; an early Christian symbol.

A view of the sanctuary and altar in 2017, showing the church's circular form

Contrasting materials were used in the church which is constructed with a steel frame, walls of pale brick, and feature stonework, slate roof, and a large central pre-fabricated copper-clad spire. Interior finishes are simple with white walls and ceilings, timber acoustic battens, and a grey vinyl tiled floor. A large central lantern, with coloured glass, lights the nave (the original light diffuser has been removed), roof domes light the altar, and bold geometric stained glass windows light the side chapels. The architects also designed the church furniture including the pulpit, pews, lecterns, altar and rails, chairs, tables and candlesticks. Parishioner Esther Harris designed and produced glass and enamel panels containing apostolic symbols for the narthex doors in 1961–62. A pipe organ was installed and dedicated in 1978 and a font was placed in the centre of the church in 1991.

== See also ==
- Architecture of Melbourne
- List of Anglican churches in Melbourne
- List of places on the Victorian Heritage Register in the City of Boroondara
