= Camberwell Junction =

Traffic intersection in Melbourne, Victoria

Coordinates: 37°49′53″S 145°3′24″E

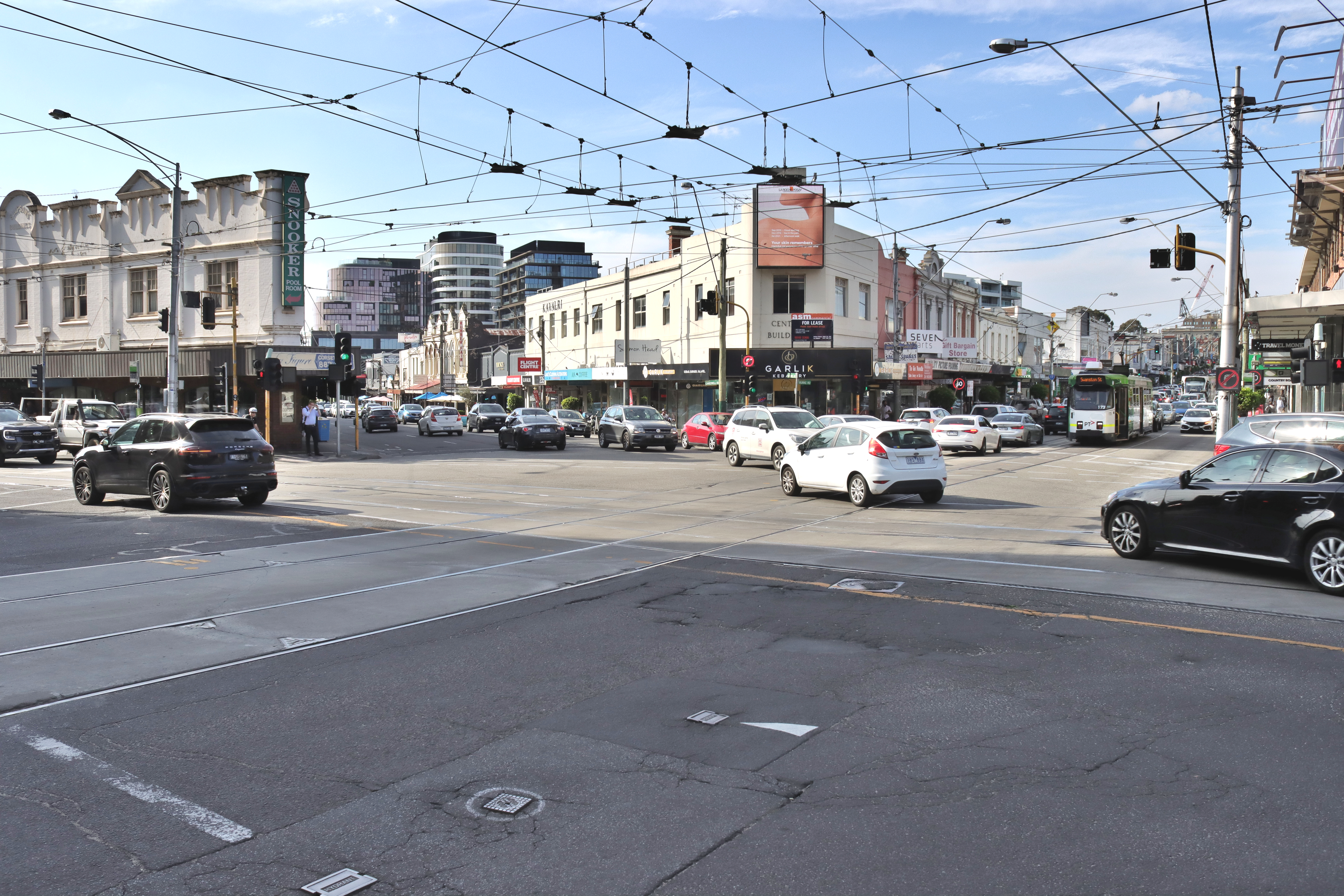
The Junction looking north-west along Burke Road and Camberwell Road.

Camberwell Junction is a major intersection in Camberwell, a suburb of Melbourne, Australia. Burke, Riversdale and Camberwell Roads meet here on six different legs. Trams that pass through the junction run on the routes 70, 72 and 75.

== Description ==
The Junction is approximately 500 metres south of Camberwell railway station on the Belgrave, Lilydale and Alamein lines.

The junction is adjacent to Camberwell shopping centre located mainly on Burke Road. The nearby Camberwell Fresh Food Market features speciality delicatessens and fruit and vegetables. The Rivoli cinemas in Riversdale Road comprise an art deco design and show mainstream and arthouse films.

== History ==
The intersection was the site of the Camberwell Hotel from which the wider suburb gets its name. Built in 1853, it became a popular rest stop for people on their journey to Gippsland during the Victorian gold rush of the 1850s and 1860s.

The junction became the focal point for retail and other activity in Camberwell. Shops, churches, and services were built at or near the intersection as the population rapidly expanded throughout the late 19th century.

In 1975 Ivan Gaal created a short film featuring Camberwell Junction, which has been uploaded to YouTube by ACMI

The speed limit along Burke Road through the Junction was reduced from 60 km/h to 40 km/h to improve safety in 2017.
