= Camberwell tram substation =

Historical electrical tram substation in Melbourne, Victoria, Australia

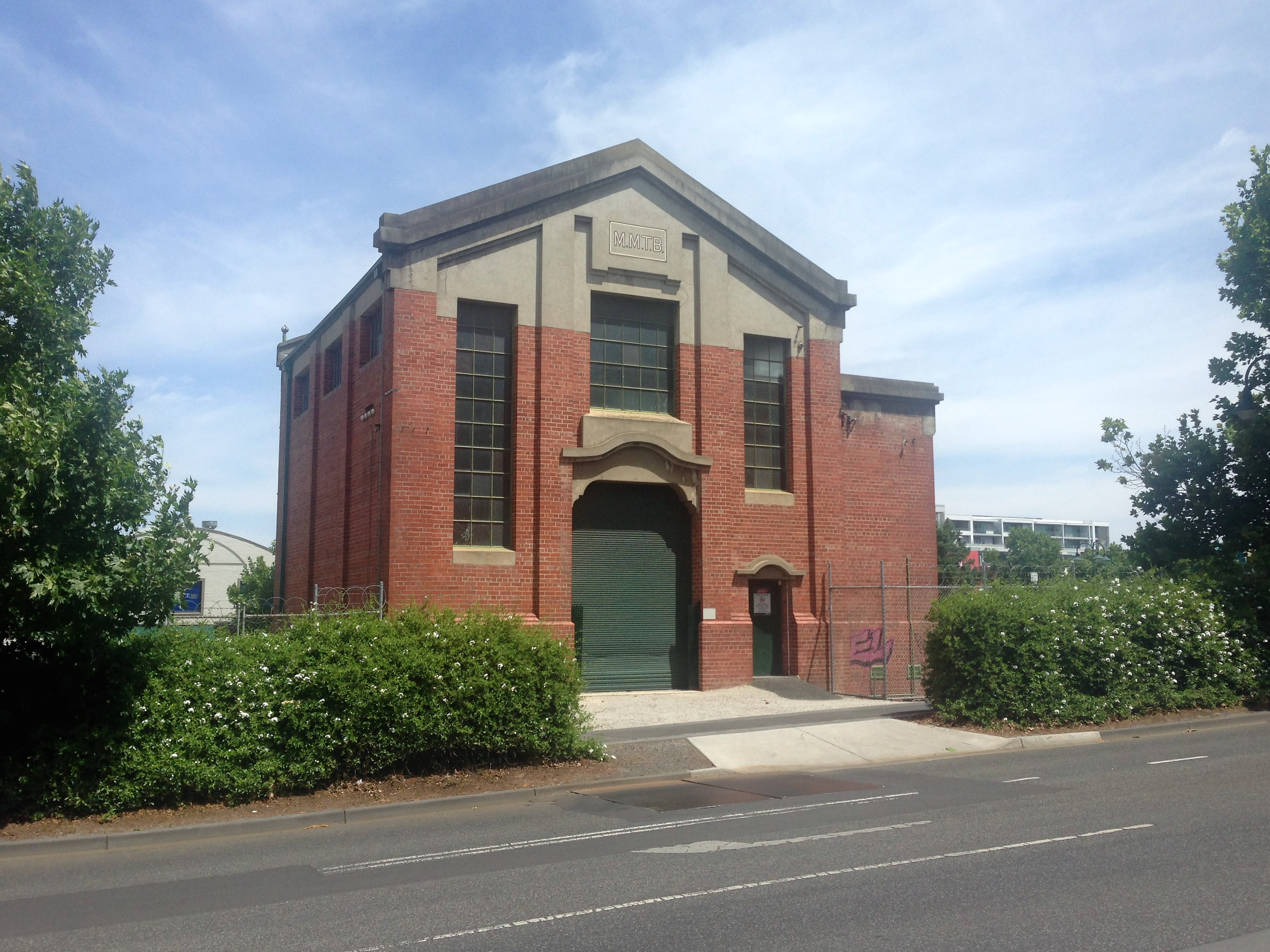
- The substation in 2018

- Location of the substation in Melbourne
- Interactive map of Camberwell tram substation
- 37°49′50″S 145°03′29″E
- Type: Electrical substation
- Location: Camberwell, Melbourne, Victoria, Australia

History
- Construction commenced: 1924
- Built: 1925; 101 years ago
- Built for: Melbourne & Metropolitan Tramways Board

Site notes
- Material: Brick
- Architect: Alan Monsborough
- Architectural style: Inter-war Stripped Classical
- Owner: Yarra Trams

Victorian Heritage Register
- Official name: Camberwell tram substation
- Type: Registered place
- Criteria: a., d.
- Designated: 12 December 2013
- Reference no.: VHR H2324
- Heritage overlay no.: HO622
- Category: Transport - Tramways

The Camberwell tram substation is an electrical substation located on Station Street in Camberwell, an inner eastern suburb of Melbourne, in Victoria, Australia. The substation was completed in 1925 and designed by Alan Monsborough in the Inter-war Stripped Classical style on behalf of the Melbourne & Metropolitan Tramways Board.

Located on the traditional lands of the Wurundjeri, the substation was added to the Victorian Heritage Register on 12 December 2013 in recognition of its historical and architectural significance. On the same date, the Victorian Government added substations at Carlton and Maribyrnong, and former substations at Ascot Vale, Brunswick, Elsternwick, and South Yarra to the same heritage register.

== Description ==
In 1919, the Melbourne & Metropolitan Tramways Board (M&MTB) was established to electrify and extend Melbourne's existing cable and electric tram routes. Electrical substations were built to take electricity from the State Electricity Commission energy grid system to power the newly-established electric tram lines.

Between 1925 and 1940 the M&MTB progressively electrified the old steam-powered cable tram routes, built new depots and substations, extended the existing tram lines and added new routes. Alan Monsborough, the M&MTB's architect, was responsible for the design of tramway buildings during the formative years of the electric tramway system, and the design of the Camberwell tram substation is attributed to him. The substation, one of four 1920s substations which survive relatively intact, was built to house the equipment to power the trams through Camberwell to Burwood.

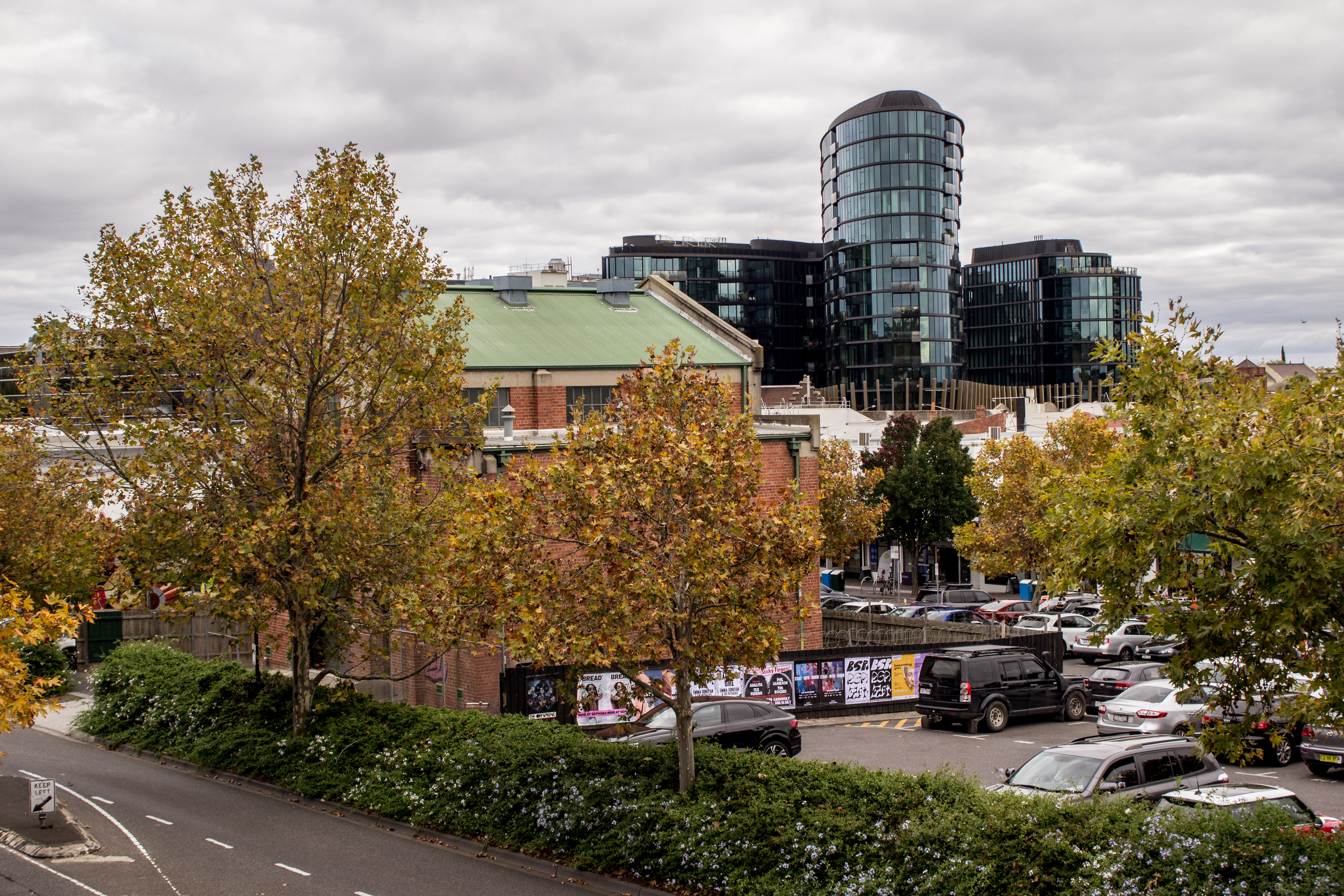
Obscured view of the substation, behind trees at left

The Camberwell tram substation is a symmetrical Inter-war Stripped Classical style single-storey brick building with a gabled corrugated iron roof. It has a rendered parapet with 'MMTB' inscribed above the front entrance, and rendered dressings around the openings. Along the north side there is a lower brick skillion in a similar style but without openings. The substation has a large central front entrance for the movement of electrical plant, tall steel-framed windows and clerestory lighting on the north side. The original electrical equipment has been replaced. The building retains its original roller door on the front entrance and the overhead pulley once used to move heavy equipment within the building.

== See also ==
- Architecture of Melbourne
- Timeline of trams in Melbourne
- List of places on the Victorian Heritage Register in the City of Boroondara
