= Camberwell, Victoria =

Camberwell
- Suburb
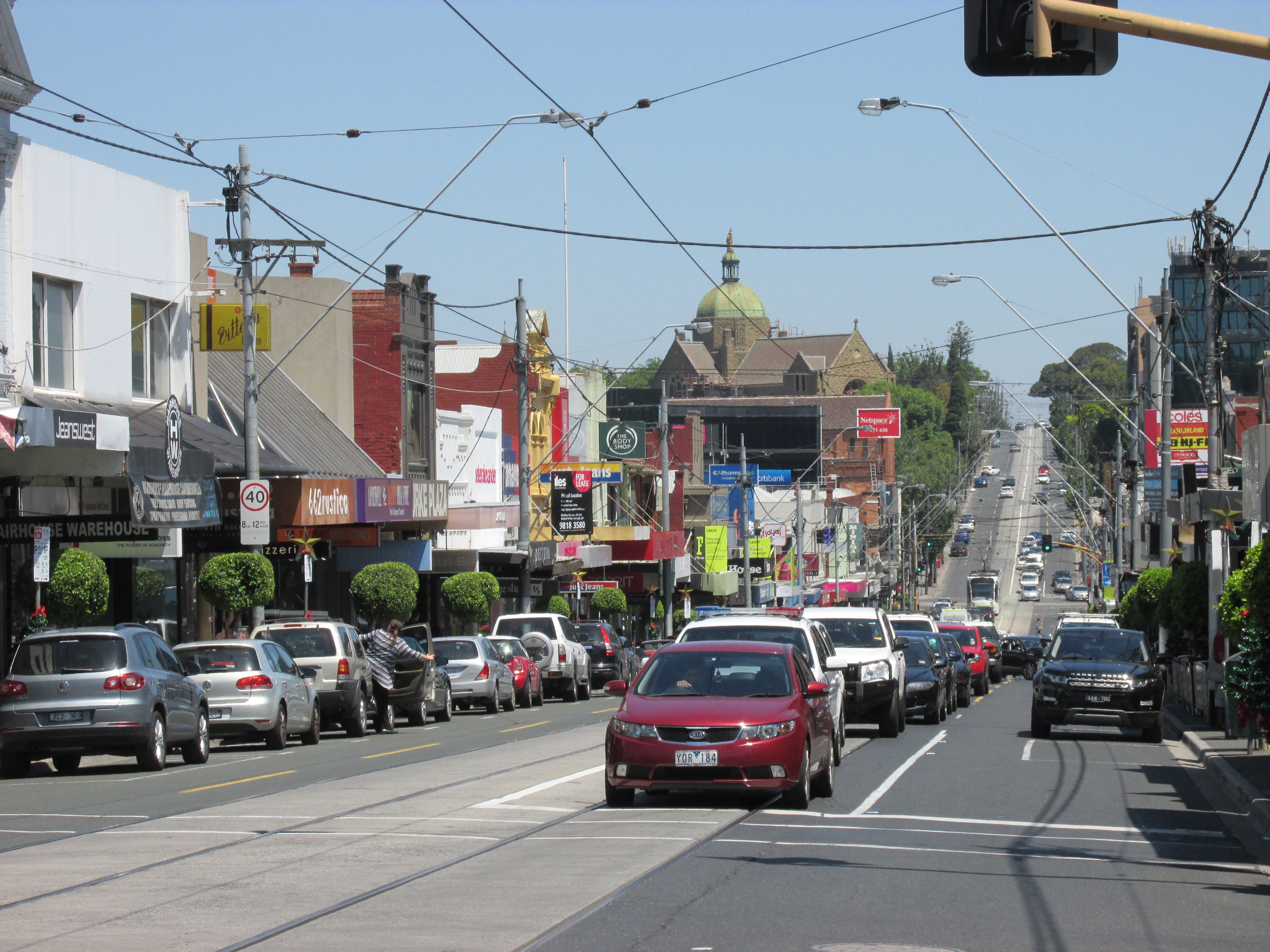
- Burke Road, Camberwell in November 2014

- Interactive map of Camberwell
- Coordinates: 37.835°S 145.071°E
- Country: Australia
- State: Victoria
- City: Melbourne
- LGA: City of Boroondara
- Location: 10 km (6.2 mi) from Melbourne

Government
  - State electorates: Ashwood; Hawthorn; Kew
  - Federal divisions: Chisholm; Kooyong

Area
  - Total: 5.8 km^{2} (2.2 sq mi)
- Elevation: 57 m (187 ft)

Population
  - Total: 21,965 (SAL 2021)
- Postcode: 3124
Suburbs around Camberwell
Hawthorn East	Canterbury	Surrey Hills
Hawthorn East	Camberwell	Burwood
Glen Iris	Glen Iris	Burwood

Camberwell (/ˈkæmbərwɛl/ KAM-bər-wel) is an inner suburb of Melbourne, Victoria, Australia, 10 km east of Melbourne's Central Business District, located within the City of Boroondara local government area. Camberwell recorded a population of 21,965 at the 2021 census.

The western, southern and eastern boundaries of the suburb generally follow Burke Road, Toorak Road and Warrigal Road respectively. The northern boundary generally follows Riversdale Road, except for an area in the northwest where it extends upwards to Canterbury Road, incorporating Camberwell, East Camberwell and Riversdale railway stations. Known for grand, historic residences and tranquil, leafy streets, Camberwell is commonly regarded as one of Melbourne's most prestigious and exclusive suburbs. Camberwell has been Melbourne's geographical centre of population since the 2020s.

== History ==
=== Pre-European settlement ===
Camberwell is located on the traditional lands of the Wurundjeri people of the Kulin nation who have inhabited the area from an estimated 31,000 to 40,000 years ago.

=== European settlement ===
Camberwell received its name from an early settler who was reminded of the way three roads intersected in the south London district of Camberwell. This intersection is now known as Camberwell Junction. The Camberwell Post Office opened on 12 October 1864. The development that followed was a product of the expansion of Melbourne's suburban rail network in the 1880s; after the Camberwell station opened on 3 April 1882, when the railway line was extended from Hawthorn.

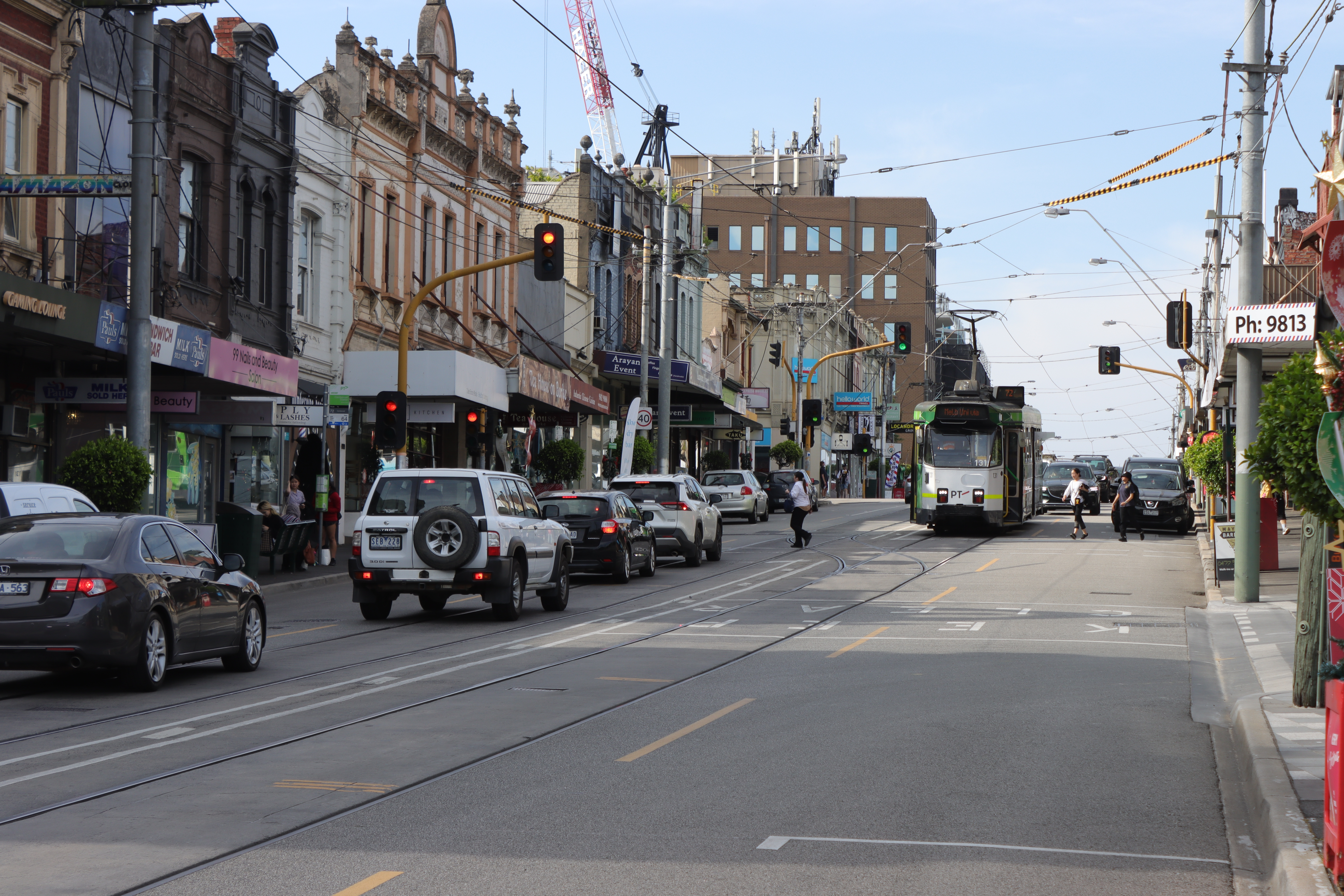
Burke Road in Camberwell, looking north

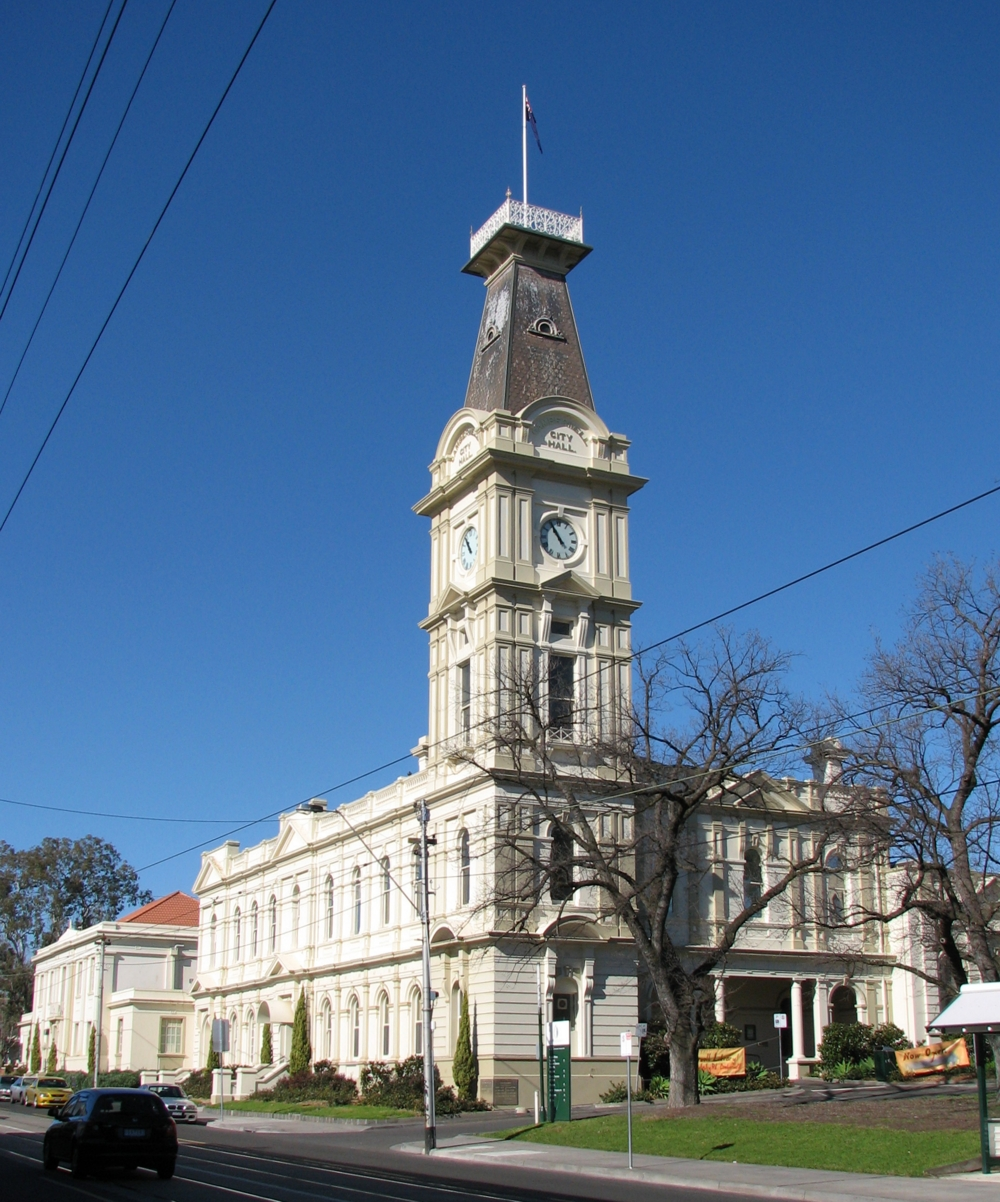
Former Camberwell Town Hall building, from Camberwell Road

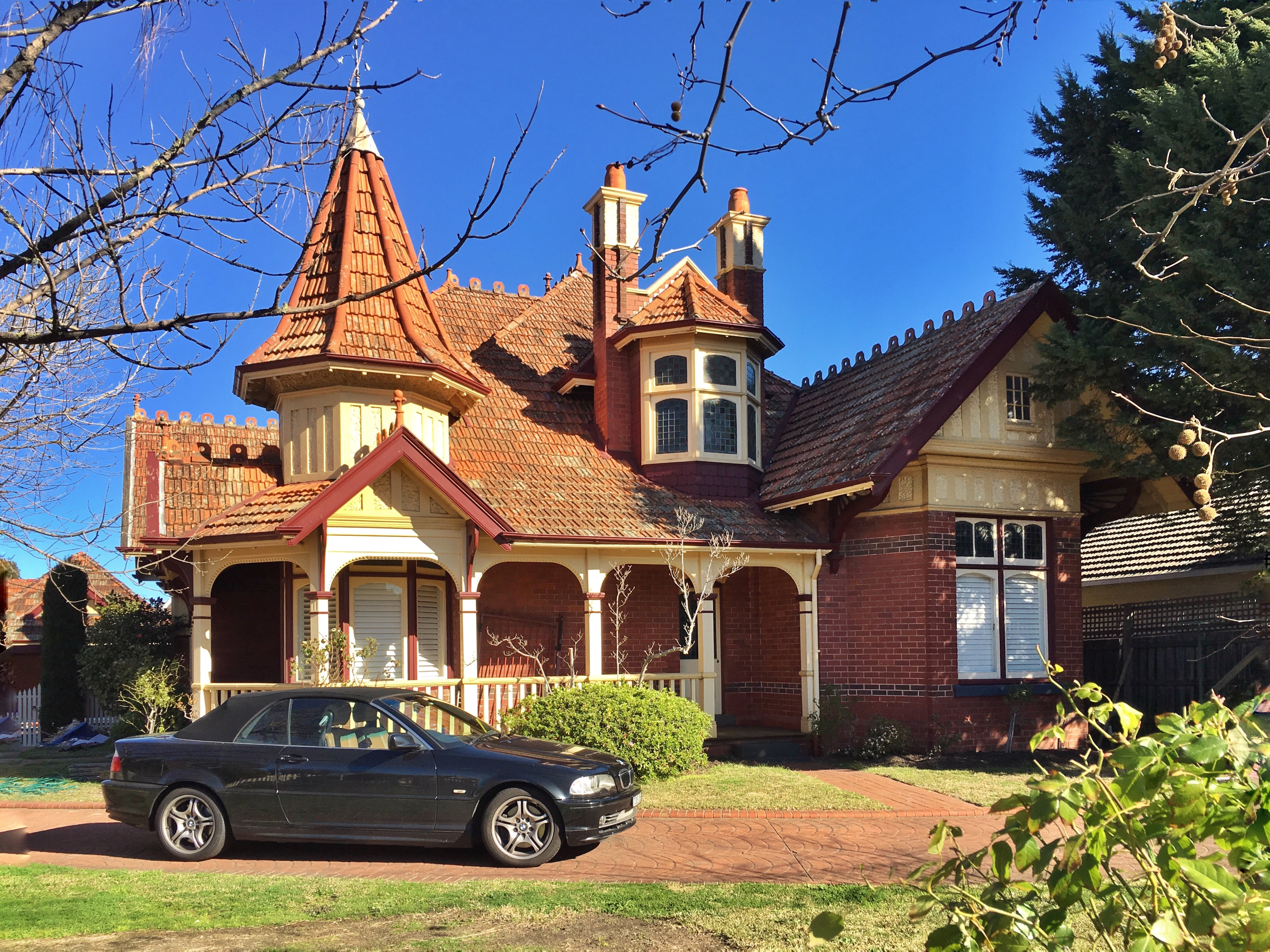
Travancore was designed by Ussher & Kemp in the Queen Anne Revival style

The Prospect Hill Road Precinct, located adjacent to the railway station, is one of the oldest developed parts in the suburb. The original subdivision was relatively generous blocks, which were quickly filled with fine Victorian and Edwardian houses. Due to its hilly topography, many east–west streets in the Prospect Hill area have a view of Melbourne's central business district. The suburb's main commercial centre developed along Burke Road from the railway station to Camberwell Junction, 500 metres (1,600 ft) to the south. Several tram routes converge on this point.

Though the area was originally agricultural, Camberwell is now one of the most well-established of Melbourne's affluent suburbs. It is part of the City of Boroondara, the local government area with the highest socio-economic advantage index in Australia. There is almost no industrial land in Camberwell, and commercial uses are concentrated near the Burke Road precinct, which has long been one of the busiest in suburban Melbourne.

==== Urban redevelopment plans ====
In the 1980s, a planned major development to the east of the Burke Road shopping strip met substantial opposition from local residents. National Mutual Life Association proposed a 24,000-square-metre (260,000 sq ft) three-storey enclosed shopping centre, which drew substantial objections. The Podgor Group, a property developer, purchased the site from National Mutual in 1987 and submitted revised plans to Camberwell Council. When the Council approved Podgor's plans in 1988, 400 residents stormed the meeting. At elections later that year, anti-development candidates won control of the Council and although the developer subsequently proposed a lesser development, in 1990 the reconstituted Council rescinded its decision to approve the shopping centre. Podgor sued the Council and was awarded $25 million in damages.

In 1999, Opposition similar to that facing the Podgor redevelopment was mounted regarding plans to develop Camberwell railway station to incorporate retail and office development. High-profile present and past residents Geoffrey Rush and Barry Humphries supported the protest action, and the development was finally approved in 2009. However, the development never eventuated after VicTrack, the owner of the land, announced that it would not proceed with construction.

=== Heritage listings ===
The following places in Camberwell are listed on the Victorian Heritage Register:

- Robin Boyd House I, 664–666 Riversdale Road
- Broughton Hall, 2 Berwick Street
- Camberwell Courthouse and Police Station, 311–317 Camberwell Road
- Camberwell tram substation, 30 Station Street
- Second Church of Christ, Scientist (former), now the Wat Phra Dhammakaya Melbourne, 41 Cookson Street
- St Mark's Anglican Church, 1 Canterbury Road

== Geography ==
=== Urban structure ===
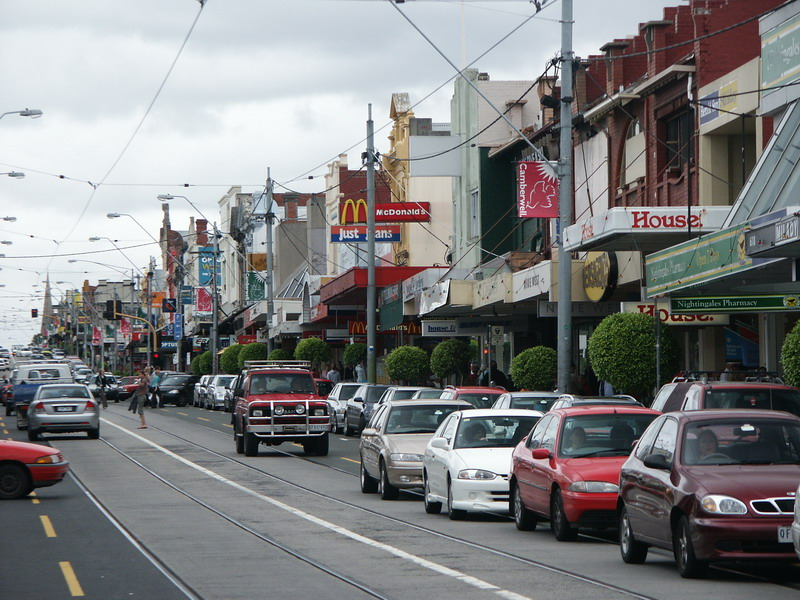
Busy Burke Road, Camberwell (looking north from Camberwell Junction) in May 2006

Camberwell Junction is designated as one of 26 Principal Activity Centres in the Melbourne 2030 Metropolitan Strategy.

=== Demographics ===
According to the 2021 census of Population, there were 21,965 people in Camberwell.

- 65.8% of people were born in Australia. The next most common countries of birth were China 7.0%, England 3.3%, India 2.0%, New Zealand 2.0% and Malaysia 1.7%.
- 71.1% of people spoke only English at home. Other languages spoken at home included Mandarin 9.3%, Greek 2.4%, Cantonese 2.1%, Italian 1.5% and French 1.3%.
- The most common responses for religion were No Religion 43.8%, Catholic 20.5% and Anglican 8.9%.

=== Localities ===
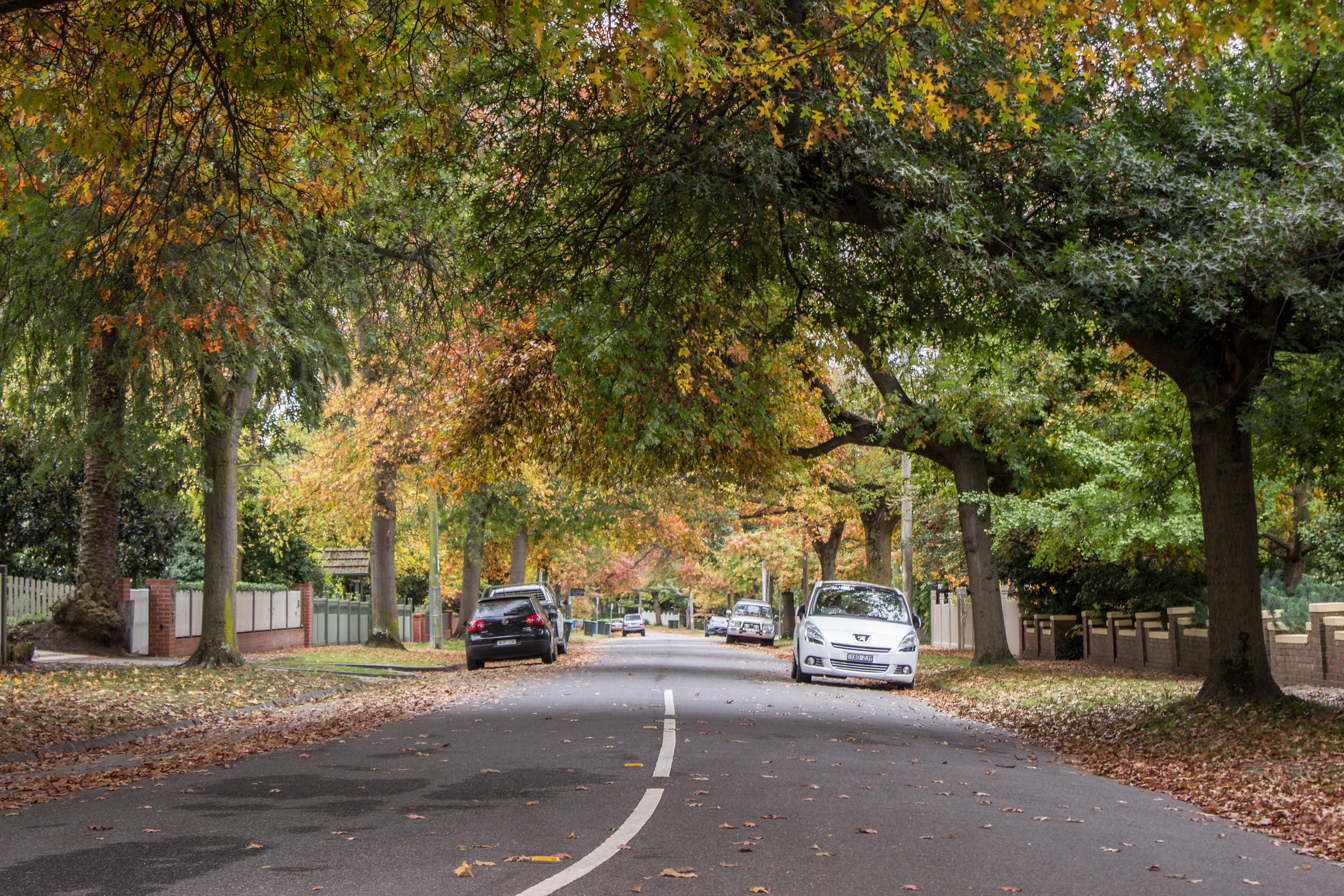
Many streets have trees planted in the 1920s and 30s by Camberwell City Council that create shade and tree canopy.

East Camberwell, Hartwell, Riversdale and Willison are four officially named neighbourhoods, within the general area of the railway stations of the same name.

=== Landmarks ===
The historic Rivoli Cinemas sit just west of Camberwell Junction, in the adjacent suburb of Hawthorn East.

A feature of Camberwell is the Burke Road shopping strip, which stretches north, approximately 600 m from Camberwell Junction, where three tram routes converge.

The southern areas of the Prospect Hill Precinct (from the south side of Prospect Hill Road to Riversdale Road) were developed for the Riversdale Estate, Kasouka Estate and Gladstone Park Estates from the late nineteenth century. The Kasouka Estate was created in 1891 and included Kasouka Road, Trafalgar, Prospect Hill and Riversdale Roads. Kasouka Road has a high level of visual cohesion and is dominated by Victorian and Edwardian period villas.

The suburb has two markets. The Camberwell Fresh Food Market has been operating since 1929 and includes a range of indoor fresh food stalls. The Camberwell Sunday Market is held in the carpark nearby and has been operated by the Rotary Club of Balwyn since 1976 and comprises 370 stallholders, selling secondhand clothing, books, furniture, and crafts.

=== Parks and gardens ===
Camberwell has several parks, reserves and playgrounds, most notably, Frog Hollow Reserve, Fordham Gardens, Cooper Reserve, Bowen Gardens, Lynden Park, Highfield Park, Riversdale Park and Willison Park.

== Economy ==
Camberwell is home to a number of notable head offices, including Pacific Brands and Bakers Delight.

== Transport ==
=== Public transport ===
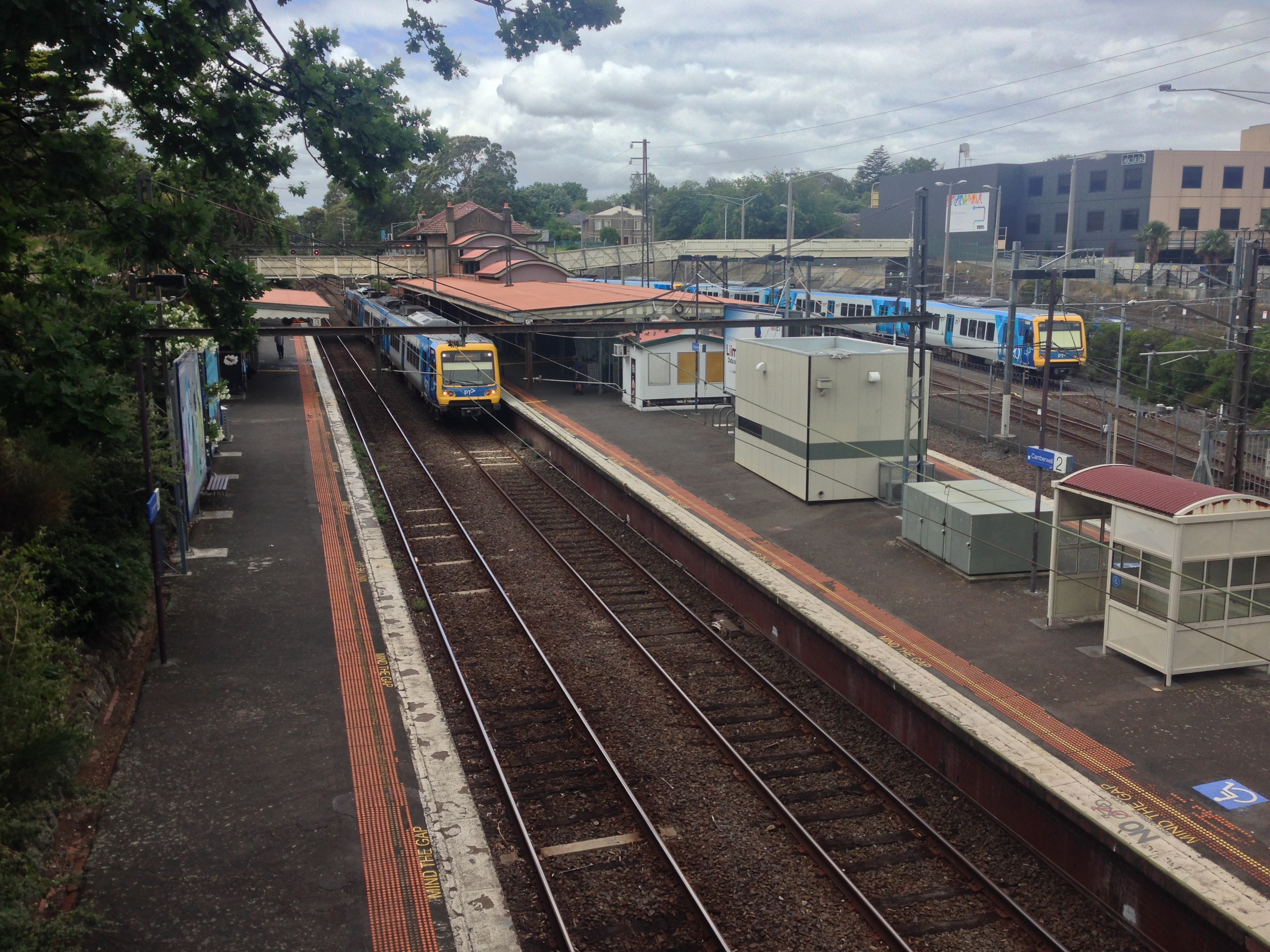
Camberwell railway station in 2017

Camberwell is well-serviced by public transport with three rail lines, three tram routes and three bus services operating throughout the suburb.

==== Bus ====
- 285: Doncaster Park & Ride – Camberwell via North Balwyn
- 612: Box Hill Central – Chadstone Shopping Centre

==== Tram ====
- 70: Waterfront City Docklands - Wattle Park
- 72: Melbourne University – Camberwell
- 75: Docklands Stadium – Vermont South

==== Train ====
Camberwell is serviced by Camberwell, East Camberwell, Riversdale, Willison and Hartwell railway stations, located on the following lines:

- Alamein
- Belgrave
- Lilydale

== Education ==
=== Schools ===
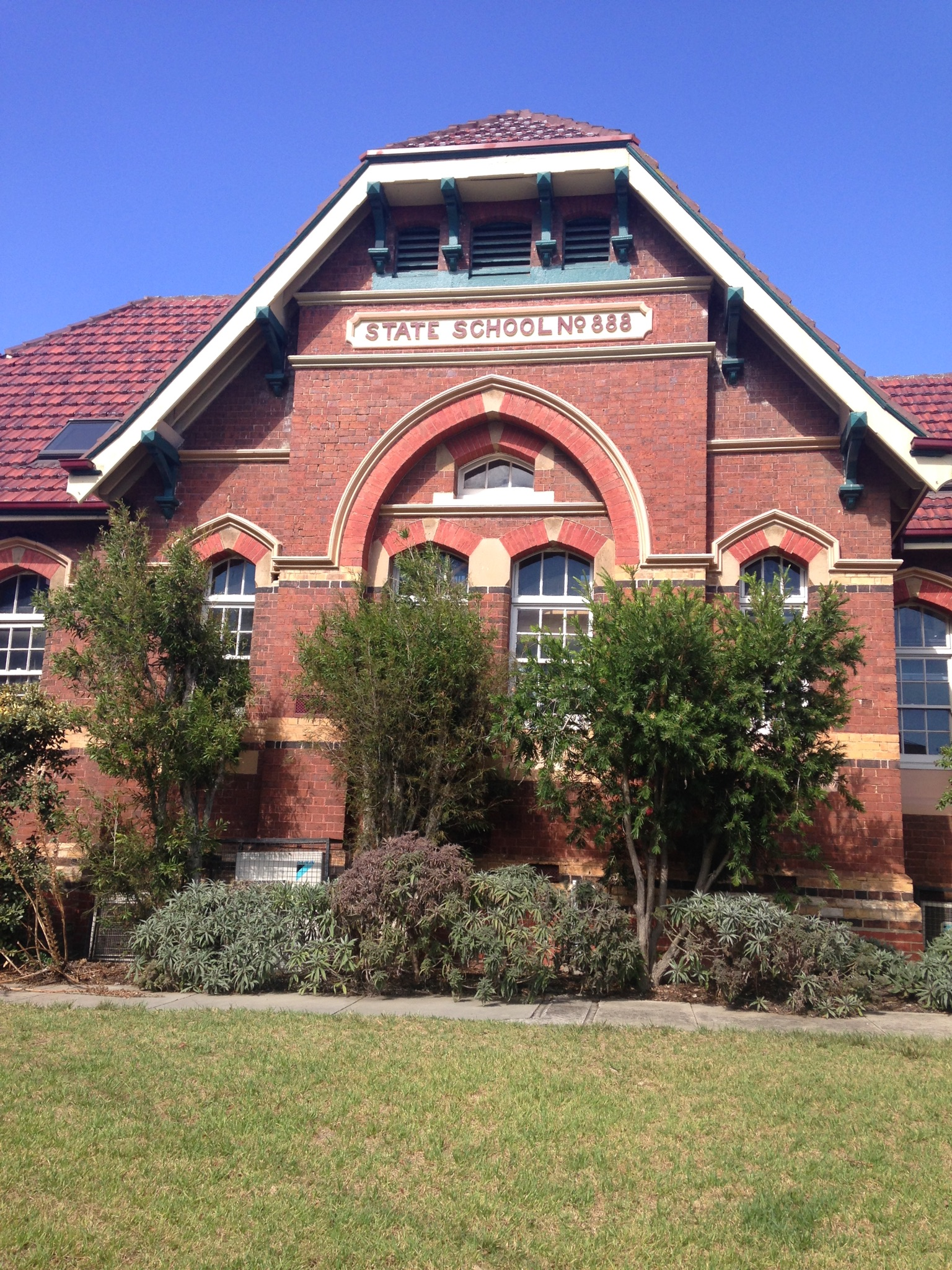
Camberwell Primary School

- Camberwell Primary School
- Siena College
- St Dominic's Catholic Primary School
- Hartwell Primary School

Some schools such as Camberwell Girls Grammar School, Camberwell Grammar School and Camberwell High School bear the "Camberwell" name but are actually located in neighbouring Canterbury. Camberwell and Canterbury were once suburbs which made up the local government area City of Camberwell, which was dissolved in 1994 and amalgamated with two other LGAs to form a new LGA, the City of Boroondara.

== Places of worship ==
Our Lady of Victories Basilica

Ten churches were established in the area; Camberwell South Anglican Church, St Dunstan's Anglican, St John's Anglican, St Mark's Anglican, Our Lady of Victories Basilica, St Dominic's Catholic Church Salvation Army, Methodist (now Uniting), Presbyterian, Greek Orthodox, Church of Christ and Baptist. Camberwell Baptist Church was constituted in 1891 and has met on the same site in Riversdale Road, Hawthorn East, near Camberwell Junction, since its inception.

== Sports ==
Camberwell Football Club participated in the Victorian Football Association from 1926 to 1991. The suburb has a junior Australian rules football team called the Camberwell Sharks, who compete in the Yarra Junior Football League.

Since October 1996 the Camberwell Magpies Cricket Club has played in the Victorian Premier Cricket competition.

== Notable residents ==
- Marie Collier, soprano
- Peter Costello, Former Federal Treasurer and former MP for Higgins
- Sir Rupert Hamer, Victorian Premier 1971–1981
- Alf Howard, scientist and explorer
- Barry Humphries, Australian comedian, best known for his alter ego Dame Edna Everage; Humphries grew up in 36 Christowel Street, in the Golf Links Estate
- Norman Lacy, Victorian Arts and Educational Services Minister 1979–1982
- Nellie Constance Martyn, businesswoman
- Claire Maxwell, academic sociologist
- Kylie Minogue and Dannii Minogue, Australian singers, were raised in nearby Surrey Hills and attended Camberwell High School.
- Keith Murdoch, newspaper journalist, writer, editor
- Tom Mitchell, AFL player
- Adam Plack, didgeridoo player
- Geoffrey Rush, Australian actor
- Dom Tyson, AFL footballer for the Melbourne Football Club

== See also ==
- City of Camberwell – Camberwell was previously within this former local government area.
