= Camberwell Fresh Food Market =

Fresh-food marketplace in Camberwell, Victoria, Australia

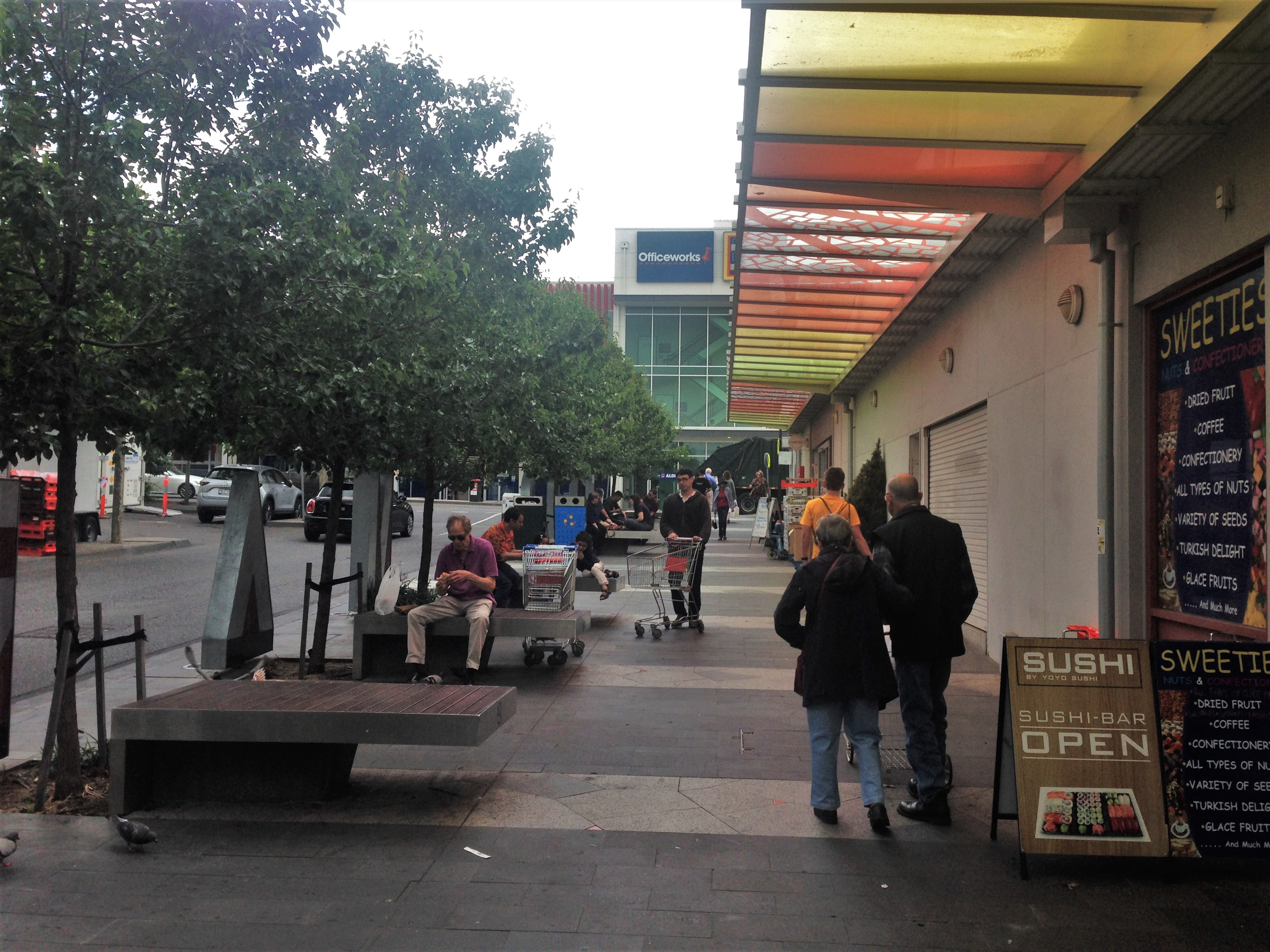
- Outside the main entrance of the Market in 2018.
- Interactive map of the Camberwell Fresh Food Market area

General information
- Status: Open
- Type: Public food market
- Location: Camberwell, Victoria, Australia
- Coordinates: 37.8311°S 145.0577°E
- Construction started: 1928
- Completed: 25 March 1929
- Renovated: 2002, 2023

The Camberwell Fresh Food Market is a public marketplace located in the suburb of Camberwell in Melbourne, Australia.

== History ==
The Market opened in 1929 on the site of a former horse carriage factory owned by future City of Camberwell councillor Harry Rooks and his business partner Harry Scott. Fittingly, it was Rooks who officially opened the market while a councillor. It attracted complaints from local residents about traffic congestion soon after it opened.

In 1953 it was sold by Camberwell Council to a private company, Ireland's Camberwell Market. Soon after it was sold, Ireland's increased rents by 25% and proposed demolishing the market to build a new two-storey shopping mall with 110 shops, supermarket and carpark.

Its popularity continued well into the 1960s until the first supermarket opened nearby. This drew trade away from the market which began to fall into a state of disrepair. By 1982 it was not well-patronised and considered to be old-fashioned and run down, to the point that Camberwell Council considered plans to demolish the market and redevelop the site.

=== 1992 fire ===
At around 5:30pm on 20 April 1992, a large fire was sparked by a fault with refrigeration equipment. It burned down most of the market and destroyed shops and their stock, including a well-known cockatoo called 'Eric' who was reported to be over 50 years of age.

The extensive damage made the market unusable and forced businesses to trade from temporary premises until September 1992. All premises were re-leased following repairs at an increased rent.

=== Refurbishments ===
The building was refurbished by in 2002 with additional and upgraded facilities.

In 2022 and 2023, further works by Boroondara Council added a new central dining area, public toilets and outdoor seating. This also included changes to opening hours, with some traders now opening on Sundays when the entire market was previously closed

== Description ==
The Market is open on Mondays, Wednesdays, Thursdays, Fridays and Saturdays between 7am and 5pm. Some traders also open on Sundays between 10am and 3pm.

There are over 20 individual stalls. These mainly comprise fresh food shops including butchers, a greengrocer and a florist. The northern section includes some cooked food outlets with indoor and outdoor seating.
