= Glen Iris, Victoria =

Glen Iris
- Suburb
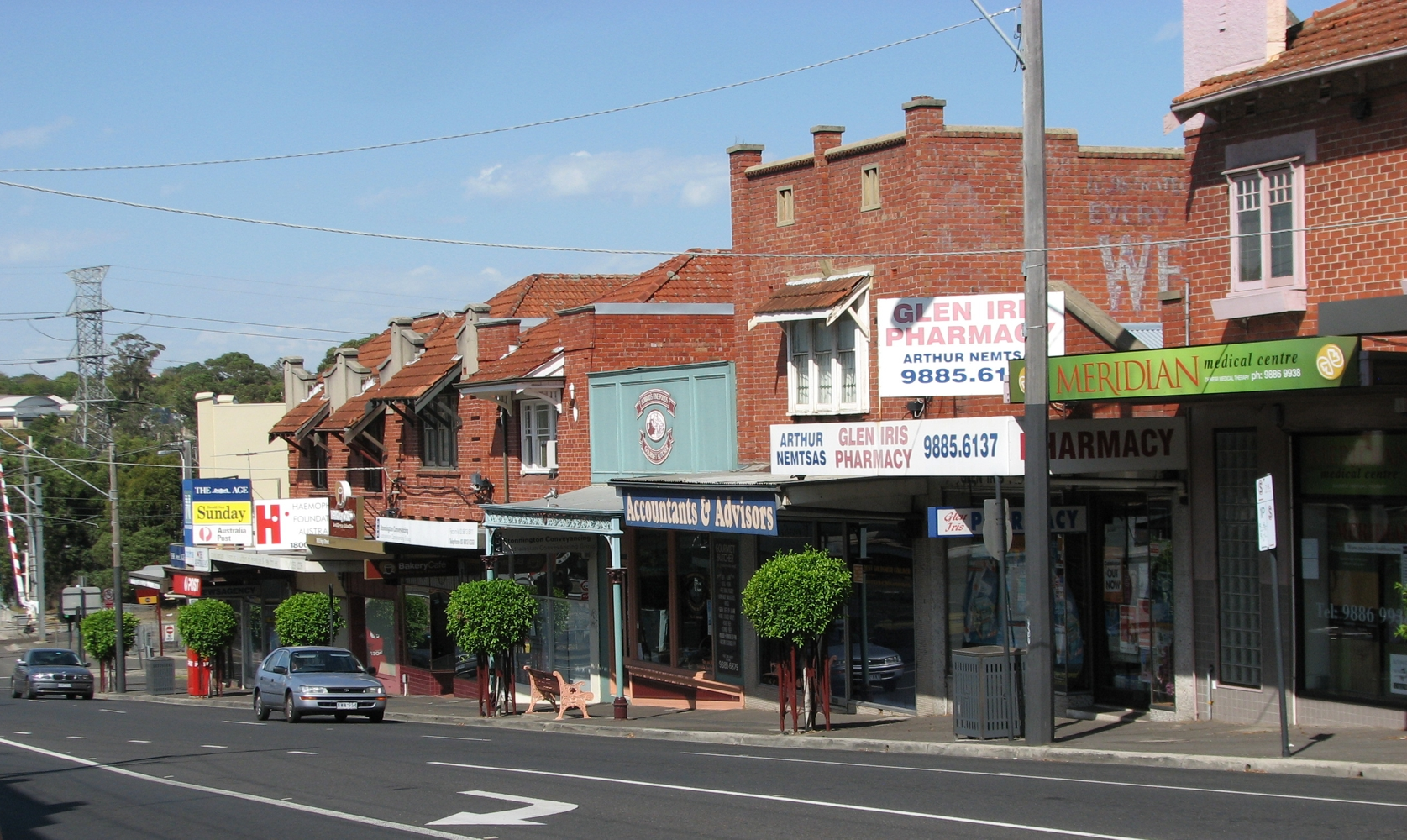
- High Street

- Interactive map of Glen Iris
- Coordinates: 37.856°S 145.059°E
- Country: Australia
- State: Victoria
- City: Melbourne
- LGAs: City of Boroondara; City of Stonnington
- Location: 10 km (6.2 mi) from Melbourne

Government
  - State electorates: Ashwood; Hawthorn; Malvern
  - Federal division: Chisholm

Area
  - Total: 7.1 km^{2} (2.7 sq mi)
- Elevation: 30 m (98 ft)

Population
  - Total: 26,131 (SAL 2021)
- Postcode: 3146
Suburbs around Glen Iris
Hawthorn East	Camberwell	Camberwell
Malvern	Glen Iris	Burwood
Malvern	Malvern East	Ashburton

Glen Iris is a suburb in Melbourne, Victoria, Australia, 10 kilometres (6.2 mi) south-east of Melbourne's Central Business District, located within the Cities of Boroondara and Stonnington local government areas. Glen Iris recorded a population of 26,131 at the 2021 census.

Glen Iris had been Melbourne's geographical centre of population from the 1990s to the 2020s, with urban sprawl seeing Melbourne's centre of population shifting to Camberwell in the 2020s.

== History ==
Captain Thomas Henderson, RN, arrived in Melbourne on a ship called Iris in 1850. He acquired a property bounded by Gardiners Creek, High Street and a line extending Summerhill Road to Gardiners Creek. The property was advertised for sale as Glen Iris, in 1852. Robert Kent, a subsequent owner of the Glen Iris homestead, suggested a Mechanics' Institute be established, but it was never completed. A Wesleyan church was established in 1865 and in 1871 land was granted for an adjacent school (now Glen Iris Primary School). By the 1880s reference was made to the Township of Glen Iris. Glen Iris Post Office opened on 28 August 1890. A Glen Iris Upper Post Office was open from 1947 until 1994.

=== Heritage listing ===
The exterior of St Faith's Anglican Church, in 2017

The following place in Glen Iris is listed on the Victorian Heritage Register:

- St Faith's Anglican Church, 8 Charles Street

== Places of interest ==
A number of government and independent schools are located in Glen Iris, including Camberwell South Primary School, Glen Iris Primary School, St Cecilia's Primary School, St Roch's Catholic Primary School, Sacré Cœur School, Korowa Anglican Girls' School and Caulfield Grammar School Malvern campus (the latter three are all situated within a few blocks of one another, south of High Street and east of Burke Road).

Recreational and sporting facilities include the Harold Holt Memorial Swimming Centre, Glen Iris Cricket Club, a BMX track at Hill'n'Dale Park, Burwood District Bowls Club and a number of reserves and ovals, including Eric Raven Reserve, Hartwell Sports Ground, Ferndale Park and T.H. King Oval. The Glen Iris wetlands were established by the former City of Malvern in 1989. The Harold Holt Swim Centre was built in memory of former Prime Minister Harold Holt, whose electoral seat of Higgins included Glen Iris. This pool has led to the amusement of many locals and visitors as they realise a pool was built to commemorate a man who was presumed drowned after going missing, at Cheviot Beach, Portsea in 1967.

Glen Iris Road Uniting Church incorporates part of the original 1865 Wesleyan Church building.

The division between the Boroondara and Stonnington municipalities follows the course of Gardiners Creek, which is a tributary of the Yarra River. A tributary of Gardiners Creek, running north through the suburb, Back Creek, has largely been turned into a drain. Also roughly following the course of Gardiners Creek is the Monash Freeway, and the Glen Waverley train line.

== Transport ==
Two train stations on the Glen Waverley railway line, Gardiner and Glen Iris, are within the suburb. Passing through the eastern part of Glen Iris is the Alamein line, with Burwood Station also within the boundaries of the suburb (Glen Iris did not originally cover this far east, and this station and its surrounds were originally in the suburb of Burwood). Residents are also served by the numbers 5, 6, 72 and 75 tram routes. Melbourne bus routes also service the area.

== Notable residents ==
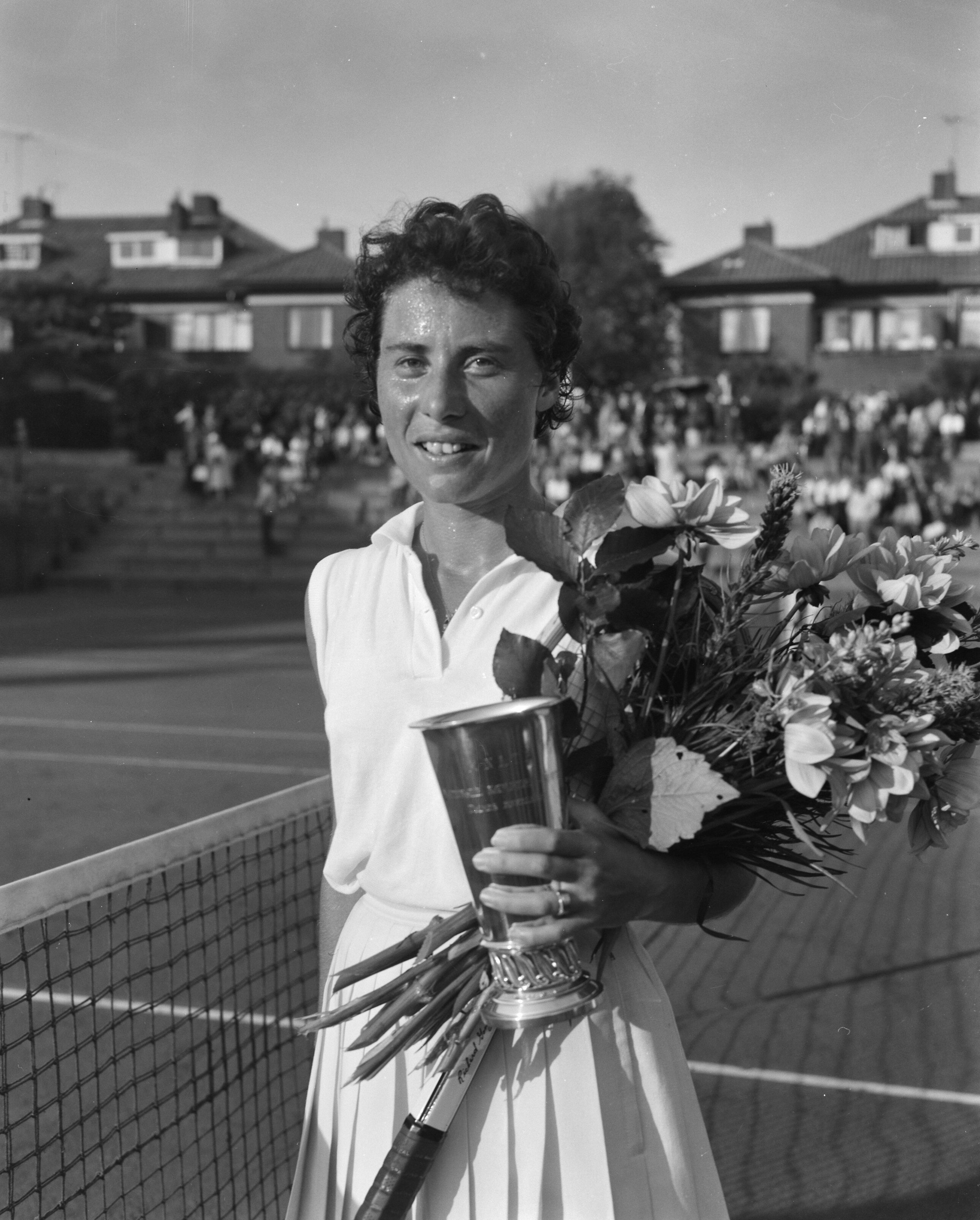
Eva Duldig

- Sir Thomas MacFarland Cherry – mathematician
- Eva Duldig – Austrian-born Australian and Dutch tennis player, author
- Herbert Feith – academic and world leading scholar of Indonesian politics
- John Goss – racing car driver
- Mack Horton – swimmer
- George Johnston – author of My Brother Jack, winner of the Miles Franklin Award
- Colin McDonald – Australian cricketer, born 1928 in Glen Iris
- Ross Ryan – singer-songwriter and producer
- Greg Sher – soldier, killed in action in Afghanistan on 4 January 2009 and subject of honorary garden and plaque at Ferndale Park
- Sandy Stone – a fictional character of Australian comedian and satirist Barry Humphries, with Stone characterised to live in the suburb
- Matthew Wales – convicted murderer of Margaret Wales-King and Paul King, in what became known as the Society Murders
- Jo Weston – netballer
- Gerard Whateley – sports broadcaster

== Sister cities ==
- Glendale, United States

== See also ==
- City of Camberwell, City of Hawthorn, City of Malvern – Glen Iris was previously within these former local government areas.
