= Burke Road =

Road in Melbourne, Australia

Burke Road Victoria
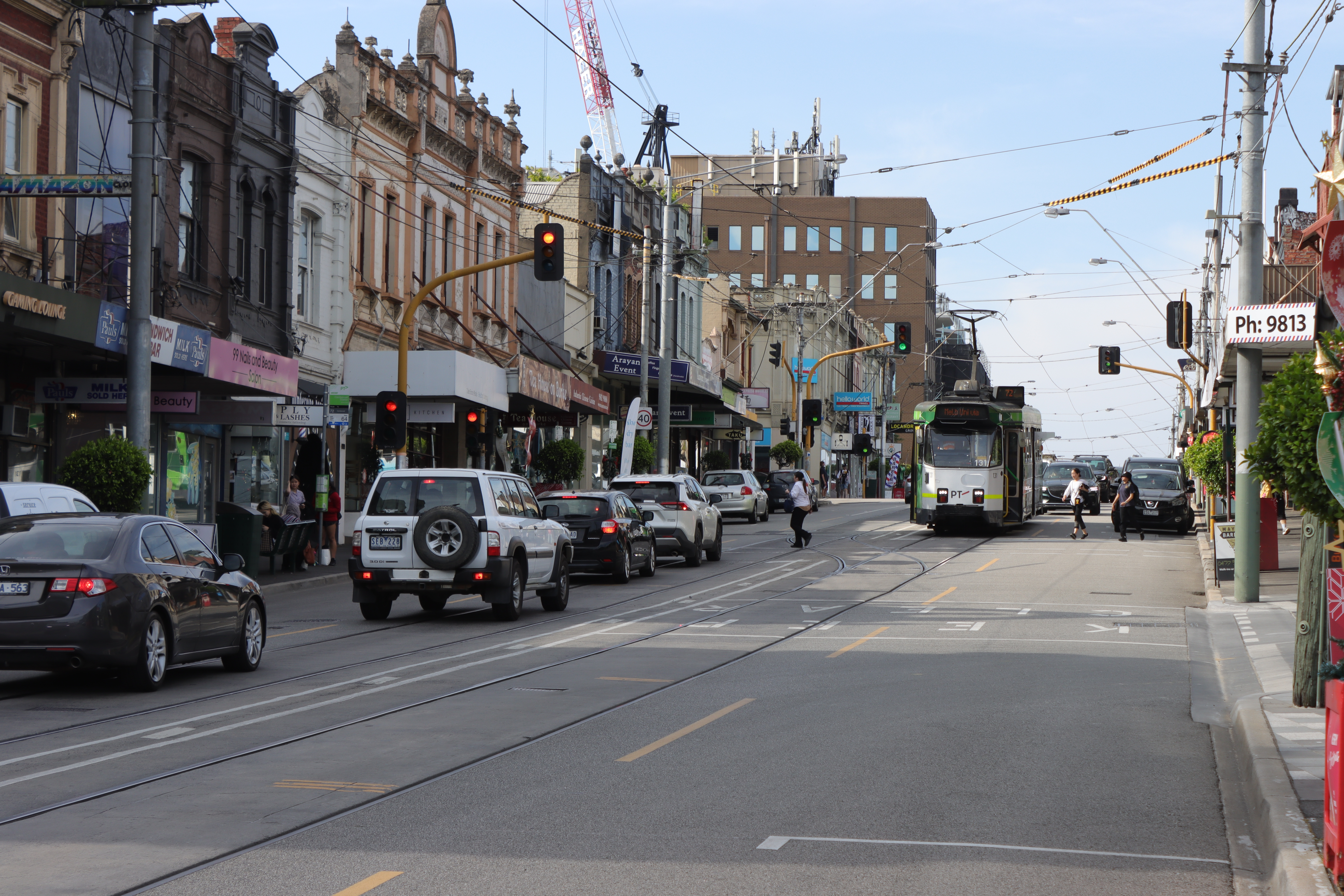
- Burke Road looking north from Cookson Street in Camberwell.
- Coordinates: 37.770361°S 145.063411°E (North end); 37.878070°S 145.047456°E (South end)

General information
- Type: Road
- Length: 12.3 km (7.6 mi)
- Gazetted: May 1983
- Route number(s): Metro Route 17 (1965–present) Entire route; Concurrencies: Metro Route 32 (1965–present) (through Hawthorn East)

Major junctions
- North end: Maltravers Road; Ivanhoe East, Melbourne
- Lower Heidelberg Road; Eastern Freeway; Doncaster Road; Whitehorse Road; Barkers Road; Canterbury Road; Camberwell Road; Riversdale Road; Toorak Road; Monash Freeway; High Street; Dandenong Road
- South end: Sir John Monash Drive; Caulfield East, Melbourne

Location(s)
- Major suburbs: Kew East, Balwyn North, Camberwell, Glen Iris, Malvern East

Burke Road is a major north–south thoroughfare in Melbourne, Australia. It runs from Ivanhoe East to Caulfield East and through the major shopping district at Camberwell.

It is aligned with the western boundary of Elgar's Special Survey, and does not conform to the 1 mile (1.6 km) interval cadastral survey grid for Melbourne.

== Route ==
Burke Road starts at the intersection with Lower Heidelberg and Maltravers Roads, heading south as a dual-lane, single-carriageway road through Ivanhoe East until crossing over the Yarra River, where it widens to a four-lane, dual-carriageway road, crosses the Eastern Freeway, and continues south until it reaches the intersection with High Street, Kilby and Doncaster Roads, where it narrows to a four-lane single-carriageway road. It continues south through Balwyn, over the Lilydale railway line and through Camberwell Junction at Camberwell, crossing the Monash Freeway and Glen Waverley railway line at Glen Iris, eventually to terminate at Princes Highway in Caulfield East, just outside Monash University's Caulfield campus.

Tram route 72 runs along the road between Whitehorse Road in Deepdene, and Malvern Road in Glen Iris.

== History ==
Burke Road was originally known as Boundary, West Boundary or New Cross Road.

The passing of the Country Roads Act 1958 (itself an evolution from the original Highways and Vehicles Act 1924) provided for the declaration of State Highways and Main Roads, roads partially financed by the state government through the Country Roads Board (later VicRoads). A northern extension to the existing declaration of Burke Road, from Main Heidelberg-Eltham Road (Lower Heidelberg Road) at Ivanhoe East to Gardiners Creek at Glen Iris, was declared a Main Road on 9 May 1983.

Burke Road was signed as Metropolitan Route 17 between Ivanhoe East and Caulfield East in 1965. Metropolitan Route 17 continues south, with a brief concurrency along Princes Highway, via Grange Road eventually to Moorabbin.

The passing of the Road Management Act 2004 granted the responsibility of overall management and development of Victoria's major arterial roads to VicRoads: in 2004, VicRoads re-declared the road as Burke Road (Arterial #5874), beginning at Main Heidelberg–Eltham Road (Lower Heidelberg Road) at Ivanhoe East and ending at Princes Highway in Caulfield East.

== Major intersections ==
LGA	Location	km	mi	Destinations	Notes
Banyule	Ivanhoe East	0.0	0.0	Maltravers Road (north) – Eaglemont	Northern terminus of road and Metro Route 17
Banyule	Ivanhoe East	0.0	0.0	Lower Heidelberg Road (Metro Route 44) – Ivanhoe, Heidelberg, Eltham	Roundabout
Boroondara	Kew East–Balwyn North boundary	1.6	0.99	Eastern Freeway (M3) – City	Half Diamond interchange, westbound entrance and eastbound exit only
Boroondara	Kew East–Balwyn North boundary	2.7	1.7	Kilby Road (west) – Kew East; High Street (Metro Route 36 southwest) – Kew; Doncaster Road (Metro Route 36 east) – Doncaster, Donvale	
Boroondara	Kew–Deepdene boundary	4.6	2.9	Cotham Road (Metro Route 34 west) – Kew, Collingwood; Whitehorse Road (Metro Route 34 east) – Box Hill, Ringwood	
Boroondara	Kew–Deepdene boundary	5.3	3.3	Mont Albert Road – Mont Albert	
Boroondara	Hawthorn East	5.4	3.4	Barkers Road (Metro Route 32 west) – Hawthorn, Richmond	Concurrency with Metro Route 32
Boroondara	Camberwell	5.8	3.6	Rathmines Road (west) – Hawthorn; Canterbury Road (Metro Route 32 east) – Canterbury, Surrey Hills, Vermont, Montrose	Concurrency with Metro Route 32
Boroondara	Camberwell	7.0	4.3	Riversdale Road (Metro Route 20 west, east) – Richmond, Box Hill South; Camberwell Road (Metro Route 30 northwest, southeast) – Hawthorn, Glen Iris	Camberwell Junction; No right turns permitted at intersection
Boroondara	Camberwell	8.6	5.3	Toorak Road (Metro Route 26) – Toorak, Burwood, Belgrave	
Stonnington	Glen Iris	9.3	5.8	Monash Freeway (M1) – Chadstone, Dandenong, Warragul, City	Diamond interchange
Stonnington	Glen Iris	9.6	6.0	Malvern Road – Prahran, Malvern East	
Stonnington	Malvern East	10.1	6.3	High Street (Metro Route 24) – Prahran, Glen Waverley, Wantirna South	
Stonnington	Malvern East	10.9	6.8	Wattletree Road – Armadale, Malvern East	
Stonnington	Malvern East	12.0	7.5	Waverley Road – Malvern East	
Glen Eira	Caulfield East	12.3	7.6	Dandenong Road (Alt National Route 1 west/east, Metro Route 17 east) – St Kilda, Oakleigh, Dandenong	Metro Route 17 continues briefly east along Dandenong Road to Grange Road
Glen Eira	Caulfield East	12.3	7.6	Sir John Monash Drive (south) – Caulfield, Monash University	Southern terminus of road
1.000 mi = 1.609 km; 1.000 km = 0.621 mi: Concurrency terminus; Incomplete access; Route transition
