= Transdev Australasia =

Public transport operator in Australia and New Zealand

- Industry: Transport
- Predecessor: Veolia Transport Australia; Transdev Australia
- Founded: 2013; 13 years ago
- Headquarters: Melbourne, Australia
- Products: Public transport
- Total assets: 2,100
- Owner: Transdev
- Number of employees: 5,800+ (2019)
- Divisions: Howick & Eastern Buses; Mana Coach Services; Transdev John Holland; Transdev Queensland; Transdev Sydney; Transdev Sydney Ferries; Transdev WA; Transdev Wellington; Yarra Journey Makers
- Website: www.transdev.com.au

Transdev Australasia is an operator of bus, ferry, light rail and heavy rail services in Australia and New Zealand. It is a subsidiary of French-based, international Transdev. It was formed in 2013 by grouping the operations of Veolia Transport Australia (previously Connex) and former Transdev together, as a result of the global rebranding from Veolia Transdev to Transdev.

Veolia Transport's predecessor CGEA first entered the Australian market in 1998 when it formed a joint venture to purchase the Sydney Monorail and operate the Sydney Light Rail. The old Transdev entered the Australian market in 2001 with the purchase of Shorelink in Sydney's North Shore. Connex entered the New Zealand market in 2004 when it won the tender to operate rail services in Auckland.

As of September 2019, Transdev Australasia employed more than 5,800 people and operated 2,100 vehicles and vessels, delivering more than 150 million customer journeys each year across Australia and New Zealand.

== Current operations ==
=== New South Wales ===
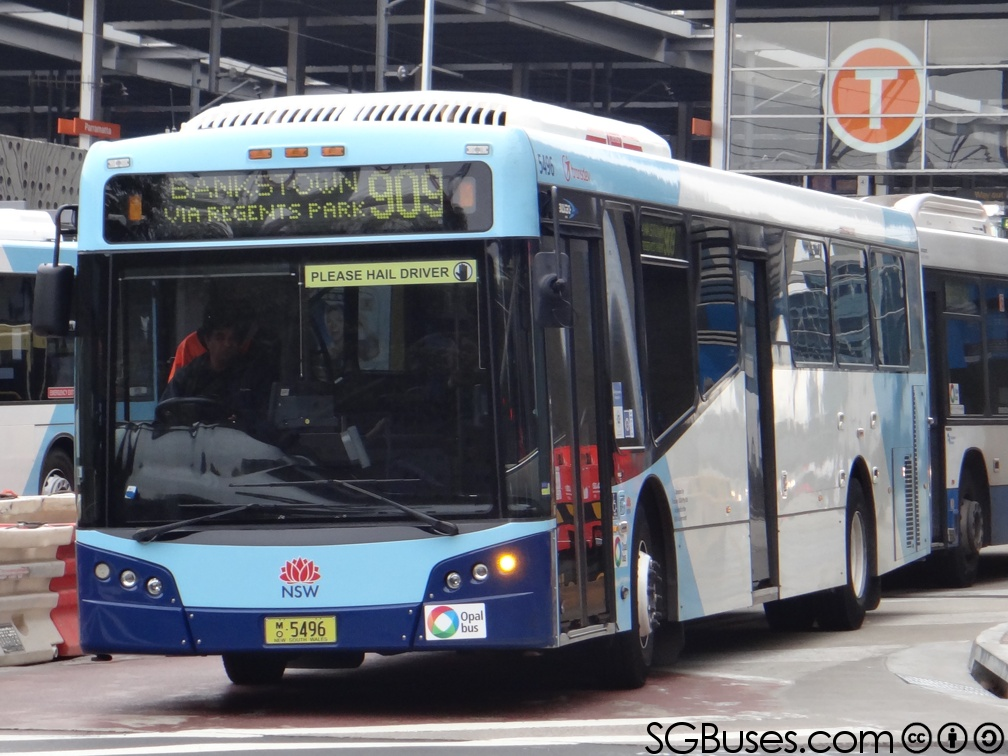
A Transdev NSW Volvo B7RLE

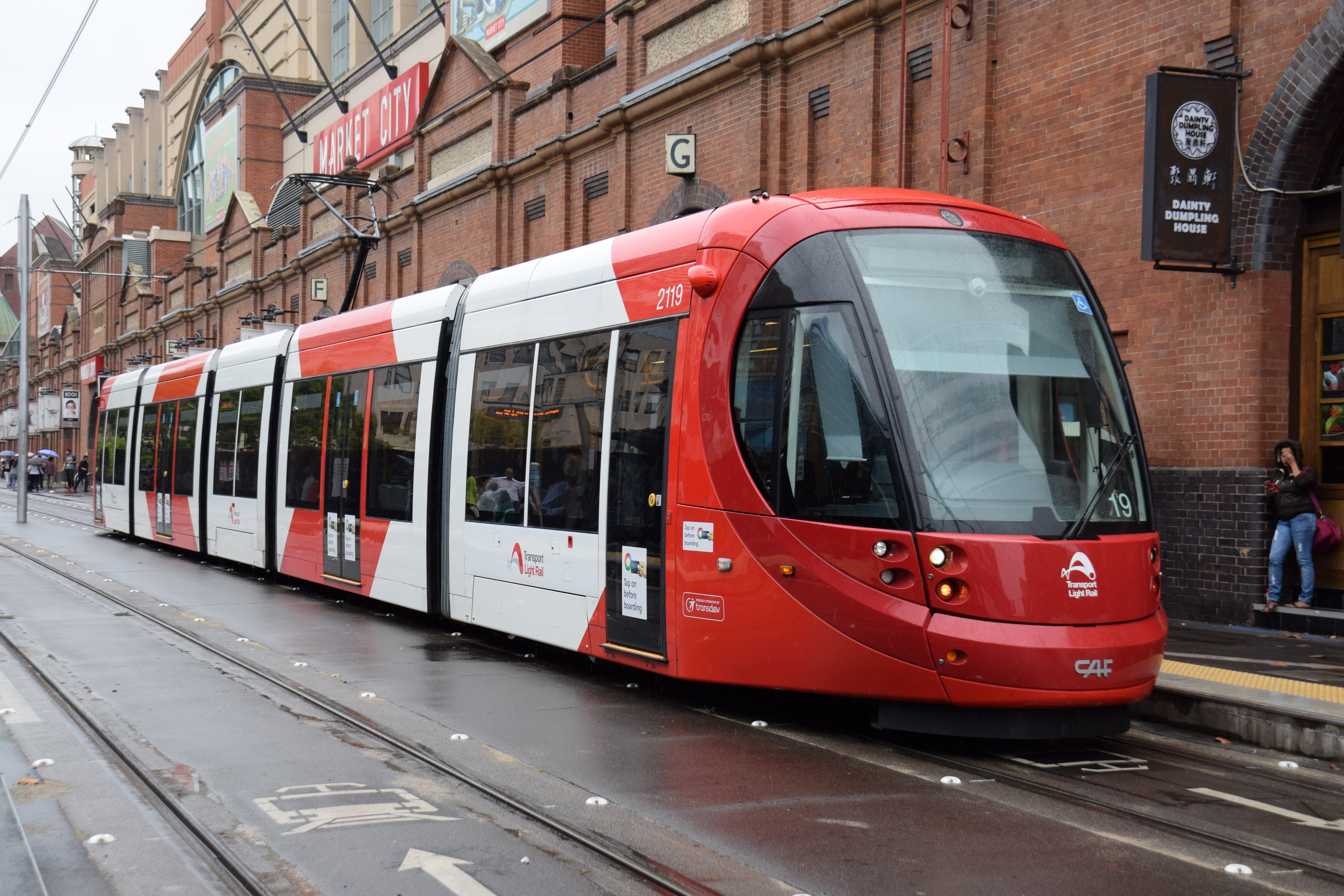
A Sydney Light Rail CAF Urbos 3 on the Inner West Light Rail

==== Transdev John Holland ====
Transdev John Holland is a 75–25 joint venture between Transdev and John Holland which operates bus services in the eastern suburbs of Sydney since April 2022, taking over from State Transit.

==== Transdev Sydney ====
Transdev Sydney operates light rail services in Sydney on behalf of Transport for NSW. The light rail network includes the Inner West Light Rail and from 2019, the CBD and South East Light Rail. Formerly known as Veolia Transport Sydney, it also operated the Sydney Monorail until June 2013.

The operation of the light rail and monorail in August 1998 was Veolia Transport's first venture into Australia, and was still known as CGEA Transport back then. CGEA Transport formed a joint venture (51%) with Sydney Light Rail Company (SLRC), which were the owners of the Sydney Light Rail, called CGEA Transport Sydney. The joint venture was formed to purchase TNT Transit Systems, the owner of the monorail and operator of the light rail. This resulted in CGEA Transport owning the monorail as well as operating the light rail. CGEA Transport, already renamed to Connex in 1999, sold its share of the monorail to the SLRC in early 2001. The SLRC and CGEA Transport Sydney (without the Connex share) later combined to form Metro Transport Sydney. Metro Transport Sydney continued to contract the operation services to the Connex, whose subsidiary was known as Veolia Transport Sydney since 2005.

After the Metro Transport Sydney's purchase by the Government of New South Wales on 23 March 2012, the operation contract with Veolia Transport Sydney was maintained. The monorail was decommissioned on 30 June 2013. A new contract, beginning in mid 2015, covering operation of the Inner West and CBD and South East Light Rail lines was signed with the ALTRAC Light Rail consortium in December 2014. As a member of the consortium, Transdev retained the right to operate the Inner West line (now renamed Dulwich Hill Line) and the new line. The new line opened in stages between December 2019 and March 2020.

==== Great River City Light Rail ====
Separate to Transdev Sydney's light rail operation in Sydney's CBD, Transdev, as part of the Great River City Light Rail consortium, was awarded the Supply, Operate and Maintain contract for the Parramatta Light Rail stage 1 project in 2018. The consortium began operating the Parramatta Light Rail when it opened in December 2024.

==== Transdev Sydney Ferries ====
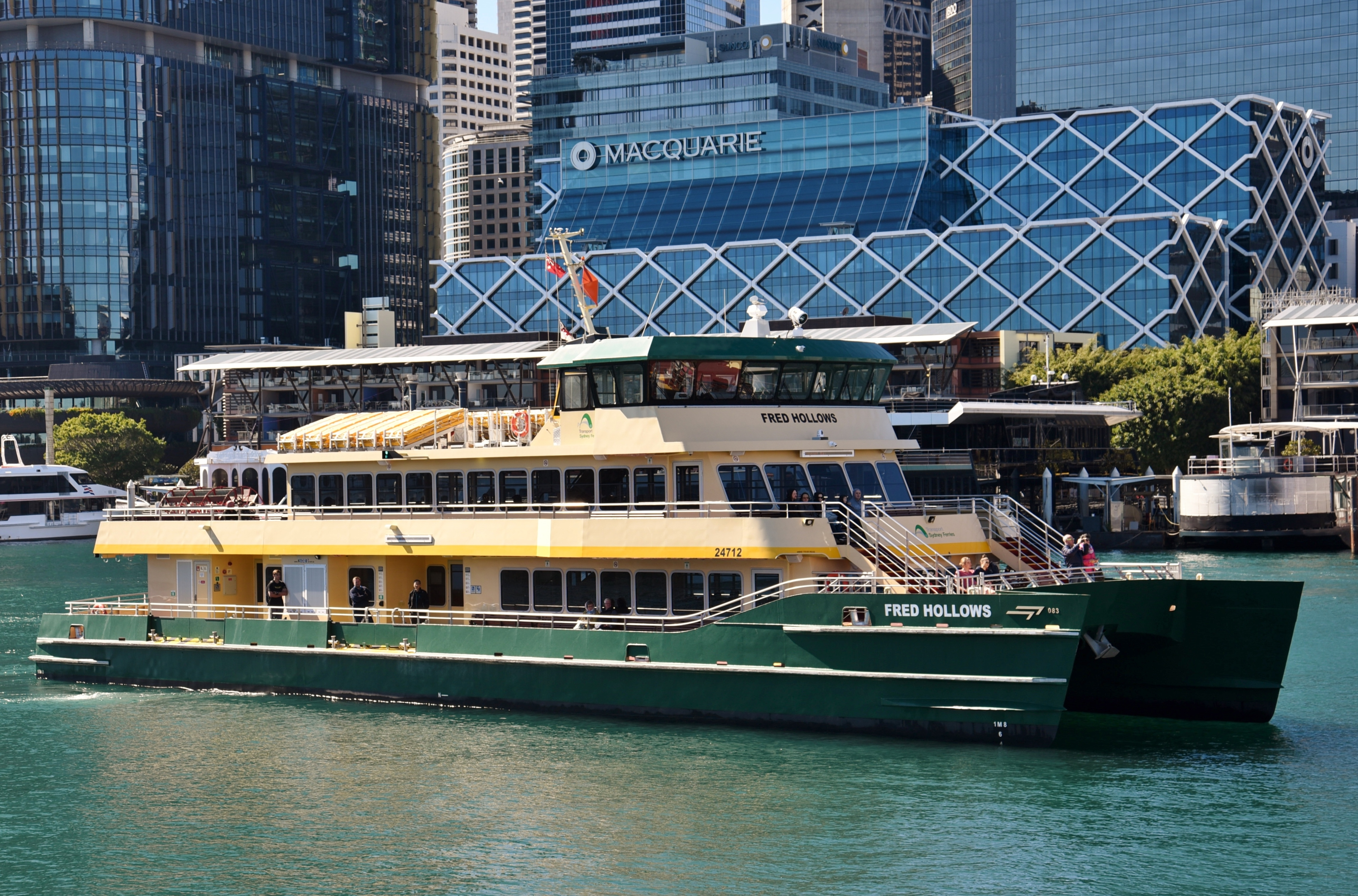
Sydney Ferries Fred Hollows at Pyrmont Bay, August 2018

Transdev owns Transdev Sydney Ferries, which operates Sydney Ferries services under contract to the Government of New South Wales. It was initially formed as Harbour City Ferries, a 50/50 joint venture with Transfield Services (later Broadspectrum) in 2012, until Transdev acquired Broadspectrum's share in December 2016. In July 2019, Harbour City Ferries commenced a new contract until June 2028. To coincide with the contract, Harbour City Ferries was rebranded Transdev Sydney Ferries.

=== New Zealand ===
==== Transdev Wellington ====
Transdev Wellington is the operator of Wellington's Metlink rail network, in partnership with Hyundai Rotem, having been awarded the contract to operate and maintain the rail system in December 2015. The nine-year contract, with two possible three-year extensions, commenced on 1 July 2016 with Transdev Wellington taking over the running of the network on 3 July 2016.

==== Howick & Eastern Buses ====
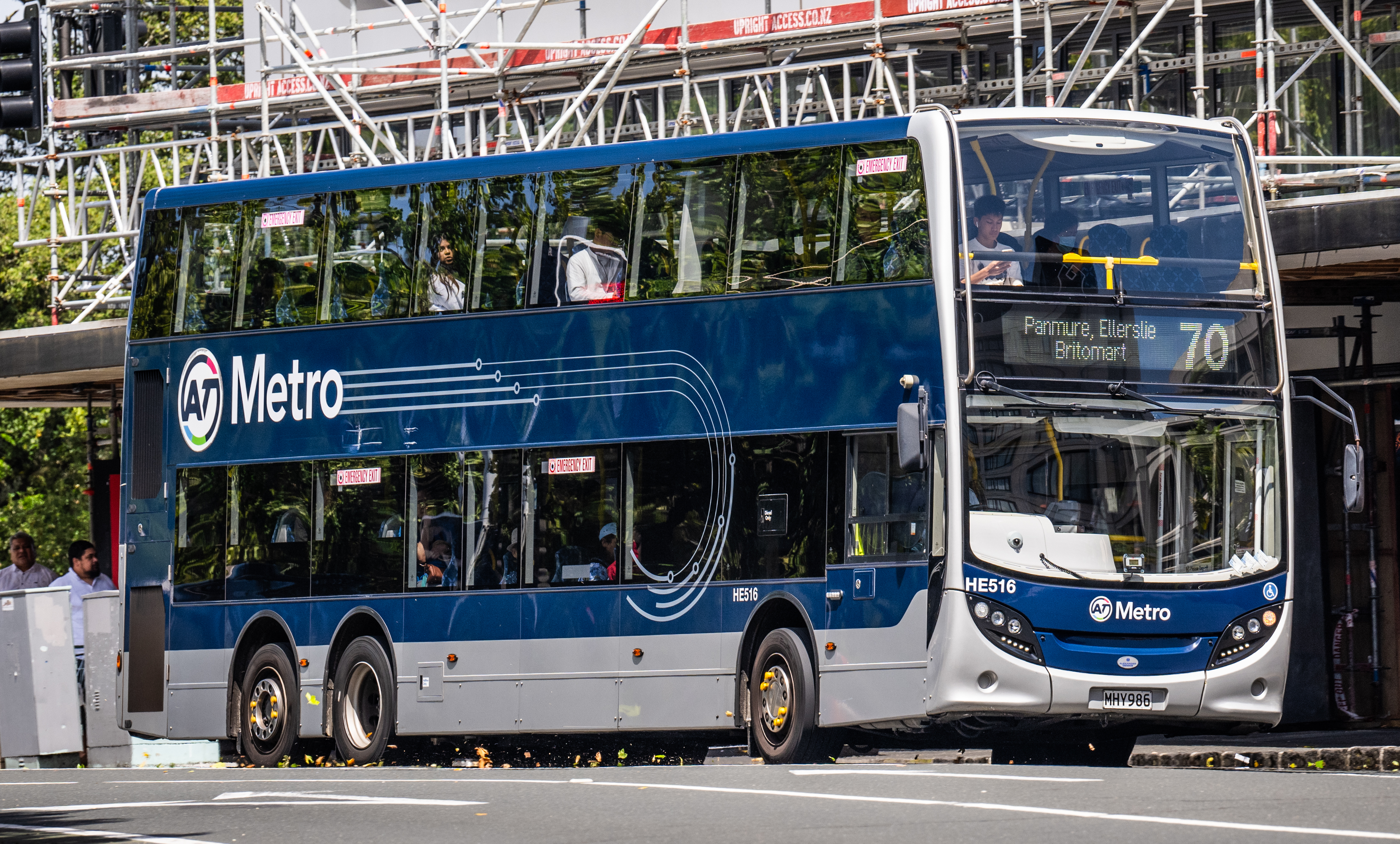
An Alexander Dennis Enviro500 MMC operated by Howick & Eastern

Howick & Eastern Buses is an urban bus operator in Auckland, with a fleet of 145 buses and runs 23 routes under contract to Auckland Transport (AT). In August 2019, Transdev began the process of acquiring Howick & Eastern Buses from the InMotion Group alongside Mana Coach Services in Wellington (see below). The acquisition was completed on 4 November 2019.

==== Mana Coach Services ====
Mana Coach Services is an urban bus operator in Wellington, with a fleet of 66 buses and runs routes under contract to Greater Wellington Regional Council. In August 2019, Transdev began the process of acquiring Mana Coach Services from the InMotion Group alongside Howick & Eastern Buses in Auckland (see above). The acquisition was completed on 1 October 2019.

=== Queensland ===
==== Transdev Queensland ====
Transdev Queensland is a bus company operating services in the Redland City region of Brisbane. It operates 31 services under contract to the Government of Queensland under the Translink banner.

=== Western Australia ===
==== Transdev WA ====
Transdev WA operates 480 buses in Perth under contract to the Public Transport Authority.

=== Victoria ===
==== Yarra Journey Makers ====
In June 2024, the Victorian state government awarded the Yarra Trams franchise in Melbourne to Yarra Journey Makers, a joint venture between Transdev (51%) and John Holland (49%). The joint venture took over from Keolis Downer on 1 December 2024. This marks the second time that Transdev operates the Yarra Trams network, with the first time (1999 to 2009) happening before the Veolia and Transdev merger.

== Former operations ==
=== Australia ===
==== Transdev NSW ====
Transdev NSW was a bus company operating services in the southern and western suburbs of Sydney, including those previously by Transdev Shorelink Buses. The origins of the company that is now Transdev NSW can be traced back to February 1935 when GH Ramsay commenced a bus service between Sutherland station and Woronora River. After series of purchases and changes of name, the company was purchased by Connex in 1999 and rebranded Transdev NSW in 2013. Since 2005, the company's services have formed part of Sydney Bus Regions 10 and 13, with the company also taking responsibility for Region 12 from Transdev Shorelink Buses in 2013. Between May and August 2023, its operations passed to CDC NSW, Transit Systems and U-Go Mobility after the regions it operated were re-tendered.

==== On Demand bus services in Sydney ====
In November 2017, Transdev, in partnership with Transport for NSW, launched RIDE Plus on demand bus services in Sydney's Manly and Eastern Suburbs, and Transdev Link on demand services in the Sutherland Shire. The Eastern Suburbs service ceased in August 2018 and was replaced by a Bridj on demand service that covers a smaller area. The Sutherland Shire operation ceased 17 November 2019.

==== Buslink Vivo ====
Transdev owns 50% of Buslink Vivo, a joint venture with Buslink that from 2013 until 2019 operated employee bus services in Darwin during the construction of the Ichthys Liquified Petroleum Gas project. Buslink Vivo ceased operation in July 2019. During its operation, Buslink Vivo delivered more than 15 million journeys.

==== Transdev Brisbane Ferries ====
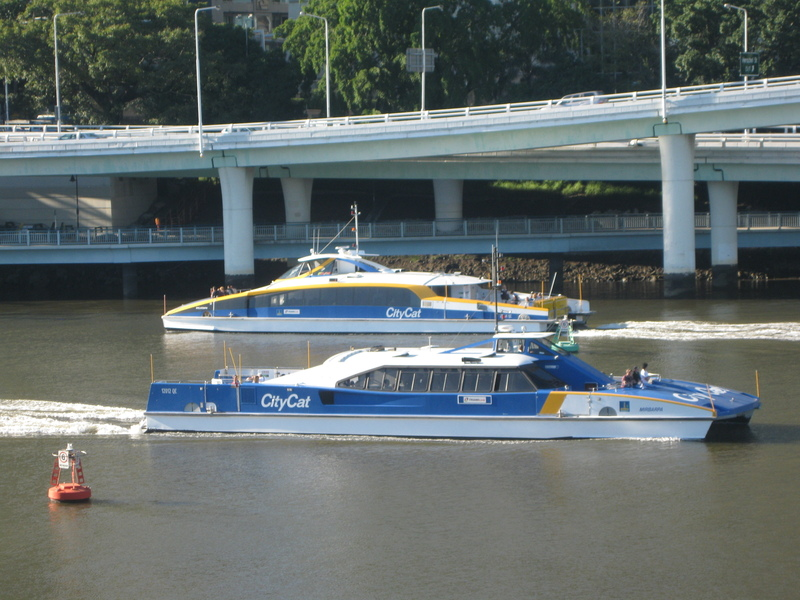
Transdev Brisbane Ferries on the Brisbane River in August 2009

Transdev Brisbane Ferries (formerly Metrolink Queensland & TransdevTSL Brisbane Ferries) was the operator of the Brisbane City Council's ferry network under the Translink integrated public transport scheme in Brisbane.

Prior to 2003, Brisbane City Council contracted River Connections to provide CityCat and Cityferry services in Brisbane. In 2003, Brisbane City Council contracted Metrolink Queensland (a joint venture between Transdev and Transfield Services) to operate and maintain CityCat and Cityferry services in Brisbane for at least seven years. In 2008, the operation was renamed TransdevTSL Brisbane Ferries. In 2010, TransdevTSL Brisbane Ferries were awarded a new 10-year contract. In 2010 Transfield sold its shares back to Transdev, and in 2013 the operation was renamed to Transdev Brisbane Ferries.

Transdev Brisbane Ferries operated Cityferry and CityCat services between the University of Queensland St Lucia campus and Hamilton on the Brisbane River. As of February 2018, Transdev Brisbane Ferries's fleet consisted of CityCats, CityHoppers and CityFerries. Upon being re-tendered, the contract passed to RiverCity Ferries in November 2020.

==== Transdev Melbourne ====
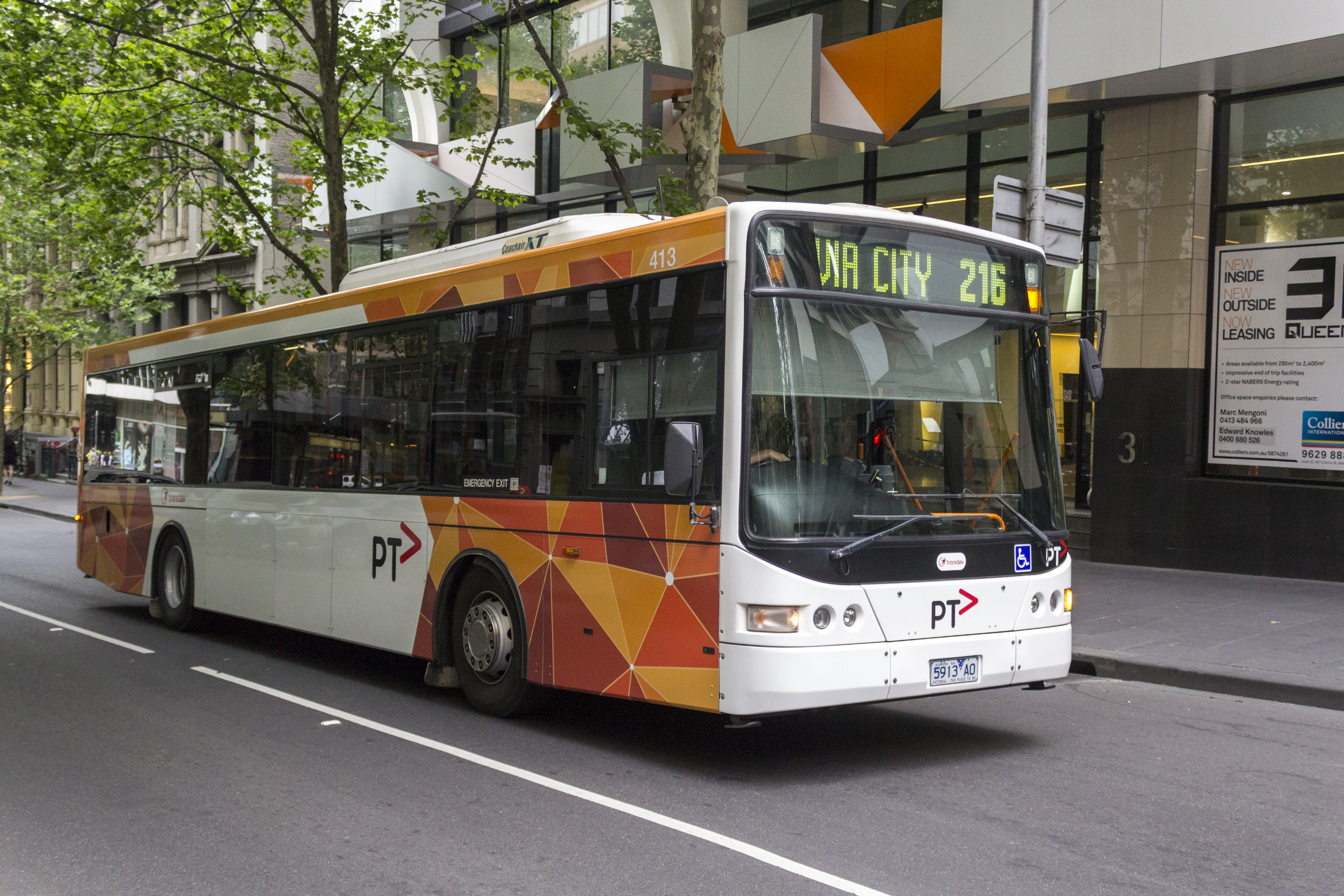
Transdev Melbourne Volgren bodied Scania L94UB on Queen Street in December 2013

Transdev Melbourne commenced operating about 30% of Melbourne's bus network on 4 August 2013, following their successful bid for the Melbourne Metropolitan Bus Franchise. Transdev operates 52 routes across metropolitan Melbourne with a fleet of around 500 buses from four depots. Upon being re-tendered, the contract was awarded to Kinetic Group who took over on 31 January 2022.

==== South West Coach Lines ====
South West Coach Lines is a bus and coach operator in South West Western Australia purchased in November 2007 by Veolia. Following the loss of the TransBunbury and TransBusselton contracts to Swan Transit from January 2015, the remainder of the business was sold to the Australian Transit Group.

=== New Zealand ===
==== Transdev Auckland ====
Transdev Auckland operated urban passenger trains in Auckland under contract to Auckland Transport on infrastructure owned and managed by KiwiRail. In 2021, Transdev in a consortium with John Holland and CAF was shortlisted to bid for the next contract, but lost out to Auckland One Rail. Transdev Auckland ceased on 15 January 2022.
