= Melbourne tram route 68 =

Route 68

Overview
- System: Melbourne
- Operator: Yarra Trams
- Depot: Essendon
- Vehicle: Z class B2 class
- Began service: 6 July 1971
- Ended service: 31 July 2005

Route
- Start: West Coburg
- Via: Brunswick West; Parkville; North Melbourne; Elizabeth Street
- End: Flinders Street Station
- Map: Route 68 map

Melbourne tram route 68 was operated by Yarra Trams on the Melbourne tram network from West Coburg to Flinders Street Station The route was operated out of Essendon depot with Z and B class trams. It ceased operating on 31 July 2005 when Route 55 was altered to run everyday.

== History ==
Route 68 was introduced on 6 July 1971, it ran from Bell Street, Coburg to Flinders Street Station in the Melbourne CBD.

As part of the privatisation and splitting of Melbournes tram network in 1997, Route 68 passed into the ownership of M-Tram.

M-Tram was merged with the operator of the other half of tram network, Yarra Trams in April 2004, with all M-Tram routes, including the Route 8 passing into the ownership of Yarra Trams.

Route 68 was discontinued on 31 July 2005. The Route 68 was replaced by an amended Route 55 which had been altered to run everyday via William Street towards Domain Interchange.

== Operation ==
Routes 68 was operated out of Essendon depot with Z and B2 class trams.
