= Route 68 (disambiguation) =

Route 68 may refer to:

- Route 68 (MBTA)
- Route 68 (MTA Maryland)
- London Buses route 68
- Melbourne tram route 68
- SEPTA Route 68

== See also ==
- List of highways numbered 68
