= Transdev Shorelink Buses =

Bus company in Sydney, Australia

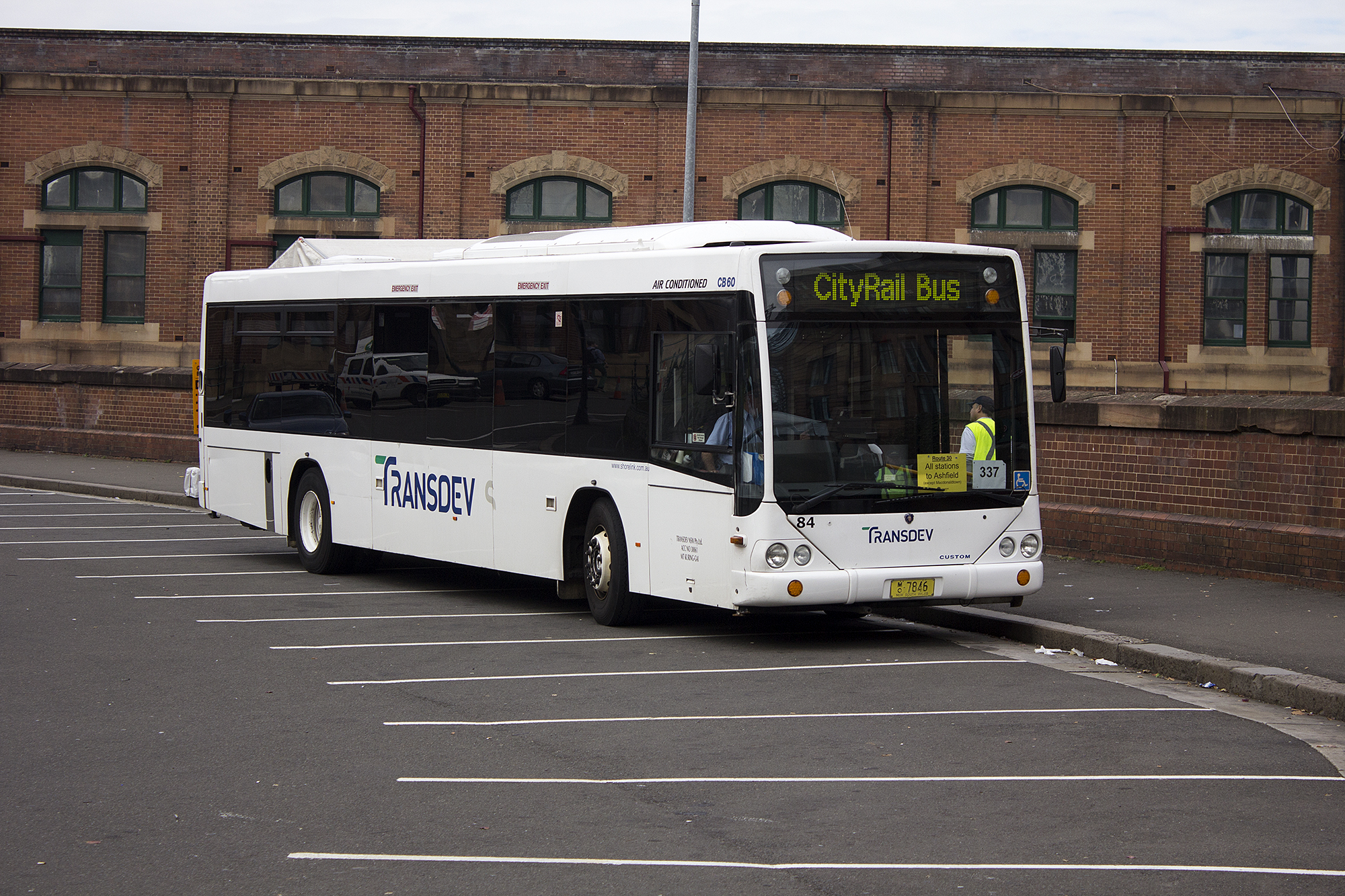
- Custom Coaches bodied Scania L94UB at Central station in July 2013
- Parent: Transdev Australasia
- Commenced operation: 1920s
- Ceased operation: 2013
- Headquarters: Mount Ku-ring-gai
- Service area: Hornsby; Ku-ring-gai; Ryde
- Service type: Bus services
- Routes: 21
- Depots: 1
- Fleet: 102 (June 2013)
- Website: www.shorelink.com.au

Transdev Shorelink was an Australian bus company operating services in the northern suburbs of Sydney. It was a division of Transdev. In 2013, Transdev Shorelink was absorbed into Transdev NSW. Rebranding into Transdev NSW did not happen until 2014.

== History ==
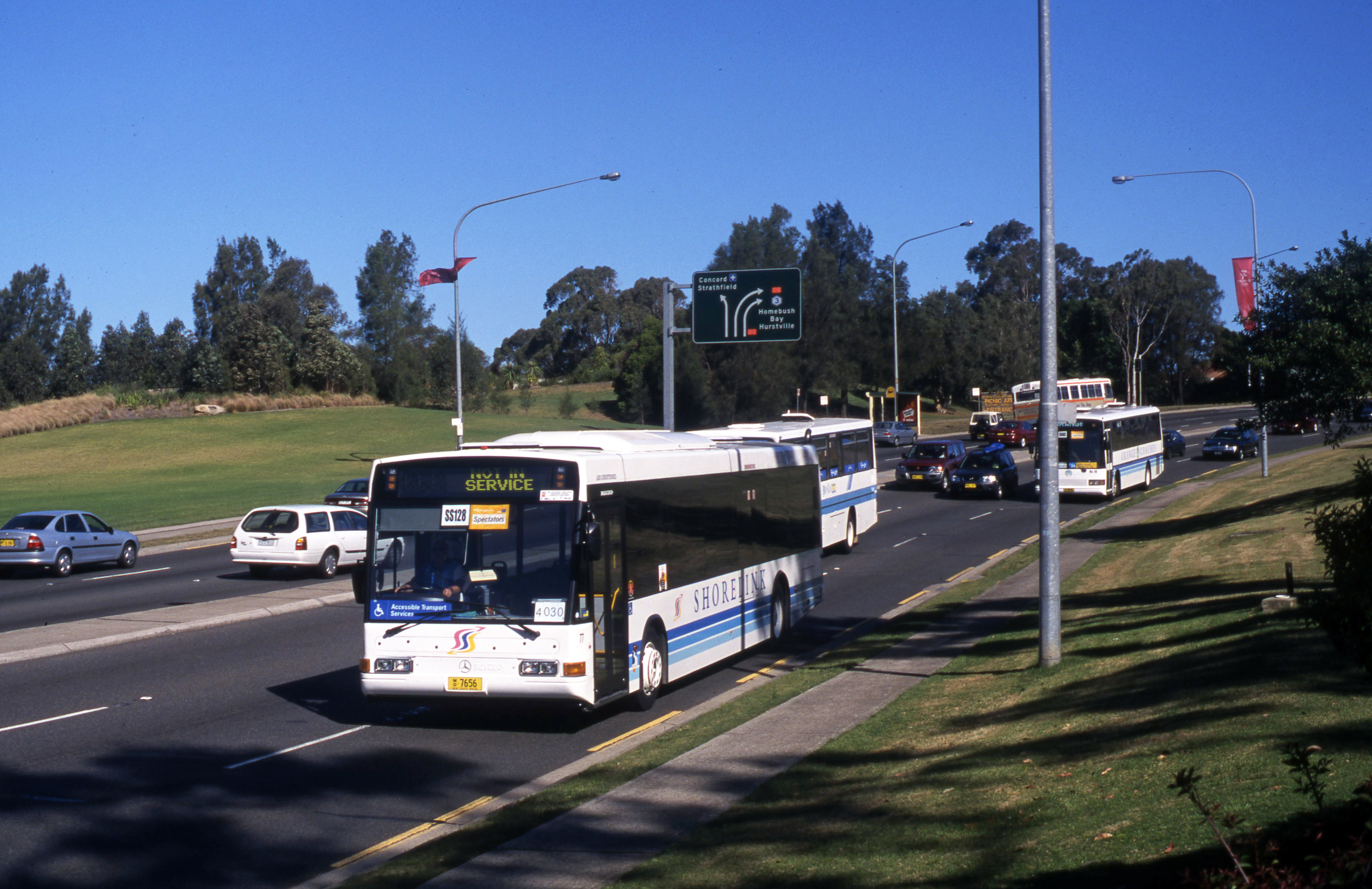
Bustech bodied Mercedes-Benz O405 Shorelink bus in October 2000

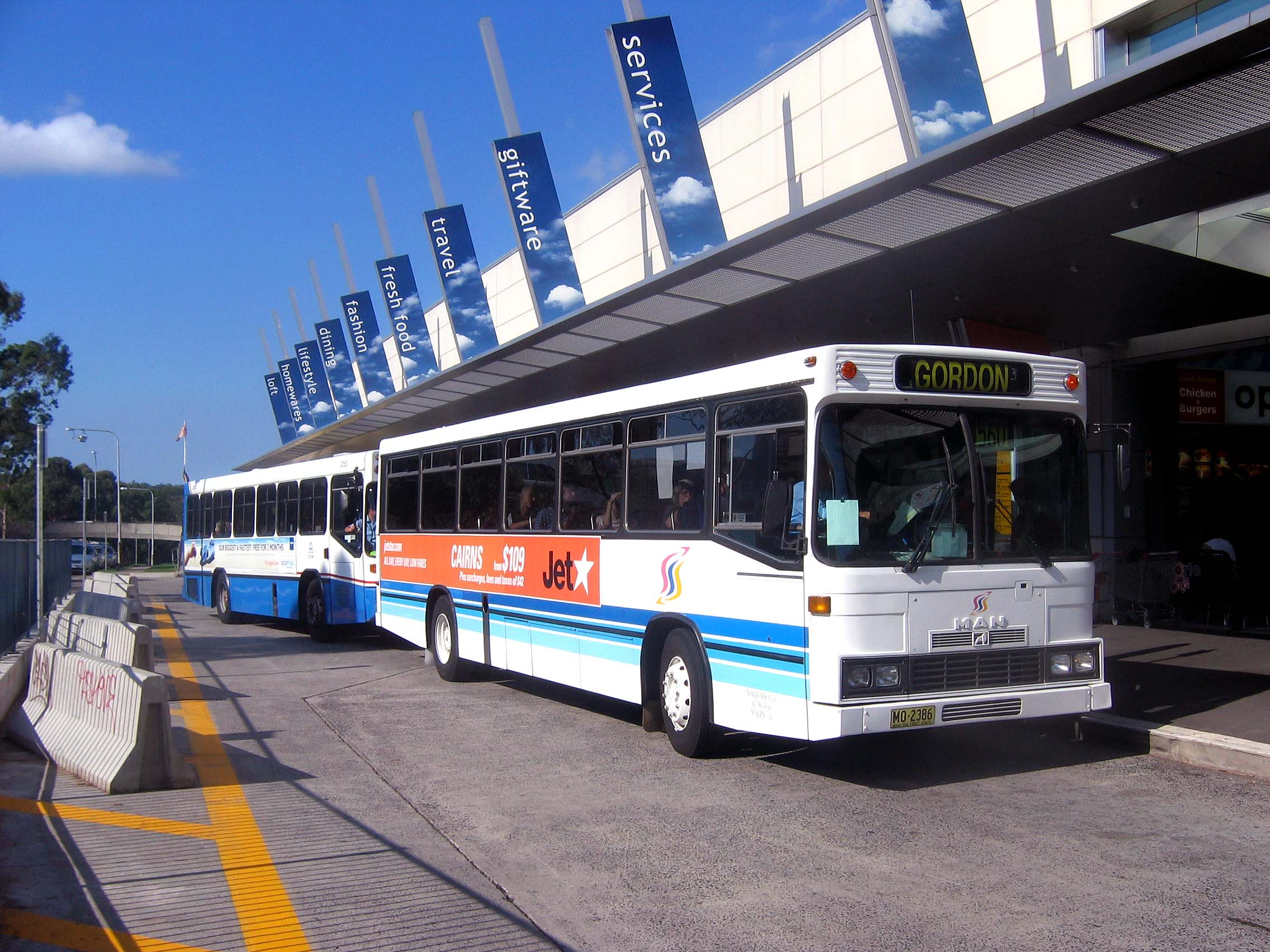
Pressed Metal Corporation South Australia bodied MAN 11.640 still with Shorelink branding, at Macquarie Centre in March 2005

Logo used between 2008 and 2010

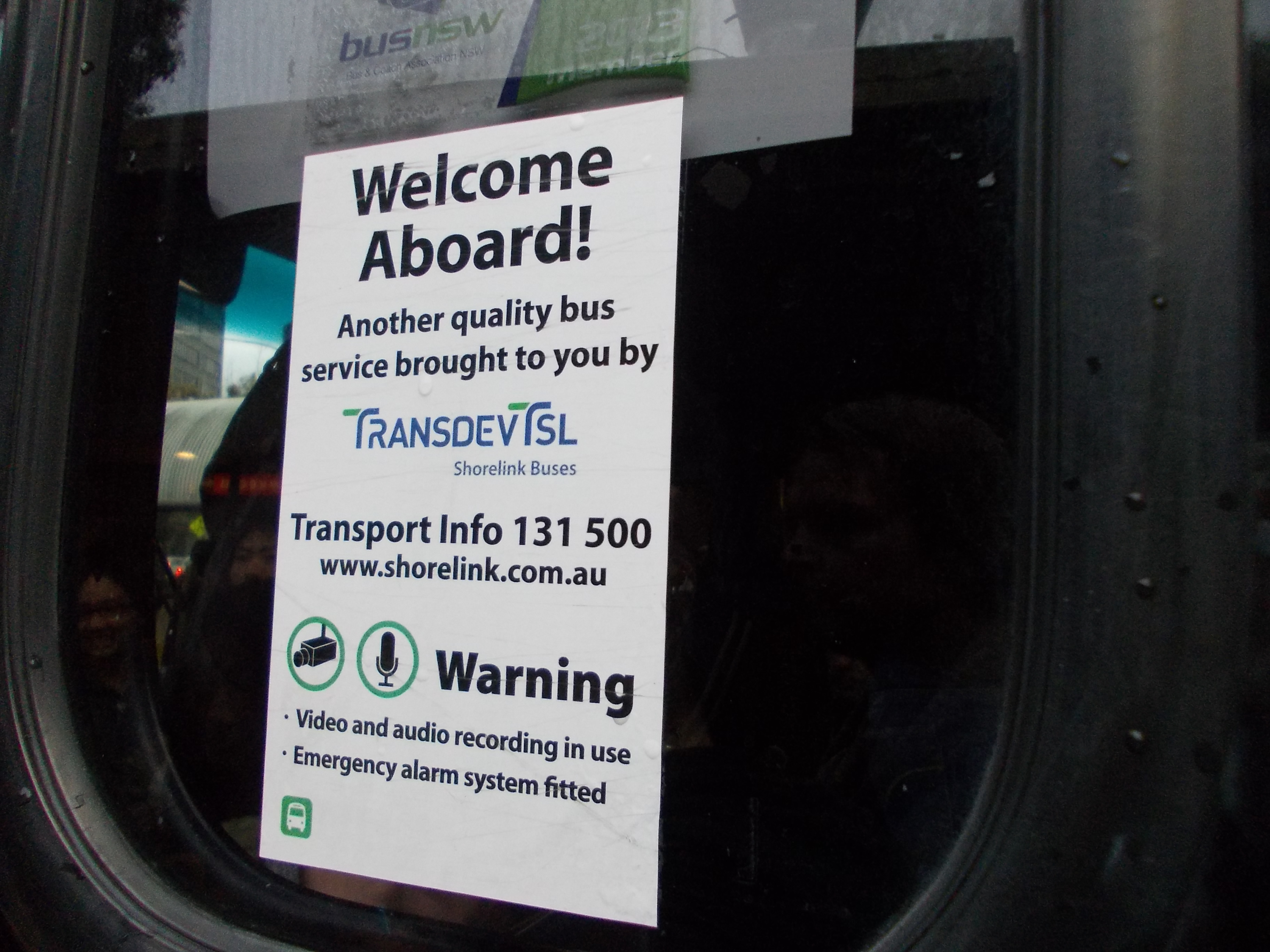
A bus sticker showing the name TransdevTSL Shorelink Buses

In the 1920s, Ku-ring-gai Bus Company was formed and commenced operations along the Pacific Highway between Chatswood and Hornsby. In 1949, a 25% share in the business was purchased by Jim Knox who in 1965 took full control.

The company expanded with the purchase of Hornsby District Bus Service (July 1967), Pennant Hills – Hornsby Bus Co (July 1968), Warringah Bus Lines (July 1972), Griffith's Bus Service, Berowra Coach Services and Talbot's Transport Service (September 1978). It was renamed Hornsby Bus Group in the early 1970s.

In January 1989, Deanes Coaches was purchased doubling the size of the fleet. with the enlarged operation rebranded as Shorelink in January 1990. In August 1991, the Warringah Bus Lines operation was sold to Forest Coach Lines.

In October 1992, Shorelink was sold to John A Gilbert. In March 1996, Shorelink was sold to Frank D'Apuzzo and Peter Simpson, along with other John A Gilbert bus operations.

Since at least the early 1980s a coach operation had been operated under the Koala Tours brand. This was sold in May 1998 to Murrays.

In September 2001, Shorelink was sold to Transdev. In 2005, Transfield Services purchased a 50% interest in Shorelink, forming a 50/50 joint venture with Transdev called TransdevTSL. Rebranding on all buses took place in 2008 when Shorelink was renamed TransdevTSL Shorelink Buses. In 2010, Transfield sold their shares back to Transdev, and the bus company was renamed Transdev Shorelink.

From 2005, Shorelink's services were part of Sydney Bus Region 12. In November 2012 it was announced that Shorelink had retained the contract to operate Region 12.

Following the merger of Transdev and Veolia Transport in 2011, Transdev Shorelink was absorbed into Transdev NSW in 2013. Even so, buses did not get rebranded to the new Transdev logo until mid 2014, and the new Transdev NSW website only opened on 8 September 2014. The Transdev Shorelink website finally closed soon after.

== Fleet ==
At the time of its absorption in 2013, the fleet consisted of 102 buses. Until the early 1980s, the fleet livery was cream and blue when a white and aqua livery was introduced. After experimenting with a blue, grey and yellow scheme, a livery of white with blue, yellow and grey stripes was introduced. This was replaced by John A Gilbert's white and blue livery followed by Transdev's white, green and blue. In 2010 the Transport for New South Wales white and blue livery was adopted.
