= Ventia =

Essential Infrastructure Service Provider in Australia and New Zealand

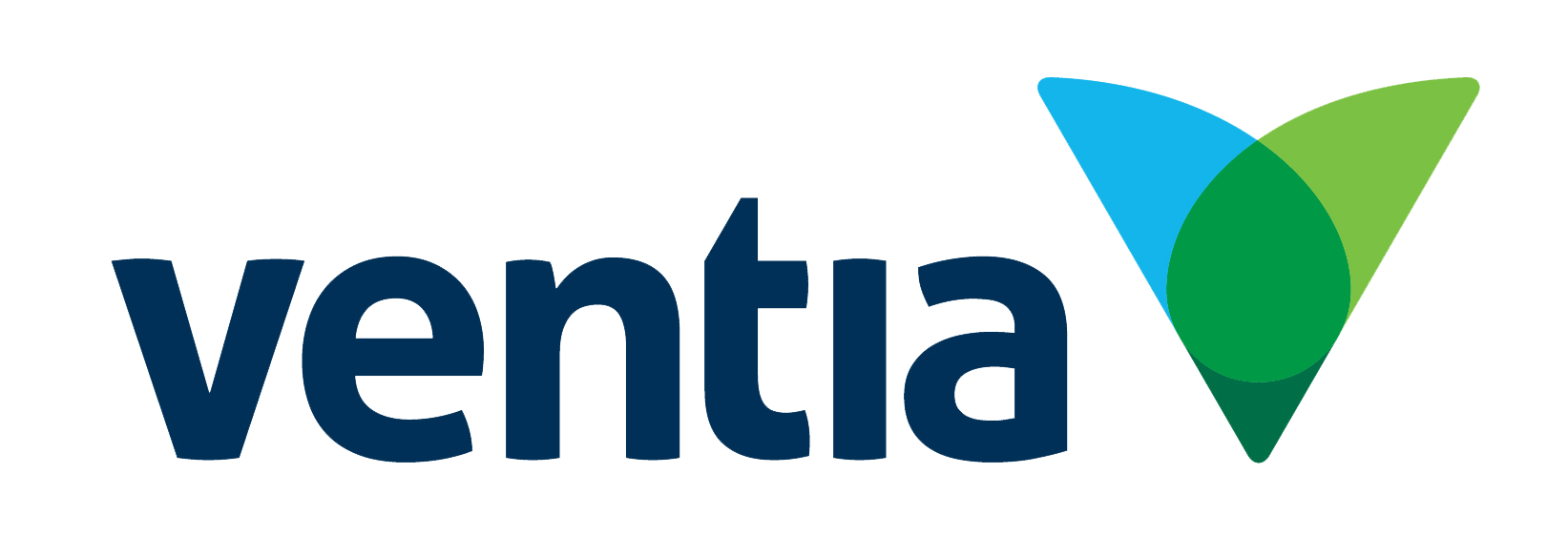
- Traded as: ASX: VNT; NZX: VNT
- Industry: Services
- Founded: 2015
- Founder: CIMIC Group
- Headquarters: North Sydney, Australia
- Key people: Dean Banks (Managing Director)
- Revenue: $5.2 billion (2022)
- Net income: $420 million (2022)
- Number of employees: 36,000 (September 2025)
- Divisions: Defence; Education; Energy & Renewables; Health; Industrial; Justice; Local Government; Maritime; Mining & Minerals; Oil & Gas; Property; Rail; Road; Social Housing; Telecommunications; Water
- Website: www.ventia.com

Ventia is an ASX listed infrastructure services provider based in Australasia that provides a range of services to clients in both the public and private sectors. Ventia was founded in 2015 and is headquartered in North Sydney, Australia. Ventia has secondary corporate offices located in Auckland, Brisbane, Melbourne, Adelaide and Perth.

Ventia's services include facility management, asset management, telecommunications, engineering, environmental management, corrections and more. Ventia has clients including government agencies, utilities, property owners and private companies. Some major clients include Chorus, NBN, Transpower, and the Australian Defence Force.

== History ==
In 1987 Thiess Services launched its environmental services business. In 1994, Visionstream was established as a subsidiary of Telstra, to design and build its cable television network. In December 1996 Leighton Contractors purchased Visionstream.

In 2015 CIMIC Group merged its Leighton Contractors Services, Thiess Services and Visionstream divisions to form Ventia. Apollo Global Management took a 50% shareholding in the company. In June 2020, Broadspectrum was purchased from Ferrovial.

In 2021 Ventia was floated on the Australian Securities Exchange and New Zealand Exchange as a dual listed company. CIMIC and Apollo each retained 32.8% shareholdings. In May 2023, both reduced their stakes to 15%.
