= Broadspectrum =

Australian infrastructure maintenance services company

- Industry: Infrastructure maintenance services
- Founded: 2001
- Founder: Franco Belgiorno-Nettis
- Defunct: June 30, 2020
- Fate: Acquired by and integrated into Ventia
- Successor: Ventia
- Headquarters: North Sydney, Australia
- Area served: Australia; New Zealand
- Parent: Ventia
- Subsidiaries: APP; Broadspectrum Property; CI Australia; Easternwell; ICD; Ten Rivers
- Website: www.broadspectrum.com

Broadspectrum, formerly known as Transfield Services, was an Australian and New Zealand company that provided infrastructure maintenance services. Formerly listed on the Australian Securities Exchange, and later owned by Ferrovial, it was then acquired by Ventia who integrated Broadspectrum alongside Visionstream.

== Overview ==
Broadspectrum operated across diverse industries, including property and facilities management, defence, transport (including road, rail and public transport), utilities (including water, power, and telecommunications), and mining and chemical processing and hydrocarbons. Its clients included major national and international companies, as well as all levels of government.

== History ==
Former Transfield Services logo

In May 2001, Transfield Holdings spun-off its maintenance contracting division along with power, transportation and water assets and listed it on the Australian Securities Exchange as Transfield Services. Transfield Holdings had an initial 45% shareholding.

In July 2004, Transfield Services acquired the New Zealand operations of Serco. In February 2005, Transfield Services purchased instrumentation, electrical and mechanical service group Broadspectrum. In June 2007, Transfield Services Infrastructure Fund (that later became RATCH-Australia) was spun-off, comprising seven former Transfield Services power station and water storage assets.

In December 2010, well-servicing business Easternwell was purchased. Easternwell provides services to the mining, oil and gas and infrastructure sectors in Queensland, South Australia and Western Australia. In July 2011 Transfield Services sold its North American based facilities management business USM to Emcor for US$255 million, and also announced the sell down of 80 percent of its share in the Transfield Services Infrastructure Fund to Ratchaburi Australia, a subsidiary of Thai company Ratchaburi Electricity General.

In October 2012, Transfield Services was contracted to manage the Australian government's offshore immigration detention centre on Nauru. In March 2014, following the death of Iranian asylum seeker Reza Barati, it took over the running of the detention centre on Manus Island from G4S. A group of artists participating in the Sydney Biennale that year threatened a boycott of the festival (whose chairman was Luca Belgiorno-Nettis, managing director of Transfield Holdings) unless the festival ended a sponsorship deal with Transfield. Belgiorno-Nettis resigned his chairmanship of the Biennale.

In September 2014, ahead of a review established by immigration minister Scott Morrison, Transfield Holdings sold its remaining shareholding in Transfield Services, marking the end of its involvement. In November 2015 Transfield Services was rebranded as Broadspectrum after Transfield Holdings gave 12 months notice of termination of the right to use the name Transfield and logo.

Having made an unsuccessful takeover attempt in 2014, in May 2016 Ferrovial acquired the business. In December 2019, Ferrovial agreed terms to sell the business to Ventia. The transaction was completed in June 2020 after being cleared by the Australian Competition & Consumer Commission.

== Transport operations ==
Between 1999 and 2010, Transield Services held a 50% shareholding with Transdev in Transdev TSL that operated bus services in Sydney (Shorelink), ferry services in Brisbane (TransdevTSL Brisbane Ferries) and tram services in Melbourne (Yarra Trams). Transfield Services again partnered with Transdev to operate Harbour City Ferries from 2012 until 2016. From 2011 until 2018, Transfield Services also operated bus services in its own right under contract to the Department of Planning, Transport & Infrastructure in Adelaide (Light-City Buses).

== Controversy ==
The appointment of Transfield Services to provide welfare services at the detention centres on Manus and Nauru was criticised by refugee advocacy groups on the grounds that the duty to shareholders conflicted with the interests of asylum seekers. In February 2014, this led to calls for an artist and audience boycott of the 19th Biennale of Sydney, which Transfield Services supported through the Transfield Foundation, providing approximately six per cent of the Biennale's total funding. Following protests and widespread criticism on social media, Executive Director of Transfield Holdings Luca Belgiono-Nettis subsequently resigned from his position as Chairman of the Biennale Board, and the Biennale severed its 41-year sponsorship relationship with Transfield Holdings. This decision itself led to debate, with boycott organisers saying the boycott was successful, while their opponents claimed it had jeopardised the future of corporations and businesses funding the arts in Australia.
