= Transdev S.A. =

International public transport group

- Industry: Transport
- Founded: 1955
- Defunct: 3 March 2011
- Fate: merged
- Successor: Veolia Transdev
- Headquarters: Issy-les-Moulineaux, France
- Products: Public transport
- Revenue: €2.5 billion (2010)
- Owner: Caisse des Dépôts et Consignations; RATP; Sanpaolo IMI
- Number of employees: 47,000 (2010)
- Website: www.transdev.eu

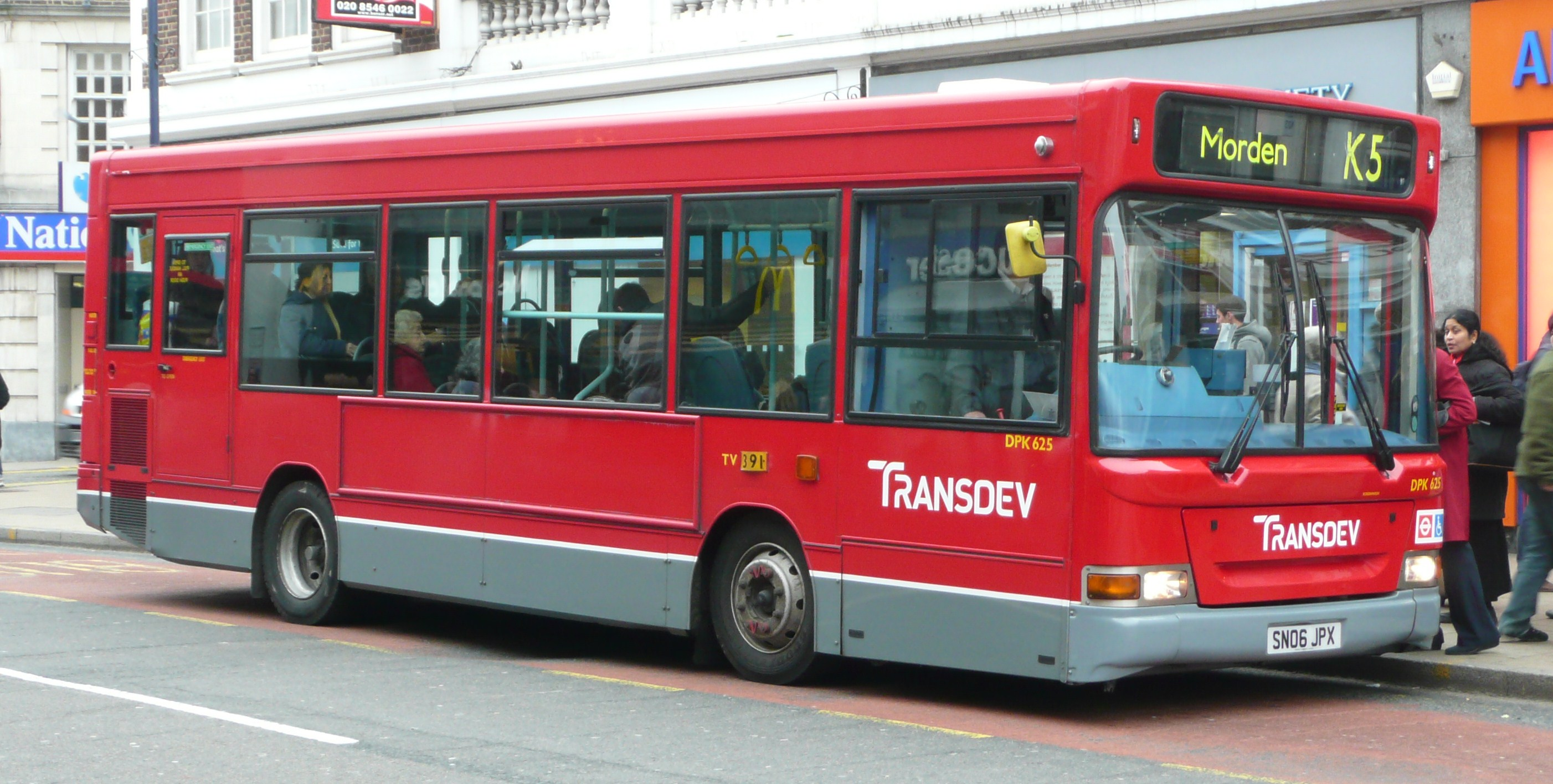
Transdev London Plaxton Pointer bodied Dennis Dart in December 2008

Transdev was an international public transport group based in Issy-les-Moulineaux near Paris, France, and operating in several countries. Originally created as Société centrale pour l'équipement du territoire in 1955 and developing transportation activities since 1973, Transdev was a subsidiary Caisse des Dépôts et Consignations, a French state-owned financial institution. On 3 March 2011, the group merged with Veolia Transport, one of its main competitors, into Veolia Transdev. During 2013, Veolia Transdev was renamed Transdev, recognising the planned withdrawal of Veolia Environnement from ownership of the group.

As part of this merger, the RATP Group, a minority shareholder in Transdev, took direct ownership of a number of former Transdev operations in lieu of a cash payment.

Transdev was also a shareholder of Transamo, a transport engineering and consultancy firm in Europe, which specialises in the project management of public transport projects in France. It was passed onto Veolia Transdev after the merger. Société de Transports intercommunaux de Bruxelles (STIB) is the other major shareholder of Transamo.

== Key figures ==
As of the time of the merger with Veolia Transport, the group had 47,000 employees and had an annual revenue of €2.5 billion. It had operations in France (representing 39% of its revenue, 18,200 employees), the Netherlands (33% of its revenue, 14,700 employees), the United Kingdom (11%), Italy (6%), Portugal (5%) and also in Germany, Australia, Canada, Spain and Morocco. Its fleet included, by its own account, 15,642 buses and water taxis, 542 subway carriages, trams and trains and 4,581 demand responsive service vehicles.

== History ==
Transdev, a subsidiary of Caisse des dépôts et consignations since its creation in 1990, operates primarily in urban and interurban transport, but has recently diversified into specialist markets such as tourism, airport ground transportation and transportation in ski resorts. Due to the nature of franchising in France, the actual number of companies and joint ventures in the group is constantly changing.

=== Australia ===
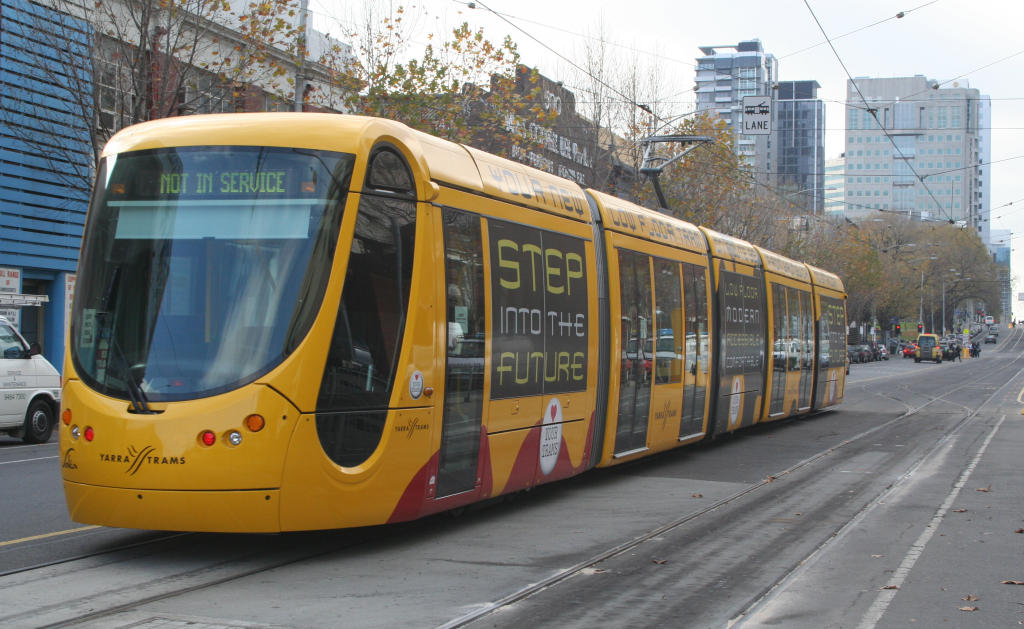
Yarra Trams C2-class tram in Melbourne

In Australia, Transdev held a 50% shareholding in TransdevTSL, a joint venture with Transfield Services.

From August 1999 until November 2009, TransdevTSL operated the Yarra Trams franchise in Melbourne. In August 2001, Transdev purchased Sydney bus operator Shorelink. In November 2003, TransdevTSL commenced operating a seven-year contract to operate Brisbane ferry services CityCat and CityFerry.

The joint venture was dissolved in December 2010, with Transfield selling its shares to Transdev, and the operations in Sydney and Brisbane are fully operated by Transdev.

=== Morocco ===
In 2010, Transdev was awarded a contract to operate the Rabat-Salé tramway in Morocco for six years, but the tramway did not open until after the Veolia-Transdev merger in May 2011. Despite so, the tramway operated with Transdev's old logo until the rebranding of Veolia Transdev in 2013.

=== Netherlands ===
In October 2007, Transdev entered a 75/25 joint venture with Bank Nederlandse Gemeenten to purchase a 67% share in Connexxion. This resulted in Transdev owning 50% of the business.

=== Portugal ===
In 2002 Transdev started operating the Porto Metro system.

=== United Kingdom ===
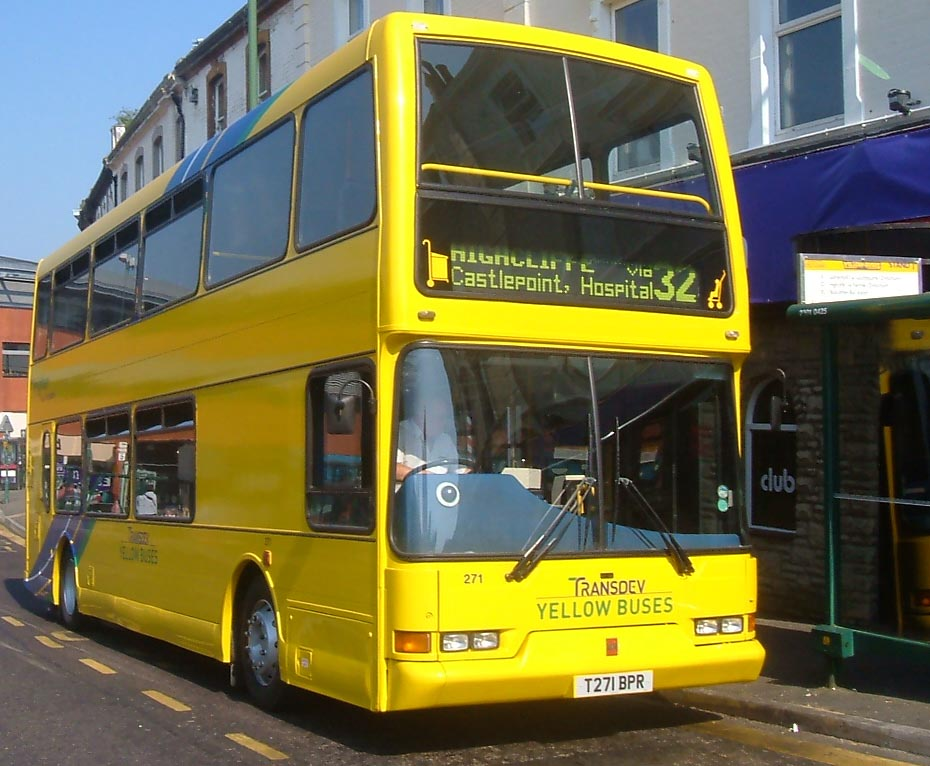
A Transdev Yellow Buses East Lancs Lolyne bodied Dennis Trident 2 in Bournemouth in June 2006

Transdev became the first continental European company to acquire an urban bus network in the UK with the purchase of London United in August 1997, giving the company a 9% share of the London bus market. In November 2002, a further London business, London Sovereign, was purchased.

In March 2004 as part of the Arrow Light Rail consortium it commenced operating the Nottingham Express Transit tram network with Nottingham City Transport, a company which it subsequently purchased an 18% stake.

In December 2005, Transdev purchased a 90% shareholding in Yellow Buses, Bournemouth.

In January 2006, Transdev purchased the Blazefield Group with 305 buses.

=== Aftermath of merger with Veolia Transport ===
Transdev merged with Veolia Transport to form Veolia Transdev in March 2011. However, RATP owned 25.6% stake of Transdev. As part of its withdrawal from Transdev's capital, its stake would be exchanged for some of Transdev's operations, for a total value equal to that of its holdings. Some of the operations transferred were:

- Transdev Yellow Buses (England)
- London United (England)
- DolomitiBus (Italy)
- Vienne Mobilités (France)
- Transdev Champagne (France)
- Transdev Savoie (France)

London Sovereign, which was passed on to Veolia Transdev, would also be sold to RATP Group in April 2014.

As of January 2016, most of Transdev's operations (including Moroccan) have remained in the new Transdev company, with different names and most bearing the new Transdev logo. However, the Arrow Light Rail contract to operate Nottingham Express Transit was cancelled in 2011 when Tramlink Nottingham was selected as the preferred bidder for the construction of Phase 2 of the light rail, with its final day of operation on 16 December 2011.

== Operations prior to merger ==
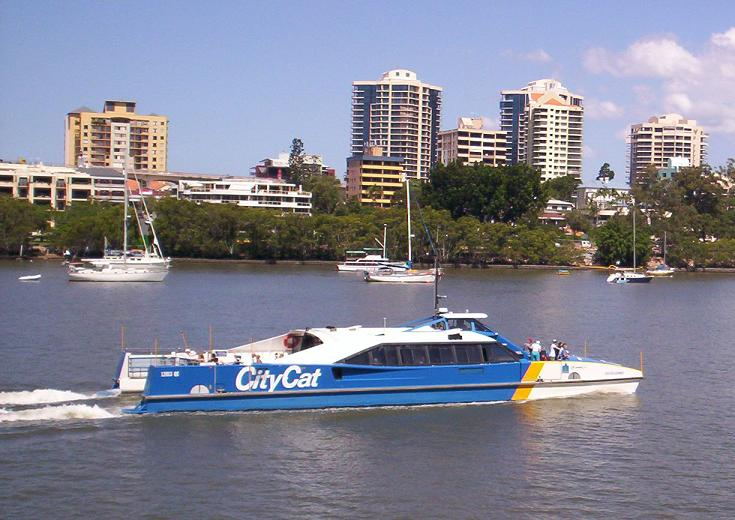
CityCat ferry in Brisbane

Upon its merger with Veolia Transport, Transdev operated the following services:

=== Australia ===
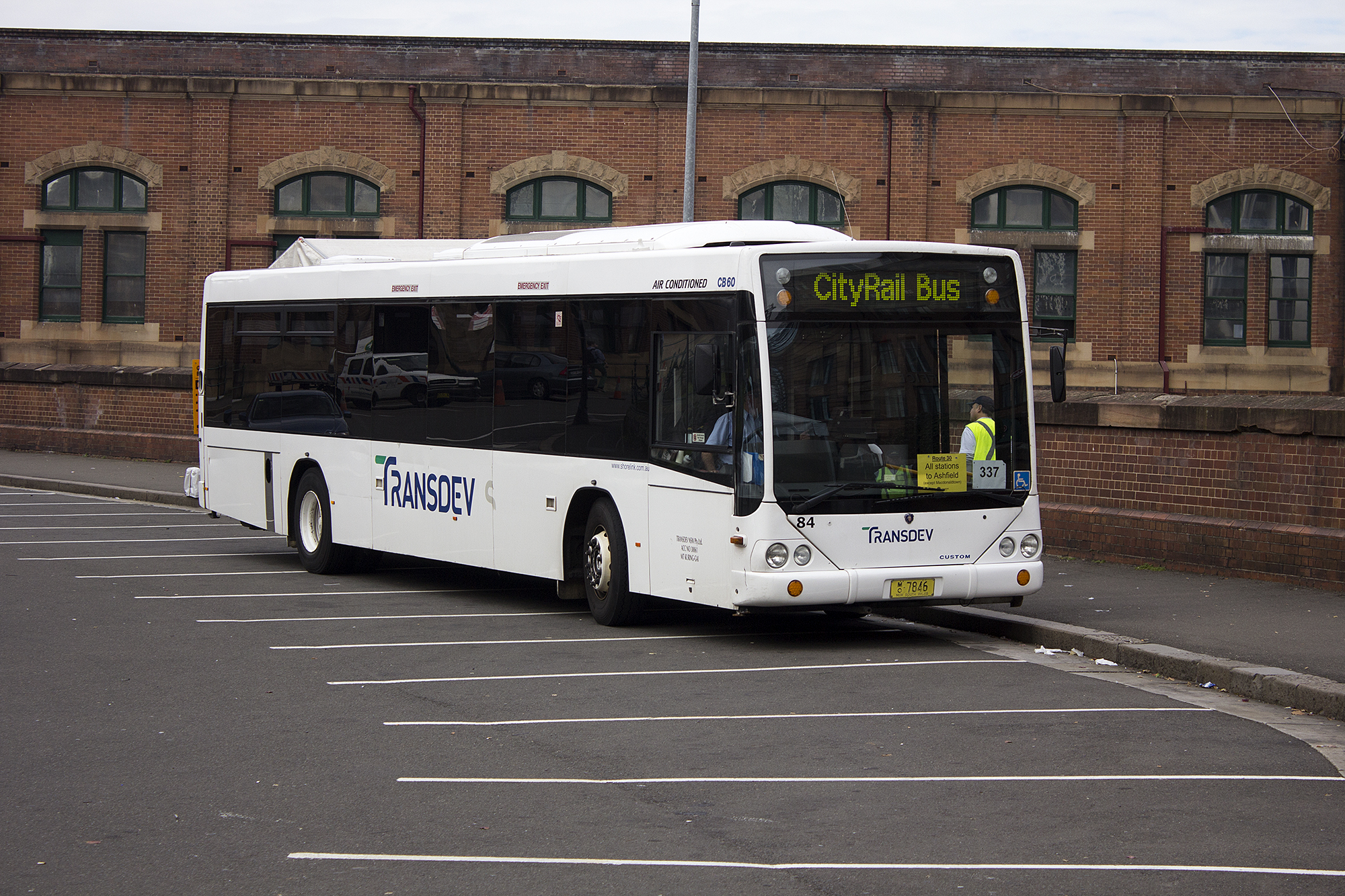
Transdev Shorelink Custom Coaches bodied Scania L94UB in Sydney in July 2013

- Transdev Brisbane Ferries
- Transdev Shorelink in Sydney

=== Canada ===
- Transdev Limocar a coach and transit bus operator in the province of Québec

=== France ===
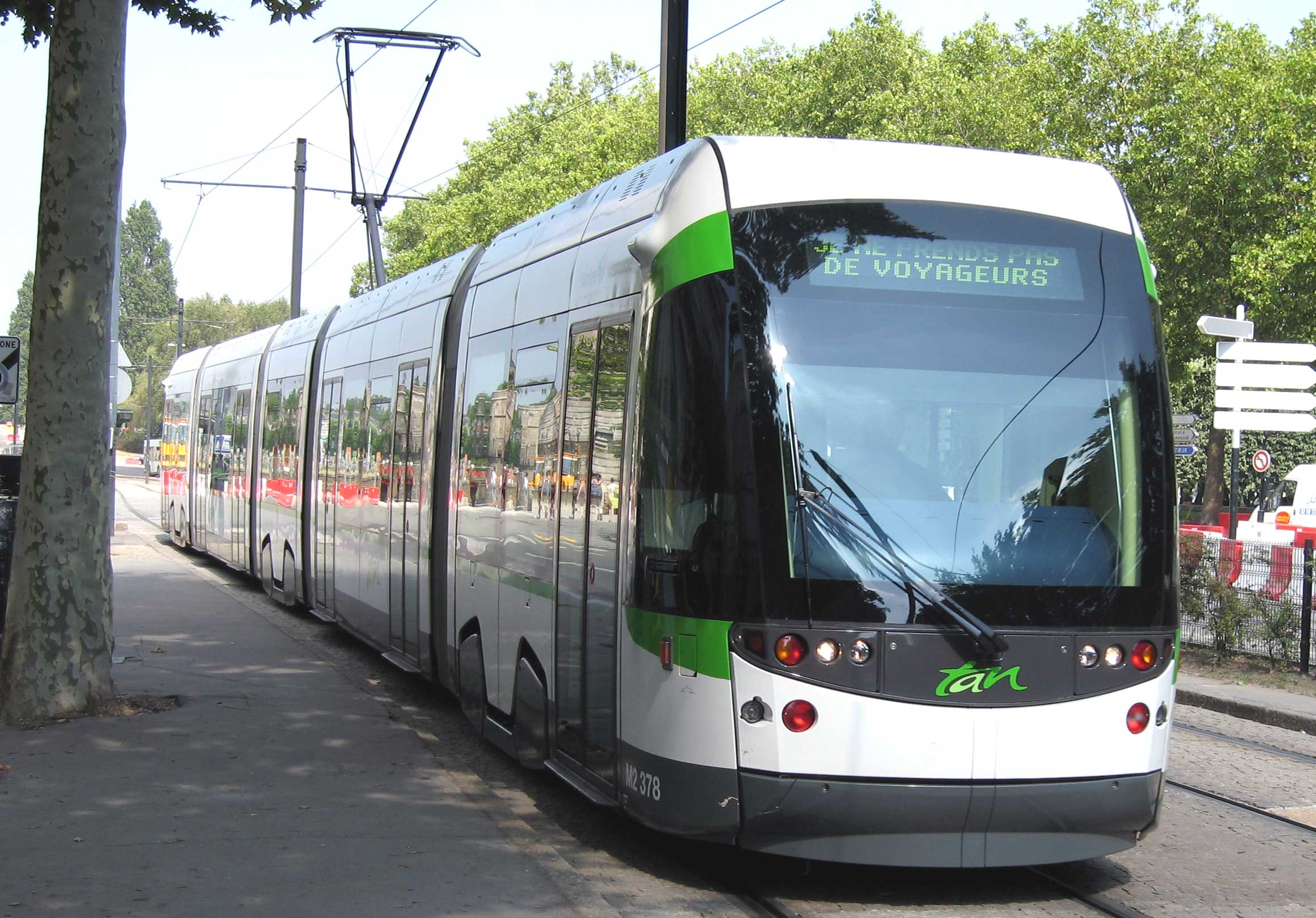
A Semitan tram in Nantes

- Semitan, the bus and tram operator for the city of Nantes
- Soléa, the bus and tram operator for the city of Mulhouse
- Transdev Champagne, Reims
- Transdev Savoie, Haute Savoie
- Vienne Mobilités (sold to RATP)

=== Germany ===
In Germany Transdev SZ operated seven regional bus companies in the German federal states of Rhineland-Palatinate, Hesse and North Rhine-Westphalia with 350 Employees and 360 buses. The headquarters was in Siegen. (North Rhine-Westphalia)

=== Italy ===
- DolomitiBus (sold to RATP)

=== Netherlands ===
Transdev owned a 50% share in Connexxion.

=== Portugal ===
- Transdev operated in some Northern regions and is headquartered in Coimbra, where it also operated.

=== Spain ===
- Metropolitano de Tenerife (MTSA), operator of Tenerife Tram (Transdev (8.5%) together with Saycr and Ineco to form 14% stake)

=== United Kingdom ===
- Transdev London Sovereign (later sold to RATP in 2014)
- Transdev London United (sold to RATP)
- Transdev Yellow Buses (sold to RATP)
- Transdev Blazefield
  - Lancashire United
  - Transdev in Burnley & Pendle
  - Transdev in Harrogate
  - Transdev in Keighley
  - Transdev York
  - Yorkshire Coastliner
- Arrow Light Rail, operator of Nottingham Express Transit (18% stake, together with Nottingham City Transport, Bombardier Transportation, Carillion, Galaxy, Innisfree)
