= Yarra Trams =

Tram operator in Melbourne, Australia

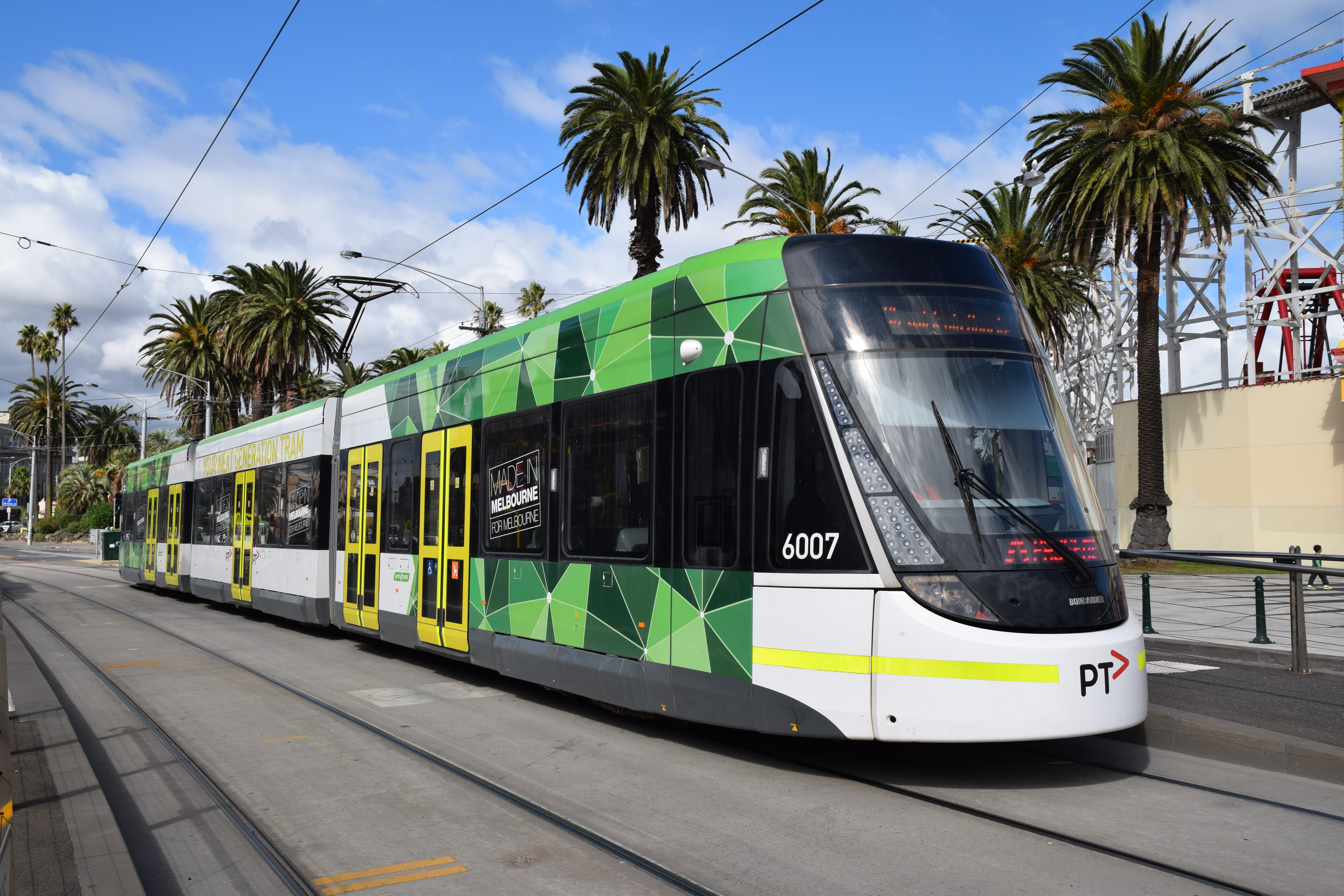
- E-class tram, 2016
- Industry: Transportation company
- Predecessor: Public Transport Corporation
- Founded: 1 July 1998
- Headquarters: Melbourne
- Area served: Melbourne
- Key people: Vincent Destot (CEO)
- Parent: TransdevTSL (1999–2004, 2004–2009); Keolis Downer (2009–2024); Transdev & John Holland (2024–present)
- Website: www.yarratrams.com.au

Yarra Trams is the trading name of the operator of the tram network in Melbourne, Australia, which is owned by VicTrack and leased to Yarra Trams by the Victorian Department of Transport and Planning. Since December 2024, the current franchise is operated by Yarra Journey Makers, a joint venture of Transdev and John Holland.

As at May 2014, Yarra Trams operated 487 trams, across 26 tram routes, including a free City Circle tourist tram, and over 1,763 tram stops. With 250 km (155.3 mi) of double track, Melbourne's tram network is the largest in the world. In 2015/16, 203.8 million journeys were taken on Melbourne's trams, with trams travelling more than 24.8 million kilometres (15.4 million miles) annually. Each week Yarra Trams operates 31,400 scheduled tram services, which results in trams operating for approximately 20 hours per day and a team of 24-hour operations staff completing network maintenance and cleaning.

== History ==
Yarra Trams – TransdevTSL Logo

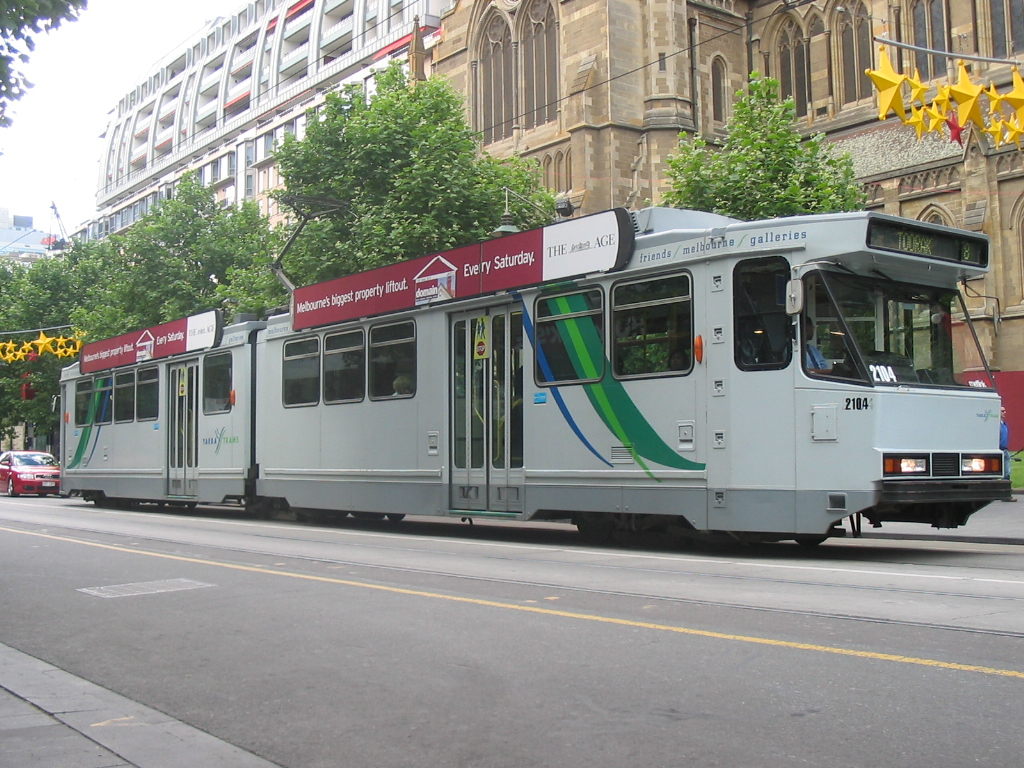
B2-class tram 2104 on Swanston Street in an early TransdevTSL livery, 2005

In October 1997, in preparation for privatisation, it was announced that the tram operations of the Public Transport Corporation would be split into two business units, Swanston Trams and Yarra Trams. The split became effective on 1 July 1998.

=== TransdevTSL ===
MetroLink Victoria Pty Ltd, a joint venture between Transfield Services (50%), Transdev (30%) and Egis (20%), successfully bid to take over the Yarra Trams services from 29 August 1999. Transdev bought out Egis' share in 2000. MetroLink Victoria became part of TransdevTSL in 2007.

The joint venture inherited 23 W, 31 Z3, 28 A1, 42 A2, two B1 and 55 B2 class trams, and took over the operation of 10 routes and four depots: Camberwell, East Preston, Kew and Southbank. In March 2000 a new white with green and blue stripes and grey skirt livery was introduced.

After National Express, which operated the other half of the network, handed back its M>Tram franchise, having been unable to renegotiate revised financial terms, the State Government temporarily took it over. In May 2003, the State Government announced it would establish a single company to operate both networks, and was negotiating with TransdevTSL to operate it. In February 2004, an agreement was reached, and the networks were reunited on 18 April 2004 under the Yarra Trams brand.

=== Keolis Downer ===
When the franchise was next tendered, Transdev TSL and Keolis Downer were shortlisted to bid. In June 2009, the franchise was awarded to Keolis Downer with the new franchise commencing on 30 November 2009. The Yarra Trams brand was retained. Keolis Downer introduced a new Yarra Trams logo, along with a new livery featuring yellow doors.

In September 2017, it was announced that the franchise is to be extended until November 2024, but with tougher conditions.

=== Yarra Journey Makers ===
In June 2024, the Yarra Trams franchise was awarded to Yarra Journey Makers, a joint venture between Transdev (51%) and John Holland (49%). The new operator commenced operations on 1 December 2024 and will continue to use the Yarra Trams brand. It is second time that Transdev has been involved in operating the Yarra Trams network.

== Operations ==
=== Fleet ===
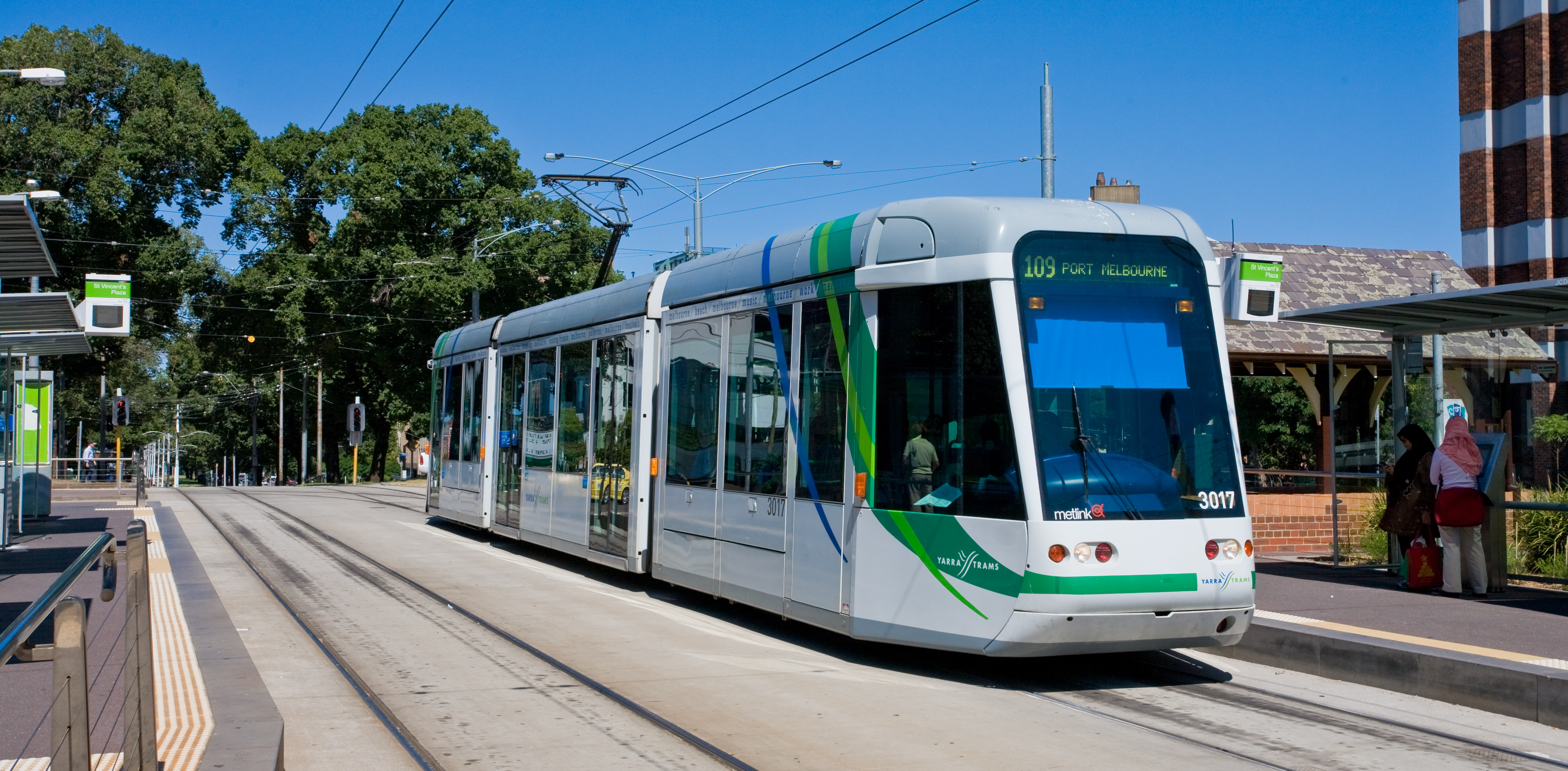
C-class Melbourne tram in TransdevTSL livery, 2008

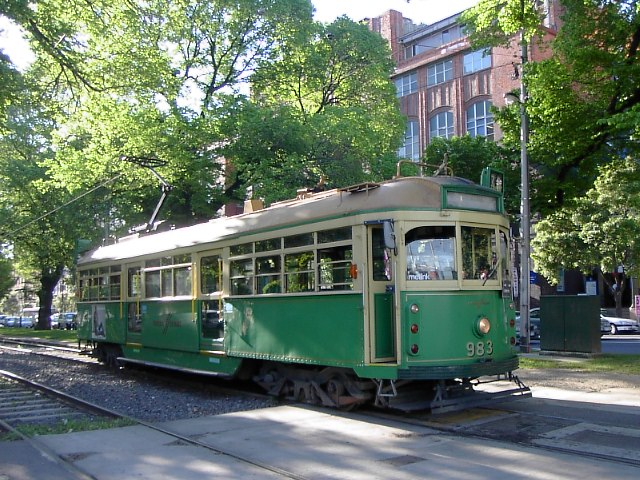
W6-class tram 983 on Victoria Parade, 2004

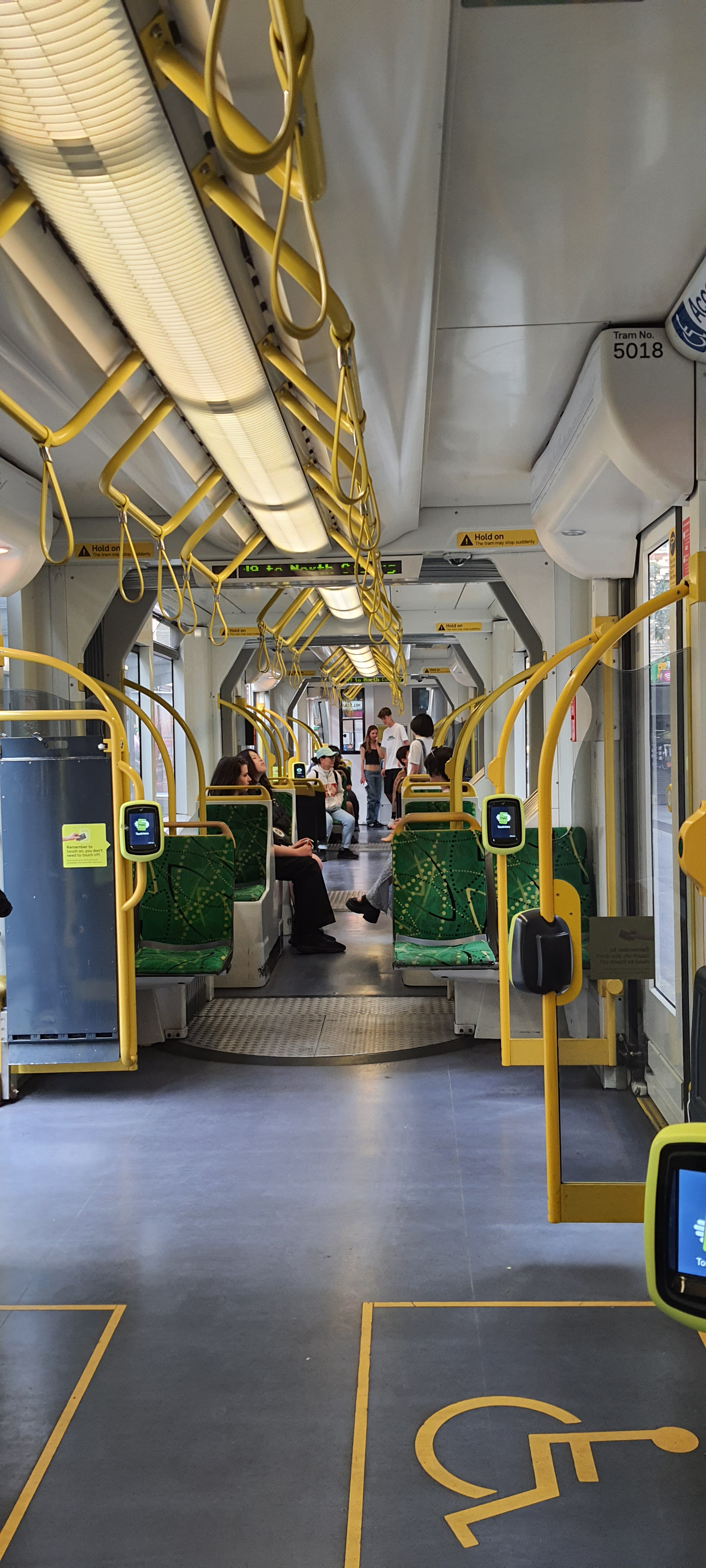
The interior of a D2-class tram, 2023

As of January 2019, the fleet consisted of over 450 W, Z3, A1, B2, C1, C2, D and E class trams, operated from eight depots.

In October 2001, Yarra Trams took delivery of the first of 36 C class Alstom Citadis trams which have primarily operated on route 109 to complement the extension to Box Hill. As part of the acquisition of M>Tram in 2004, Yarra Trams acquired 39 D class Siemens Combino trams and oversaw the delivery of another 20 still on order. They are leased from the Commonwealth Bank, rather than VicTrack.

Heritage W-class trams run solely on the City Circle tourist service. Due to these trams being limited to 40 km/h (24.9 mph) as a result of a series of modifications due to braking problems, their use is restricted to ensure limited interference with modern trams.

In 2003, Yarra Trams trialled a seating layout which became known as "Apollo". The trial involved removing 30 seats from a B-class tram and replacing the removed seats with "bum racks" which are found in Citadis trams. This resulted in a higher capacity for standing passengers on crowded services during peak hours. A further ten trams received the seating layout during refurbishment.

100 E-class trams were delivered by Bombardier Transportation, Dandenong, between 2013 and 2021.

100 Flexity 2 G-class trams are being manufactured by Alstom, Dandenong, and will be delivered starting from 2025. They will be 3 carriage long trams.

=== Ticketing ===
Yarra Trams run under the Public Transport Victoria banner, as do other operators of public transport franchises in metropolitan Melbourne, and use the myki ticketing system. Metcard tickets have not been accepted on trams since December 2012, and coin-only Metcard ticket machines and validators have been removed. Seats were installed in place of the ticket machines.

The entire tram network has now changed over to the myki smartcard fare collection system, with passengers needing to buy and top up a valid myki before boarding, or risk a fine of up to $238. Myki cards can be purchased from all staffed railway stations and retail outlets displaying a myki logo, including at all 7-Eleven convenience stores. They cannot be purchased or topped up on board a tram.

All tram routes operate entirely within zone 1. However, routes 75, 86 and 109 enter the zone 1/2 overlap at the very end of their outer-suburban routes. If a passenger begins and ends their journey completely within the zone 1/2 overlap, they can tap off to receive a slightly lower fare. If any part of the journey is within Zone 1, there is no need for the passenger to tap off as the fare is automatically calculated. Tapping off on a zone 1 journey is both redundant and may cause delay or inconvenience to other passengers and the tram networks 'on time' performance. If passengers only travel in the free tram zone, there is no need to tap on their myki.

=== Network expansion ===
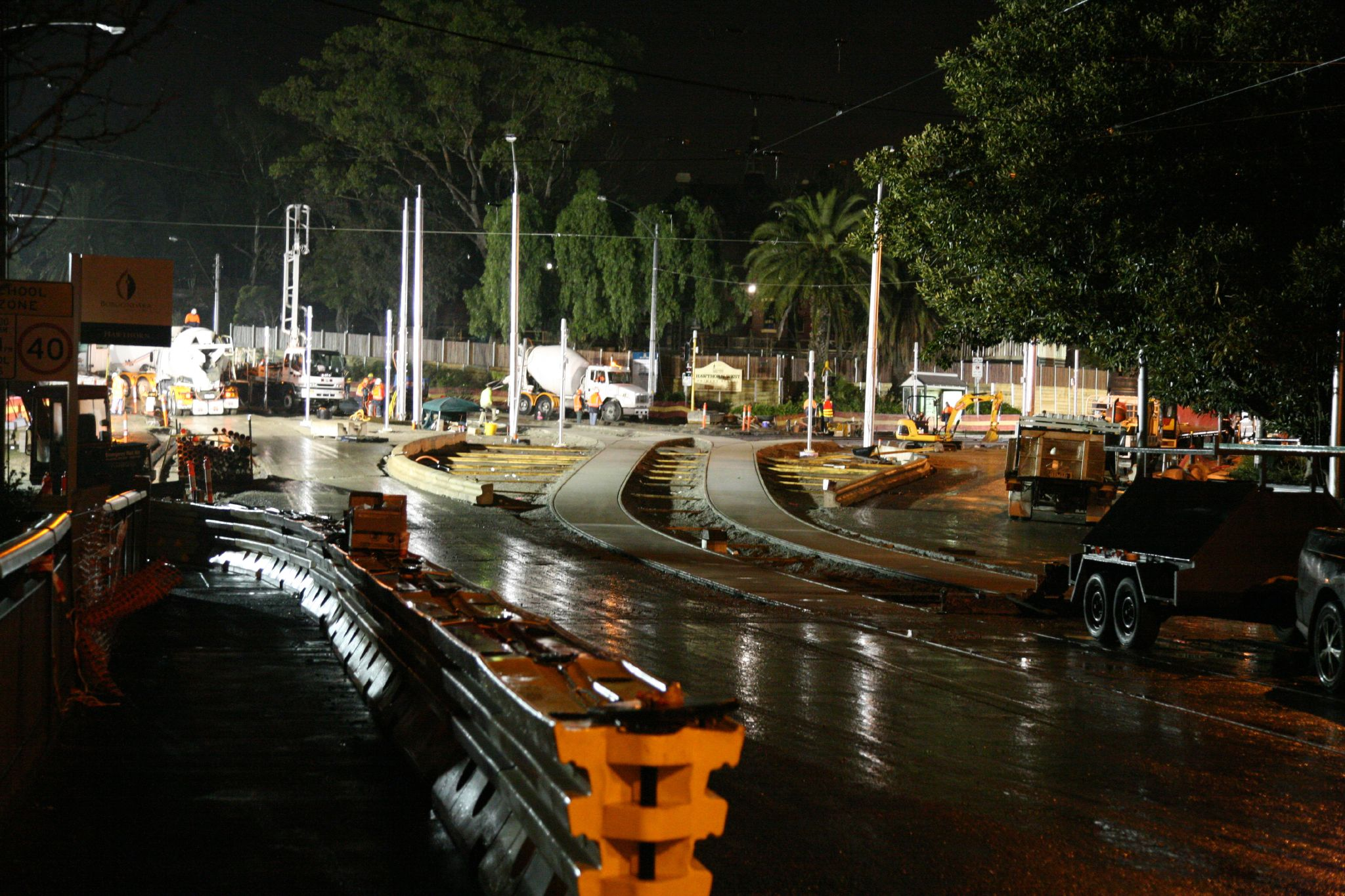
New platform stop under construction, 2006

Since privatisation, the tram network has grown in size as a result of a number of extensions. The accessibility of the network has also been improved, with 360 platform stops built as of January 2014.

In March 2000, services were extended to the new Melbourne Docklands precinct. Since then, a line connecting La Trobe and Flinders Streets via Docklands has been constructed as well as a further extension along Docklands Drive to NewQuay, which opened in January 2005. route 109 was extended 2.2 km (1.4 mi) from Mont Albert to Box Hill in May 2003. The extension to Box Hill has provided a direct link between Box Hill and suburbs such as Balwyn, Kew and Richmond.

In July 2005, a 3 km (1.9 mi) extension of route 75 from Burwood East to Vermont South opened.

In April 2018, the state government announced a new extension of the tram network from Caulfield. The 18 km (11.1 mi) extension would serve Chadstone, Monash University, Waverley Park and Rowville. The state government allocated $3 million to plan the route, which would be carried out in two stages.

=== Think Tram ===
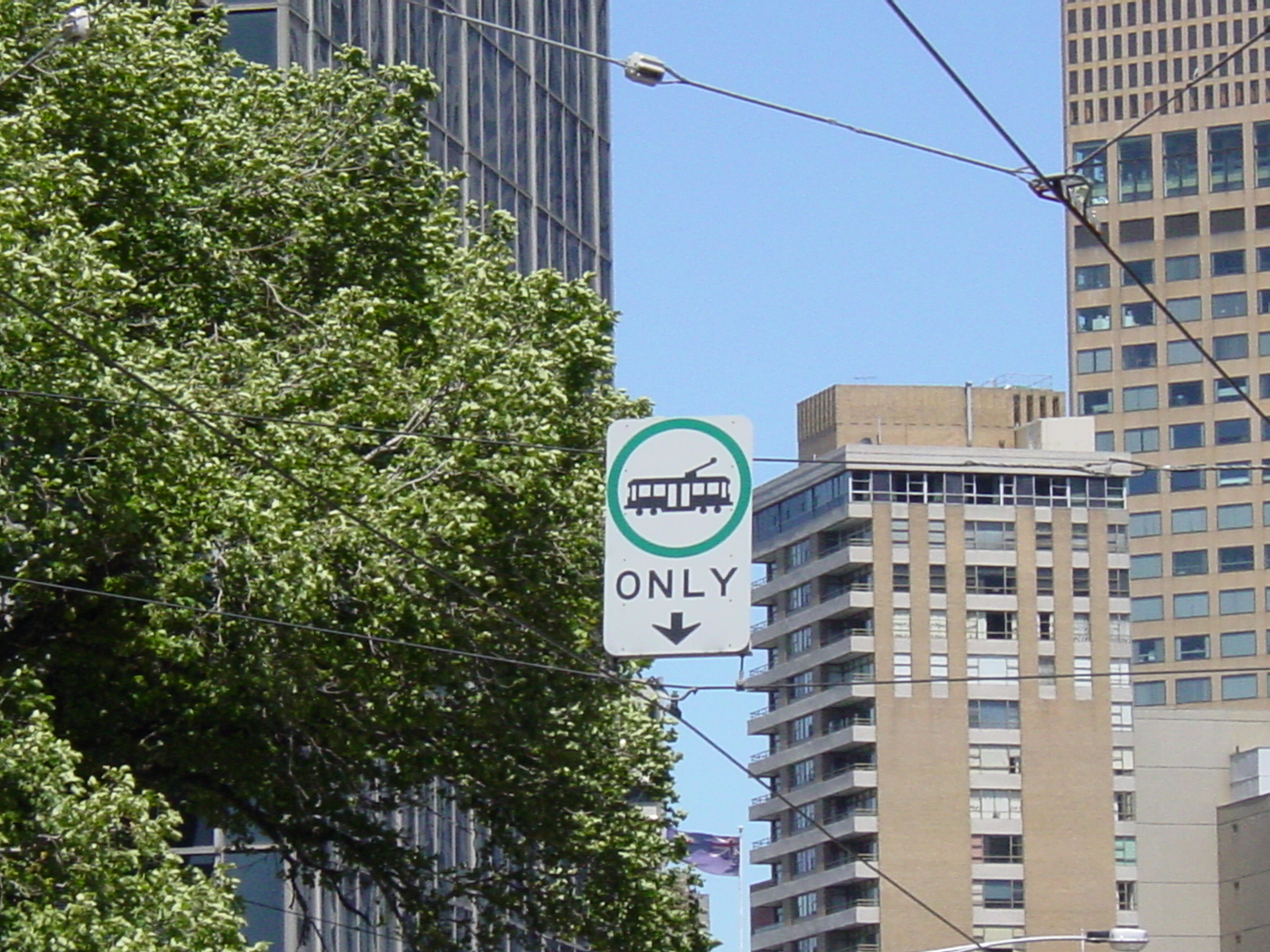
Tram-only lane sign, 2003

Yarra Trams is a partner in the Think Tram program with VicRoads, aimed at improving tram travel time and reliability. In conjunction with the Victorian government several initiatives are in place to enable trams to better meet punctuality targets. These include 'T-lights' which give trams priority at traffic signals, as well as part-time tram lanes and full-time tram lanes.

Part-time tram lanes are used often only during peak hours, with an example of this being on High Street along the route 6. Vehicles must not enter a part-time tram lane at any point during the nominated times except to avoid an obstruction, or perform a right turn; even then, vehicles must not proceed by law into the lane to do so unless they will not delay any approaching tram/s from either direction. The limit for staying in the lane to avoid an obstruction or turn right is 50 metres, at which point a vehicle must exit the lane entirely.

Full-time tram lanes often utilise raised curb dividers to physically prevent cars from straying onto tram tracks. Examples of these dividers can be seen on Spencer Street, Swanston Street in Carlton and Fitzroy Street in St Kilda. Vehicles must not enter a full-time tram lane at any time except to avoid an obstruction; even then, vehicles must not proceed by law into the lane to do so unless they will not delay any approaching tram/s from either direction. The limit for staying in the lane to avoid an obstruction is 50 metres, at which point a vehicle must exit the lane entirely. Some lanes only allow this to occur at certain points, or breaks, in the raised dividers. Crossing the raised dividers otherwise can cause severe damage to a vehicle.

=== Beware the Rhino ===
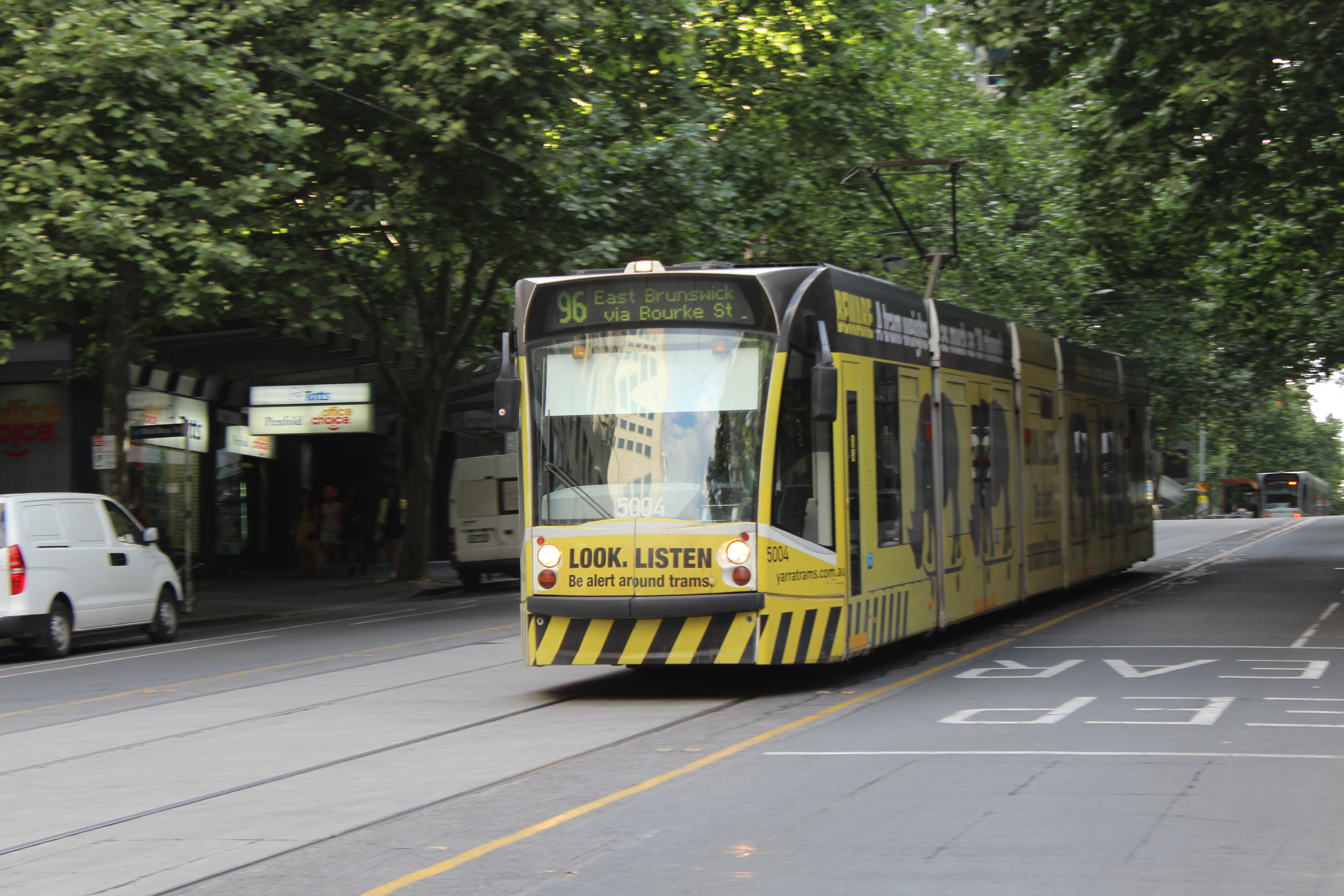
A D2-class tram promoting the "Beware the Rhino" campaign, 2012

In May 2011, Yarra Trams launched its "Beware The Rhino" safety campaign, aiming to increase awareness of the danger of tram traffic. It compared the hazard of a charging of rhinoceros to that of a tram, highlighting the peril that people put themselves in when they step into the path of a tram. The campaign won creativity awards, and was refocused in 2013.

== Legislation and governance ==
=== Transport Integration Act ===
The prime transport-related statute in Victoria is the Transport Integration Act 2010, which establishes the Department of Transport as the integration agency for Victoria's transport system. The Act also establishes and sets the charters of the state agencies charged with providing public transport rail services, namely the Public Transport Development Authority. The PTDA is empowered by the Transport Integration Act to contract transport operators to provide rail and bus services and has used those powers to contract Yarra Trams to provide tram services in Melbourne.

In addition, the Transport Integration Act establishes VicTrack which owns the public rail network and associated infrastructure. Another important statute is the Rail Management Act 1996 which confers powers on rail operators and provides for an access scheme for the state's rail network. The Transport (Compliance and Miscellaneous Act) 1983 is also a relevant statute relating to public transport and contains a number of offences relating to safety, ticketing and amenity.

=== Rail Safety Act ===
The safety of rail transport operations in Melbourne is regulated by the Rail Safety Act 2006 which applies to all commercial passenger operations. This Act establishes a framework containing safety duties for all rail industry participants and requires operators who manage infrastructure and rolling stock to obtain accreditation prior to commencing operations. Accredited operators are also required to have a safety management system to guide their operations. Sanctions applying to the safety scheme established under the Rail Safety Act are contained in the Transport (Compliance and Miscellaneous) Act 1983. The safety regulator for the rail system in Melbourne including trams is the Director, Transport Safety (trading as Transport Safety Victoria) whose office is established under the Transport Integration Act 2010.

Preceded by Public Transport Corporation	Trams in Melbourne (East/west CBD routes); 1999–2009	Succeeded by Incumbent
Preceded by M>Tram	Trams in Melbourne (North/south CBD routes); 2004–2009	Succeeded by Incumbent
