= TransdevTSL =

Australian public transport operator

- Industry: Transport
- Founded: August 1999
- Defunct: December 2010
- Fate: Dissolved
- Successor: Transdev Australia
- Area served: Sydney; Melbourne; Brisbane
- Products: Public transport
- Services: Bus, tram & ferry operator
- Parent: Transdev (50%); Transfield Services (50%)
- Website: www.transdevtsl.com.au

TransdevTSL, formerly MetroLink, was a 50/50 joint venture between the old Transdev and Transfield Services that operated trams in Melbourne, ferries in Brisbane and buses in Sydney. The joint venture was dissolved in December 2010 when Transfield Services sold its shares to Transdev. These three operations were the old Transdev's only Australian operations. Two of them would later be taken over by Veolia Transdev, formed from the merger of old Transdev and Veolia Transport in March 2011.

Veolia Transdev later formed another joint venture with Transfield Services called Harbour City Ferries, which operated ferries in Sydney since July 2012. The new Transdev (renamed from Veolia Transdev) bought Broadspectrum's (renamed from Transfield) share in December 2016.

== History ==
=== Shorelink Buses in Sydney ===
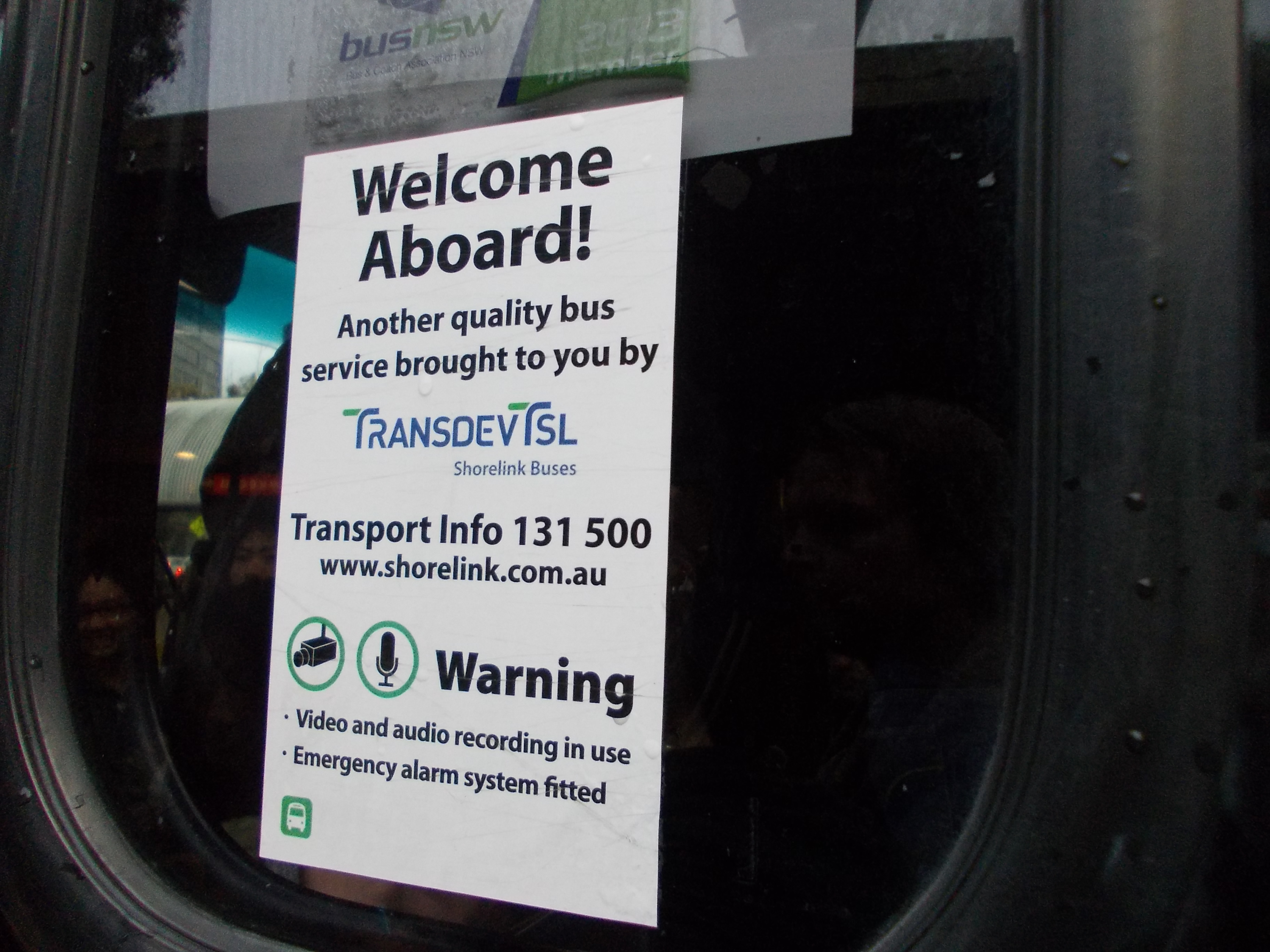
A bus sticker on a Shorelink bus showing the remnants of the TransdevTSL name in September 2014

In 2005 Transfield Services purchased a 50% interest in Transdev-owned Shorelink bus operation in Sydney. Rebranding on all buses took place in 2008 when Shorelink was renamed TransdevTSL Shorelink Buses. In December 2010 the joint venture was dissolved, with the company renamed Transdev Shorelink. The operations were absorbed into Transdev NSW in 2014.

=== Melbourne trams ===
In August 1999 MetroLink Victoria, a joint venture between Transfield Services (50%) Transdev (30%) and Egis (20%), commenced operating the Yarra Trams Melbourne tram franchise. Transdev bought out Egis' shareholding in 2000. In April 2004 it took over the M>Tram franchise from National Express resulting in it operating the entire Melbourne tram network. By 2007 it was part of the TransdevTSL group. TransdevTSL was shortlisted to bid for the franchise for renewal but lost to Keolis Downer who took over in November 2009.

=== Brisbane Ferries ===
In November 2003, Metrolink Queensland, a joint venture between Transfield and Transdev, was awarded a contract by the Brisbane City Council to operate the Brisbane Ferries service. The operation was renamed TransdevTSL Brisbane Ferries. In November 2010 this was extended for a further 10 years. The joint venture dissolved one month later. The ferry operation was rebranded Transdev Brisbane Ferries in July 2013.
