= M-Tram =

Tram system

M>Tram (Swanston Trams)

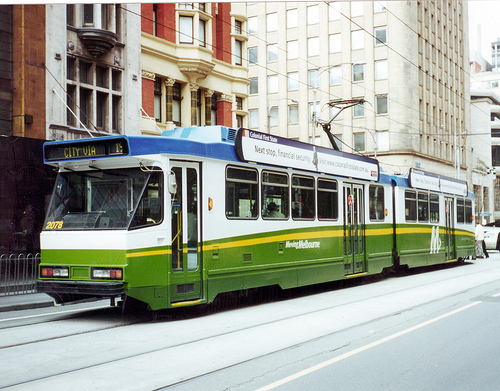
- B2 class tram on Elizabeth Street in 2001
- Formerly: Swanston Trams
- Industry: Tram operator
- Predecessor: Public Transport Corporation
- Founded: 1 July 1998
- Defunct: 18 April 2004
- Successor: Yarra Trams
- Headquarters: Melbourne, Australia
- Area served: Melbourne
- Parent: National Express Group
- Website: www.mtram.com.au

M>Tram was a tram operator in Melbourne, Australia. Formed in July 1998 as Swanston Trams, a business unit of the Public Transport Corporation, it was privatised in August 1999 becoming a subsidiary of National Express. In December 2002 National Express handed the franchise in, with the State Government taking over until negotiations were concluded for Yarra Trams to take over in April 2004.

== History ==
In October 1997, in preparation for privatisation, it was announced the Public Transport Corporation's tram operations were split into two business units, Swanston Trams and Yarra Trams. The split was effective on 1 July 1998.

National Express successfully bid to take over the Swanston Trams services from 29 August 1999. National Express were also awarded the Bayside Trains franchise and V/Line concession.

In October 2000, Swanston Trams was rebranded as M>Tram. After an attempted sale of the franchise to Yarra Trams failed, National Express handed back the franchise in December 2002, having been unable to renegotiate financial terms with the State Government.

KPMG were appointed to operate the business on behalf of the State Government. In May 2003 the State Government announced it would establish a single company to operate both networks, and was negotiating with Yarra Trams (who operated the other half of the network) to operate this entity. In February 2004 an agreement was reached, and the networks were reunited on 18 April 2004.

== Operations ==
The M>Tram network was focused on the north–south tram routes in Melbourne, running 17 routes along Swanston, Elizabeth and William Streets though the CBD and then into the suburbs as well as cross-suburban routes.

National Express inherited 30 W, 94 Z1, 12 Z2, 84 Z3 and 55 B2 class trams and took over the operation of four depots; Brunswick, Essendon, Glenhuntly and Malvern.

Part of the franchise agreement required replacement of older rolling stock with newer models, and refurbishment of the existing rolling stock. Siemens Combino trams were purchased as the D1 and D2 class, the first of 38 D1 three-car class trams entering service on 19 December 2002 and the first of 21 five-car D2 class trams on 3 March 2004. Z3 and B2 class trams were also internally refurbished by M>Tram, receiving green seat pads, and yellow stanchions and grab rails.

Preceded by Public Transport Corporation	Trams in Melbourne; North–south routes 1997–2002	Succeeded by State Government then TransdevTSL trading as Yarra Trams
