= Invergowrie (disambiguation) =

Invergowrie (/ˌɪnvərˈɡaʊri/) is a Scottish Gaelic name and may refer to:

== Places ==
- Invergowrie, a village in Perth and Kinross, Scotland
- Invergowrie, New South Wales, a locality in New South Wales, Australia

== Other ==
- Invergowrie (house), a heritage-listed former mansion in Melbourne, Victoria, Australia
- Invergowrie Lodge, a heritage-listed former gate house in Melbourne, Victoria, Australia
