= List of places on the Victorian Heritage Register in the City of Boroondara =

This is a list of places on the Victorian Heritage Register in the City of Boroondara in Victoria, Australia. The Victorian Heritage Register is maintained by the Heritage Council of Victoria.

As of September 2026, the Victorian Heritage Register listed the following 72 state-registered places within the City of Boroondara:

Place name	Place #	Location	Suburb or Town	Co-ordinates	Built	State registered	Photo
Alloarmo	H0552	5 Grattan St	Hawthorn	37°49′03″S 145°01′01″E	1856	22 June 1983	
Auburn Primary School (No. 2948)	H1707	51 Rathmines Rd	Hawthorn East	37°49′13″S 145°03′01″E	1889	20 August 1982	
Auburn railway station complex	H1559	99 Auburn Rd	Hawthorn East	37°49′21″S 145°02′46″E	1916	20 August 1982	
Auburn Uniting Church complex	H2034	81 Oxley Rd; 3 Hepburn St	Hawthorn	37°49′29″S 145°02′34″E	1888	10 July 2003	
Boroondara General Cemetery (also see other listings)	H0049	430–440 High St	Kew	37°48′12″S 145°02′38″E	1855	8 December 2005	
Robin Boyd House I (former)	H0879	664–666 Riversdale Rd	Camberwell	37°49′59″S 145°04′18″E	1951	2 October 1991	
Bridge Hotel, Hawthorn (former)	H0449	155 Church St	Hawthorn	37°49′07″S 145°01′06″E	1854	16 May 1979	
Broughton Hall	H1176	2 Berwick St	Camberwell	37°49′27″S 145°03′38″E	1858	18 April 1996	
Camberwell Courthouse and Police Station	H1194	311–317 Camberwell Rd	Camberwell	37°49′59″S 145°03′33″E	1938	25 July 1996	
Camberwell tram substation	H2324	30 Station St	Camberwell	37°49′50″S 145°03′29″E	1925	12 December 2013	
Canterbury Mansions	H0869	208 Canterbury Rd; 126 Malang Rd	Canterbury	37°49′28″S 145°04′59″E	1889	30 October 1991	
Cestria	H1924	521 Glenferrie Rd	Hawthorn	37°49′47″S 145°02′01″E	1891	9 August 2001	
Old Chandler Highway Bridge (former) (Note: Also listed on the VHR in the City of Yarra.)	H2354	Main Yarra Trail (Note: Built to carry rail, then used for road; pedestrian and cycle traffic only since 2019.) (Yarra River)	Kew	37°47′13″S 145°01′32″E	1840	30 June 2016	
Clemson House	H2006	24 Milfay Ave	Kew	37°48′18″S 145°01′09″E	1959	14 November 2002	
Colinton (Note: Extant house no longer retains the name "Colinton".)	H1399	92 Mont Albert Rd	Canterbury	37°49′02″S 145°04′07″E	1926	8 January 1998	
Cullymont	H0811	4 Selwyn St	Canterbury	37°49′48″S 145°05′01″E	1890	26 September 1990	
Cussen Memorial (in the Boroondara General Cemetery)	H2036	430–440 High St	Kew	37°48′12″S 145°02′35″E	1912	13 November 2003	
D'Estaville	H0201	7 Barry St	Kew	37°48′14″S 145°01′35″E	1859	9 October 1974	
Dights Mill site (Note: Also listed on the VHR in the City of Yarra.)	H1522	Off Yarra Blvde	Kew	37°47′49″S 145°00′04″E	c. 1839	20 August 1982	
Emulation Hall	H2298	3 Rochester Rd	Canterbury	37°49′23″S 145°04′52″E	1928	8 March 2012	
ES&A Bank, Hawthorn (former) (Manresa People's Centre)	H0516	343 Burwood Rd	Hawthorn	37°49′19″S 145°02′06″E	1873	5 May 1982	
ES&A Bank, Hawthorn East (former)	H0534	482 Riversdale Rd	Hawthorn East	37°49′53″S 145°03′23″E	1885	14 July 1982	
Eyre Court	H0817	2 Molesworth St	Canterbury	37°49′48″S 145°05′00″E	1890	26 September 1990	
Frognall	H0707	54 Mont Albert Rd	Canterbury	37°49′02″S 145°03′50″E	1891	5 October 1988	
Genazzano FCJ College (Wardell Building)	H1902	285–315 Cotham Rd	Kew	37°48′30″S 145°3′21″E	1889	9 November 2000	
Glenferrie Oval; Grandstand	H0890	34 Linda Cres	Hawthorn	37°49′14″S 145°1′58″E	1938	30 September 1992	
Glenferrie Primary School (Primary School No. 1508)	H1630	78–98 Manningtree Rd	Hawthorn	37°49′27″S 145°02′02″E	1877	20 August 1982	
Glenferrie railway station complex	H1671	662–668 Glenferrie Rd	Hawthorn	37°49′18″S 145°02′12″E	1916	20 August 1982	
Grace Park House	H0730	19 Chrystobel Cres	Hawthorn	37°49′06″S 145°01′59″E	1858	3 May 1989	
Hawthorn Bridge (Note: Also listed on the VHR in the City of Yarra.)	H0050	Burwood Rd (Yarra River)	Hawthorn	37°49′12.4″S 145°0′55″E	1861	8 September 2005	
Hawthorn Fire Station (former)	H1327	66–68 William St	Hawthorn	37°49′21″S 145°02′22″E	1910	14 August 1997	
Hawthorn Motor Garage (former)	H2296	735 Glenferrie Rd	Hawthorn	37°49′06″S 145°02′09″E	1912	10 May 2012	
Hawthorn railway station complex	H1566	54 Burwood Rd	Hawthorn	37°49′19″S 145°01′22″E	1861	20 August 1982	
Hawthorn Tramways; Trust Depot (former)	H0876	8 Wallen Rd	Hawthorn	37°49′39″S 145°01′29″E	1916	15 December 1994	
including: Electric Tram No. 13	H2147	8 Wallen Rd	Hawthorn	37°49′39″S 145°01′29″E	1906	14 February 2008	
Hoddle survey tree, Kew Golf Club	H2340	120B Belford Rd	Kew East	37°47′19″S 145°02′57″E	n/a	9 October 2014	
Invergowrie	H0195	21 Coppin Gr	Hawthorn	37°49′20″S 145°01′05″E	1857	9 October 1974	
Invergowrie Lodge (former)	H0517	8 Palmer Pl	Hawthorn	37°49′14″S 145°01′02″E	c. 1871	5 May 1982	
Jeffries house	H0461	7 Warwick Ave	Surrey Hills	37°49′44″S 145°05′53″E	1924	5 March 1980	
Kawarau (former) (now Alia College)	H0489	405 Tooronga Rd	Hawthorn East	37°50′35″S 145°02′42″E	1893	4 March 1981	
Kew Cottages (former) (Kew Residential Services)	H2073	Main Dr	Kew	37°47′51″S 145°1′36″E	1886	25 November 2004	
Kew Police Station and Court House (former)	H0944	188 High St	Kew	37°48′24″S 145°01′55″E	1888	20 August 1992	(Note: The former police station and court house may be glimpsed, far left, in the image of the adjacent former post office and nearby war memorial.)
Kew Post Office (former)	H0885	186 High St	Kew	37°48′24″S 145°01′53″E	1888	28 August 1991	
Kew War Memorial	H2035	High St; Cotham Rd	Kew	37°48′24″S 145°01′52″E	1925	13 May 2004	
Maternal and Child Health Centre	H0055	21 Strathalbyn St	Kew East	37°47′53″S 145°03′02″E	1925	8 September 2005	
Oxford	H0196	21 Isabella Gr	Hawthorn	37°49′15″S 145°01′09″E	1888	9 October 1974	
Parlington	H0731	46 Parlington St	Canterbury	37°49′01″S 145°03′44″E	c. 1888	12 April 1989	
Preshil School Junior campus	H0072	395 Barkers Rd	Kew	37°48′57″S 145°03′08″E	1962–1975	13 October 2005	
Raheen	H0515	96 Studley Park Rd	Kew	37°48′19″S 145°01′00″E	1870	14 July 1982	
River House	H2455	2 Hodgson St	Kew	37°48′36″S 145°00′58″E	1953	19 December 2024	
Rivoli Theatre	H1524	200 Camberwell Rd	Hawthorn East	37°49′50″S 145°03′19″E	1940	10 February 2005	
Robert Cochrane Kindergarten	H2309	2A Minima St	Hawthorn	37°49′26″S 145°02′29″E	1950	14 February 2013	
Ross House	H0202	292 Cotham Rd	Kew	37°48′34″S 145°03′04″E	1889	9 October 1974	
Rotha	H0510	29 Harcourt St	Hawthorn East	37°49′04″S 145°03′04″E	1888	5 May 1982	
Second Church of Christ, Scientist (former)	H1196	41 Cookson St	Camberwell	37°49′33″S 145°03′35″E	1937	25 July 1996	
Shenton	H0788	41 Kinkora Rd	Hawthorn	37°48′59″S 145°02′03″E	1890	20 August 1982	
Shrublands	H2037	16 Balwyn Rd	Canterbury	37°49′17″S 145°04′48″E	1863	11 September 2003	
Springthorpe Memorial (in the Boroondara General Cemetery)	H0522	430–440 High St	Kew	37°48′12″S 145°2′31″E	1901	7 April 1982	
St Faith's Anglican Church	H2254	8 Charles St	Glen Iris	37°51′02″S 145°05′28″E	1957	14 October 2010	
St Mark's Anglican Church	H2158	1 Canterbury Rd	Camberwell	37°49′16″S 145°03′33″E	1928	8 May 2008	
Studley House (Wren House); (part of Xavier College, Burke Hall campus)	H0789	2 Nolan Ave	Kew	37°48′20″S 145°00′45″E	1850	8 August 1990	
Talana	H2382	1 Harcourt St	Hawthorn	37°49′03″S 145°02′47″E	1899	20 June 2019	
Tay Creggan (campus of Strathcona Baptist Girls Grammar School)	H2210	30 Yarra St	Hawthorn	37°49′29″S 145°01′09″E	1893	11 June 2009	
The Hawthorns	H0457	5 Creswick St	Hawthorn	37°48′56″S 145°01′02″E	1852	3 October 1979	
Tram Verandah Shelter	H0173	Cotham Rd and Burke Rd	Kew	37°48′37″S 145°03′38″E	1913	14 September 2006	
Victoria Bridge (Note: Also listed on the VHR in the City of Yarra.)	H0374	Barkers Rd (Yarra River)	Kew	37°48′44″S 145°0′55″E	1890	14 June 2007	
Villa Alba	H0605	44 Walmer St	Kew	37°48′18″S 145°00′40″E	1884	20 August 1982	
Wallen Road Bridge (Note: Also listed on the VHR in the City of Yarra.)	H0380	Wallen Rd (Yarra River)	Hawthorn	37°49′12″S 145°0′55″E	1881	14 June 2007	
Walmer Street Bridge (Note: Also listed on the VHR in the City of Yarra.)	H2401	Walmer St (Yarra River)	Kew	37°48′38″S 145°00′36″E	1891	7 January 2021	
Willsmere Hospital (former)	H0861	258 Wiltshire Dr; 21 Vaughan Cres	Kew	37°47′42″S 145°01′25″E	1864	20 August 1982	
Xavier College (South Wing, the West Wing, the Great Hall and the Chapel)	H0893	135 Barkers Rd	Kew	37°48′42″S 145°02′02″E	1889	2 October 1991	
Zetland	H0477	16 Yarra St	Hawthorn	37°49′22″S 145°01′12″E	1874	3 September 1980	
