= Zetland =

Zetland may refer to:

== Places ==
- Zetland, New South Wales, a suburb of Sydney, Australia
- An archaic spelling of Shetland

== Other ==
- Zetland (house), a heritage-listed house in Melbourne, Victoria, Australia
- Zetland (lifeboat), the oldest surviving lifeboat in the world
- Zetland (newspaper), a Danish online newspaper
- HMS Zetland (L59), a British Royal Navy ship
- Marquess of Zetland, a title in the British Peerage
- The Zetland, a hotel in Middlesbrough, England
- A type of zebroid that is a hybrid cross between a male zebra and a female Shetland pony
