= Broughton Hall =

Broughton Hall may refer to:

In Australia

- Broughton Hall, Camberwell, a heritage-listed former mansion in Melbourne, Victoria
- Broughton Hall, Lilyfield, a heritage-listed former hospital in Sydney, New South Wales

In the United Kingdom

- Broughton Hall, Flintshire
- Broughton Hall, Merseyside
- Broughton Hall, North Yorkshire
- Broughton Hall, Staffordshire
