= Auburn Uniting Church =

Heritage-listed church in Melbourne, Victoria, Australia

- "Hawthorn Circuit"
- The exterior of the church

- Location of the house in Greater Metropolitan Melbourne
- Auburn Uniting Church
- 37°49′29″S 145°02′34″E
- Location: 81 Oxley Road, Hawthorn, City of Boroondara, Melbourne, Victoria
- Country: Australia
- Denomination: Uniting
- Previous denomination: Wesleyan Methodists (1888–1902); Methodist Church of Australasia (1902–1977)
- Website: auburnuc.org.au

History
- Former name(s): Wesleyan Methodist Church, Hawthorn
- Status: Parish church
- Founded: 1853

Architecture
- Functional status: Active
- Architect: Alfred Dunn
- Architectural type: Church
- Style: Lombardic Victorian Romanesque Revival
- Years built: 1888–1890
- Completed: 1890; 136 years ago
- Construction cost: £13,000

Specifications
- Materials: Dichromatic bricks; slate; stucco; stained glass

Administration
- Division: Synod of Victoria and Tasmania

Victorian Heritage Register
- Official name: Auburn Uniting Church Complex
- Type: Registered place; Registered object integral to a registered place
- Designated: 10 July 2003
- Reference no.: H2034
- Heritage overlay no.: HO209
- Category: Religion

Register of the National Estate
- Official name: Auburn Uniting Church Complex
- Type: Defunct register
- Designated: 28 October 2003
- Reference no.: 102040

The Auburn Uniting Church is a Uniting church, located at 81 Oxley Road, on the corner of Hepburn Street, in Hawthorn, in the City of Boroondara, in the inner suburbs of Melbourne, in Victoria, Australia.

Built by the Wesleyan Methodists between 1888 and 1890 on the traditional lands of the Wurundjeri people, the church was added to the Victorian Heritage Register on 10 July 2003 in recognition of its historical and architectural significance; and was also added to non-statutory lists by the Victorian branch of the National Trust on 5 March 1987 and the now defunct Register of the National Estate on 28 October 2003.

== History ==
Wesleyan Methodism was one of the flourishing denominations of the Hawthorn municipality in the second half of the nineteenth century. The local Methodist community was known as the "Hawthorn Circuit" and such was its influence that it was responsible for the establishment in 1881 of the Methodist Ladies' College (MLC), one of Melbourne's leading secondary schools for girls.

Between the 1840s and 1880s the Hawthorn Circuit occupied and subsequently outgrew a number of buildings until in 1886 a new, considerably larger, site was selected on the corner of Oxley Road and Hepburn Street.

The Trustees advertised in The Argus, inviting 'competitive designs for church, school and parsonage' on the new site. The successful design was submitted by talented young Melbourne architect Alfred Dunn, who designed a number of churches for the Wesleyans. Construction of the complex took less than two years and was completed in 1890, at a cost of £13,000. Dunn died at the age of 29, only a few years after the Auburn complex was finished.

In 1902 the Wesleyan Methodists became part of the Methodist Church of Australasia, which in turn combined with the Congregationalists and Presbyterians in 1977 to become the Uniting Church in Australia. Since that date the church has been known as the Auburn Uniting Church.

== Description ==
The complex consists of a comprises the main church building, a church hall (Sunday School), a manse, caretaker's cottage and garage (formerly stables). The church occupies a prominent corner block at the crest of what was known as Hepburn's Hill, now the corner of Oxley Road and Hepburn Street, Hawthorn. While the main entrance of the church opens on to Oxley Road, the hall has its main entrance on Hepburn Street, addressing the corner of Hepburn Street and Minona Street. The manse fronts Oxley Road, with rear access from Edlington Street; the cottage fronts Hepburn Street, with side access from Duffy Place.

=== Church building ===
The main church building is constructed in the Lombardic Victorian Romanesque Revival style. The predominant theme is the use of banded, dichromatic brickwork of Hawthorn browns contrasted with deep reds. The dominant element of the church is its multi-levelled tower, which addresses the corner of Oxley Road and Hepburn Street.

The tower rises in five main stages from a stone plinth. The lower three levels reflect the square shape of the tower in solid brick, each level with a different window theme. The lower level has steps leading up to an arched doorway on the Hepburn Street (east) elevation, with a dichrome brick arch above the doorway supported by stuccoed colonnettes. This doorway is complemented on the south and north elevations of the tower by windows rendered in the same style, with the colonnettes prominent. The windows on the second level also feature the stucco colonnettes on three sides, with the fourth side adjoining the church building and hence the window is omitted. A straight band of dichrome brickwork runs along the four corners of the tower, from levels two to four. The third floor tower walls are punctuated only by pairs of thin lancet windows on each elevation. The top of this level tapers inwards as if to form the pinnacle, but which forms instead the base for the fourth level. This fourth level transforms the predominant geometry of the tower from square to round, whereby rounded corner columns in banded red and brown brick form the basis of an open brick arcade on each elevation, supported by light colonnettes. Forming the fifth level is the pyramidal roof, at the pinnacle of which is attached a tall metal finial. At the base of the roof are triangular gables.

The main part of this church building follows a general cruciform plan, broken by the prominent corner tower. It is two storeys high with a slate roof and prominent gables facing each of the main street elevations, with balconies denoting the first floor. The main entry on Oxley Road is a central colonnaded entryway supporting a decorated stucco pediment below the main gabled facade. Above the pediment is decorative archway, featuring an arcade on the lower level and three circular recesses on the upper, above which the arch is accented by typical red and brown brickwork. The main gabled entry is flanked either side by smaller gabled arches. The main gable is surmounted by a modest acroterion. The tiled, gabled roof behind this point features a small turret, which acted as ventilation when the interior of the church was lit by gas, with a pyramid roof and small finial.

The side elevation features a large transept window over two stages. Internally, many original and authentic fittings remain, within a lavish decorative scheme, framed by large decorated pilasters, arched, stained glass windows and a large network of organ pipes to the rear of the sanctuary. The church organ was constructed by George Fincham, a prolific organ builder of the second half of the nineteenth century. The organ has been in continuous use since its inauguration in 1889. Originally two manuals, it was extended to three manuals and converted to electric action in 1867. The interior of the church also creates an important space ideally designed for worship, also acoustically and visually complementing the Fincham organ.

The pipe organ

=== Other structures ===
The manse, hall, cottage and stables all feature the same dichrome brickwork patterns and Romanesque style but display a far more conservative design approach. The manse is a two-storey building in a cruciform plan featuring gabled facades and windows accented by stuccoed arches. The front garden of the manse is believed to retain much of its original content and layout. The hall, stables and caretaker's residence are all plain in design but are superbly complementary to the main church and manse. The church complex is believed to be rare in that it contains a complete, intact and authentic set of church buildings that were built simultaneously (within 18-24 months of each other), whereas, historically, most such complexes have been constructed over long periods of time, evolving with the congregation's needs.

=== Architectural significance ===
The church complex is significant as the finest example of Lombardic Romanesque church design in Australia. The church was hailed contemporarily as one of the finest Wesleyan churches in Victoria, and was described by Miles Lewis, in his 1991 monograph Victorian Churches as a "…veritable cathedral of Victorian Wesleyanism, in which the brilliant young architect Alfred Dunn reinterpreted the Lombardic design of the Independent Church, Collins Street, in American Romanesque and using deep red and brown brickwork…" The church building is architecturally significant as the greatest work of Dunn's brief career, and probably the most visually striking Wesleyan Methodist Church in Victoria.

== See also ==
- Architecture of Melbourne
- List of places on the Victorian Heritage Register in the City of Boroondara
