= Grace Park House =

Heritage-listed house in Melbourne, Victoria, Australia

- Location of the house in Greater Metropolitan Melbourne
- Etymology: Julia Lynch (née Grace)

General information
- Status: Completed
- Type: House
- Architectural style: Old Colonial Georgian
- Location: 19 Chrystobel Crescent, Hawthorn, City of Boroondara, Melbourne, Victoria, Australia
- Coordinates: 37°49′06″S 145°01′59″E
- Completed: 1858; 168 years ago
- Renovated: 1870s; 1890s; 2015
- Client: Michael and Julia Lynch

Technical details
- Material: Bluestone; stucco; timber
- Grounds: 37 ha (92 acres) (in 1857); 2,652 m^{2} (28,550 sq ft) (in 2016)

Design and construction
- Architect: John Gill

Renovating team
- Architect: Rosstang Architects (2015)

Victorian Heritage Register
- Official name: Grace Park House
- Type: Registered place
- Designated: 3 May 1989
- Reference no.: VHR H0730
- Heritage overlay no.: HO30
- Categories: Education; Residential buildings (private); Transient Accommodation

Register of the National Estate
- Official name: Grace Park Estate
- Type: Defunct register
- Designated: 21 March 1978
- Reference no.: 5661

The Grace Park House is a house and former school building, located at 19 Chrystobel Crescent in Hawthorn, in the City of Boroondara, in the inner eastern suburbs of Melbourne, in Victoria, Australia.

Built in 1858 on the traditional lands of the Wurundjeri people, the house was added to the Victorian Heritage Register on 3 May 1989 in recognition of its historical and architectural significance; and was also added to non-statutory lists by the Victorian branch of the National Trust on 1 May 1967 and the now defunct Register of the National Estate on 21 March 1978.

== History ==
Michael Lynch, an Irish-born publican, purchased approximately 37 hectares (92 acres) in Colonial government land sales between 1846 and 1848; bounded by Burwood Road, Power Street, Glenferrie Road, and what is now the north side of Mary Street in Hawthorn. Lynch was one of the few original purchasers of land to remain in the district. Lynch and his wife, Julia, demolished an earlier structure on the site, built prior to 1852, and commissioned John Gill, a prominent architect, to design the first section of the house later known as Grace Park House which was built from 1857. Grace Park House was extended in the early 1870s; and subsequent alterations and extensions occurred in the early 1890s, after the house was converted to the Grace Park Ladies' College.

Michael Lynch died in October 1871, and his wife, Julia, became the owner/occupier of the house that, at the time, was set on one hectare (three acres). The house was subsequently occupied by Mrs Robert Colvin Clark, as the Grace Park Ladies' College in 1874. Lynch's son, Michael, was gifted the property, to be retained in perpetuity. However, the family decided to sell land to Victorian Railways in 1882 when the railway line was extended from Burnley, across the Yarra River to Hawthorn and then through to Camberwell stations. The remaining property was then leased to the Grace Park Leasehold Syndicate for fifty years, headed by Henry Byron Moore. The syndicate soon subdivided the estate into three hundred residential lots to form Serpentine Street and the Grace Park Estate. The leasehold lots were slow to sell and Moore became insolvent in 1891. There followed a series of convoluted lease arrangements until, in 1904, when the Settled Lands Act made sales possible.

Developed in the late-nineteenth and early-twentieth centuries, the Grace Park Estate has some grand Victorian-style homes, and more in the Edwardian style, on unusual curving crescents and parkland along the old train route to Kew.

Sold by Richard Wilson in 2010 for c.A$9 million; the house was extensively restored and renovated in 2015 with the addition of contemporary features; and the following year, set on 2,652 square metres (28,550 sq ft), the six-bedroom two-storey house was sold for A$14.825 million.

== Description ==
The Grace Park House, constructed in the Old Colonial Georgian style, is stucco and comprises two storeys. It features shuttered french doors opening onto a double-storey timber-framed verandah. It is an important example of the Colonial architect John Gill's work. The house is also important because of its ability to exhibit, by its symmetrical proportions, the aesthetic characteristics of the Old Colonial Georgian style. Grace Park House is historically important because of its association, through Michael Lynch, a well known early Melbourne citizen and an early settler in Hawthorn, and illustrated the opportunities available to the early settlers of the District of Port Phillip. The 1890s additions and alterations, commissioned when the house accommodated the Grace Park Ladies' College, are historically important for their association with the rise of private educational facilities for girls in the Colony and the emergence of an upper middle class.

The Grace Park House is one of the earliest surviving houses in the Hawthorn area and is of architectural consequence as a rare example of the symmetrical, Georgian style houses of the period. Although in a run down state externally, the shuttered French doors and the squat bluestone columns supporting the verandah posts are features of note. In 1978, the house was externally quite intact and structurally sound but decrepit in appearance. The verandah was in fair condition and the posts may not have been original.

== See also ==
- Architecture of Melbourne
- List of places on the Victorian Heritage Register in the City of Boroondara
