= Bridge Hotel, Hawthorn =

Heritage-listed former hotel, now house, in Melbourne, Victoria, Australia

Bridge Hotel (former)
- Location of the former hotel, now house, in Greater Metropolitan Melbourne

General information
- Status: Completed
- Type: Hotel (1854–1866); House (since 1866)
- Architectural style: Victorian Classical and Gothic
- Location: 155 Church Street, Hawthorn, City of Boroondara, Melbourne, Victoria, Australia
- Coordinates: 37°49′07″S 145°01′06″E
- Completed: 1854; 172 years ago
- Client: James Connell

Technical details
- Material: Bluestone; stuccoed brick; corrugated iron; timber
- Grounds: 840 m^{2} (9,000 sq ft)

Victorian Heritage Register
- Official name: Former Bridge Hotel
- Type: Registered place
- Designated: 16 May 1979
- Reference no.: VHR H0449
- Heritage overlay no.: HO32
- Categories: Residential buildings (private); Commercial

Register of the National Estate
- Official name: Bridge Hotel (former)
- Type: Defunct register
- Designated: 21 October 1980
- Reference no.: 5655

The Bridge Hotel, and at one stage called the Bowling Green Hotel, was a hotel for a short period and then converted into a house, since 1866, located at 155 Church Street in Hawthorn, in the City of Boroondara, in the inner eastern suburbs of Melbourne, in Victoria, Australia.

Built as a hotel in 1854 on the traditional lands of the Wurundjeri people, the building was added to the Victorian Heritage Register on 16 May 1979 in recognition of its historical and architectural significance; and was also added to non-statutory lists by the Victorian branch of the National Trust on 21 April 1976 and the now defunct Register of the National Estate on 21 October 1980.

== Description ==
The former Bridge Hotel, a two-storey stuccoed-brick building, was constructed in about 1854 for the publican James Connell, one of Hawthorn's early settlers. Subsequently called the Bowling Green Hotel, it was converted to a private residence in 1866. The building incorporates a variety of styles including the Victorian Classical and Gothic. The building was built on bluestone footings, with a corrugated iron hipped roof, a detailed porch that faces the main facade, which has sash windows, string courses and a parapet. The buttresses and timber verandah are unusual features.

The former Bridge Hotel is important because of its association with the early settlement patterns of Hawthorn, one of Melbourne's rural outposts in the middle of the nineteenth century. Built in response to the construction of a timber bridge over the Yarra River in 1851, the former hotel illustrates early settlement patterns in the Village of Hawthorn prior to the arrival of the railway in 1861, and the movement of commercial interests closer to the station. The former hotel, which externally exhibits the principal characteristics of an 1850s public house, is important in demonstrating early Colonial hotel design and construction methods.

The renovated house with modern amenities sold in March 2024 for c.A$3 million. As of 2026, the four-bedroom two-storey house was leased, set on 840 square metres (9,000 sq ft), described as having an elegant mahogany and cast iron staircase, a living room with bay window that overlooked a private garden, a large dining room, study, and open-plan kitchen and dining area, with modern appliances. Two large outdoor precincts, grassed, paved, and with decking surrounded the rear of the house. Upstairs, the bedrooms included a walk-in dressing room with ensuite, and there was an additional bathroom and lounge room.

== See also ==
- Architecture of Melbourne
- List of places on the Victorian Heritage Register in the City of Boroondara
