= St Mark's Anglican Church, Camberwell =

Heritage-listed church building in Melbourne, Victoria, Australia

St Mark's Anglican Church
- St Mark's Camberwell
- Location of the church in Greater Metropolitan Melbourne
- St Mark's Anglican Church
- 37°49′16″S 145°03′33″E
- Location: 1 Canterbury Road, Camberwell, City of Boroondara, Melbourne, Victoria
- Country: Australia
- Denomination: Anglican
- Website: stmarkscamberwell.org.au

History
- Status: Parish church
- Founded: 1912 (as a parish)
- Founder: Rev. H. A. Brooksbank
- Dedication: Mark the Evangelist

Architecture
- Functional status: Active
- Architect: Rodney Alsop
- Architectural type: Church
- Style: Federation Arts and Crafts
- Years built: 1927–1928; 1942; 1963
- Groundbreaking: 10 September 1927
- Completed: 21 July 1928; 98 years ago

Specifications
- Capacity: 600 worshippers
- Length: 42.21 m (138 ft 6 in)
- Width: 19 m (62 ft)
- Materials: Bricks; stucco; stained glass; reclaimed sandstone

Administration
- Province: Victoria
- Diocese: Melbourne

Clergy
- Vicar: Rev. Tim Collison

Victorian Heritage Register
- Official name: St Mark's Anglican Church
- Type: Registered place
- Designated: 8 May 2008
- Reference no.: H2158
- Heritage overlay no.: HO483
- Category: Religion

St Mark's Anglican Church, also known as St Mark's Camberwell, is an Anglican church building, located at 1 Canterbury Road in Camberwell, in the City of Boroondara, in the inner suburbs of Melbourne, in Victoria, Australia.

The parish was established in 1912; and the church was built in stages, from 1927, designed by Rodney Alsop, on the traditional lands of the Bunurong people. It contains a large and well executed collection of stained glass windows by Napier and Christian Waller, Joseph Stansfield, Sir Ninian Comper, and other local artists, a war memorial chapel, and an organ by prominent local firm, George Fincham & Sons.

The church building was added to the Victorian Heritage Register on 8 May 2008 in recognition of its aesthetic, historical, and social significance; and was also added to a non-statutory list by the Victorian branch of the National Trust on 27 June 1989.

The vicar, since February 2023, is Rev. Tim Collison.

== History ==
The parish of St Mark's was established in 1912, and the 1914 church hall, designed by Louis R. Williams and Alexander North, held all church activities for the next fourteen years. This church hall was renamed the Brooksbank Hall in 1965, after H. A. Brooksbank, the first Reverend at St Mark's, and contributes to an understanding of the continued use of the site.

The current church building was built between 1927 and 1928, designed by noted architect Rodney Alsop, who was significant to the Arts and Crafts movement in Victoria, and is seen as one of its best practitioners. The imposing Gothic design, influenced by the architect's involvement in the Arts and Crafts movement, was intended to take advantage of the 'most commanding site in the Diocese'. Alsop was better known for his domestic designs and the Footscray Park and in 1932 his design of the Winthrop Hall in the Hackett Buildings at The University of Western Australia was awarded the bronze medal by the Royal Institute of British Architects. St Mark's is his only known church design.

The foundation stone was laid on 10 September 1927 and the church building officially opened on 21 July 1928. With the post-World War I war memorial movement at its peak in the 1920s, a key feature of the planning of St Mark's was the inclusion of a war memorial within the church building. The Chapel of St George was dedicated to the memory of 'The Men of the Parish who gave their lives in the Great War' on Armistice Day, November 1928.

The George Fincham & Sons organ was installed in June 1928, enlarged to three manuals by the same firm in 1951, and further rebuilt in 1990 by Australian Pipe Organs Pty Ltd.

St Mark's was completed during the one construction period and the building has not since had alterations or additions.

== Description ==
The design of St Mark's includes an elegant broach spire, and use of stucco rendering and minimal ornamentation. There are interesting internal aspects, including the octagonal baptistery and the placing of the square chancel behind the altar. The chancel, sanctuary, and chapel are lined with sandstone reclaimed from the former National Bank of Australia in Collins Street, Melbourne. The church is 42.21 metres (138 ft 6 in) long and 19 metres (62 ft) wide and incorporates a nave of seven bays with lofty clerestory and passage aisles, an elevated chancel and sanctuary; the apse of the latter ingeniously accommodated within a square east end.

=== Stained glass windows ===
The collection of stained glass at St Mark's dates from the mid-twentieth century. M. Napier Waller's The Transfiguration, considered one of his best stained glass works, was installed and dedicated as a war memorial on 25 May 1952. Sir Ninian Comper's Warriors' Chapel of St George was a gift of Camberwell Grammar School and Camberwell Girls Grammar School, dedicated on 6 November 1955. Joseph Stansfield completed the entire series of windows in the clerestory in 1968, and these works are regarded as amongst his most interesting and well-executed. Other notable stained glass artists who contributed works to St Mark's are Christian Waller, D. Taylor Kellock, and John L.E. Orval.

== See also ==
- Architecture of Melbourne
- List of Anglican churches in Melbourne
- List of places on the Victorian Heritage Register in the City of Boroondara
