= Jefferies house, Melbourne =

Heritage-listed house in Melbourne, Victoria, Australia

Jeffries house
- Location of the house in Greater Metropolitan Melbourne
- Alternative names: Julian St Jefferies House

General information
- Status: Completed
- Type: House
- Architectural style: Inter-war Californian Bungalow
- Location: 7 Warwick Avenue, Surrey Hills, City of Boroondara, Melbourne, Victoria, Australia
- Coordinates: 37°49′44″S 145°05′53″E
- Completed: 1924; 102 years ago
- Client: Julian St Jefferies

Technical details
- Structural system: Knitlock
- Material: Precast concrete blocks; steel; tiles

Design and construction
- Architect: Walter Burley Griffin

Victorian Heritage Register
- Official name: Jeffries House
- Type: Registered place
- Designated: 5 March 1980
- Reference no.: VHR H0461
- Heritage overlay no.: HO136
- Category: Residential buildings (private)

Register of the National Estate
- Official name: Julian St Jefferies House
- Type: Defunct register
- Designated: 21 March 1978
- Reference no.: 5637

The Jeffries house, also known as the Julian St Jefferies House, is a house located at 7 Warwick Avenue in Surrey Hills, in the City of Boroondara, in the inner eastern suburbs of Melbourne, in Victoria, Australia.

Built in 1924 on the traditional lands of the Wurundjeri people, the house was added to the Victorian Heritage Register on 5 March 1980 in recognition of its historical and architectural significance; and was also added to the non-statutory and now defunct Register of the National Estate on 21 March 1978.

== Description ==
The Jefferies house was designed for Julian St Jefferies and his wife in 1924 by Walter Burley Griffin. The modest house, completed in the Inter-war Californian Bungalow style, utilises the knitlock construction system patented by Griffin in 1917, a precast concrete block and roof-cast system.

The single-storey dwelling is a rare example of the knitlock construction system that was devised by Griffin to provide low-cost housing. The interlocking wall system of pre-made concrete elements is one of the earliest uses of concrete in Australian housing and is particularly advanced in technological terms. The planning of the house was highly innovative and with its detailing is most distinctive. Nearly square in plan, the house is built using walls of precast concrete tiles strengthened with regularly-spaced ribs and steel reinforcing. The roof is clad in diagonally laid flat tiles with open trellised eaves. The house was externally painted unsympathetically, a carpet and buttresses were added, and there is a new building to the rear.

== See also ==
- Architecture of Melbourne
- List of places on the Victorian Heritage Register in the City of Boroondara
