= Zetland (house) =

Heritage-listed house in Melbourne, Victoria, Australia

- Location of the house in Greater Metropolitan Melbourne
- Etymology: Shetland (archaic sp.)

General information
- Status: Completed
- Type: House
- Architectural style: Victorian Filigree
- Location: 16 Yarra Street, Hawthorn, City of Boroondara, Melbourne, Victoria, Australia
- Coordinates: 37°49′22″S 145°01′12″E
- Completed: 1874; 152 years ago
- Cost: £60
- Client: Charles Black
- Owner: John and Robina Robertson (1876–1914)

Technical details
- Material: Bricks; cast iron; slate
- Grounds: 980 m^{2} (10,500 sq ft) (2019)

Design and construction
- Architect: William J. Ellis

Victorian Heritage Register
- Official name: Zetland
- Type: Registered place
- Criteria: a., d.
- Designated: 3 September 1980
- Reference no.: VHR H0477
- Heritage overlay no.: HO141
- Category: Residential buildings (private)

Register of the National Estate
- Official name: Zetland
- Type: Defunct register
- Designated: 21 October 1980
- Reference no.: 5670

Zetland is a house located at 16 Yarra Street in Hawthorn, in the City of Boroondara, in the inner eastern suburbs of Melbourne, in Victoria, Australia.

Built between 1873 and 1874 on the traditional lands of the Wurundjeri people, the house was added to the Victorian Heritage Register on 3 September 1980 in recognition of its historical and architectural significance; and was also added to non-statutory lists by the Victorian branch of the National Trust on 2 April 1970 and the now defunct Register of the National Estate on 21 October 1980.

== Description ==
Zetland was built between 1873 and 1874 for Charles Black at a cost of £60, located in St James Park Estate, a subdivision of the Burwood Estate, established by Sir James Frederick Palmer, the third Mayor of Melbourne. Sir James' mansion, now called Invergowrie, is extant and located behind Zetland, at 21 Coppin Grove. In 1973, St James Park Estate became Melbourne's first gazetted suburban conservation zone.

Designed by William J. Ellis, the house is a single-storey rendered brick Victorian Filigree villa with a symmetrical main elevation with a cast iron verandah across the full width. The close centres of the posts and curved brackets result in an arcaded effect. Other facade features are the balustrade and arched door openings. The hipped roof is clad with slate. The cast iron palisade fence is another significant feature.

John Robertson (1831–1913) named the house as Zetland, an archaic spelling of Shetland, when he and his wife, Robina, acquired the villa from 1876. Robinson was an accountant who was born in Lerwick, in the Shetland Islands, and following his death, the house was sold for £66 in 1914.

As in 1980, the roof finials and chimney pots were removed. In need of internal repairs, the house was listed for sale in 2019, with seven rooms, including four bedrooms, that included Victorian-era features such as a wide-arched hallway, marble open fireplaces, timber floors, bells to call servants, and former stables, since converted to a garage. At the time of its 2019 sale for c. 3.4–3.7 million, the house was set on 980 square metres (10,500 sq ft).

== See also ==
- Architecture of Melbourne
- List of places on the Victorian Heritage Register in the City of Boroondara
