= Alloarmo =

Heritage-listed house in Melbourne, Victoria, Australia

- Location of the house in Greater Metropolitan Melbourne

General information
- Status: Completed
- Type: House
- Architectural style: Old Colonial Gothic Picturesque; Victorian Rustic Gothic
- Location: 5 Grattan Street, Hawthorn, City of Boroondara, Melbourne, Victoria, Australia
- Coordinates: 37°49′03″S 145°01′01″E
- Completed: c.1856; 170 years ago

Technical details
- Material: Bricks; timber; slate; stucco; bluestone; cast iron; marble
- Grounds: c.1,650 m^{2} (17,800 sq ft)

Victorian Heritage Register
- Official name: Alloarmo
- Type: Registered place
- Designated: 22 June 1983
- Reference no.: H0552
- Heritage overlay no.: HO52
- Category: Residential buildings (private)

Register of the National Estate
- Official name: Alloarmo
- Type: Defunct register
- Designated: 30 June 1992
- Reference no.: 5968

Alloarmo is a house located at 5 Grattan Street in Hawthorn, in the City of Boroondara, in the inner suburbs of Melbourne, in Victoria, Australia.

Built in c. 1856 on the traditional lands of the Wurundjeri people, the house was added to the Victorian Heritage Register on 22 June 1983 in recognition of its historical and architectural significance; and was also added to non-statutory lists by the Victorian branch of the National Trust on 4 December 1980 and the now defunct Register of the National Estate on 30 June 1992.

== History ==
The exact history of the house is unclear. A rate book reveals that the house was built at some point between 1850s and 1860s date, which the external appearance tends to confirm. However, according to another source, on 29 January 1875, the portion of land was purchased from James Denham Pinnock and presumes that the oldest part of the house was built in that year. This source indicates that in the late 1890s the western section was built.

Construction of Alloarmo commenced in c. 1856. Another two sections were added in c. 1895 and again in the 1930s or 1940s. The original section was built in brick, with an attic and cellar, and was constructed in the simple Victorian Rustic Gothic style with a steeply-pitched slate roof and decorated bargeboards. Brick extensions were undertaken in the mid-1890s in the Old Colonial Gothic Picturesque style and included a series of interlocking gables and mansard roofs with a gabled porch, the latter incorporating cast iron in a Gothic tracery design. The twentieth century alterations included substantial changes to the interior as well as to the attic and rear verandah.

== Description ==
Alloarmo is historically important because of its association with the growth of urbanisation in Victoria. The original construction of the house in the 1850s is associated with the subdivision and creation of the village of Hawthorn after the construction of a timber bridge over the Yarra in 1851. Later nineteenth century additions to the house are important because associated with the suburbanisation of Hawthorn and increased demographic growth in the area following the extension of the railway in 1861. Alloarmo is able to illustrate trends in architectural fashion in Victoria and to illustrate the emergence of a middle-class willing to demonstrate their prosperity through the design of their homes. The house exhibits two Gothic Revival architectural styles in its design, and therefore is important for its ability to demonstrate diversity through the integration of design features.

The house is built close to the street line with the entrance steps rising directly from the pavement to the entrance door. The asymmetrical design includes roof gables with carved timber trefoil design bargeboards and other Gothic influenced detailing to the verandah.

Alloarmo has five spacious main rooms. The adjoining sitting room and dining room both have arched bay windows. There are also two attic rooms which are quite extensive. In addition there are storerooms and a cellar, one large ornate iron fireplace and one marble chimney piece. Construction is in face brick with stucco castellation and timber barge boards and gable decoration. A bluestone base wall supports the cast iron verandah. The gabled roofs are slate clad. There is land at the rear with a northern aspect and ample garden area.

The property also includes another brick residence, converted into three flats (known as 23 Creswick Street). Original interior is mostly intact but in need of restoration. In c. 1982 an application to alter the house was made, including demolishing the outhouse, putting in a new entry and arbour, altering interior and fence, clean brickwork. In 1990, the exterior was intact and in good condition.

== See also ==
- Architecture of Melbourne
- List of places on the Victorian Heritage Register in the City of Boroondara
