= Ross House, Kew =

Heritage-listed house in Melbourne, Victoria, Australia

Ross House
- Location of the house in Greater Metropolitan Melbourne
- Former names: Charleville

General information
- Status: Completed
- Type: House
- Architectural style: Victorian Italianate
- Location: 92 Cotham Road, Kew, City of Boroondara, Melbourne, Victoria, Australia
- Coordinates: 37°48′34″S 145°03′04″E
- Completed: 1889; 137 years ago
- Client: Charles A. Donaldson
- Owner: Charles A. Donaldson (1889–1939); Dr Thomas King (1939–1950s); Bob Stillwell

Technical details
- Material: Stuccoed bricks; bluestone; marble; stained glass
- Grounds: 4,577 m^{2} (49,270 sq ft) (1988)

Design and construction
- Architect: Henry Shallers
- Main contractor: G. Ginham

Victorian Heritage Register
- Official name: Ross House (Kew)
- Type: Registered place
- Designated: 9 October 1974
- Reference no.: VHR H0202
- Heritage overlay no.: HO38
- Category: Residential buildings (private)

Register of the National Estate
- Official name: Ross House
- Type: Defunct register
- Designated: 21 March 1978
- Reference no.: 5674

The Ross House, previously called Charleville, is a house located at 92 Cotham Road in Kew, in the City of Boroondara, in the inner eastern suburbs of Melbourne, in Victoria, Australia.

Built in 1889 on the traditional lands of the Wurundjeri people, the house was added to the Victorian Heritage Register on 9 October 1974 in recognition of its historical and architectural significance; and was also added to non-statutory lists by the Victorian branch of the National Trust on November 1993 and the now defunct Register of the National Estate on 21 March 1978.

== History ==
Ross House, formerly called Charleville, was built as a two-storey mansion in 1889 for Charles A. Donaldson. It was designed in the Italianate style by the architect Henry Shallers and built by G. Ginham. Dr Thomas King, an orthopaedic surgeon, purchased Charleville from Donaldson in 1939 and renamed it as Ross House. King lived in the house until at least 1951.

Set on 4,577 square metres (49,270 sq ft), the 12-bedroom house was listed for sale in 1988, with a tennis court and swimming pool; and again listed eighteen months later, for mortgagee auction.

== Description ==
Constructed of stuccoed brickwork on a bluestone plinth, the house is symmetrically arranged with a double-storeyed arcade supporting a balustraded parapet to three sides. Corinthian columns support the arcade and the piers are decorated with Corinthian pilasters. The original decorations to some principal rooms remain. A mansion of most imposing aspect with exceptionally good examples of pressed paper door panels, friezes and ceilings and beautifully painted ceiling centre pieces, despite some interior decoration. Important in that Shallers' drawings of 1888 survive to authenticate the building.

Ross House is of historical importance for its association with Melbourne's urban development. The house is historically important in illustrating late nineteenth-century social values and the importance of establishing status through the construction of an imposing residence. The substantially intact mansion of the Melbourne boom period is architecturally important in exhibiting good design and the aesthetic characteristics in a domestic application of the Italianate style.

== See also ==
- Architecture of Melbourne
- List of places on the Victorian Heritage Register in the City of Boroondara
