= Hawthorn Fire Station =

Fire station building in Melbourne, Australia

Hawthorn Fire Station (former)
- Location of the former fire station in Greater Metropolitan Melbourne
- Alternative names: Hawthorn Metropolitan Fire Station

General information
- Status: Completed
- Type: Fire station and flats (1910–1997); University building (since c. 2017)
- Architectural style: Edwardian Freestyle
- Location: 66–68 William Street, Hawthorn, City of Boroondara, Melbourne, Victoria, Australia
- Coordinates: 37°49′21″S 145°02′22″E
- Current tenants: Design Factory Melbourne
- Completed: 1910; 116 years ago
- Opened: 11 March 1910
- Renovated: 2017–2018
- Closed: 1997 (as a fire station)
- Renovation cost: A$7 million
- Owner: Metropolitan Brigades Board (1892–c. 2017); Swinburne University of Technology (since c. 2017)

Technical details
- Material: Red bricks

Design and construction
- Architect: Cedric Ballantyne

Renovating team
- Architect: H20
- Main contractor: Bldg.Eng

Victorian Heritage Register
- Official name: Former Hawthorn Fire Station
- Type: Registered place
- Designated: 14 August 1997
- Reference no.: VHR H1327
- Heritage overlay no.: HO222
- Category: Utilities - Fire Control

The Hawthorn Fire Station is a former fire station at 66–68 William Street in Hawthorn, an inner-east suburb of Melbourne in Victoria, Australia. The building has also been known as the Hawthorn Metropolitan Fire Station and as the Former Hawthorn Fire Station.

The building was added to the Victorian Heritage Register on 14 August 1997 in recognition of its architectural and historical significance; and was also added to non-statutory lists by the Victorian branch of the National Trust in 1985 and the City of Boroondara in 1992.

== History ==
The Hawthorn Voluntary Fire Brigade was established in 1879, initially located at the rear of the former Hawthorn Town Hall. In 1892, the Metropolitan Brigades Board purchased land on William Street for a purpose-built fire station in Hawthorn. However, due to the financial crash of the 1890’s, the fire station was not completed until 1910, and was officially opened on 11 March of that year. Designed by Cedric Ballantyne of the architectural firm of Oakden and Ballantyne, the station initially accommodated horse-drawn fire carts, and by 1915, motorised fire engines were installed; with the Hawthorn Fire Station reportedly the location for the first fully-motorised fleet of fire engines in Australia.

Following the brigade's relocation to a modern building located at 45 William Street, the 1910 fire station building was decommissioned in 1997 and subsequently acquired by Swinburne University of Technology as part of the university's innovation hub. The former fire station building was renovated and a new four-storey extension was added at the rear. Heritage features were retained in the former fire station including timber fireplaces, cobblestone flooring to the former stable area, the firemen's helmet rack, and a fold-up bed within a joinery unit in the front office. As of May 2018, the building was occupied by Design Factory Melbourne.

== Description ==
When built in 1910, the two-storey asymmetrical red-brick building consisted of a fire station at ground floor level and two flats above. The Edwardian Freestyle-designed building is most notable for its arched vehicle openings with original timber doors, and its Art Nouveau wrought iron detailing; with a bland proto-Modern adjacent residential section. At the time of its 1997 decommissioning and apart from minor and reversible modifications, the building was remarkably intact and retained all the features of a small suburban fire station.

== See also ==
- Architecture of Melbourne
- List of places on the Victorian Heritage Register in the City of Boroondara
