= Broughton Hall, Camberwell =

Heritage-listed former mansion in Melbourne, Victoria, Australia

Broughton Hall
- Location of the mansion in Greater Metropolitan Melbourne
- Former names: Tara
- Alternative names: Benetas Broughton Hall

General information
- Status: Completed
- Type: Mansion (1858–1951); Agred care facility (since 1951– )
- Architectural style: Victorian Italianate
- Location: 2 Berwick Street, Camberwell, City of Boroondara, Melbourne, Victoria, Australia
- Coordinates: 37°49′27″S 145°03′38″E
- Completed: 1858; 168 years ago
- Client: Sir John O'Shanassy
- Owner: O'Shanassy family (1858–1900); Anglican Diocese of Melbourne (since 1951)
- Operator: Benetas (aged care)

Technical details
- Material: Stuccoed bricks
- Grounds: 19 ha (46 acres) (in 1884)

Design and construction
- Architect: J. M. Barry
- Other designers: Robert Reid (interior decorator)

Website
- benetas.com.au

Victorian Heritage Register
- Official name: Broughton Hall
- Type: Registered place
- Designated: 18 April 1996
- Reference no.: VHR H1176
- Heritage overlay no.: HO17
- Category: Residential buildings (private)

Register of the National Estate
- Official name: Broughton Hall
- Type: Defunct register
- Designated: undated
- Reference no.: 5641

Broughton Hall, formerly known as Tara, is a former mansion and now residential aged care facility, located at 2 Berwick Street in Camberwell, in the City of Boroondara, in the inner eastern suburbs of Melbourne, in Victoria, Australia.

Built in 1858 on the traditional lands of the Wurundjeri people, the house was added to the Victorian Heritage Register on 18 April 1996 in recognition of its historical and architectural significance; and was also added to non-statutory lists by the Victorian branch of the National Trust on 30 October 1958 and the now defunct Register of the National Estate on an unknown date.

== History ==
Tara – as it was then called – was constructed in c. 1858 for Sir John O'Shanassy, one of the colony's early immigrants and three times Premier of Victoria, between 1857 and 1863. The mansion was designed by J. M Barry, and the facade was completed by 1859. Later in 1883, tenders were called by William Salway for ‘additions, alterations and repairs to Tara, Camberwell for Mr. O’Shanassy’, and, prior to that, by architects William Ellis for new stabling. The Argus of 1884 described the completed interior decoration by Robert Reid and the reconstruction of the interior by William Salway. Reid achieved a great deal of publicity for his creations in the 1880s. His designs from the Ducal Palace at Mantua were used in J. M. Bruce's Wombaleno where The Argus commented that the cabinet work, gas brackets, brass door furniture were locally made although the carpets and ‘hanging’ were imported from the ‘Old Country’.

By 1884, Matthew Patrick O’Shanassy was the resident owner of the eighteen-roomed mansion, Tara, and the surrounding 19 hectares (46 acres). A brief change of occupancy occurred in 1888 when George Langridge, auctioneer, leased Tara. He also purchased 18 hectares (45 acres) of the grounds and subdivided it in this boom year of 1888. Matthew O’Shanassy regained possession by 1893 until his death in 1900 after which John Coupar, warehouseman, owned and occupied the house. Mrs Annie Coupar continued there for many years during the early part of the twentieth century, followed by a Mrs M Leets in the 1930s. The house was the Tara Guest House in the 1930s. During Mrs Cooper's period, the lots between Tara and Burke Road were divided into the Tara Estate.

=== Residential aged care facility ===
The mansion was purchased by the Anglican Diocese of Melbourne in 1951 and operates as Benetas Broughton Hall, an aged care facility for 65 residents. In 2007, four elderly residents died of complications associated with an outbreak of gastroenteritis; 22 of the 30 residents contracted gastroenteritis; and sixteen tested positive for salmonella. Following a coronial inquest into the four deaths, it was revealed that one of the deaths was preventable. The operator made a formal apology for its failure to provide adequate duty of care.

== Description ==
The two-storey building is an early Italian Renaissance Revival mansion with an open terrace to three sides which includes refined ornamentation. It is perhaps the oldest of this type and style surviving in Victoria. Historically, Tara was for a long period the home of one of Victoria's more distinguished politicians and foremost figures of the Catholic Church. This is still reflected in the outward form. The house exterior is unusually ornate and grand for a privately owned mansion of the 1850s.

Internally, the building includes an entrance hall decorated with a cast-metal dado frieze based upon the Lorenzo Ghiberti frieze on the doors of the Florence Baptistery; believed to have been completed in anticipation of a visit by Pope Pius IX. The ornate ornament of the redecorated interior reflects the opulence of the 1880s in way unmatched by any other private house (friezes).

== See also ==
- Architecture of Melbourne
- List of places on the Victorian Heritage Register in the City of Boroondara
