= Invergowrie (house) =

Heritage-listed former mansion in Melbourne, Victoria, Australia

- Location of the former mansion in Greater Metropolitan Melbourne
- Former names: Burwood; Amoe
- Etymology: Invergowrie, Scotland

General information
- Status: Completed
- Type: Mansion; now house
- Architectural style: Victorian Picturesque Gothic
- Location: 21 Coppin Grove, Hawthorn, City of Boroondara, Melbourne, Victoria, Australia
- Coordinates: 37°49′20″S 145°01′05″E
- Year built: 1850–1857
- Completed: 1857; 169 years ago
- Client: Sir James Palmer
- Owner: Sir James Palmer (1845–1869); George Coppin (1869–1881); Alfred Dean and estate (1881–1908); Sir William McPherson (1908–1933); Headmistresses' Association (1933–1992); private ownership (since 1992)

Technical details
- Material: Bluestone; slate; red brick; stained glass; wrought iron
- Grounds: 19 ha (47 acres) (1850s); 1.1 ha (2.7 acres) (1974)

Victorian Heritage Register
- Official name: Invergowrie
- Type: Registered place
- Criteria: a., d., h.
- Designated: 9 October 1974
- Reference no.: VHR H0195
- Heritage overlay no.: HO36
- Category: Residential buildings (private)

Register of the National Estate
- Official name: Invergowrie
- Type: Defunct register
- Designated: 21 March 1978
- Reference no.: 5651

Invergowrie, previously called Burwood and Amoe, is a former mansion located at 21 Coppin Grove in Hawthorn, in the City of Boroondara, in the inner eastern suburbs of Melbourne, in Victoria, Australia.

Built from c. 1845, most likely between 1850 and 1857, on the traditional lands of the Wurundjeri people, the former mansion was added to the Victorian Heritage Register on 9 October 1974 in recognition of its historical and architectural significance; and was also added to non-statutory lists by the Victorian branch of the National Trust on 9 March 1967 and the now defunct Register of the National Estate on 21 March 1978.

== History ==
Burwood was built from c. 1845 – most likely between 1850 and 1857 – for Sir James Palmer, the third Mayor of Melbourne. In 1856, Palmer was elected as the inaugural President of the Legislative Council of Victoria and the mansion was often used for events and meetings associated with his legislative duties.

In 1869, the property was acquired by George Coppin, a comic actor, entrepreneur, politician, and philanthropist, who, with Palmer, (Note: Coppin's ownership of Burwood is unclear. He may have assisted Palmer or taken a share in the estate between 1869 and 1871; as opposed to actually owning the estate.) assisted to subdivide Burwood into 73 allotments which became St James Park Estate, and in 1973, was gazetted as Melbourne's first suburban conservation zone. Palmer died at Burwood in 1871.

However, Charles Edmund Dean, the publican of the Royal Charter Hotel in Bourke Street, died in 1863 as a resident of a property called Amoe. Either Charles Dean, or his son, Alfred A. Dean, renamed Burwood as Amoe. The property was then leased to the Charles Strong who was the first minister of the Australian Ministry Church. Alfred Dean died in 1886, leaving the estate to his widow. She then passed in 1895 leaving the estate in the hands of the executors until 1908. In the interim, Joseph Reed, a well-known Melbourne architect was a tenant at Amoe from 1887 until his death in 1890. Such was his love of Amoe, his funeral departed from this site. Reed's projects included the State Library of Victoria, the Royal Exhibition Building, Geelong City Hall, Melbourne Town Hall, and the Rippon Lea Estate.

In the hands of Dean's estate, the property deteriorated significantly and was to be offered at auction in 1908 for likely demolition and further sub-division. It was however, salvaged by an eleventh-hour intervention by the philanthropist, Sir William McPherson, and he renamed the property Invergowrie. McPherson served as the Premier of Victoria between 1928 and 1929.

Upon his death, in 1933, McPherson's family donated the mansion to the Headmistresses' Association. May Isabella Weatherly moved the homecraft hostel to the house to train future homemakers, until its closure in 1973; and then from 1974 to 1989, Invergrowrie was occupied by the State College of Victoria. The successor of the Headmistresses' Association sold the property for c. $5.4 million in 1992 and used the funds to establish the Invergrowrie Foundation that supports the education of girls and women in Victoria.

The house returned to private ownership as a residence, purchased in 1992 by Coogi knitwear entrepreneur, Jacky Taranto, for $2.7 million; then ten years' later by Angela and Peter Hill for $10.75 million; then in 2013 by Dionnie and Ahmed Fahour for $22 million; before being purchased in 2021 by Angela and Stephen Tomisich, medical entrepreneurs and philanthropists, for A$40.5 million.

== Description ==
The former mansion, now house, was completed in the uncommon Victorian Picturesque Gothic style, of architectural consequence even in its extended and altered state and is important for its historical associations and as the focus of an area of historic and townscape importance. Most likely built using convict labour, the mansion was sent on 19 hectares (47 acres) that was bound by the Yarra River to Burwood Road and Yarra Street.

The old dining room is a most distinctive Gothic interior, whilst externally architectural details including the bellcote, oriels and bargeboard decorated dormers are unusual. The former gate lodge is extant, located at what is now 8 Burwood Road and called Invergowrie Lodge.

The rambling bluestone house is on an elevated site. Externally it has been extensively extended and altered harmoniously. The single-storey mansion with a slate roof and attic, featured projecting gabled wings with bargeboards, decorated dormer windows, oriels and a bellcote. The old dining room and its joinery are most distinguished.

Set on 1.1 hectares (2.7 acres), the grounds of Invergowrie include the former mansion; an early stables building, erected by 1855 with late nineteenth century additions; a double-storey L-shaped cottage, built in 1938; and a picturesque garden setting which retains early landscaping elements, the latter of which have won 21st-century landscaping awards.

== See also ==
- Architecture of Melbourne
- List of gardens in Victoria
- List of places on the Victorian Heritage Register in the City of Boroondara
