= The Zetland =

Listed former pub in North Yorkshire, England

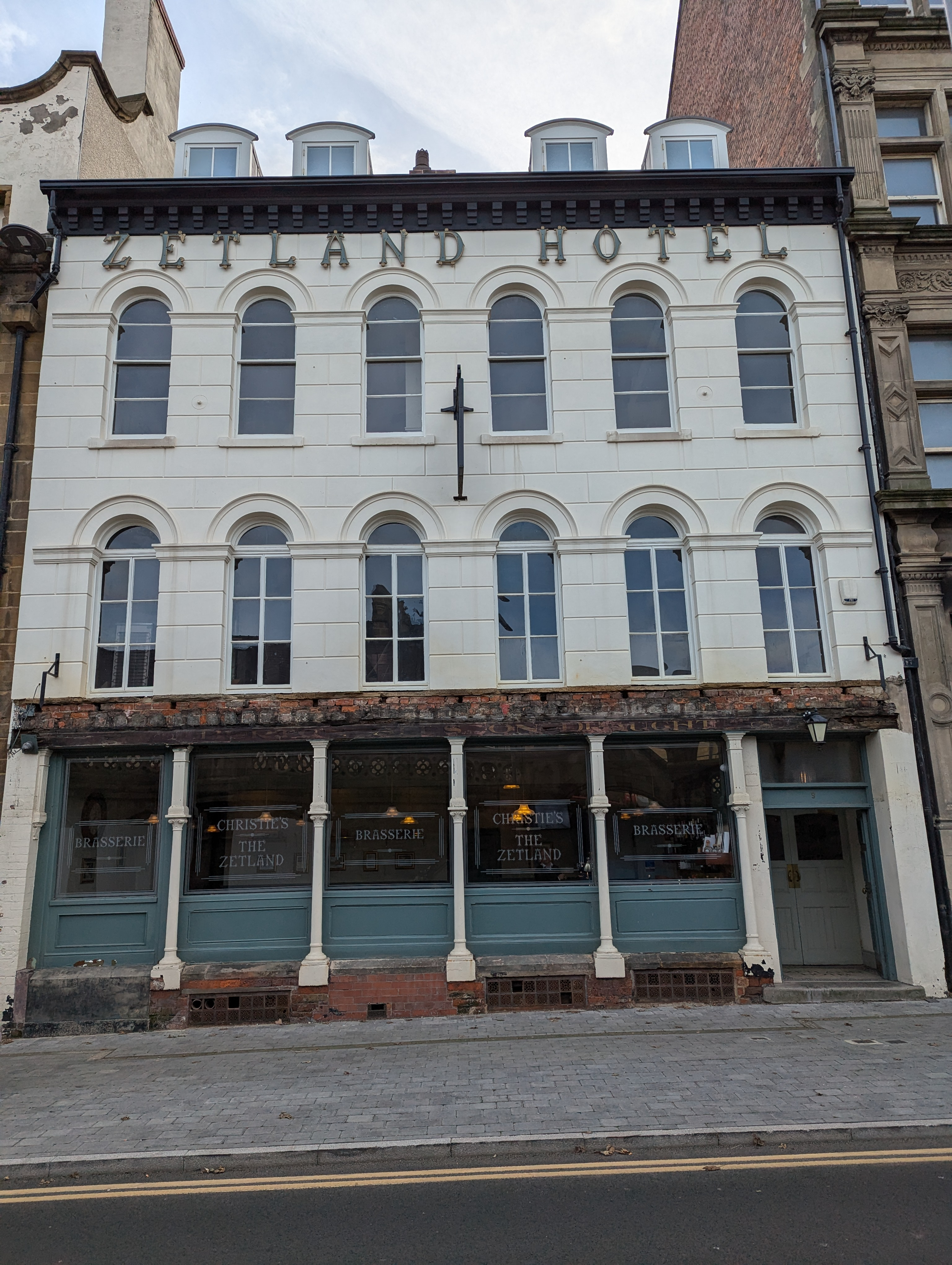
- The pub in 2024, before its closure in 2025
- Interactive map of the The Zetland area
- Former names: Zetland Hotel

General information
- Status: Vacant
- Type: Brasserie (former; originally a pub-hotel)
- Architectural style: Italianate
- Location: 9 Zetland Road, Middlesbrough, England
- Coordinates: 54.57858°N 1.23525°W
- Year built: c. 1860; 166 years ago
- Renovated: 1893 and 1898 (extended); 2018 (renovated)
- Closed: 2025

Design and construction
- Designations

Listed Building – Grade II
- Official name: Zetland Hotel
- Designated: 28 July 1988
- Reference no.: 1139839

Renovating team
- Architects: J. M. Bottomley (1893); W. Duncan (1898)

The Zetland is a former pub-hotel on Zetland Road in the town centre of Middlesbrough, England.

The building was constructed in about 1860, as a hotel with a pub serving Middlesbrough railway station. It was extended to the rear in 1893 by J. M. Bottomley, and then in 1898 by W. Duncan. It is built of brick, with the front rendered to resemble stone.

The building was Grade II listed in 1988. It is regarded by the Campaign for Real Ale as having an interior of "outstanding national historic importance" and is rated three stars in its grading scheme. The pub appeared on the organisation's National Inventory of Historic Pub Interiors, before the grading system was revised. Inside, the Victorian mosaic floor in the lobby survives, but the main interest is in the ground floor rear room, which retains its tiling in cream, brown and blue, large round-arched mirrors, and decorative plaster ceiling.

The Zetland closed in 2015 and was purchased in 2017, reopening the following year as a brasserie and restaurant. In 2025 the establishment closed again and was placed on the market.
