= Hawthorn, Victoria =

Hawthorn
- Suburb
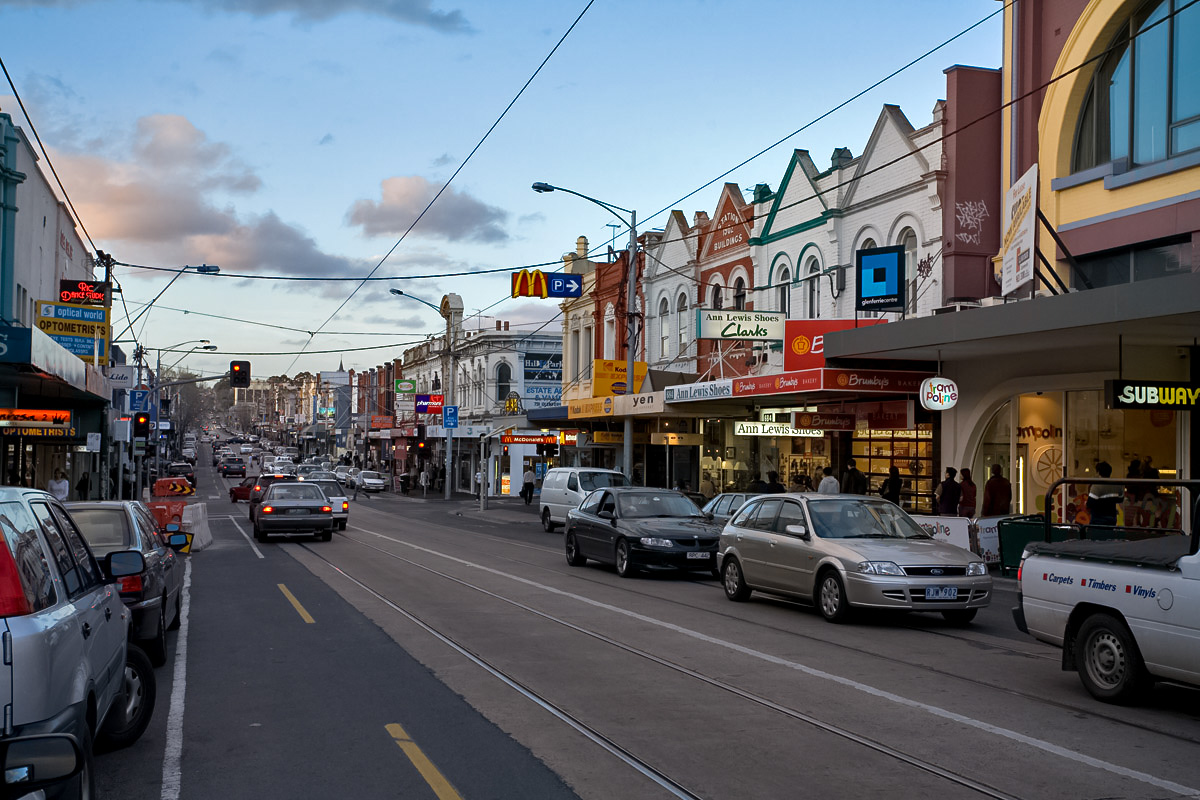
- Hawthorn's Glenferrie Road shopping strip, facing north towards Kew

- Interactive map of Hawthorn
- Coordinates: 37.826°S 145.034°E
- Country: Australia
- State: Victoria
- City: Melbourne
- LGA: City of Boroondara
- Location: 6 km (3.7 mi) from Melbourne

Government
  - State electorate: Hawthorn
  - Federal division: Kooyong

Area
  - Total: 5.7 km^{2} (2.2 sq mi)
- Elevation: 42 m (138 ft)

Population
  - Total: 22,322 (SAL 2021)
- Postcode: 3122
Suburbs around Hawthorn
Richmond	Kew	Kew
Burnley	Hawthorn	Hawthorn East
Toorak	Kooyong	Malvern

Hawthorn is an inner suburb of Melbourne, Victoria, Australia, 6 kilometres (3.7 mi) east of Melbourne's central business district, located within the City of Boroondara local government area. Hawthorn recorded a population of 22,322 at the 2021 census.

== History ==
=== Etymology ===
The name Hawthorn, gazetted in 1840 as "Hawthorne", is thought to have originated from a conversation involving Charles La Trobe, who commented that the native shrubs looked like flowering Hawthorn bushes. Alternatively, the name may originate from the bluestone house—named 'The Hawthorns' and built by James Denham Pinnock at 5 Creswick Street—which stands to this day.

=== Notable 19th-century dwellings ===
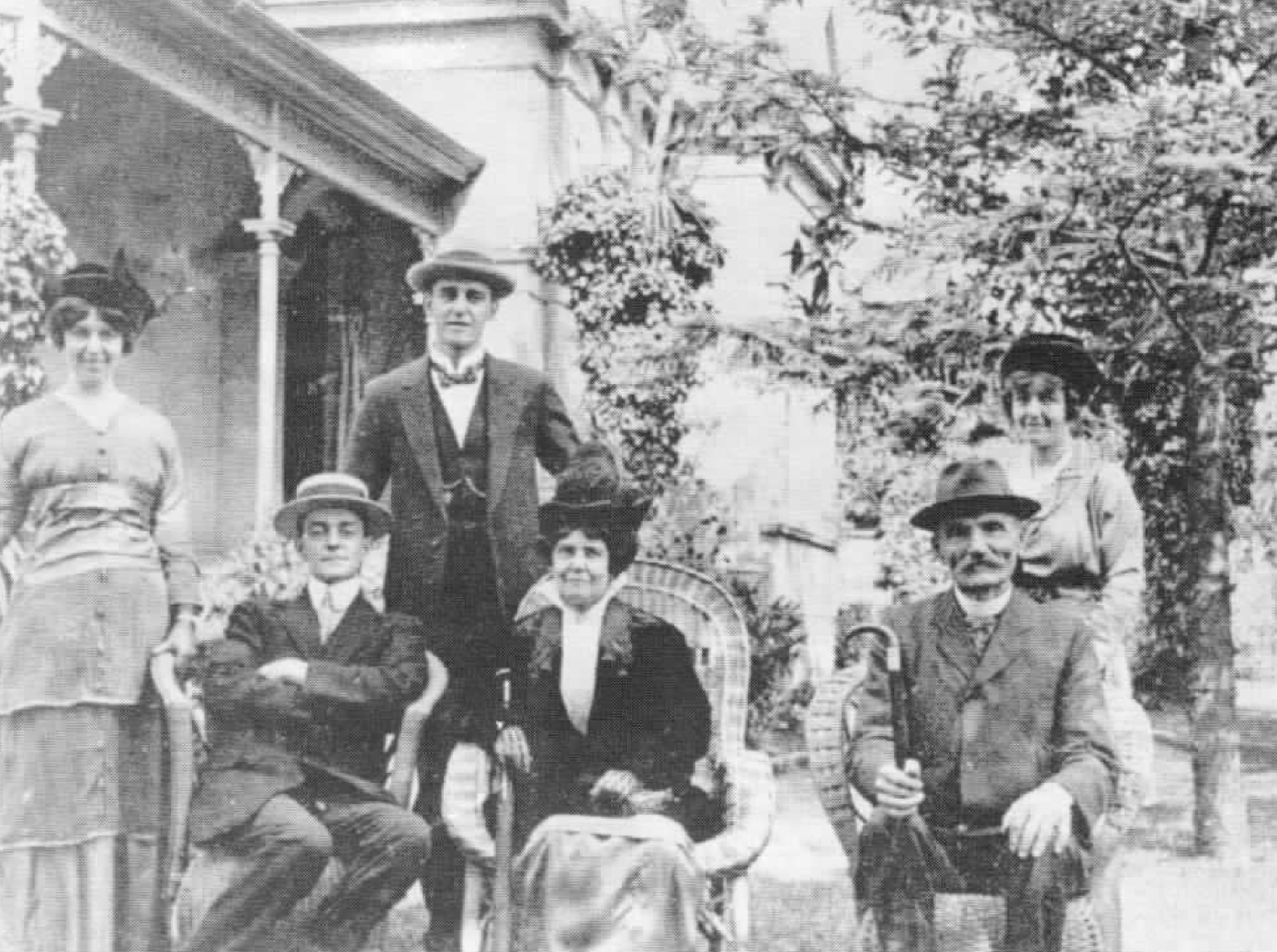
The Trinca family at home in Hawthorn.

==== Invergowrie ====
The mansion named Invergowrie, originally Burwood or Burwood Hill, was built by James Frederick Palmer in 1850 and is the original source of the name of the current Burwood Road. Mayor of Melbourne in 1846, he established the first punt to cross the eastern Yarra around the current Bridge Road area in 1842. The cost was said to be around the equivalent of 45 cents (expensive for the time) but it was very successful and assisted the development and sale of the original Hawthorn allotments. The house was sold after Palmers death in 1871 and subdivided by entrepreneur George Coppin to create the landmark Saint James Estate.

==== The Hawthorns ====
The Hawthorns is one of Hawthorn's oldest houses, built of bluestone in 1845 for James Denham Pinnock (1810–1875), Deputy Registrar of the Supreme Court, before there was a bridge across the river. His property stretched from Church Street to the river, between Denham Street and Lawes Street and was subdivided circa 1850. The homestead block, west of Calvin Street was acquired by pioneer squatter Henry Creswick, whose family remained there for 70 years. Its view was altered by the subsequent development along Creswick Street and Osbourne Court. In the 1856 electoral roll, Creswick's address was given as Hawthorne House. Both Pinnock and Creswick were leading members of the Anglican Church.

==== Tay Creggan ====
Tay Creggan, located at 30 Yarra Street on the banks of the Yarra River, was built in 1892 and was perhaps intended by architect Guyon Purchas to be his own home. However, it was tenanted during the 1890s depression, then the McKean family before World War I and then by the Mortell family. Later, it was owned by the Roman Catholic Church and occupied by the "Ladies of the Grail" from 1939 until 1969. Now owned by Strathcona Baptist Girls Grammar School, it is used as a Year 9 campus. The roof and detailed chimneys were restored in 1993 and boatsheds built near the river. It is frequently rented out by the school to use the original hall for functions.

=== Heritage listings ===
ES&A Bank, built in the Ecclesiastic Victorian Gothic Revival style, 1873

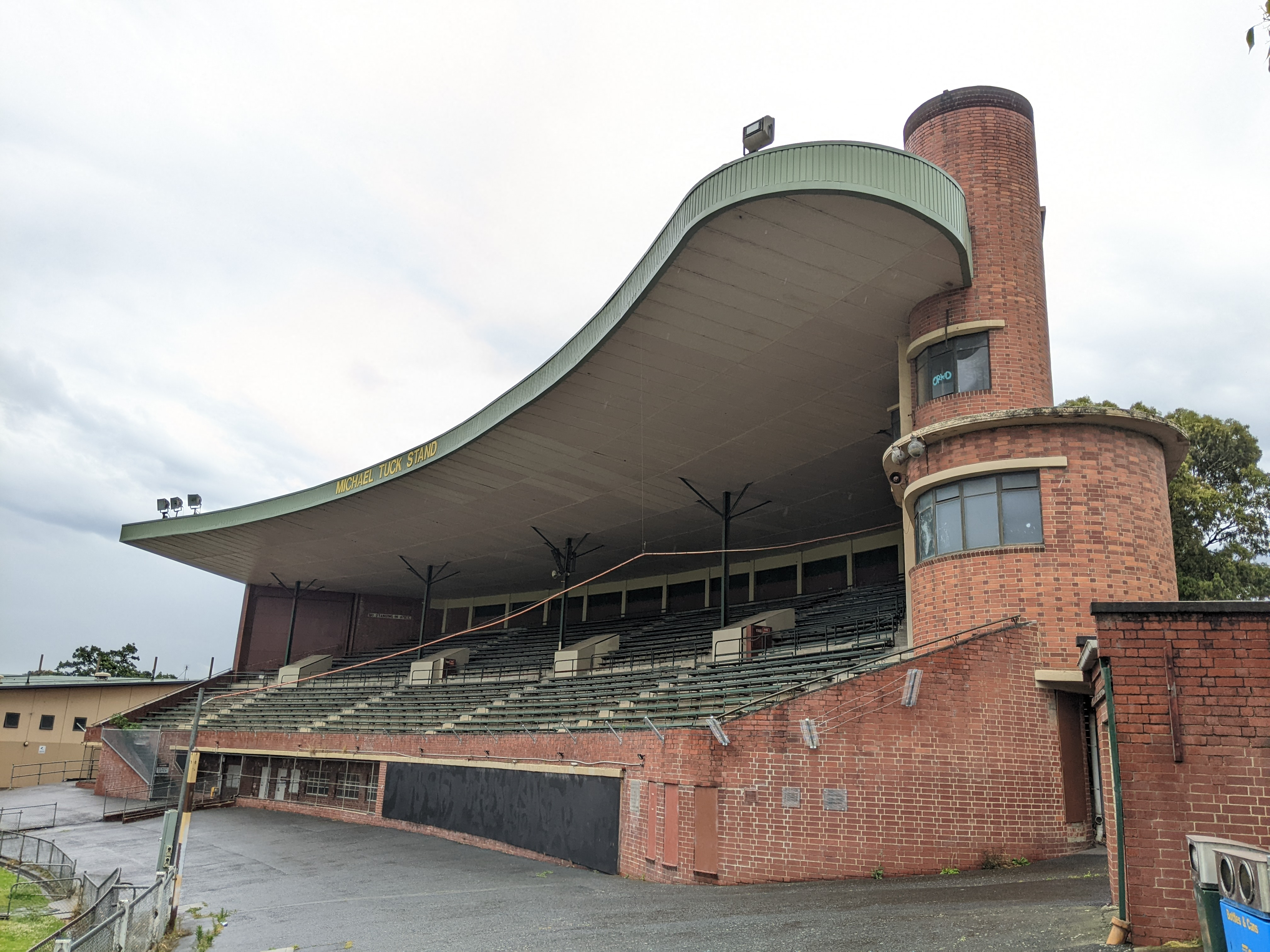
Grandstand at Glenferrie Oval dedicated in honour of Michael Tuck, completed in the Moderne style, 1938

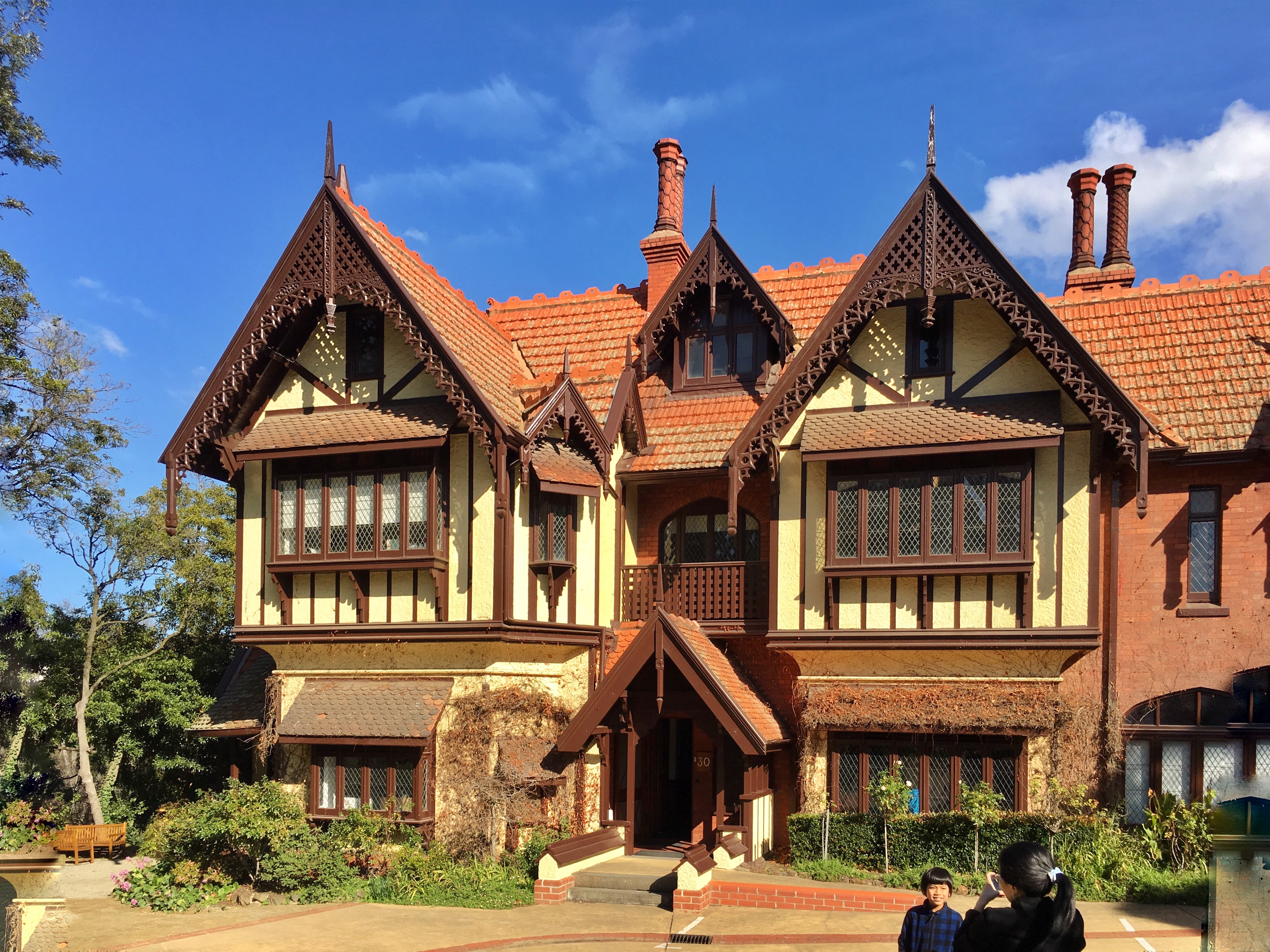
Tay Creggan, built in the Federation Queen Anne Revival style, 1893

The following places in Hawthorn are listed on the Victorian Heritage Register:

- Alloarmo, 5 Grattan Street
- Auburn Uniting Church, 81 Oxley Road and 3 Hepburn Street
- Bridge Hotel (former), 155 Church Street
- Cestria, 521 Glenferrie Road
- ES&A Bank (former), (Manresa People's Centre), 343 Burwood Road
- Glenferrie Oval Grandstand, 34 Linda Crescent
- Glenferrie Primary School (Primary School No. 1508), 78–98 Manningtree Road
- Glenferrie railway station complex, 662–668 Glenferrie Road
- Grace Park House, 19 Chrystobel Crescent
- Hawthorn Bridge, (Yarra River), Burwood Road
- Hawthorn Fire Station (former), 66–68 William Street
- Hawthorn Motor Garage (former), 735 Glenferrie Road
- Hawthorn railway station complex, 54 Burwood Road
- Hawthorn Tramways Trust Depot (former), 8 Wallen Road, including the Electric Tram No. 13
- Invergowrie, 21 Coppin Grove
- Invergowrie Lodge (former), 8 Palmer Place
- Oxford, 21 Isabella Grove
- Robert Cochrane Kindergarten, 2A Minima Street
- Shenton, 41 Kinkora Road
- Talana, 1 Harcourt Street
- Tay Creggan, (a campus of the Strathcona Baptist Girls Grammar School), 30 Yarra Street
- The Hawthorns, 5 Creswick Street
- Wallen Road Bridge, across the Yarra River, Wallen Road
- Zetland, 16 Yarra Street

== Geography ==
=== Urban structure ===
Hawthorn expanded rapidly during the 1880s land boom when grand Victorian houses built in subdivisions like the Grace Park Estate spoke of an upper class suburb. High rates of home ownership, a plethora of noteworthy independent schools (including, from 1916, Scotch College), grand churches, and prominent sporting clubs such as the Grace Park Tennis Club, consolidated Hawthorn's status as an affluent area. Yet the outstanding opulence of residences like John Beswicke's Rotha in Harcourt Street was still the preserve of a minority. By the 1880s working-class families lived in single-fronted, wood-blocked cottages on low-lying subdivisions like those forming Melville, Smart, Barton and Connell streets. Many worked in Hawthorn's clay brickworks found principally in Auburn, east of the village and around the lower parts of Gardiners Creek. Hawthorn bricks referred to as 'pinks', 'blacks' and 'browns' adorned the polychromatic façades of many local houses. During the depression, residential sections of Hawthorn were equally as run-down as those in determinedly working-class Richmond across the Yarra River.

==== Grace Park Estate ====
Grace Park Estate, Hawthorn is located on a gently-sloping site in the eastern suburbs of Melbourne and contains a residential subdivision to the north and public gardens and sporting facilities to the south. The residential portion of the estate contains three curved crescents, intersecting streets and Mary Street as the northern boundary. Streets are tree-lined and contain a fine collection of Victorian and Edwardian houses. A curved portion of open land runs through the estate, once the site of the Kew railway line.

Grace Park Estate, Hawthorn, consists of the roadways and public open space within the boundaries of Glenferrie Road, the Melbourne-Lilydale railway reserve, Power Street and the laneway between Mary Street and Kinkora Road; excluding land associated with the Glenferrie Oval Grandstand which is already listed in the Victorian Heritage Register as H0890. This site is part of the traditional land of the Kulin nation.

One of the most significant properties in Hawthorn, the original Grace Park house was constructed by Michael Lynch in 1858 on a large parcel of 38 hectares (94 acres) bounded by Power Street to the west, Barkers Road to the north, Glenferrie Road to the east and down to Burwood Road in the south (where the original entrance drive was located). The house originally comprised eight rooms, and had grown to eighteen by 1870 and after Lynch's death was occupied by Mrs Robert Colvin Clark's Ladies' College in 1874. The Estate was subdivided in 1884 into the Grace Park Estate and lots were sold into the early twentieth century giving rise to its superb Victorian and Edwardian character.

The 1884 Grace Park subdivision, which forms the boundaries of this nomination, was not completely realised. Instead areas to the south were unsold and acquired by the Hawthorn City Council and developed for public purposes in the twentieth century. The residential section to the north of the precinct retains the main pattern of gently curving crescents and perpendicular roads. Bluestone laneways remain largely intact and street trees have generally been replanted from the 1920s onwards. The bisecting of the residential estate by the Kew railway line had a large impact on development, necessitating the insertion of a cutting and the construction of bridges to enable the continuation of the crescents. The subsequent removal of this has left a wide reserve and altered the crescent pattern with the continuation of Hilda Crescent along the former railway reserve.

=== Demographics ===
In the 2021 Census, Hawthorn recorded a population of 22,322 people, 51.7% female and 48.3% male. The median age recorded during this census period was 34, 4 years below the national median of 38. 67.9% of people were born in Australia. The next most common countries of birth were India 3.5%, England 3.1%, China (excludes SARs and Taiwan) 3.1%, New Zealand 1.7% and Malaysia 1.6%. 75.3% of people spoke only English at home; the next most common languages were Mandarin 4.2%, Greek 1.6%, Vietnamese 1.3%, Cantonese 1.4% and Spanish 1.0%. The most common responses for religion were No Religion 48.5% and Catholic 18.4%.

=== Localities ===
==== Glenferrie ====
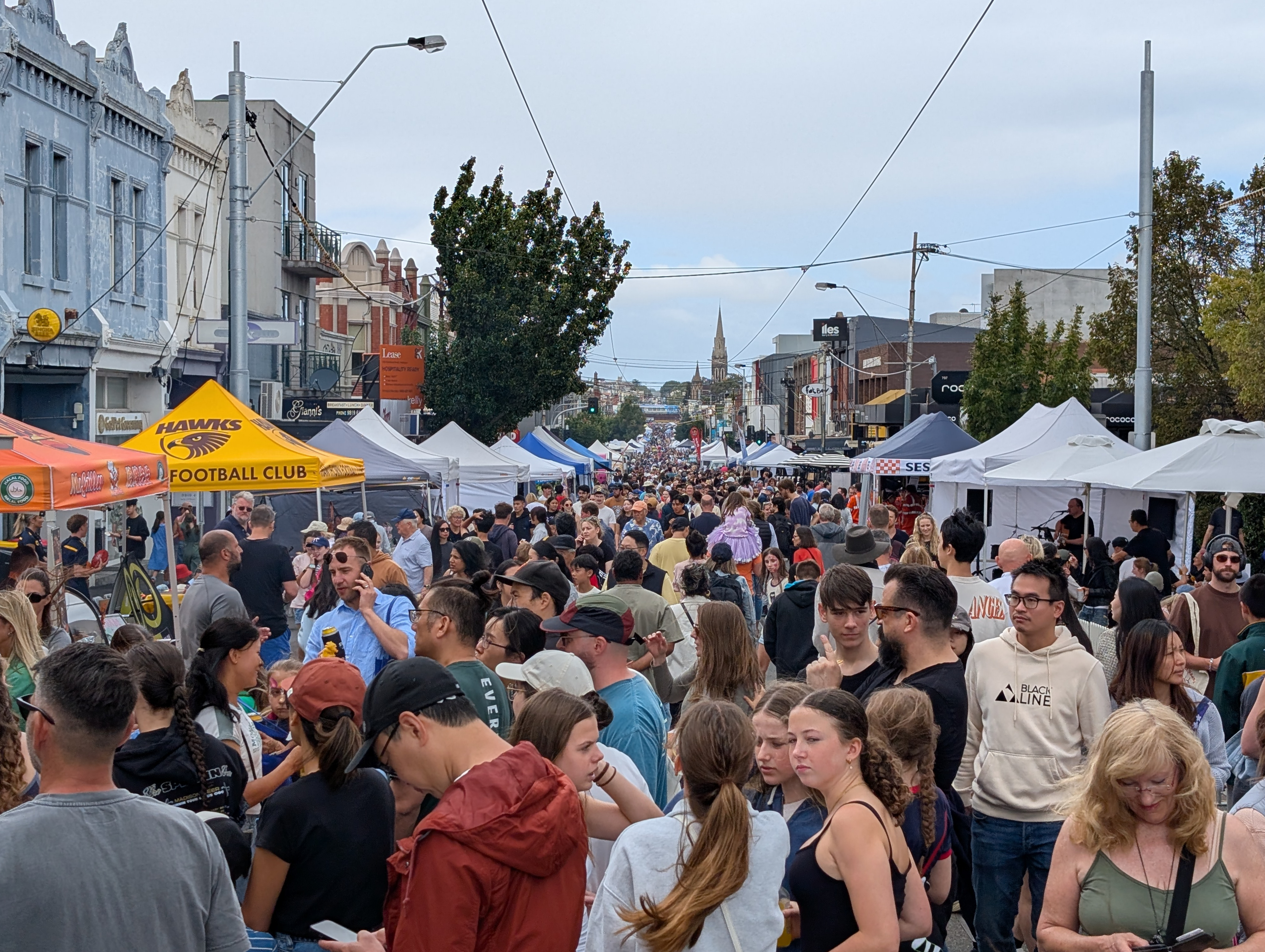
The annual Glenferrie Festival on Glenferrie Road.

Glenferrie (/ˈɡlɛnfɛrɪ/ GLEN-ferri) is a part of Hawthorn centred around the Glenferrie shopping strip and civic precinct. It was formerly known as Upper Hawthorn but eventually took its new name from Glenferrie Road.

=== Landmarks ===
==== Hawthorn Arts Centre ====
The Hawthorn Town Hall building was designed by John Beswicke, and opened with a grand ball in October 1889. In 1911, architect John Koch designed extensions and renovations, with a balcony in the hall, new decorations and a clock in the tower. In 1930 Stuart Calder designed additions–a new Council chamber, new upper foyer and entrance portico. Weekly dances (Saturday nights), debutante balls, concerts, wedding receptions, soup kitchens, immunisation programmes and more recently craft markets are just some of the activities which have taken place in the beautiful ballroom of Hawthorn Town Hall. Over 2012–2013 the Hawthorn Town Hall underwent a $17.9 million refurbishment as a key Boroondara Arts and Cultural facility, with new amenities, including meeting rooms, new art galleries, a gallery commercial area, exhibition and workshop spaces and a café. It was reopened in late 2013 as the Hawthorn Arts Centre.

==== Governor Hotham Hotel ====
One of Hawthorn's first hotels, it was constructed in 1855 and has been continuously operating for 157 years. Operated and owned by John Conran, the hotel was the site for many significant meetings that were instrumental in the development of Hawthorn. Important organisations such as the Boroondara District Road Board used it as a meeting place as they were responsible for the development of roads in an area of 5180 hectares (20 square miles). Now known as "The Hawthorn".

=== Parks and gardens ===
The suburb has a number of public recreation areas and the suburb is noted for the number, size and quality of its parks, many of which still retain layouts that were first made in the 19th century. Hawthorn was originally a brick-making area and many of its parks are on the sites of former quarries, which were filled-in by them becoming tips and then parkland.

== Economy ==
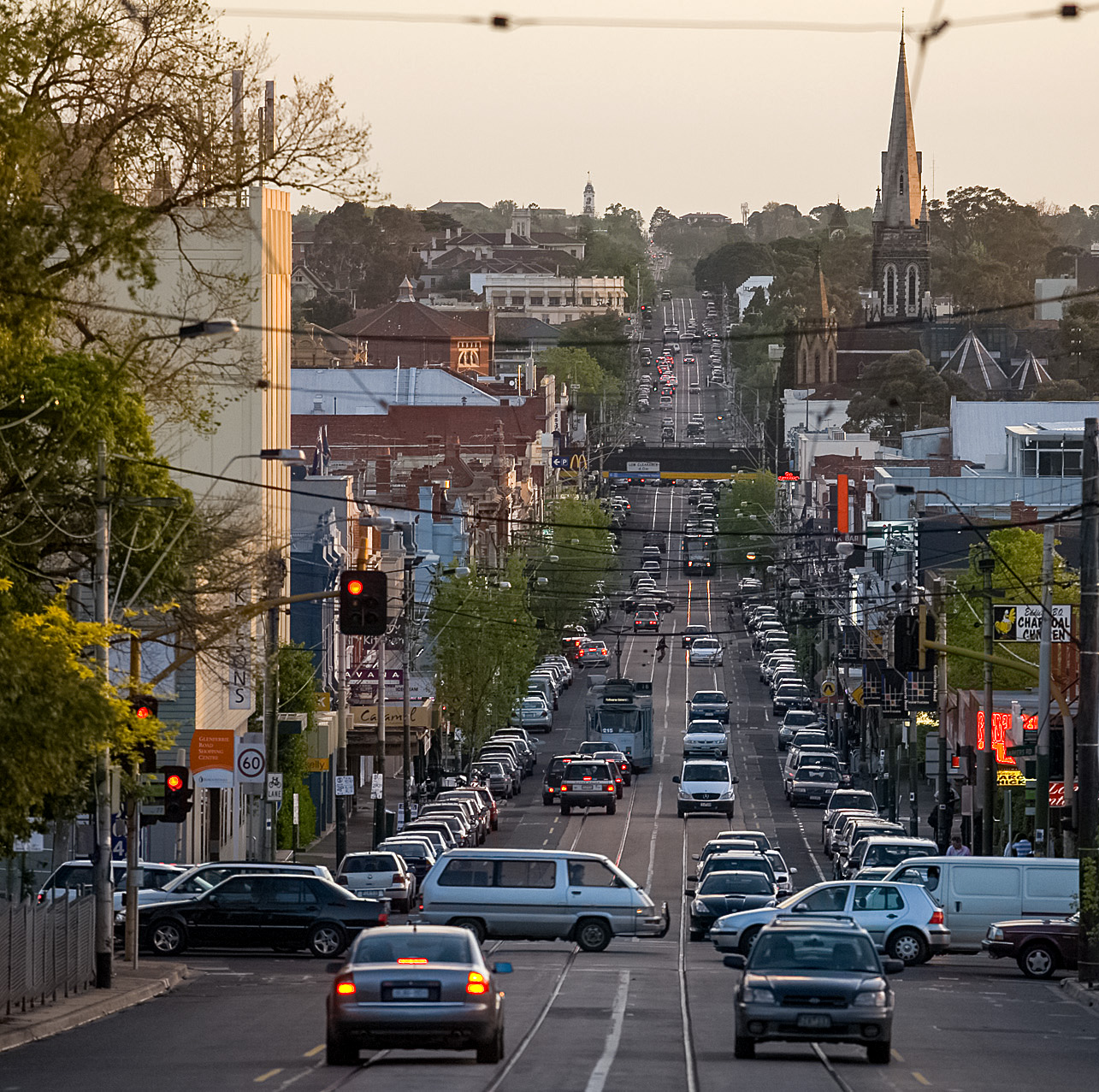
Glenferrie Road facing south, looking down the hill from Kew. Beyond the traffic light is Hawthorn, and the foreground is in Kew, as Barkers Road forms the border

Glenferrie Road is a major shopping strip, with two supermarkets, major banks and many chain and specialty stores. There are also shopping centres at the corner of Burwood Road and Power Street, in Church Street, along Auburn Road (the western side of which is within the Hawthorn postcode, while the eastern side is in Hawthorn East), the corner of Glenferrie Road and Riversdale Road, and the corner of Auburn Road and Riversdale Road.

Hawthorn is particularly noted for the number, range and quality of its restaurants, many of which reflect the strong ethnic diversity of the region. There are also many nightclubs and hotels in the suburb.

Although mainly referred to as a residential region, there is some industry in the area, particularly in Burwood Road, between Power Street and Auburn Road.

Amcor and Orora are among the companies based in Hawthorn.

== Education ==
Hawthorn is home to Swinburne University of Technology, which offers university and TAFE courses.

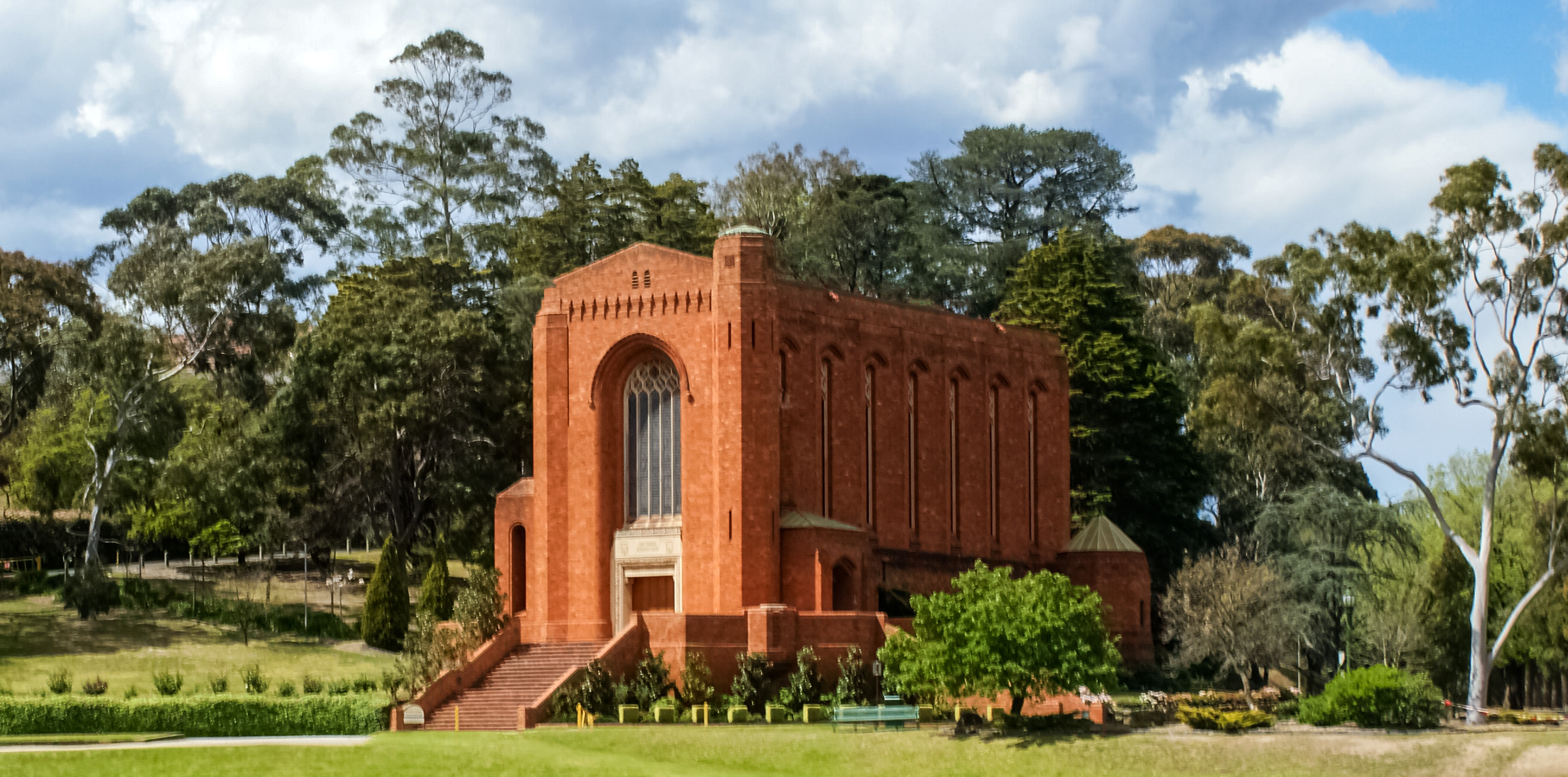
Chapel at Scotch College

The suburb is also home to a number of independent schools, including Erasmus Primary School, Saint Joseph's Primary School, Genazzano FCJ College, Preshil School, Rossbourne School, Scotch College, and the Tay Creggan campus of Strathcona Baptist Girls Grammar School. The area falls within the zones of multiple independent schools in Camberwell, Malvern and Hawthorn East, including Alia College, Bialik College, and De La Salle College; as well as those in Kew and Canterbury, including Camberwell Girls Grammar School, Camberwell Grammar School, Carey Baptist Grammar School, Methodist Ladies' College, Ruyton Girls' School, Trinity Grammar School, and Xavier College.

The suburb also contains several government primary schools, including the Auburn, Glenferrie and Hawthorn West primary schools. The area also gives access to government schools in nearby Hawthorn East, namely the Auburn High School, and Auburn South Primary School.

== Property values ==
In the 12-month period to January 2020 Hawthorn reported a median house price of A$1.76 million for a three bedroom house.

== Government ==
The City of Boroondara retains offices in the former Hawthorn Town Hall, in Burwood Road (near the corner of Glenferrie Road). This building is noted as a good example of late 19th Century public-building architecture. Boroondara City Council, Swinburne University and many other organisations maintain many important facilities within the city.

== Transport ==
Hawthorn is serviced by two railway stations: Hawthorn and Glenferrie. It is also served by tram routes 16, 48, 70, 72, 75 and 109.

The former Kew railway line originally cut through the Grace Park Estate in 1887 and the Barker railway station was on the northern boundary. The old train route is still easily discernible by the tract of parkland that gently curves through the streets.

== Sport ==
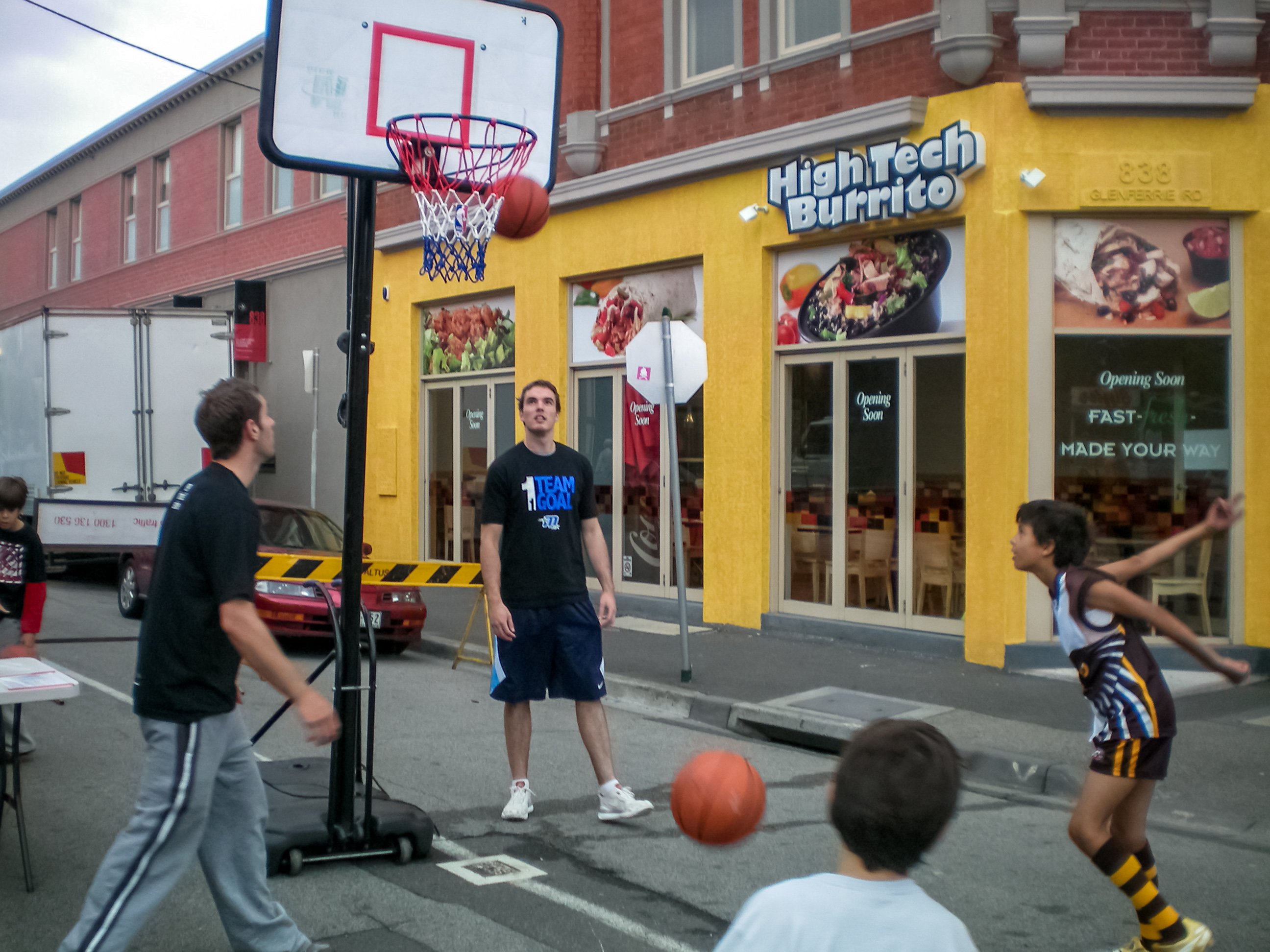
A boy wearing a Hawks outfit plays with the local basketball team

The suburb is the spiritual home of the Hawthorn Football Club of the AFL. It is also home to the Hawthorn Citizens, a junior Australian rules football team who compete in the Yarra Junior Football League.

Old Scotch Soccer Club are located at HA Smith Reserve and compete in the Victorian State League Division 2.

There is a Cricket Club, the Hawthorn Cricket Club and as well as a Hockey Club, the Hawthorn Hockey Club in the suburb.

The suburb also contains two tennis clubs, the Grace Park Tennis Club and the Hawthorn Tennis Club.

== Notable residents ==
Notable people from or who have lived in Hawthorn include:

- Harry Wyatt Wunderly (1892–1971), instrumental in the management and reduction of tuberculosis in Australia.
- Tom Gleisner – television host.
- Ted Baillieu – 46th premier of Victoria
- Tom Allsop – VFL Footballer, grew up in and played for Hawthorn Football Club
- Noah Anderson – AFL Footballer, grew up in Hawthorn
- Simon Holmes à Court – Entrepreneur and founder of Climate 200
- Ahmed Fahour – former Australia Post CEO and businessman
- Andy Lee – Comedian and television host
- John Gardiner (1798–1878) – Pastoralist
- James Frederick Palmer (1803–1871) – first President of the Victorian Legislative Council and Mayor of Melbourne.
- George Swinburne (1861–1928) – engineer, politician and philanthropist, founder of Swinburne University of Technology
- Percy Grainger (1882–1961) – composer
- Fred Williams (1927–1982) – artist
- Michael O'Grady (politician) (1824–1876) – Former Member of the Victorian Legislative Assembly
- Hugh Trumble (1867 – 1938) - cricketer

== Gallery ==
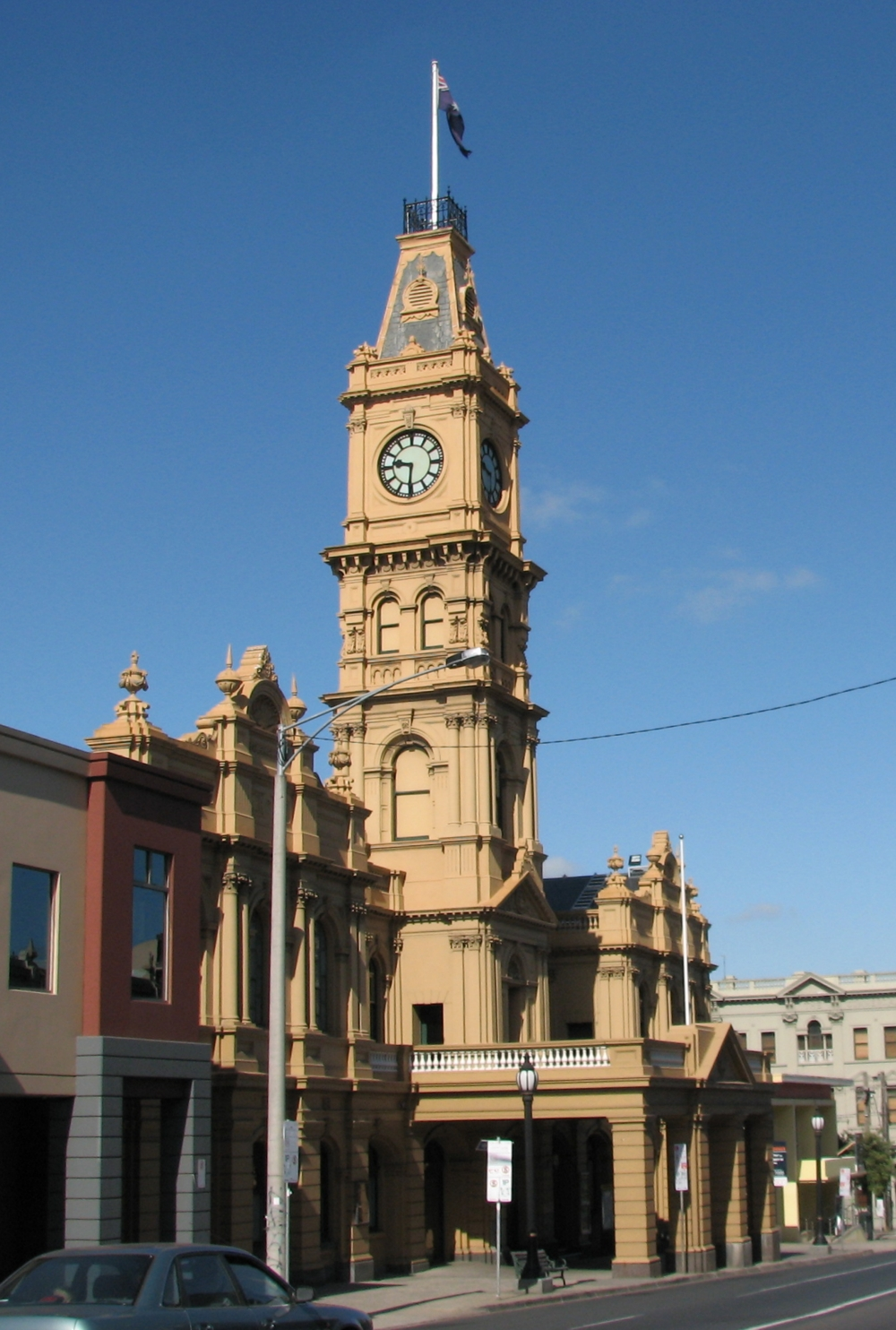
Hawthorn Town Hall

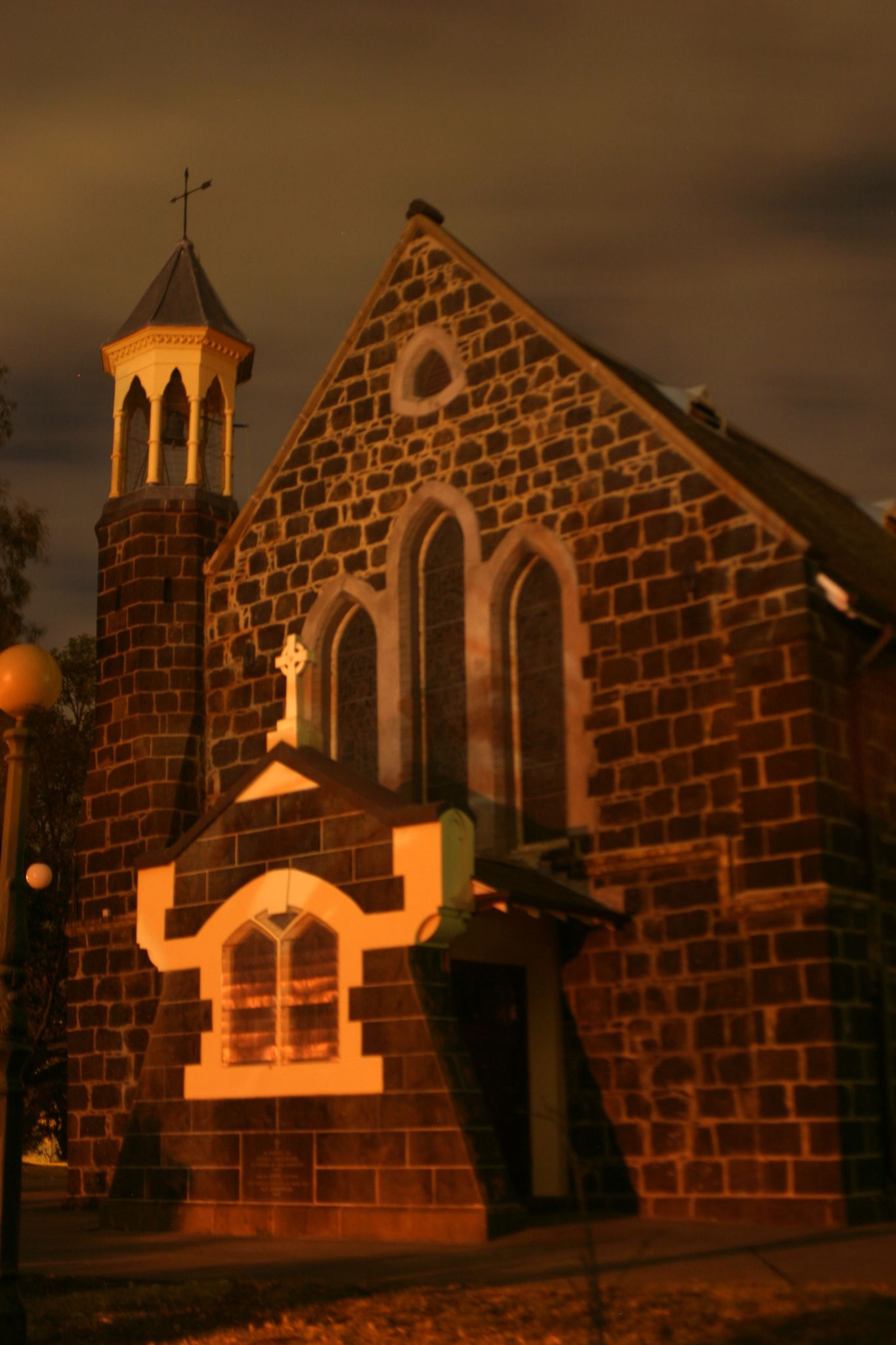
Christ Church, Hawthorn

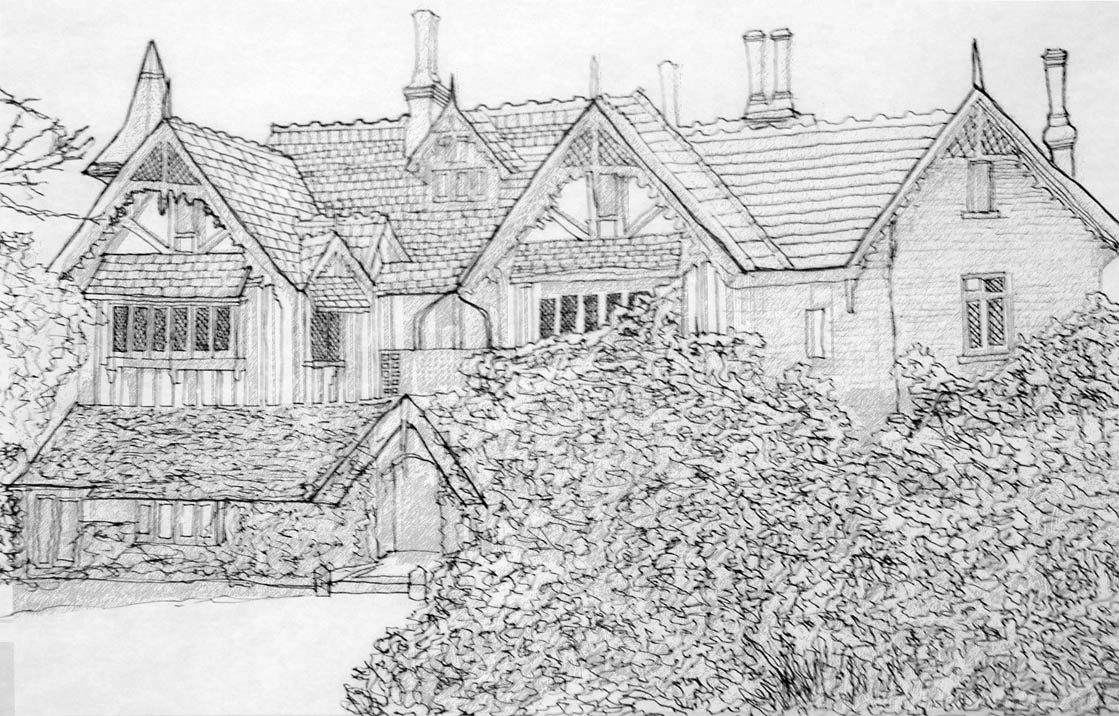
Sketch of Tay Creggan, Hawthorn

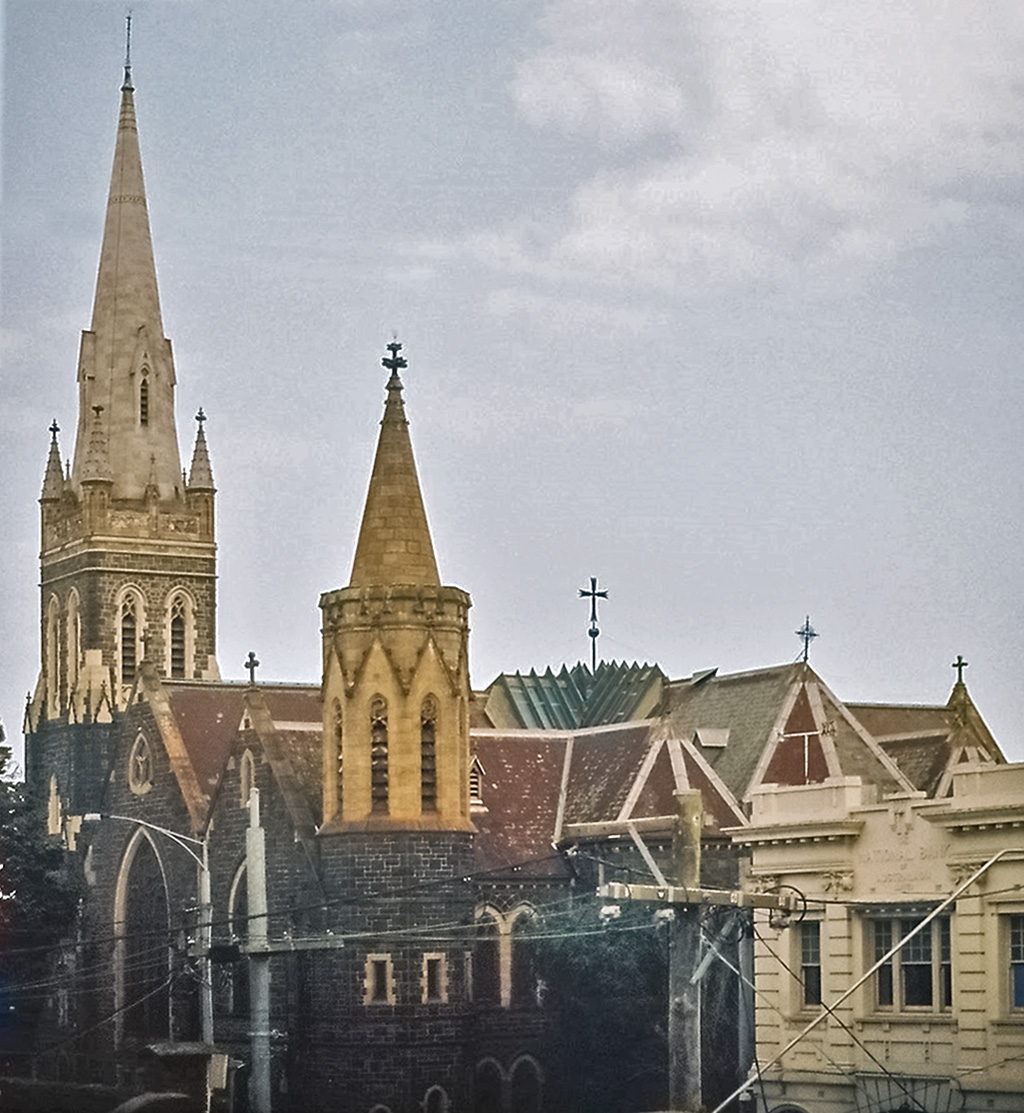
Immaculate Conception Catholic Church near Hawthorn town hall

== See also ==
- City of Hawthorn – Hawthorn was previously within this former local government area.
