= Rossbourne School =

Location
- Hawthorn, Victoria; Australia; 37°49′22″S 145°1′35″E

Information
- Type: Special school
- Motto: Courage and Honour
- Established: 1967
- Founder: Mabel Ross
- Status: Open
- Principal: currently vacant, acting principal Candice Clynk
- Enrollment: 130
- Website: Official website

Rossbourne School is an independent, non denominational, co-educational special school located in Hawthorn, Victoria, Australia, that was founded in 1967. Rossbourne serves students who have had difficulties in mainstream schools due to the demands, both educational and social, of mainstream education. Many of the students have an identifiable learning disability, such as dyslexia, a condition such as ADHD, or an autism-spectrum disorder.

Rossbourne started as a small school, founded by Mabel Ross in the early 1960s, for students struggling with studies. Rossbourne's motto is Courage and Honour, and it caters to approximately 130 students between the ages of 12 and 18 years.

== Curriculum ==
In addition to the usual academic subjects such as English and mathematics, Rossbourne School offers many subjects to prepare students for adult life. These include sport, information technology, and cooking. One subject, known as living skills, teaches students to run a home. Unlike most schools, Rossbourne does not offer the VCE.

== Co-curricular ==
Rossbourne offers several co-curricular activities such as sport and music. The school is a member of the Southern Special Schools Sports Association. Inter-school sport is played on Friday afternoons with a different sport being offered each term. There are also the selective swimming, athletics and snowsports teams. Older students can participate in the Human-Powered Vehicle programme. Several musical ensembles are available, and a musical is performed each year.

== External programmes ==
In the Senior School, students may go to TAFE and take a course in preparation for life after school.

A camp programme is run in each year level. This consists of beach camp for Yr 7 & 8 and surf camp Yr 9 & 10students, and a bi-annual interstate camp for Senior school students. An adventure camp is run in the years that interstate camps do not run. Camps are compulsory and all students have one camp a year, although some may have two or three due to Human-Powered Vehicle and/or snowsports commitments.

== House system ==
The school, unlike most other Australian schools, does not have a house system.

== Associated schools ==
Rossbourne does not have a sister school arrangement, however, it is similar to nearby Andale School for primary students. The school also has a work experience agreement with Xavier College and Hawkesdale P-12 college in regional Victoria.
