= Invergowrie Lodge =

Heritage-listed former gatehouse in Melbourne, Victoria, Australia

- Location of the former gatehouse in Greater Metropolitan Melbourne
- Etymology: Invergowrie, Scotland

General information
- Status: Completed
- Type: Gatehouse; now cottage
- Architectural style: Victorian Picturesque Gothic
- Location: 8 Palmer Place, Hawthorn, City of Boroondara, Melbourne, Victoria, Australia
- Coordinates: 37°49′14″S 145°01′02″E
- Completed: c.1871; 155 years ago
- Client: Sir James Palmer
- Owner: Sir James Palmer (1845–1869); George Coppin (1869–1881)

Technical details
- Material: Bluestone; slate; weatherboard

Victorian Heritage Register
- Official name: Former Invergowrie Lodge
- Type: Registered place
- Designated: 5 May 1982
- Reference no.: VHR H0517
- Heritage overlay no.: HO23
- Categories: Farming and Grazing; Residential buildings (private)

Register of the National Estate
- Official name: Invergowrie Lodge (former)
- Type: Defunct register
- Designated: 21 October 1980
- Reference no.: 16561

Invergowrie Lodge is a former gatehouse located at 8 Palmer Place (Note: also expressed as 8 Burwood Road.) in Hawthorn, in the City of Boroondara, in the inner eastern suburbs of Melbourne, in Victoria, Australia.

Built in c. 1861 – c. 1871 on the traditional lands of the Wurundjeri people, the former gatehouse was added to the Victorian Heritage Register on 5 May 1982 in recognition of its historical and architectural significance; and was also added to the non-statutory and now defunct Register of the National Estate on 21 October 1980.

== History ==
The former Invergowrie Lodge was constructed sometime between the years 1861 and 1871 as a gatehouse to the estate known as Burwood, built and owned by Sir James Palmer, the third Mayor of Melbourne. In 1856, Palmer was elected as the inaugural President of the Legislative Council of Victoria.

It is believed that the gatehouse was erected at the new entry to the estate, formed after the excavation of Burwood Road and the building of the Hawthorn Bridge in c. 1861. Following the death of Palmer in 1871, the estate was acquired by the theatrical entrepreneur, George Coppin, who subdivided the estate and the former gatehouse, renamed as a lodge, was sold as a private house.

== Description ==
The Victorian Picturesque Gothic-style building is constructed of thickly rendered bluestone and has a roof of scalloped slate with carved barge boards to the gable similar in character to those of Invergowrie. It has two rooms on the upper level, an open verandah to the north and an enclosed verandah to the west. A further two rooms are in a semibasement level. Various weatherboard additions have been made at the rear and the interior of the original cottage has been redecorated, although the plan and volumes of the rooms remain.

== See also ==
- Architecture of Melbourne
- List of places on the Victorian Heritage Register in the City of Boroondara
