= City of Boroondara =

Local government area in Victoria, Australia

Coordinates: 37°49′S 145°04′E

- Local government area
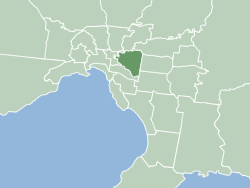
- Map of Melbourne with the City of Boroondara highlighted in dark green

- Interactive map of City of Boroondara
- Country: Australia
- State: Victoria
- Region: Greater Melbourne
- Established: 1994
- Council seat: Camberwell

Government
  - Mayor: Cr Wes Gault
  - State electorates: Ashwood; Hawthorn; Kew
  - Federal divisions: Menzies; Kooyong; Chisholm

Area
  - Total: 60 km^{2} (23 sq mi)

Population
  - Total: 167,231 (2021 census) (31st)
  - Density: 2,790/km^{2} (7,200/sq mi)
- Website: City of Boroondara
LGAs around City of Boroondara
Yarra	Banyule	Manningham
Yarra	City of Boroondara	Whitehorse
Stonnington	Stonnington	Monash

The City of Boroondara (/bɒrənˈdɑːrə/) is a local government area in Victoria, Australia. It is located in the eastern suburbs of Melbourne. It was formed in June 1994 from the amalgamation of the Cities of Kew, Camberwell and Hawthorn.

It has an area of 60 square kilometres (23 sq mi). In the 2021 Census the city had a population of 167,903.

City of Boroondara participates in the Victorian Government's state-wide, Local Government Community Satisfaction Survey. This is conducted annually by an independent research company, JWS Research. In 2022 City of Boroondara achieved an index score of 71 on ‘Overall Performance’. This is significantly higher than the average ratings for metropolitan councils (index score of 65) and the state-wide average (index score of 59) and places Boroondara in the top-performing councils metro and state-wide.

== History ==
This area was originally occupied by the Wurundjeri Indigenous Australians of the Kulin nation.

In 1837, John Gardiner (after whom Gardiners Creek was named) and his family were the first Europeans to settle in the area. Robert Hoddle surveyed the area in 1837 and declared it the "Parish of Boroondara". The area was densely wooded, so he took a word from the Woiwurrung language (as spoken by the Wurundjeri), meaning "where the ground is thickly shaded".

The first Local Government body was the Boroondara District Road Board, formed on 11 July 1854 and incorporating the areas which were to become the City of Hawthorn, City of Kew and City of Camberwell. Hawthorn and Kew were created as separate municipalities in 1860 and the remaining area of the Road Board became the Shire of Boroondara on 17 November 1871, which later became the City of Camberwell.

In the 1990s, the City of Hawthorn, the City of Kew and the western part of the City of Camberwell were originally planned to be amalgamated to form the "City of Riversdale". The three municipalities, including the whole of the City of Camberwell, were eventually amalgamated in June 1994 to create the City of Boroondara. Existing councillors from the three municipalities were replaced initially by three commissioners - David Glanville (chair), David Thomas and Marion Macleod. The commissioners were in turn replaced by ten councillors following elections in 1996.

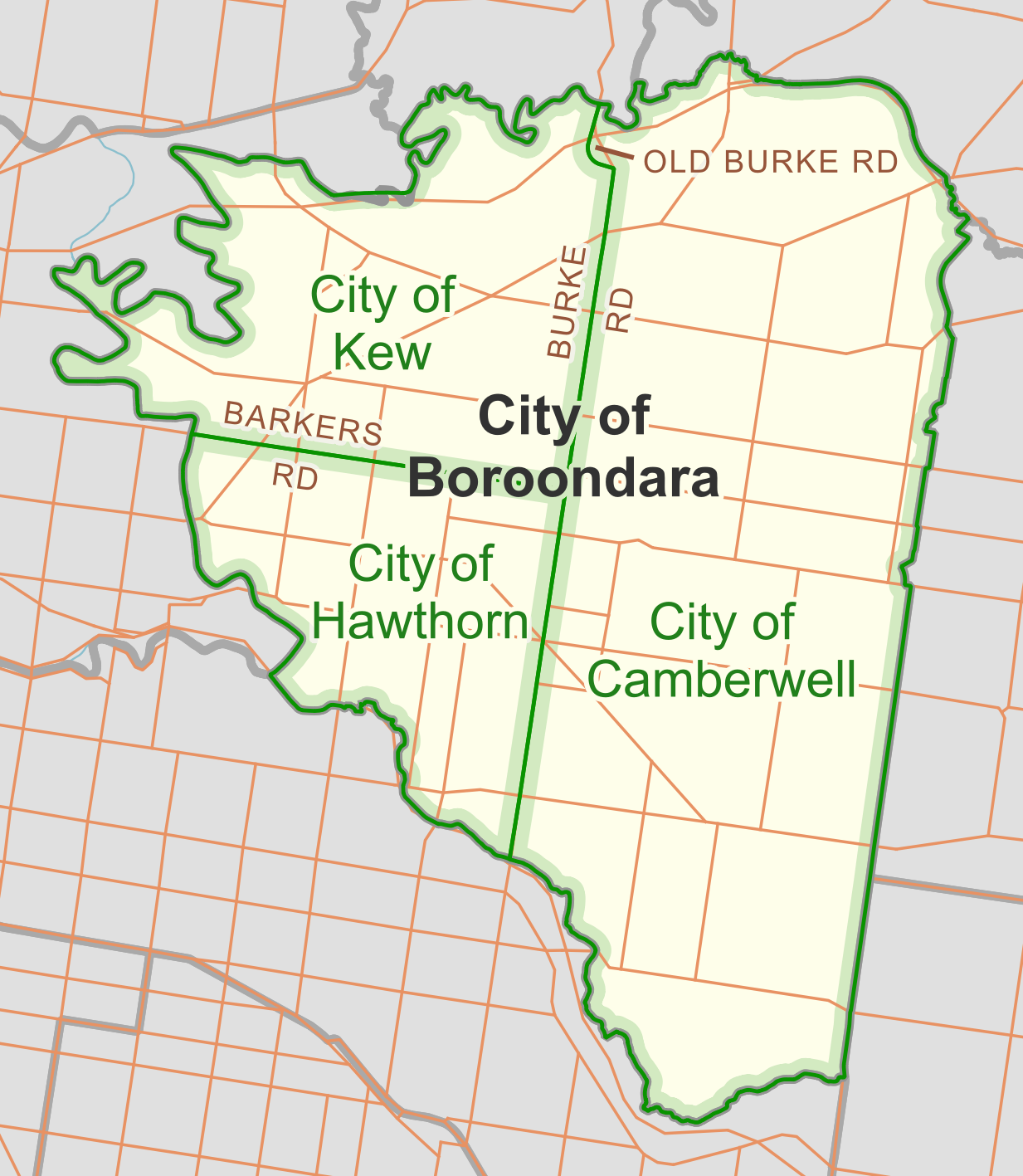
The City's predecessor LGAs (green) as they were in 1994

== Council ==
Boroondara City Council is the third tier of government and deals with services such as waste and recycling collection, leisure centres, building and planning permits and approvals, roads, drainage, health services, youth services, children's services, food safety, parks and gardens, library services, pets, street parking permits and the collection of rates and charges.

=== Current composition and election method ===
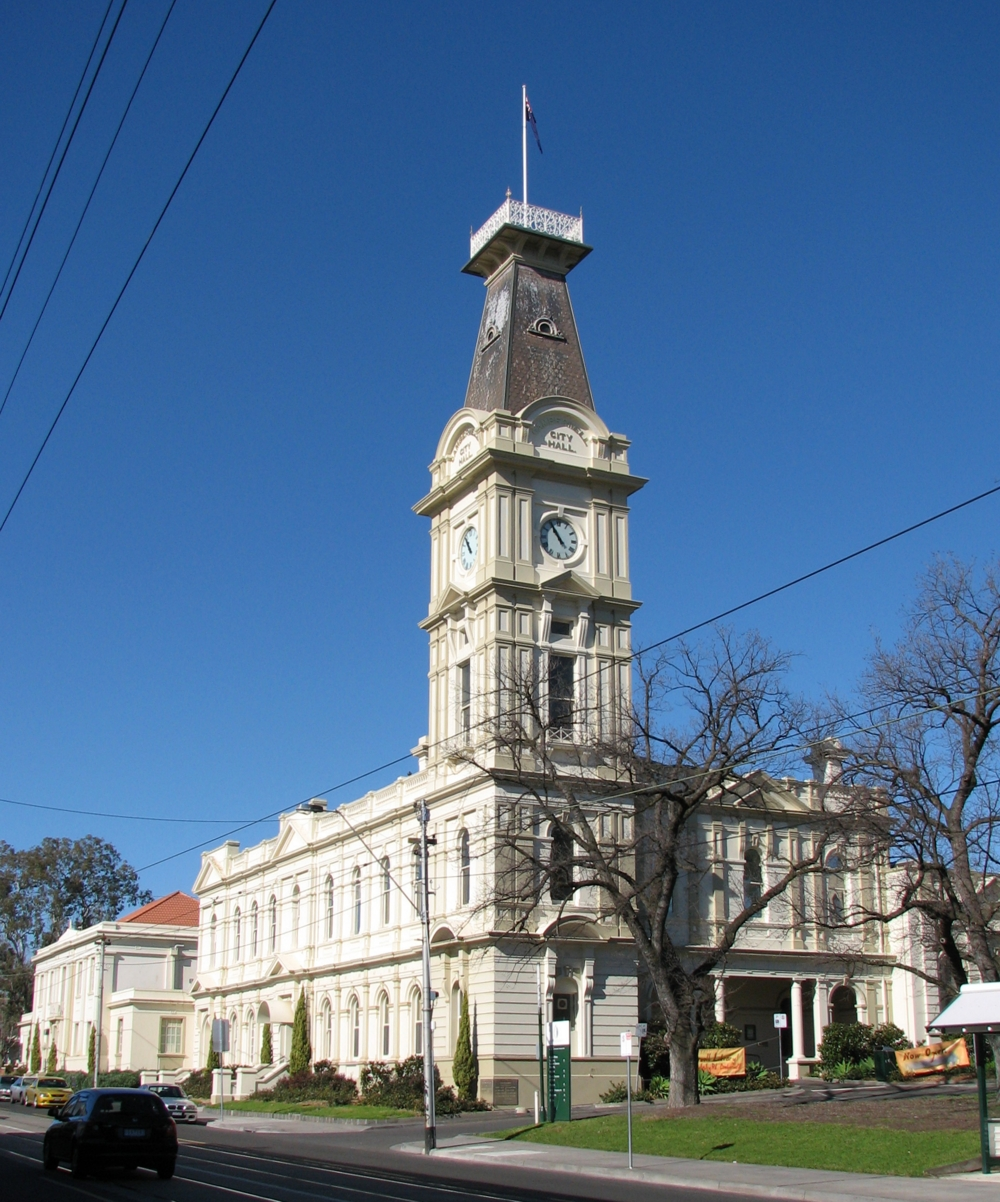
The Camberwell Town Hall.

Boroondara City Council is composed of eleven councillors, each representing one of eleven wards. On Thursday 9 July 2020, the Minister for Local Government formally announced a change to Boroondara's electoral structure. This change follows a review by the Victorian Electoral Commission (VEC), which was completed in June 2019. This change included an increase in ward and councillor numbers from 10 to 11. The new 11th ward is named Riversdale Ward, and is located to the south-west where it shares a boundary with Glenferrie, Junction and Gardiner Wards. This addition resulted in a number of boundary changes across the municipality.

In 2020, the COVID-19 pandemic threatened to disrupt the local elections, with some arguing that the inability to campaign in-person would benefit incumbents with name-recognition, or resource rich candidates who could invest in letter box campaigns with leaflets. A decision was made, on public health grounds, that it was safe to proceed with the elections and voters were only able to return their ballots via postal voting.

All councillors are elected for a fixed four-year term of office, with the most recent election being held in October 2024. Councillors were sworn in at a Special Meeting of Council on Monday 11 November 2024. On the 17th of November 2025, Wes Gault was elected Mayor, and Shima Ibuki his Deputy, by the Council.

Party	Councillors
Independent	8
Independent Liberal	1
Greens	2
Total	11

Ward	Party	Name	Years as Councillor	Roles
Bellevue	Independent	Michael Nolan	2024-present	
Cotham	Independent Liberal	Felicity Sinfield	2012-present	
Gardiner	Independent	Victor Franco	2020-present	Chair of the Urban Planning Delegated Committee
Glenferrie	Greens	Wes Gault	2020-present	Mayor
Junction	Independent	Mal Osborne-Smith	2024-present	
Lynden	Independent	Lisa Hollingsworth	2016-present	
Maling	Independent	Shima Ibuki	2024-present	Deputy Mayor
Maranoa	Independent	Chris Pattas	1996-2004, 2024-present	
Riversdale	Independent	Rob Baillieu	2024-present	Chair of the Services Delegated Committee
Solway	Greens	John Friend-Pereira	2024-present	
Studley	Independent	Sophie Torney	2024-present	

=== Mayors ===
Party	Mayor	Term
Liberal	Geoff Hayes	1996–1997
Independent	Keith Walter	1997–1998
Independent	Loreto Davey	1998–2000
Independent	Chris Pattas	2000–2001
Liberal	Meredith Butler	2001–2003
Independent	Judith Voce	2003–2004
Independent	Jack Wegman	2004–2006
Liberal	Phillip Healey	2006–2007
Independent	Coral Ross	2007–2008
Independent	Jack Wegman	2008–2010
Liberal	Nicholas Tragas	2010–2011
Independent	Heinz Kreutz	2011–2012
Independent	Jack Wegman	2012–2013
Independent	Coral Ross	2013–2015
Independent	Jim Parke	2015–2016
Liberal	Phillip Healey	2016–2017
Independent	Jim Parke	2017–2018
Independent	Jane Addis	2018–2019
Liberal	Cynthia Watson	2019–2020
Independent	Garry Thompson	2020–2021
Independent	Jane Addis	2021–2022
Liberal	Felicity Sinfield	2022–2023
Independent	Lisa Hollingsworth	2023–2024
Independent	Sophie Torney	2024–2025
Greens	Wes Gault	2025–present

== Past Councillors ==
=== 1996−present ===
Year	Bellevue	Cotham	Gardiner	Glenferrie	Junction	Lynden	Maling	Maranoa	Riversdale	Solway	Studley
Year	Councillor	Councillor	Councillor	Councillor	Councillor	Councillor	Councillor	Councillor	Councillor	Councillor	Councillor
1996	Eric Risstrom (Ind.)	Geoff Hayes (Liberal)	Will Charlton (Ind.)	Nigel Kirby (Ind.)	Lilian Weinberg (Ind.)	Ian Wallace (Ind.)	Loreto Davey (Ind.)	Chris Pattas (Ind.)	10 wards (1996−2020)	Keith Walter (Ind.)	Paula Davey (Liberal)
1999	Eric Risstrom (Ind.)	Geoff Hayes (Liberal)	Will Charlton (Ind.)	Meredith Butler (Liberal)	Martina Hayes (Ind.)	Ian Wallace (Ind.)	Loreto Davey (Ind.)	Chris Pattas (Ind.)	10 wards (1996−2020)	Keith Walter (Ind.)	Judith Voce (Ind.)
2002	Eric Risstrom (Ind.)	Geoff Hayes (Liberal)	Coral Ross (Ind.)	Meredith Butler (Liberal)	Jack Wegman (Ind.)	Heinz Kreutz (Ind.)	Dennis Whelan (Ind.)	Chris Pattas (Ind.)	10 wards (1996−2020)	Keith Walter (Ind.)	Judith Voce (Ind.)
2003	Gina Goldsmith (Ind.)	Geoff Hayes (Liberal)	Coral Ross (Ind.)	Meredith Butler (Liberal)	Jack Wegman (Ind.)	Heinz Kreutz (Ind.)	Dennis Whelan (Ind.)	Chris Pattas (Ind.)	10 wards (1996−2020)	Keith Walter (Ind.)	Judith Voce (Ind.)
2004	Gina Goldsmith (Liberal)	Lachlan Williams (Liberal)	Coral Ross (Ind.)	Meredith Butler (Liberal)	Jack Wegman (Ind.)	Heinz Kreutz (Ind.)	Dick Menting (Ind.)	Nicholas Tragas (Liberal)	10 wards (1996−2020)	Mary Halikias-Byrnes (Labor)	Phillip Healey (Liberal)
2007	Gina Goldsmith (Liberal)	Phil Meggs (Ind.)	Coral Ross (Ind.)	Meredith Butler (Liberal)	Jack Wegman (Ind.)	Heinz Kreutz (Ind.)	Dick Menting (Ind.)	Nicholas Tragas (Liberal)	10 wards (1996−2020)	Mary Halikias-Byrnes (Labor)	Phillip Healey (Liberal)
2008	Brad Miles (Ind.)	David Bloom (Liberal)	Coral Ross (Ind.)	Phil Meggs (Ind.)	Jack Wegman (Ind.)	Heinz Kreutz (Ind.)	Dick Menting (Ind.)	Nicholas Tragas (Liberal)	10 wards (1996−2020)	Kevin Chow (Labor)	Phillip Healey (Liberal)
2012	Jim Parke (Ind.)	Felicity Sinfield (Liberal)	Coral Ross (Ind.)	Steve Hurd (Ind. Labor)	Jack Wegman (Ind.)	Heinz Kreutz (Ind.)	Jane Addis (Ind.)	Philip Mallis (Ind.)	10 wards (1996−2020)	Kevin Chow (Labor)	Phillip Healey (Liberal)
2016	Jim Parke (Ind.)	Felicity Sinfield (Liberal)	Coral Ross (Ind.)	Steve Hurd (Ind. Labor)	Jack Wegman (Ind.)	Lisa Hollingsworth (Liberal/Ind.)	Jane Addis (Ind.)	Cynthia Watson (Liberal)	10 wards (1996−2020)	Garry Thompson (Liberal/Ind.)	Phillip Healey (Liberal)
2020	Jim Parke (Ind.)	Felicity Sinfield (Liberal)	Victor Franco (Ind.)	Wes Gault (Greens)	Di Gillies (Ind.)	Lisa Hollingsworth (Liberal/Ind.)	Jane Addis (Ind.)	Cynthia Watson (Liberal)	Susan Biggar (Ind.)	Garry Thompson (Liberal/Ind.)	Nick Stavrou (Liberal)
2021	Jim Parke (Ind.)	Felicity Sinfield (Liberal)	Victor Franco (Ind.)	Wes Gault (Greens)	Di Gillies (Ind.)	Lisa Hollingsworth (Liberal/Ind.)	Jane Addis (Ind.)	Cynthia Watson (Liberal)	Susan Biggar (Ind.)	Garry Thompson (Liberal/Ind.)	Nick Stavrou (Liberal)
2024	Michael Nolan (Ind.)	Felicity Sinfield (Liberal)	Victor Franco (Ind.)	Wes Gault (Greens)	Mal Osborne-Smith (Ind.)	Lisa Hollingsworth (Liberal/Ind.)	Shima Ibuki (Ind.)	Chris Pattas (Ind.)	Rob Baillieu (Ind.)	John Friend-Pereira (Greens)	Sophie Torney (Ind.)

== Election results ==
=== 2024 ===
2024 Victorian local elections: Boroondara
Party	Votes	%	Swing	Seats	Change
Independents	55,852	57.70	+0.34	8	▲3
Independent Liberal	27,946	28.87	–3.73 (Note: Compared to the combined Independent Liberal and Burwood Liberals result at the 2020 election.)	1	▼4
Greens	8,155	8.42	+2.99	2	▲1
Independent Labor	3,323	3.43	+1.75	0	Steady
Victorian Socialists	1,523	1.57	+1.57	0	Steady
Formal votes	96,799	98.01	+0.16		
Informal votes	1,962	1.99	–0.16		
Total	98,761	100.00		11	
Registered voters / turnout	117,377	84.14			

== Townships and localities ==
At the 2021 census, the city had a population of 167,900, down from 167,231 in the 2016 census.

Population
Locality	2016	2021
Ashburton	7,751	7,952
Balwyn	13,312	13,495
Balwyn North^	20,406	21,302
Camberwell	22,081	21,965
Canterbury	8,056	7,800
Deepdene	2,035	2,101
Glen Iris^	25,268	26,131
Hawthorn	23,511	22,322
Hawthorn East	14,321	14,834
Kew	24,605	24,499
Kew East	6,635	6,620
Mont Albert^	4,840	4,948
Surrey Hills^	13,605	13,655

^ - Territory divided with another LGA

== Infrastructure ==
The council is responsible for the management of stormwater collection and removal. The water supply authority is Yarra Valley Water.

== Libraries ==
The City of Boroondara has five libraries at Camberwell, Ashburton, Balwyn, Kew and Hawthorn, and in 2018 opened a 'library lounge' at the Greythorn Community Hub in Balwyn North.

== Local area ==
=== Schools ===
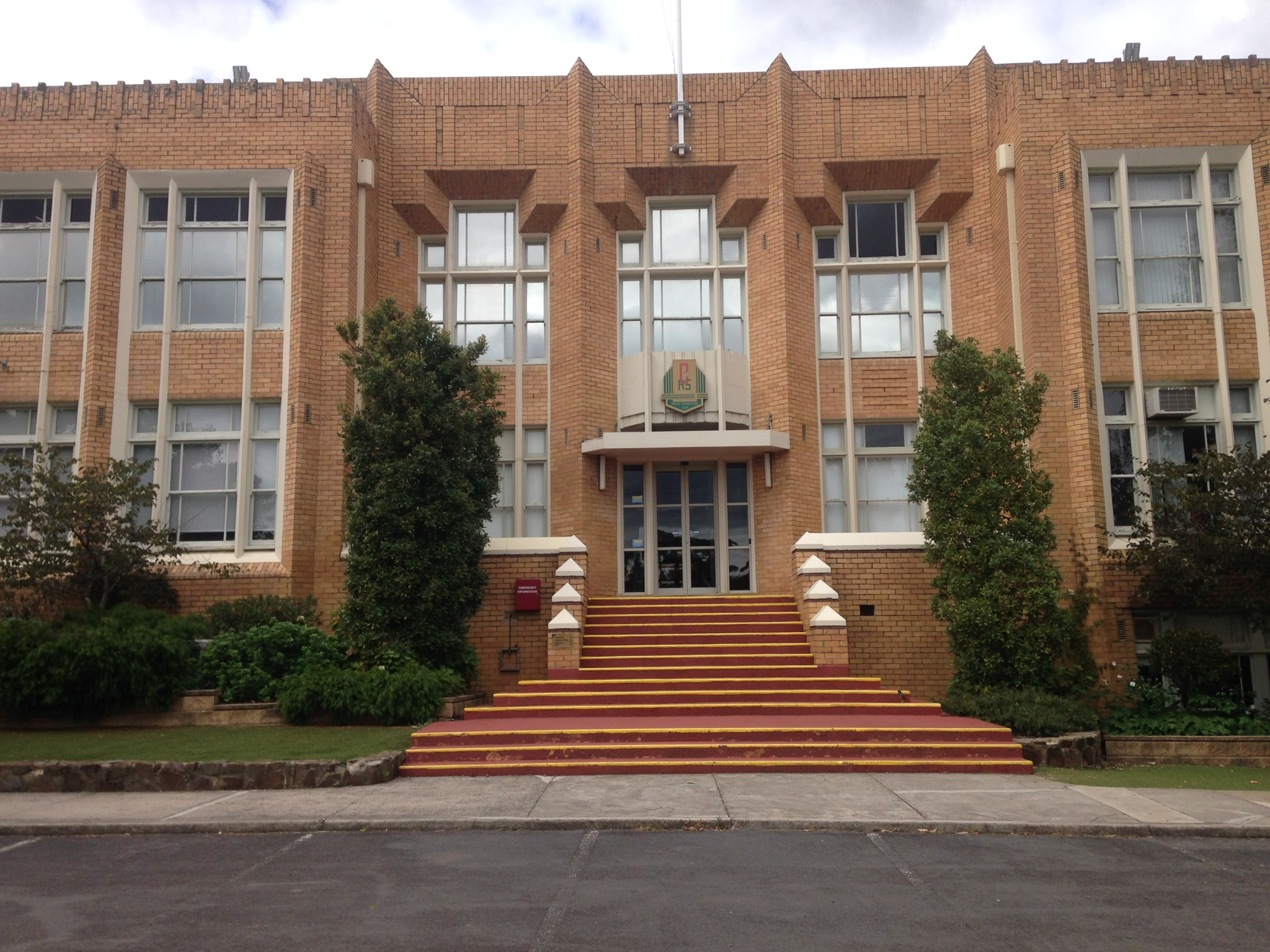
Camberwell High School, one of the City of Boroondara's secondary schools

Boroondara has one of the highest concentrations of students in Australia and contains many private schools, including Xavier College, Methodist Ladies' College (MLC), Strathcona Baptist Girls' Grammar School, Camberwell Grammar School, Trinity Grammar School, Ruyton Girls' School, Rossbourne School, Carey Baptist Grammar School, Scotch College, Fintona Girls' School, Genazzano FCJ College, Preshil, and Alia College. It contains Catholic schools such as St Michael's Parish School (Ashburton) Our Lady of Good Counsel (Deepdene) and St Bede's School (Balwyn North) and a number of public schools, including Canterbury Girls' Secondary College, Balwyn High School, Kew High School, Auburn High School and Camberwell High School.

== Heritage controversy ==
In 2023, Boroondara implemented a "community heritage nomination process", allowing residents to lodge nominations for properties to be heritage listed, limiting the ability for the owners of those properties to renovate or demolish their property. The community nominated eight properties to heritage list, seven of which were listed without the consent of the owner. This was a highly controversial change, and some residents were concerned that the process would be weaponised by community members to heritage list properties owned by people in ethnic minorities. The council rejected a proposal to pause the process until the next council election.

== See also ==
- List of Melbourne suburbs
