= Rialto building group, Melbourne =

Group of historic buildings in Australia

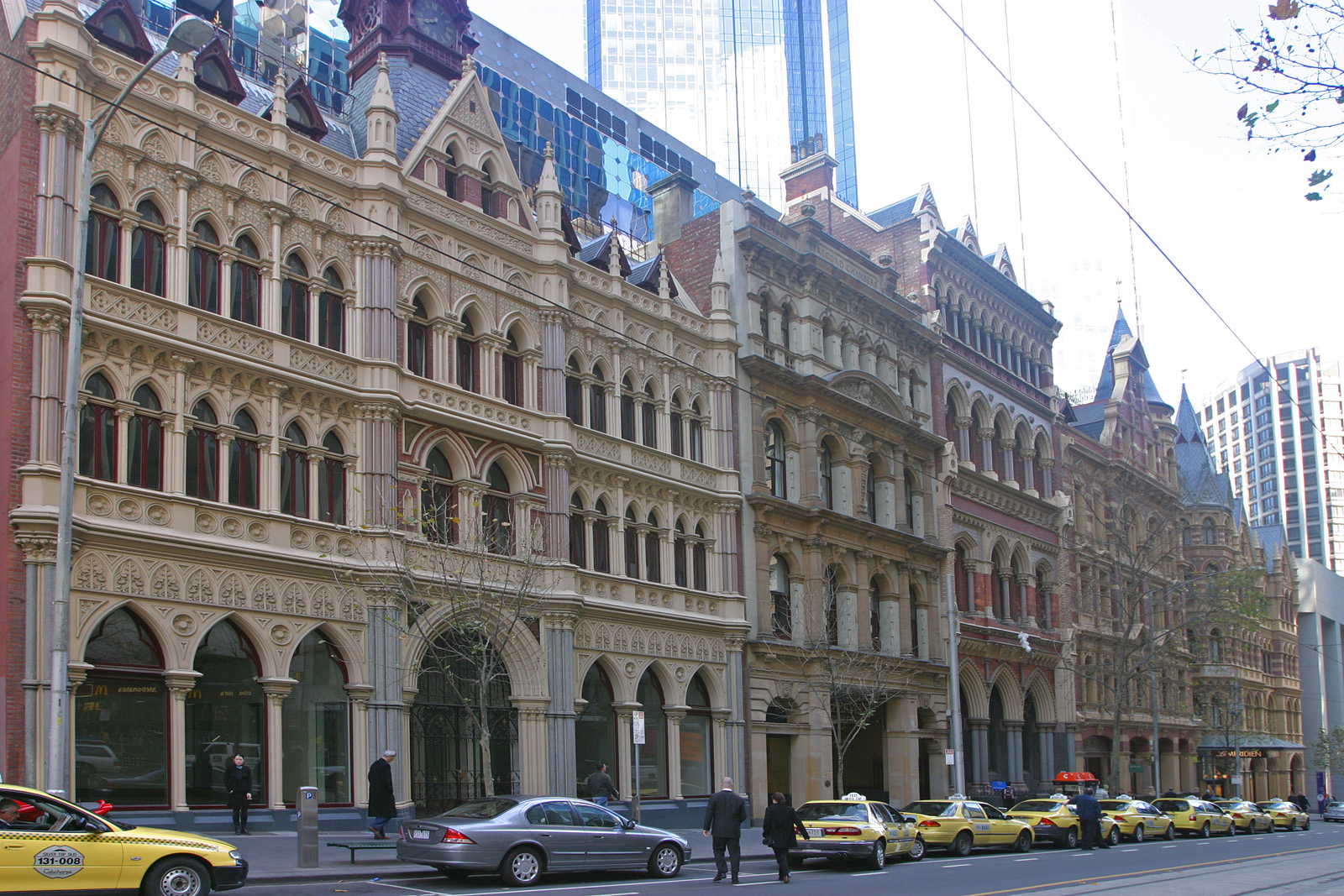
From left: the Olderfleet Building, Record Chambers, New Zealand Chambers, Winfield Building and Rialto Building, 2003

The Rialto, Winfield and Olderfleet building group on Collins Street, Melbourne, Australia, is a group of five historic Boom style buildings built between 1888 and 1891. They share similar heights, widths and levels of detail, making up one of the most notable historic streetscapes in Melbourne, and a particularly notable Victorian streetscape internationally. All the buildings were subject to preservation battles in the 1970s and early 1980s, ultimately saving the front portions of four of them, and the whole of one of them, the Rialto Building.

== History ==
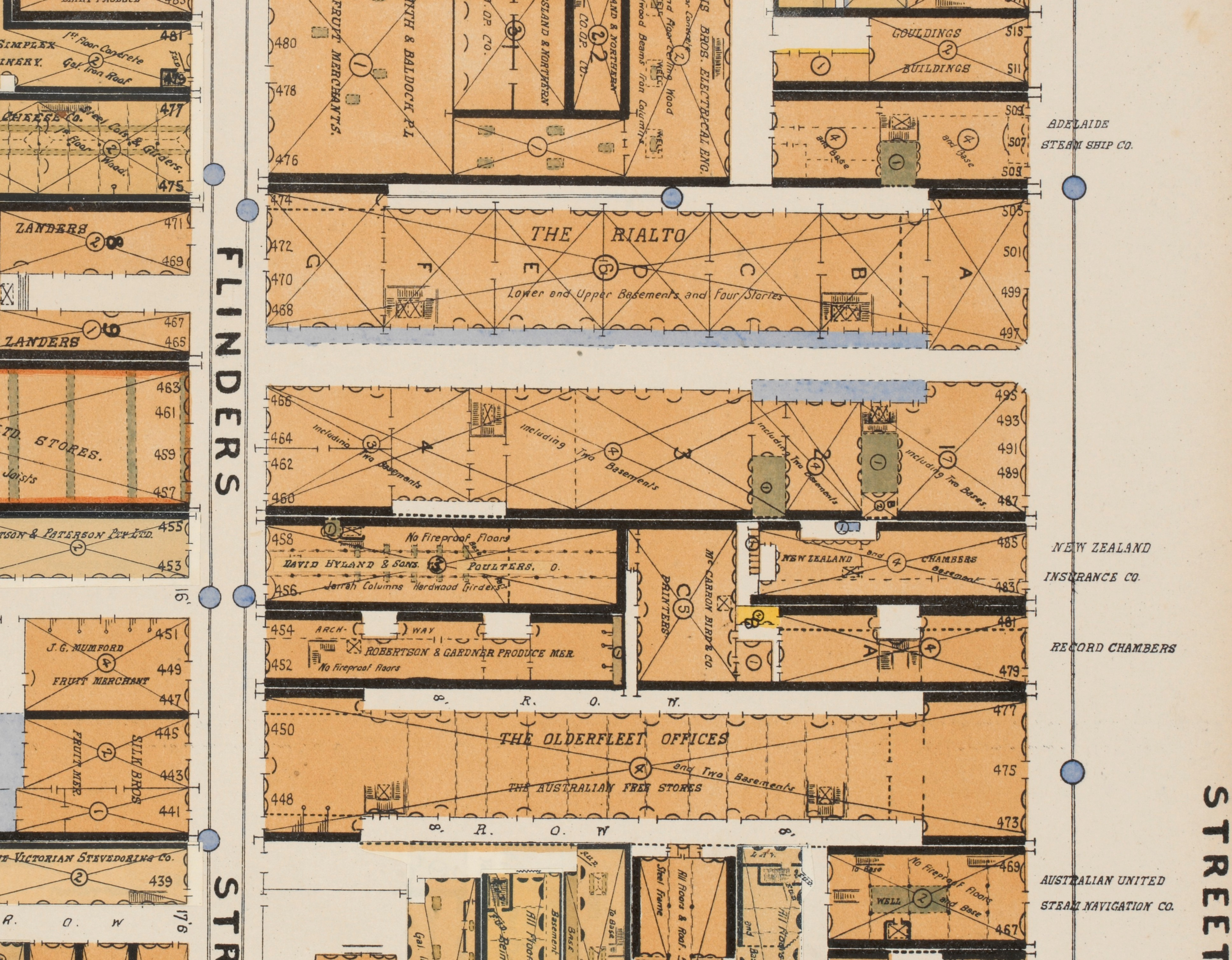
Map of Rialto Group buildings from 1923

The group of buildings was built within a short period of time, for different owners by different architects. The Record Chambers and New Zealand Chambers were both built in 1887, followed by the Olderfleet in 1890, and the Winfield and Rialto buildings in 1891. The two ends, Olderfleet and Rialto, were both built for the same developer, Patrick McCaughan, by the same architect William Pitt, both in Gothic Revival style, and both stretched back to Flinders Lane with a front office portion, and storerooms to the rear over multiple levels.

Just prior to this in 1885, just to the west on the corner of Collins and King Streets, the huge Robbs Building had been built as speculative offices, in a broadly Renaissance Revival style, and in 1888 the even larger Federal Coffee Palace was built on the opposite King Street corner (also designed in part by William Pitt). The tall corner dome of the Coffee Palace was visible in the view along Collins Street from in front of the Olderfleet, creating one of the most striking streetscapes in the city.

In the period following World War II, this streetscape was a subject for photographers such as Jack Cato in 1949, and JT Collins and Mark Strizic in the 1960s.

=== Preservation battles ===
The Rialto story began in 1972 as a comedy of errors: it deepened by the late 1970s into a tragedy of blighted hopes and missed opportunities; it concluded in the early 1980s on a note of farce.

Graeme Davison, Marrying History with the Future: The Rialto Story, 1987

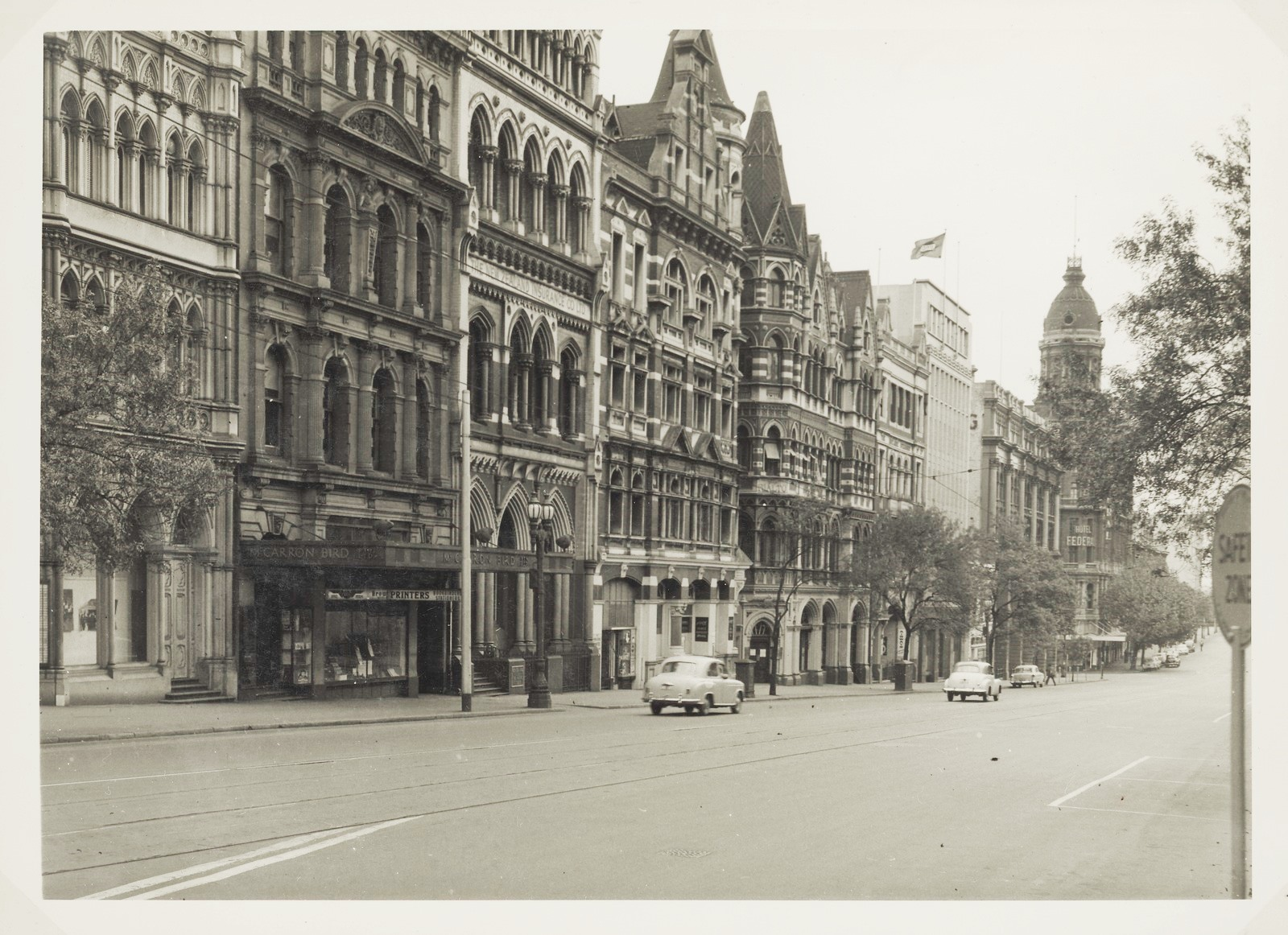
Rialto Group with the Federal Coffee Palace in the background, 1950s

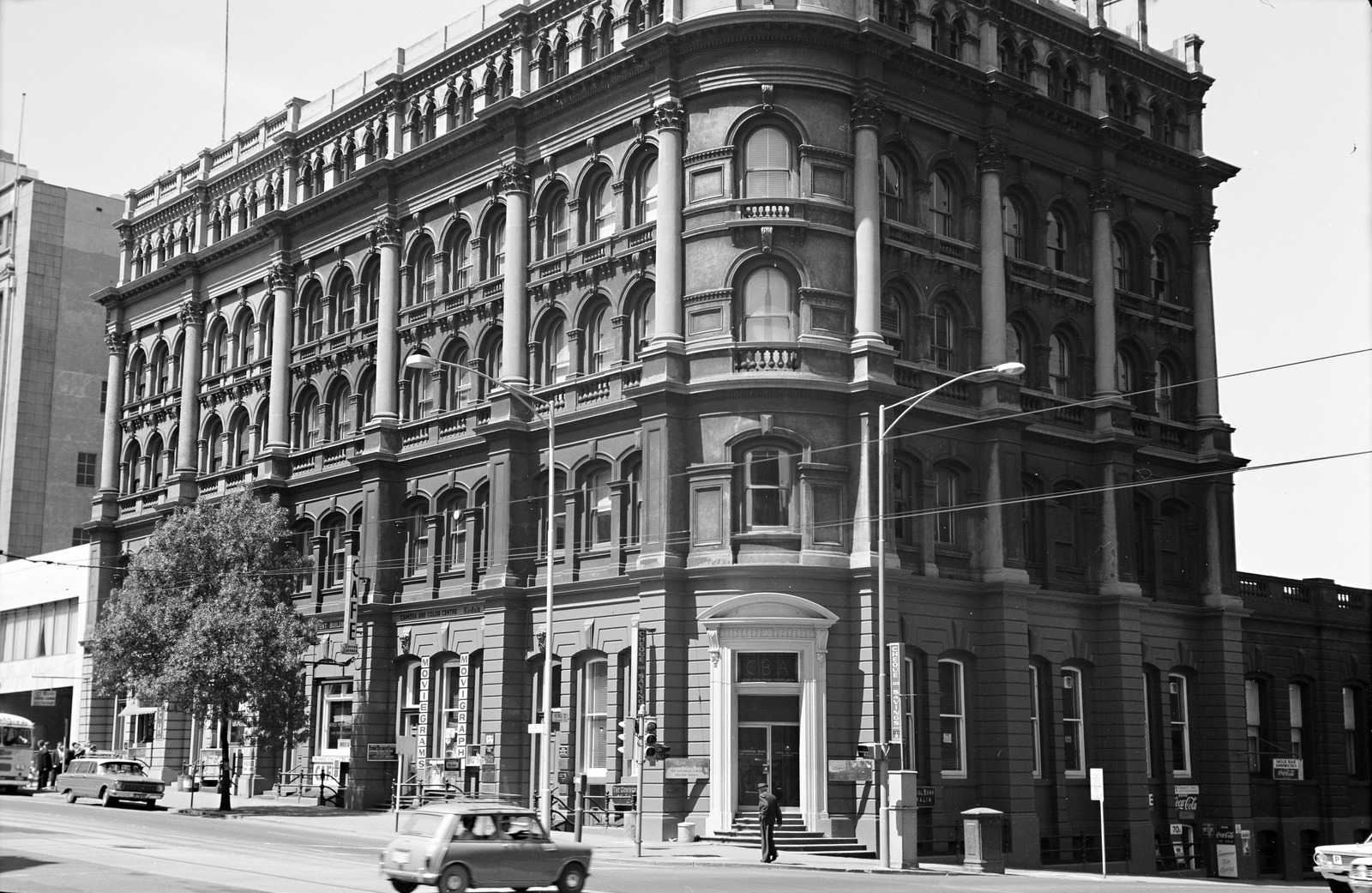
Robbs Building in 1968

As part of the huge growth in speculative office development in the 1960s, institutional investor National Mutual purchased the Winfield and Rialto and most of the adjacent buildings back to Flinders Lane with a view to future redevelopment in the late 1960s, while in 1971 Hammerson purchased the Olderfleet and the adjacent Record Chambers and New Zealand Chambers. Perhaps prompted by this, the Victorian chapter of the National Trust listed the Olderfleet in the same year, and in 1973 listed the Rialto. The Trust also began to advocate for the protection of streetscapes, not just individual buildings, and the same year listed all five buildings as a group, along with the Edwardian era Adelaide Steamship (by noted architect Charles D’Ebro), and the Interwar Phosphate House, both to the west of the Rialto. In September 1974 Hammerson demolished all but the front section of the Olderfleet, which they pledged to preserve, but was reportedly going to demolish the other buildings they owned, and the battle to preserve the buildings began.

The next major step was that in October 1974, the newly formed Historic Buildings Preservation Council (now Heritage Victoria) listed their first 100 buildings, amongst them all five of the 19th-century Olderfleet / Rialto group buildings (minus the already demolished rear of the Olderfleet). In about 1975 the two eastern bays of Robbs building were demolished, and the Trust then classified the remaining corner section. With threats to various heritage buildings emerging along Collins Street, a new heritage group, the Collins Street Defence Movement, was formed in 1976, and advocated for wholistic retention rather than compromises.

The Adelaide Steamship building was demolished in 1977, without much protest, while debates over the sites continued.

In 1978 National Mutual successfully applied for a permit to demolish all but the front 14m of the Winfield, and while that was underway applied to demolish the bulk of the Rialto as well. By this time, they also owned the Robbs building, which they also wanted to demolish. The National Trust and the Collins Street Defence Movement opposed the demolition of Robbs on the grounds that it had considerable streetscape importance as an anchor for the land boom Gothic buildings in Collins Street and the bluestone warehouses along King Street, an argument also supported by the Historic Buildings Preservation Council (though they did not officially list it). In 1979, the Victorian State Government called on an international expert to prepare a comprehensive scheme, which found the complex "possibly of world significance" and recommended a mix of offices, shops and pedestrian areas. A scheme that preserved the Rialto as part of a convention centre and casino was also discussed at this time, but the Victorian State Government was uncertain about allowing a casino.

In January 1981, National Mutual sold the site to the Grollo Group, in a joint venture with St Martin's Properties, who soon revealed plans for a trio of high rise office towers, including one on the corner replacing Robbs, supported on piers through the York Butter Factory, a 19th-century warehouse on King Street. This plan was stymied when the Builders Labourer's Federation (BLF) placed a ban on the demolition of Robbs. Grollo also developed the idea of a hotel incorporating the Rialto and Winfield buildings in consultation with the National Trust.

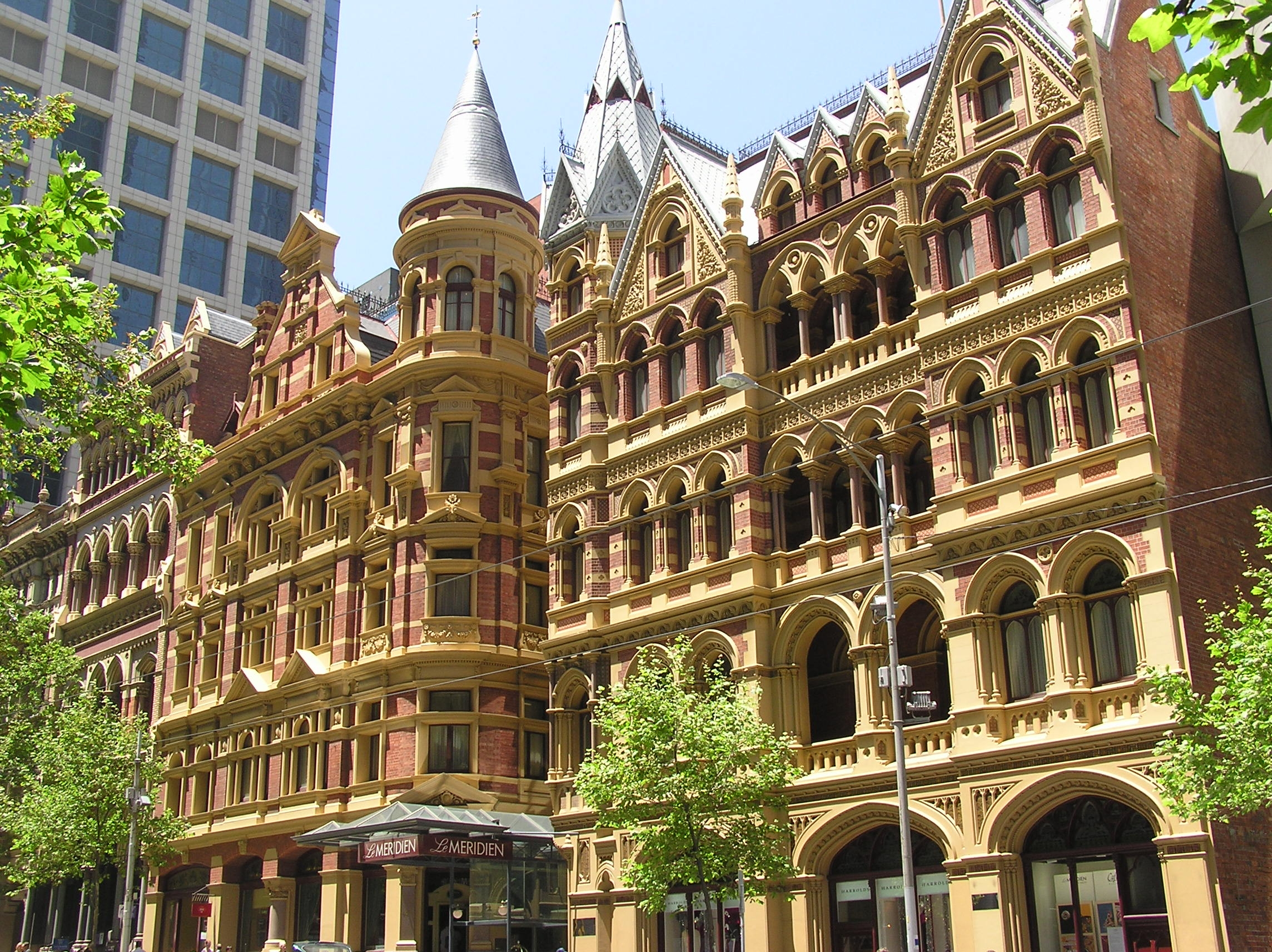
The Winfield and Rialto Buildings combined as hotel (2007)

Then in November 1981, the BLF lifted their ban, with the demolition of Robbs commencing immediately, much to the dismay of the National Trust Chairman Rodney Davidson. Two weeks later the State Government approved a two-tower scheme, sparing the York Butter Factory, but still involving the demolition of the Robbs building. In December, four members of the Trust's Urban Conservation Committee resigned in protest at what they saw as approval of the scheme by Rodney Davidson, who said "We're not completely happy, but its not a bad result given 15 year history of the site." At 55 floors, the taller of the two Rialto office towers was to be the tallest in Australia. The project then forged ahead, and was completed in October 1986. The site of the Robbs building became an open plaza.

The plan also envisaged the hotel would go ahead, utilising the rear wing of the Rialto and a new rear wing behind the Winfield, in an atrium style development. According to Gerry De Prue, architect for both projects, the cobblestones of Winfield Square laneway were taken up and carefully numbered, but the numbers washed off in the rain (they went back in place much as before, but those under the atrium are now hidden). The hotel opened in 1984 as the Menzies at Rialto, but the corrugated iron urinal encloses at the south ends of the open galleries were not restored in a kind of protest at having to retain them. The requirement to keep them reflected an emerging preservationist philosophy that valued social history as well as architectural style.

Meanwhile, Hammerson had not advanced any proposals for the Olderfleet site, and sold it to Becton Corporation in 1981, who planned a 33 level tower behind retained frontages of the Olderfleet Building, Record Chambers, and New Zealand Chambers of 10–12m. Ultimately they went ahead with a reduced 7 level scheme, known as the Olderfleet, completed in 1985, when it became home to the State Government Department of Planning. During the restoration works, the clock in the Olderfleet turret, which had been stolen in 1980, was returned.

=== Recent history ===
In 2015–17, the forecourt of the Rialto Towers was rebuilt with a podium of office space, creating a continuous streetscape to King Street again, albeit in modern forms.

The hotel in the Winfield and Rialto buildings became part of the InterContinental Hotel Group in 2008, and was extensively refurbished, whilst not changing the heritage structures, and it is called the "InterContinental Melbourne The Rialto". In 2015, the hotel was purchased by the Salter Brothers.

In 2018–2020, the office building behind the Olderfleet Building was demolished – along with a carpark structure behind that – and replaced by a 40 level office tower designed by Grimshaw Architects, with an atrium space behind the retained portions of the historic buildings which were again restored.

In late 2023, Salter proposed a redevelopment of the Rialto hotel that involved the demolition of the 1984 rear wing of the Winfield Building with a 35 storey office and hotel tower that would cantilever out over the rear wing of the Rialto Building. The proposal was approved by the City of Melbourne, and Heritage Victoria in early 2024, and the Minister for Planning in June.

== Buildings ==
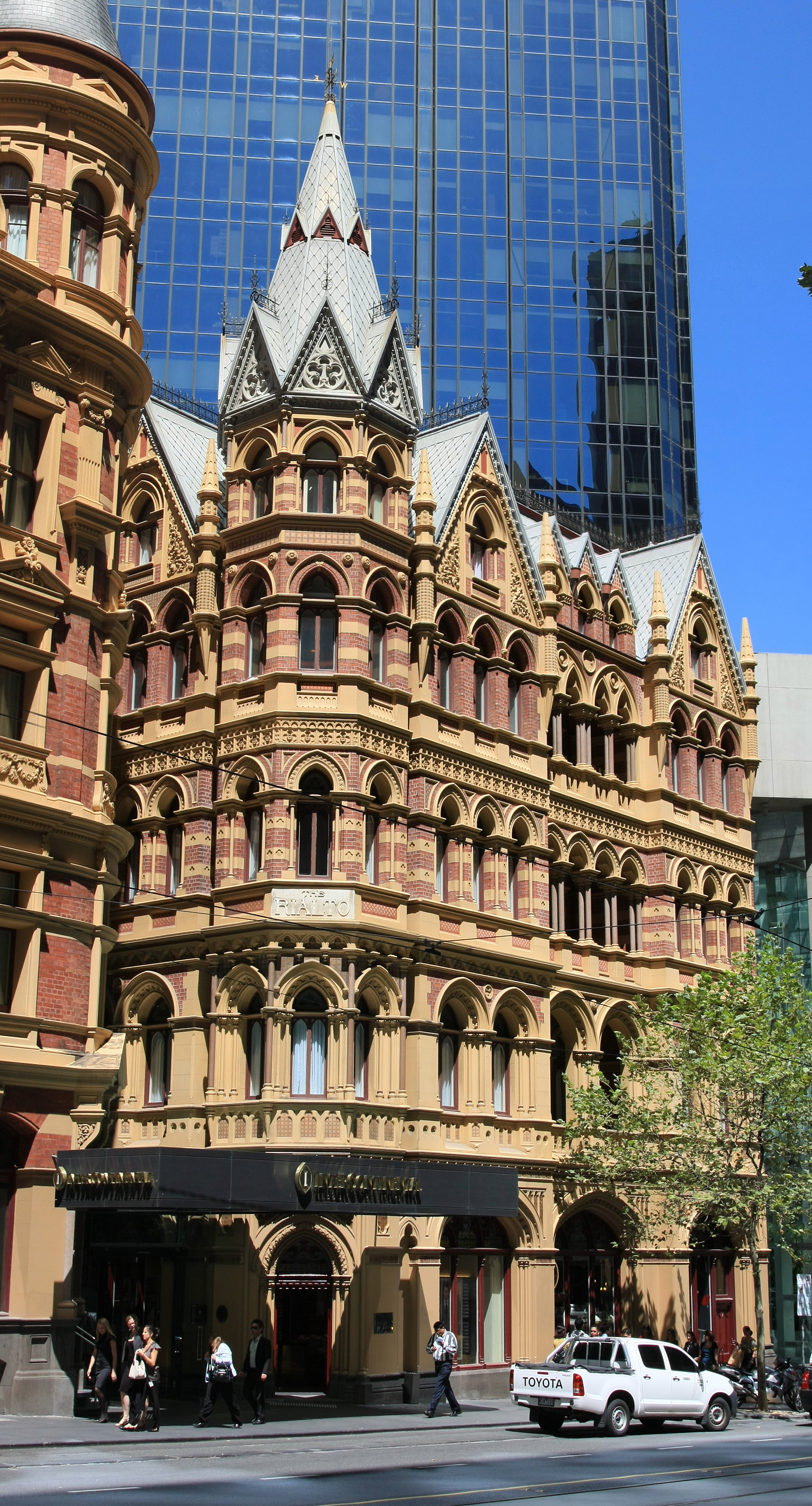
Rialto (2010)

=== Rialto Building, 497–503 Collins Street ===
The Rialto Building was designed by prolific architect William Pitt for businessman Patrick McCaughan, and constructed in 1890–91. The Gothic Revival front is richly articulated, with an array of Gothic pointed arch windows and loggia screens, tuck pointed brickwork, painted render, insets of coloured tiles, and a lively roofline with corner turret. The front office section is four floors plus attic, with a block-long rear section of rooms used as offices or storerooms, reaching down a further two floors due to the slope behind, which is accessed by open galleries on the east side. It is set back from the west side boundary to allow a bluestone cobbled delivery laneway, running from Flinders Lane at the rear, which then looped under the building, through to an existing lane called Winfield Square, between the Rialto and the Winfield Buildings, allowing easy delivery. It is still visible on the west side, but obscured by new floors on the east. At the Flinders Lane ends of the balconies on each level there are corrugated iron enclosures with arched windows, which originally housed urinals. In the early 1980s the Rialto was retained whole, restored, and combined with a new rear wing behind the adjacent Winfield building as part of their redevelopment into a hotel, originally the Menzies at the Rialto, opening in 1984. In 2024, an office and hotel tower replacing the 1984 rear hotel wing of the Winfield Building that would cantilever over the rear wing of the Rialto was approved.

=== Winfield Building, 487–495 Collins Street ===
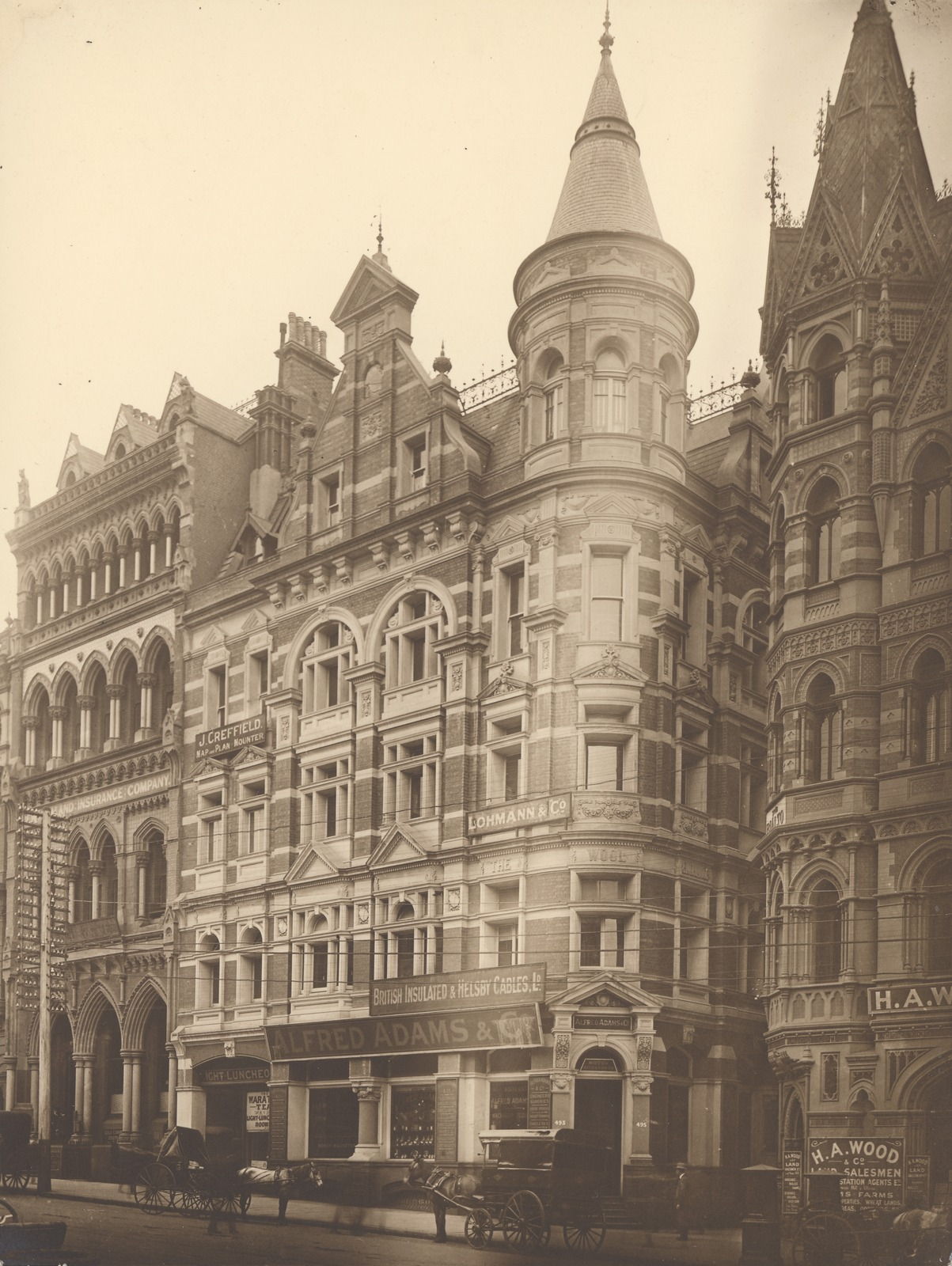
Wool Exchange / Winfield Building c1910s

The Winfield Building, built as the Wool Exchange building in 1891, was designed by Charles D'Ebro and Richard Speight Jnr. It had a front section of offices, and a much larger rear section of stores of various sizes, stretching the full block back to Flinders Lane. The front section is an example of the Queen Anne style, in red brick with detailing in cement render including banding across the facade, double height arches, scrolled and broken pediments, a high gable and a circular corner turret. Built at the same time as the Rialto, the two corner turrets face each other across the gap formed by the laneway between them, originally called Winfield Square. The building was Melbourne's first amalgamated wool exchange and incorporated an auction hall (in the rear section) which brought together all Melbourne wool sales, until they left for a new location in 1914. Other tenants in the rear stores included the Melbourne Chilled Butter Company and Melbourne Cool Storage Co.

From the mid 1920s it became known as the Winfield Building, presumably after the laneway between it and the Rialto. The rear stores were demolished in 1978, and in 1984 a new rear wing was built similar to that of the Rialto as part of their joint redevelopment into an hotel, originally the Menzies at the Rialto.

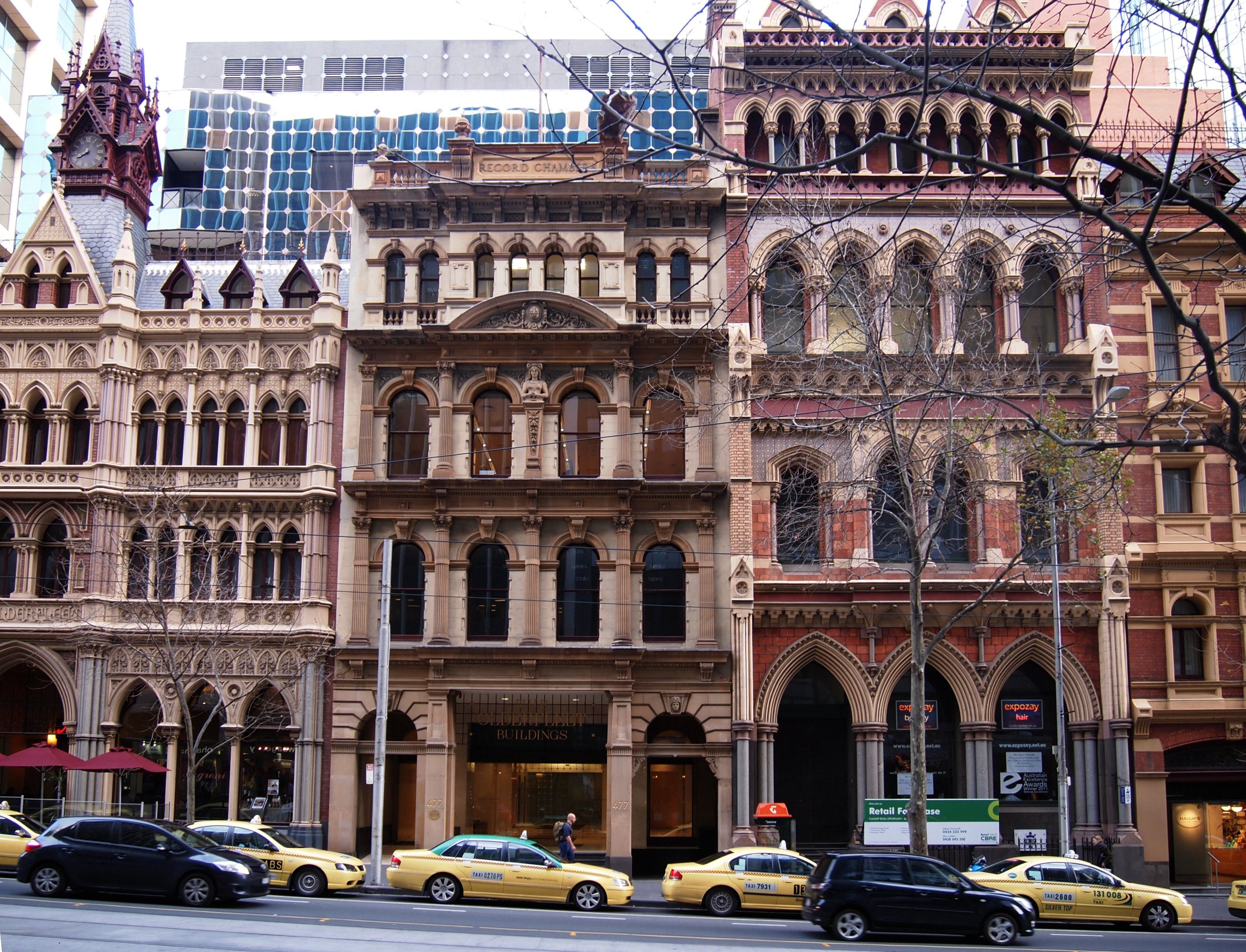
Record Chambers, and New Zealand Chambers / South Australian Insurance (2012)

=== New Zealand Chambers, 483–485 Collins Street ===
The New Zealand Chambers was built in 1887 by C Butler to a design by architects Terry & Oakden (later Oakden, Addison & Kemp), for the New Zealand Insurance Company, at a cost of approximately £20,000. The New Zealand Insurance Company was founded in Auckland in 1859 and by 1888 had many branches and agencies around the world. The Gothic Revival facade employs pointed arched openings on all levels, with deep set windows, a loggia on the top floor, and dormer windows above. It is richly coloured, with columns in red and grey granite, and detailing in red and buff terracotta, with spandrels in patterned encaustic tiles. The building was later known as the South Australian Insurance Building. In 1984, the front 10 or so metres was retained, combined with the front portions of the adjacent Record Chambers and Olderfleet, with a new office building built behind, known collectively as The Olderfleet. That office building was in turn replaced in 2019–21 by a much taller office building, set behind that the same front portions of the historic buildings.

=== Record Chambers, 479–481 Collins Street ===
The Record Chambers was designed by J A B Koch and built by G B Leith in 1887 for the printing and publishing firm of McCarron, Bird & Co. It as named after the Australasian Insurance and Banking Record, aka "The Record", pre-eminent amongst insurance and banking journals in Australia. Other publications by the company included Alexander Sutherland's Victoria and Its Metropolis (1888), and numerous journals, including Australasian Trade Review, Manufacturer's Journal, Australian Brewers' Journal, and Temperance News. Unlike the other buildings in the group, Record Chambers is not Gothic but an expression of late 19th-century eclectic classicism. It has features drawn from the Renaissance, French Renaissance and Baroque, with fluted engaged columns and pilasters, a caryatid terminus (half-female figure on a pedestal) and a segmental pediment above. When this and the adjacent buildings either side were redeveloped as the frontage of an office building behind in the 1980s, known as the Olderfleet, the entrance was located in this building, by removing what had been a shopfront. That office building was replaced in 2019–21 by a much taller office building, also set behind the retained front portions of the historic buildings.

=== Olderfleet Building, 471–477 Collins Street ===
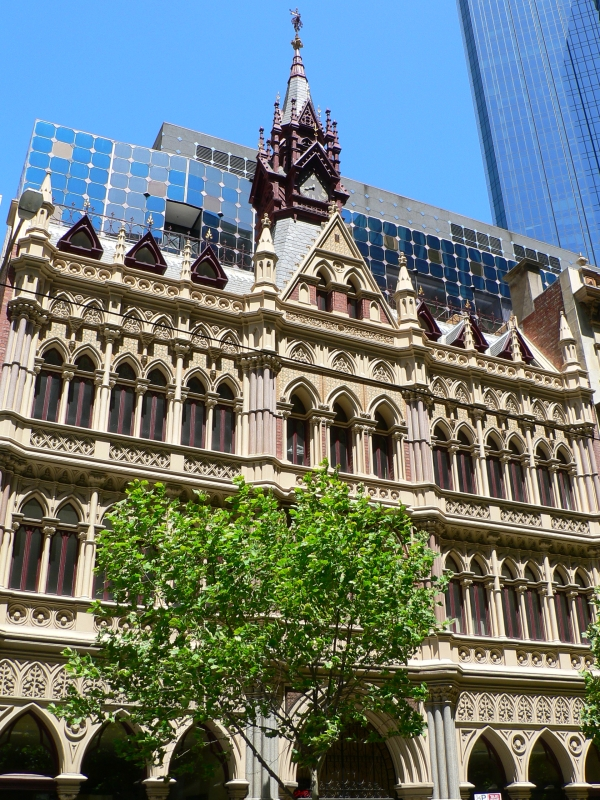
Olderfleet (2006)

The Olderfleet Building was built in 1889–90 for businessman P K McCaughan, by builder G Wadley. The architect was William Pitt, who designed the Rialto building four doors down, also for McCaughan, the next year. It was designed in a flamboyant Gothic Revival style described as Venetian, and has similarities to medieval Flemish cloth halls. The majority of construction is red brick, with cement dressings, with patterned tiles and granite piers, tall windows with pointed arches, and is topped by an elaborate central fleche functioning as a clock tower. The original complex included a large warehouse section that, like the Rialto and the Winfield, stretched back to Flinders Lane, accessed by a bluestone laneway which, like the Rialto, ran up one side of the lot, under one end of the rear section, and out along the other side. In the 1890s, tenants in the Olderfleet Building included the Melbourne Woolbrokers Association, and others associated with agricultural industries. The rear section was demolished in 1974. In 1984, the remaining front portion was combined with the front portions of the adjacent Record Chambers and New Zealand Chambers, with a new office building built behind, known collectively as The Olderfleet. That office building was in turn replaced in 2019–21 by a much taller office building, set behind the same front portions of the historic buildings.
