= Federal Coffee Palace =

Hotel building in Melbourne, Australia

Federal Hotel and Coffee Palace
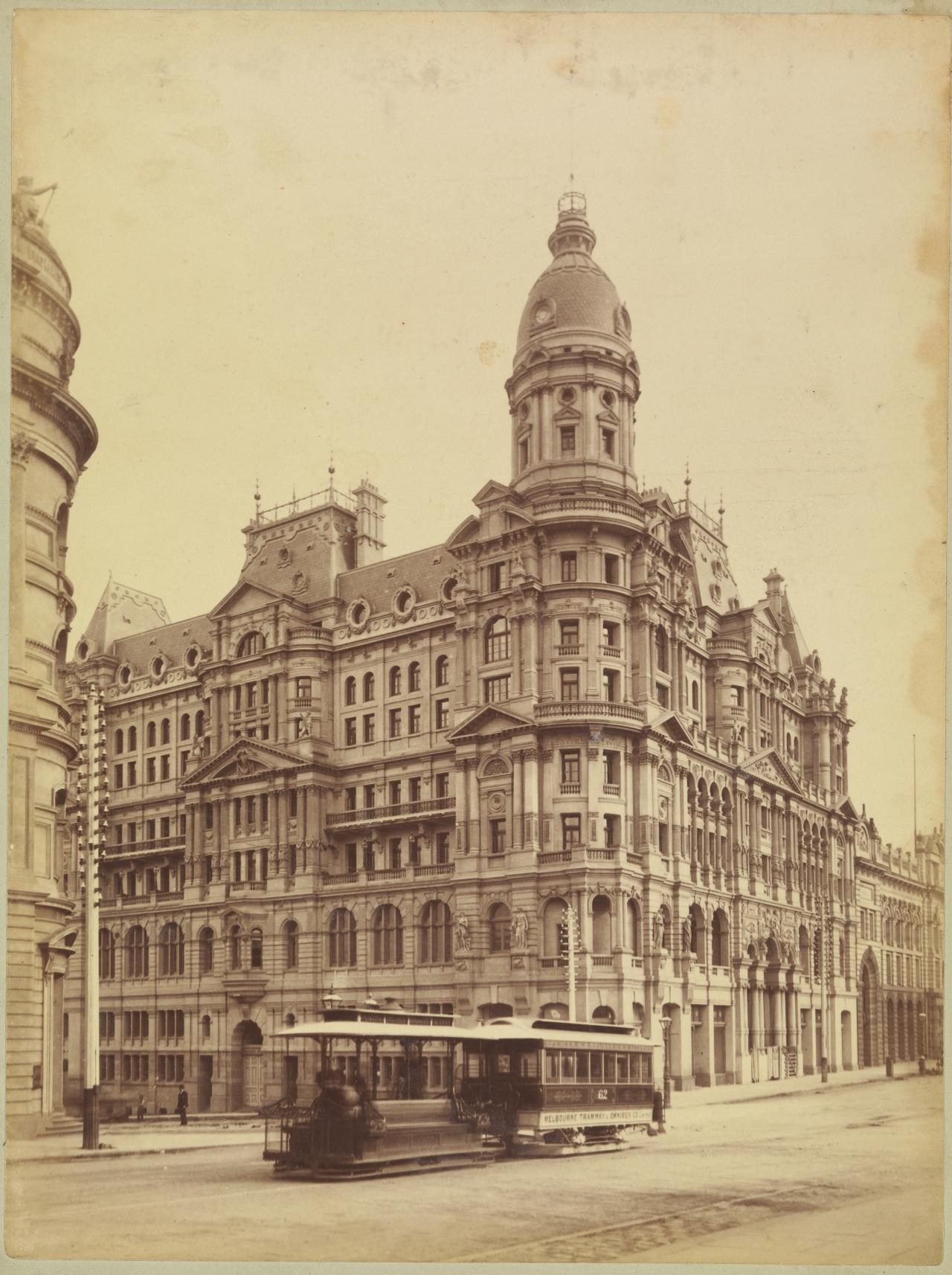
- The Federal Coffee Palace, 1890s

General information
- Location: 555 Collins Street, Melbourne, Victoria, Australia
- Coordinates: 37.8183°S 144.9567°E
- Opening: 27 July 1888
- Demolished: 1973
- Cost: £150,000
- Owner: Federal Coffee Palace Company
- Operator: Federal Coffee Palace Company

Height
- Height: 165 ft (50 m)

Technical details
- Floor count: 9

Design and construction
- Architects: Ellerker & Kilburn in partnership with William Pitt
- Developer: Federal Coffee Palace Company

Other information
- Number of rooms: 560
- Number of suites: 370

The Federal Coffee Palace was a large, elaborate French Second Empire-style 560-room temperance hotel in the city centre of Melbourne, built between 1886 and 1888 at the height of the city's land boom, and demolished c. 1972–73. Located on the corner of Collins and King streets, near Spencer Street station (the address is now 555 Collins Street), it is prominent in lists of the buildings Melburnians most regret having lost.

The Federal Coffee Palace was by far the largest and grandest product of the late 19th century temperance movement in the Southern Hemisphere. The Age wrote that the £150,000 hotel was one of "Australia's most splendid" buildings; in fact, it was "one of the largest and most opulent hotels in the world".

With seven main floors and two more in the corner tower, it was the most massive of the rash of large tall buildings built in the central city in the 1880s boom. The height to the top of the corner dome was 165 ft (50 m), its height to roof of 48m exceeded the 43m Fink's Building completed the previous year making it briefly Melbourne and Australia's tallest building until completion of the Australian Building in mid 1890, which measured 53m to the top of its corner spire.

== History ==
=== Design and construction ===
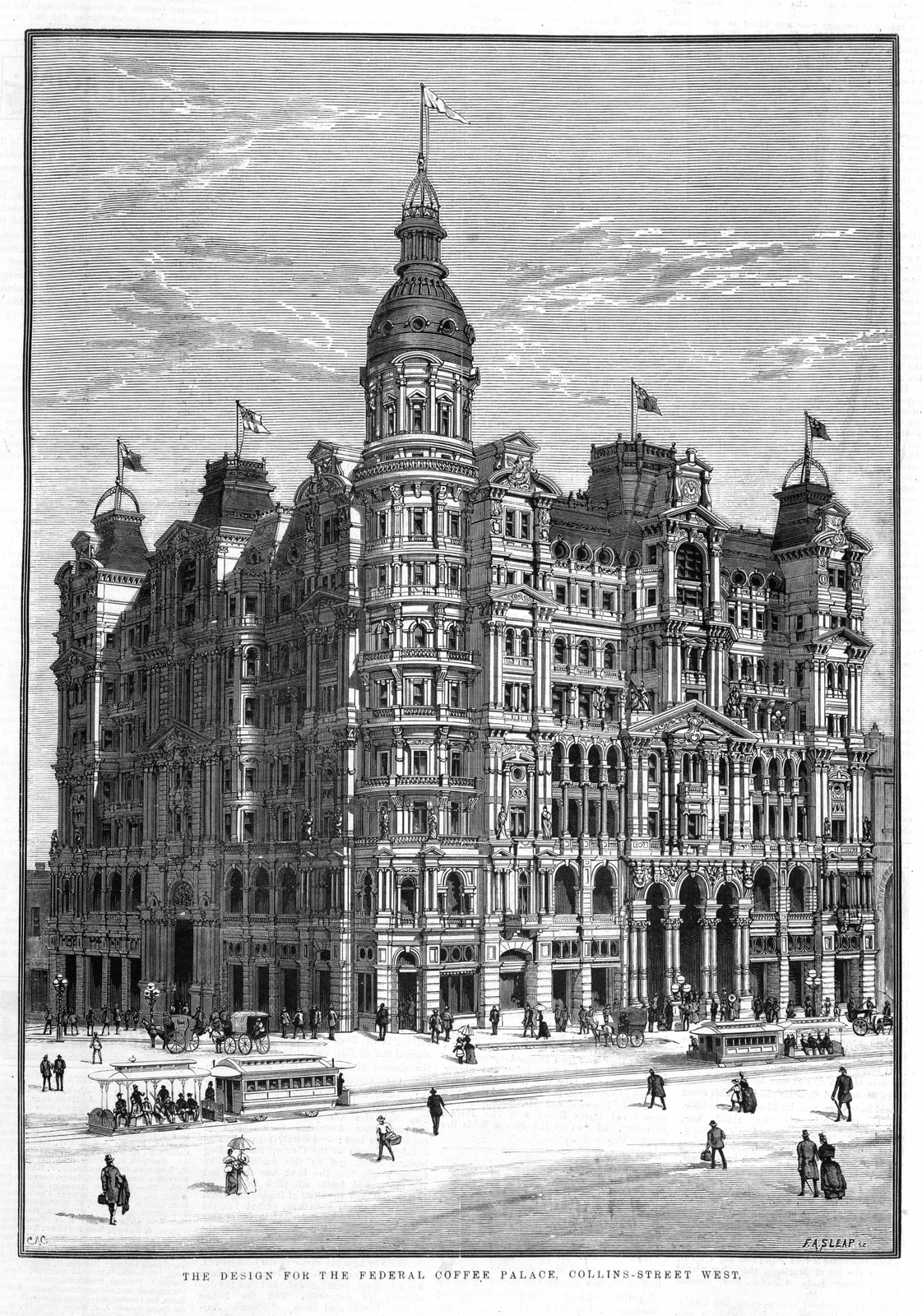
An 1886 illustration by engraver F. A. Sleap showing it with one floor more than actually built.

In June 1885, the local businessmen and politicians James Mirams and James Munro established the Federal Coffee Palace Company, and announced their intention to issue £100,000 of shares to buy the plot on the corner of Collins and King streets, and build a seven-storey temperance hotel to the design of Tappin Gilbert and Dennehy, that would be 'the finest in the city'.

In November 1885, perhaps not satisfied with that design, the Company held a competition, with 13 entries; the first prize was awarded to Ellerker & Kilburn, and the second to William Pitt; and they then worked together to design 'the massive edifice', marrying the exterior of Ellerker & Kilburn with Pitt's grandly planned interior. It was designed in an eclectic style, with an array of Renaissance Revival details and French Second Empire style mansard roofs

The builders were T. Cockram and W. Comely. Construction began in early 1886, and it opened in July 1888, in time for Melbourne's Centennial Exhibition, which opened at the Exhibition Buildings on 1 August.

The building had 560 rooms. It also featured impressively appointed dining and entertaining rooms; the first two floors included billiards, dining, lounging, reading, and smoking rooms. The hotel had 370 guest bedrooms, with a penthouse suite in the tower at the top of the building. The construction took five million bricks and cost £110,000. The building was serviced by a passenger lift, one of Melbourne's earliest which was popular with visitors.

The Age wrote that the £150,000 hotel was one of "Australia's most splendid" buildings; in fact, it was "one of the largest and most opulent hotels in the world".

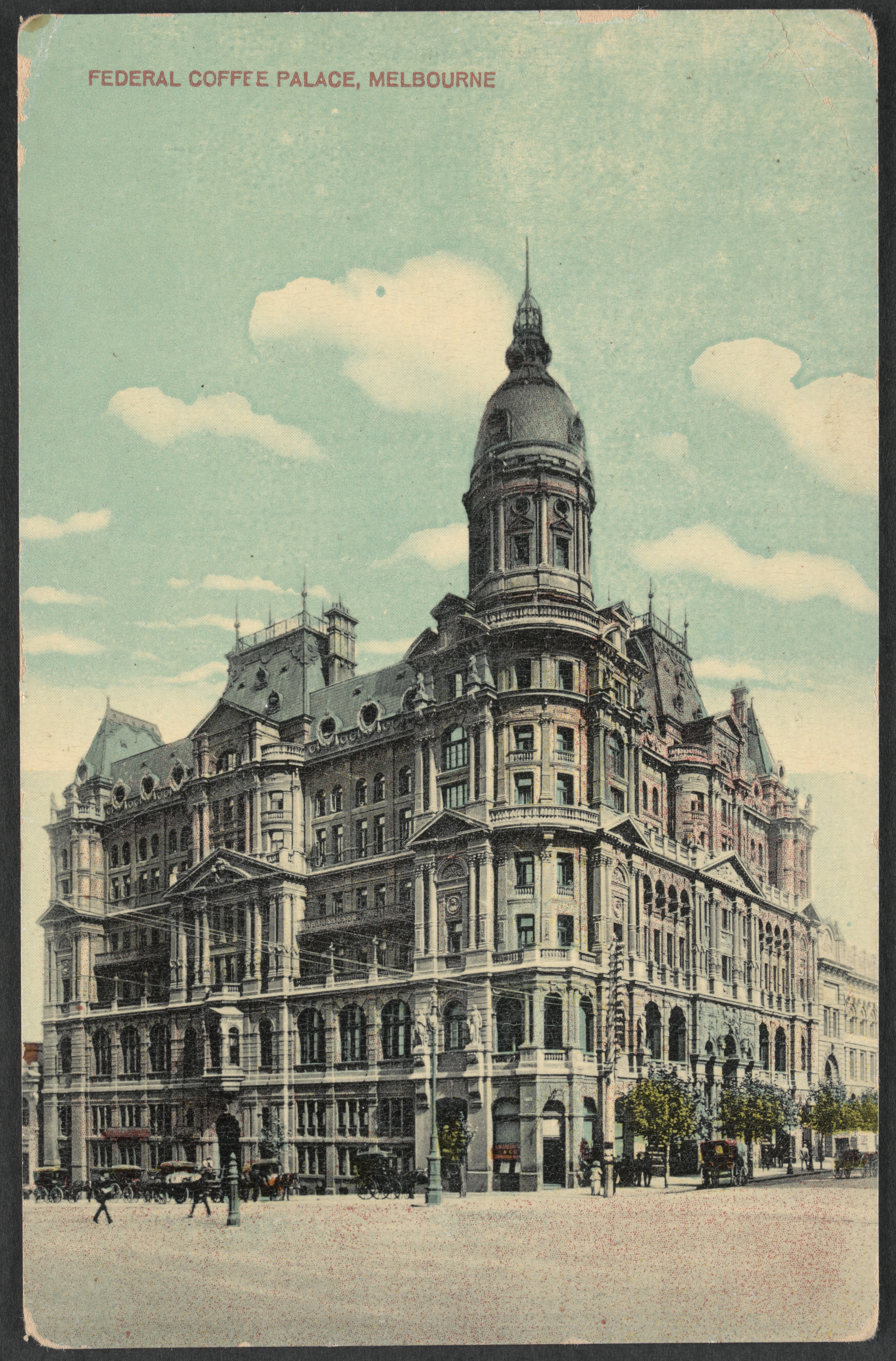
An 1908 postcard of the Federal Hotel

The boom soon turned into the economic crash of the early 1890s, and the Federal struggled to make dividends for its investors. In 1897 the Federal gained a wine license, and changed its name to the Federal Palace Hotel, and in 1923 after years of attempts, it finally became fully licensed.

==== Attempts to modernise and decline in popularity ====
Many of the interiors rooms were modernised in the interwar period including the dining room which was to be insulated with asbestos fibre for soundproofing in 1936.

The Federal was listed in 1948 as one of the key sites for the modernisation of Melbourne. The site, along with the adjoining Australian Estate Company wool store, was purchased for £78,500 and earmarked for replacement with a new modern hotel building. The new hotel construction did not proceed. The owners instead attempted to modernise some of the bars and accommodation.

Some minor modifications had taken place by the 1950s, including the removal of iron cresting and the widow's walks on the mansard roofs, truncation of the chimneys, the enlarging of the top floor circular windows into taller ones, and the insertion of small windows into the main pediments. Most of the building's original gargoyles were also removed, though the statuary remained.

A mezannine was added to some of the function rooms, resulting in the large arched window bays on the lower King Street frontage lower floors being converted into square windows. During this period a large 'Federal' neon sign was added to the Collins Street corner facade in addition to a large lettered 'Hotel Federal' sign on the corner. The entire external facade was painted dark grey with white trims.

In 1962, the International-style Southern Cross Hotel in Bourke Street was completed, and the proliferation of suburban hotels and motels in the 1950s and 60s was eating into of the business from the old grand city hotels such as the Menzies, Federal, Windsor and Scotts. Photos from the Wolfang Sievers Collection show that by 1965 the reception lobby and some reception rooms had been completely or partly modernised, along with most of the accommodation rooms, in an effort to compete. The huge Victorian era vestibule remained intact.

In 1967, the Australian Women's Weekly featured an on socialite Peter Janson, who leased the vacant upper levels and converted them into an expansive apartment in 1967, including a bedroom in the dome of the tower with an attic window, from which the entire city centre could be viewed, and a rooftop courtyard garden.

== Architectural style and features ==
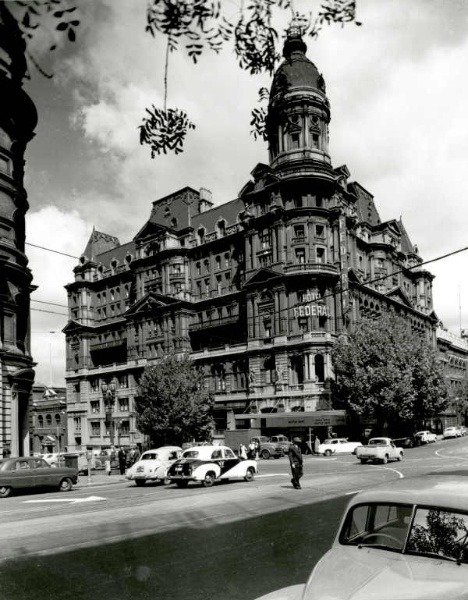
The hotel in the 1950s. Many of the external and internal modifications dated to this period.

The Federal was designed in an eclectic style, with an array of Renaissance Revival details and French Second Empire style mansard roofs Ellerker & Kilburn designed the building with multiple setbacks to relieve its great bulk whilst making an impressive visual statement with the lofty corner dome. The setbacks were punctuated by a mixture of recessed and projected balconies, forming a loggia arcade near the base, and large vertical classical temple-like structures. The external stucco facade combined a staggering array of distinctive decorative features of the period.

The main entrance was paired giant order ionic columns in a large Paladian arrangement. Other external features included extensive use of diocletian windows, festooned round windows, baroque styled broken and nested pediments complete with detailed reliefs, pilasters, balustered balconies, oriel windows, keystones, niches, sculptured statuary, curved walls, cast iron lacework and cresting. The building also featured several gargoyles which were later removed, including lions and gryphons on the upper storeys.

The interiors were equally impressive, often attributed to William Pitt featured a huge sunlit, four storey lobby with vaulted roof and grand staircase, and a main hall reached via a long arcade loggia of 14 Ionic columns. The elaborately detailed interior atrium featured giant order composite columns culminating in a Palladian architecture styled arch flanked by vault archway openings.

== Early skyscraper ==
Skyscrapers by contemporary definition are 10 storeys tall and exceed 50 metres. The hotel at 9 storeys narrowly misses the criteria for floors, but qualified for height when the tower is included, with an overall height of 50 metres (160 ft). The main structure was 7 storeys tall with a height of 47 metres (154 ft) when measured to roof. The additional 2 storey habitable tower briefly made it Australia's tallest building, exceeding Fink's Building (43 m) in 1888, until the completion of the Australian Building (53 m) in mid 1890.

Despite the lack of a steel frame, and partly due to tall ceilings, its height to roof was among the highest in the world for a habitable building in 1888. Contemporary skyscrapers in New York and Chicago were not much taller. The Federal was just five metres short of New York's tallest hotel, the 1884 Hotel Chelsea. It was just a few metres shorter than some of North America's tallest office buildings, just one metre less than the 1887 Wilder Building, five metres less than the Rookery Building completed the same year and nine metres shorter than the 1886 Potter Building, considered among the earliest steel framed skyscrapers.

It would have been dwarfed by very few, including the tallest towers in the world, the 1875 New York Tribune Building and 1885 Chicago Board of Trade Building (but would have almost reached its roof), as well as the 12-storey Washington Building of 1887, which was 67 metres (220 ft) to the roof.

== Notable guests ==
Its guests included Alexander Graham Bell, Herbert Hoover and Mark Twain.

== Demolition and Legacy ==
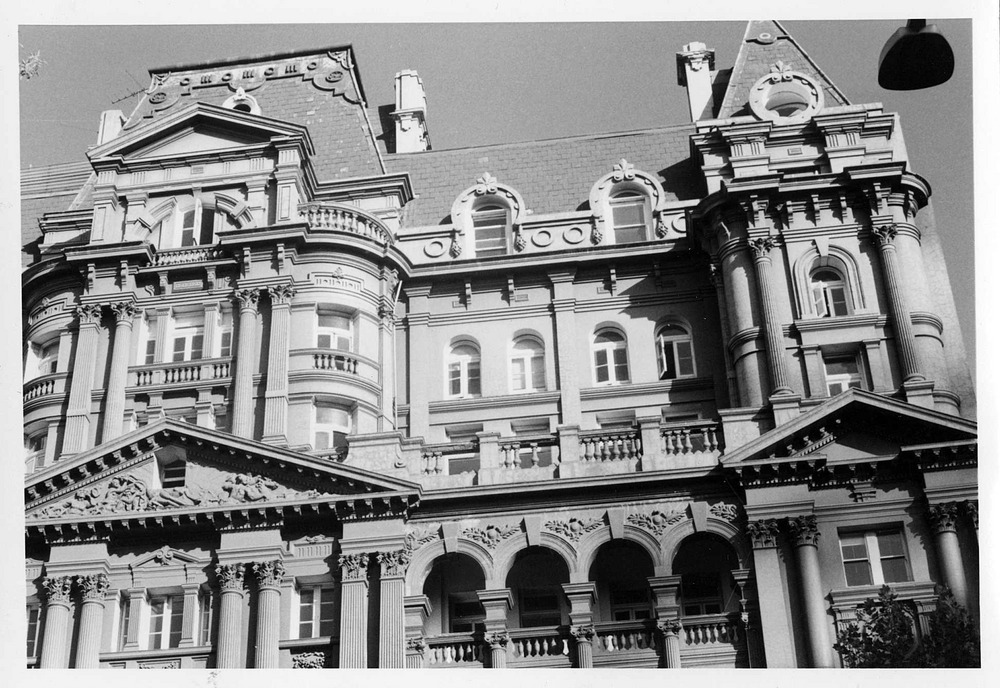
Facade detail prior to demolition, still largely intact.

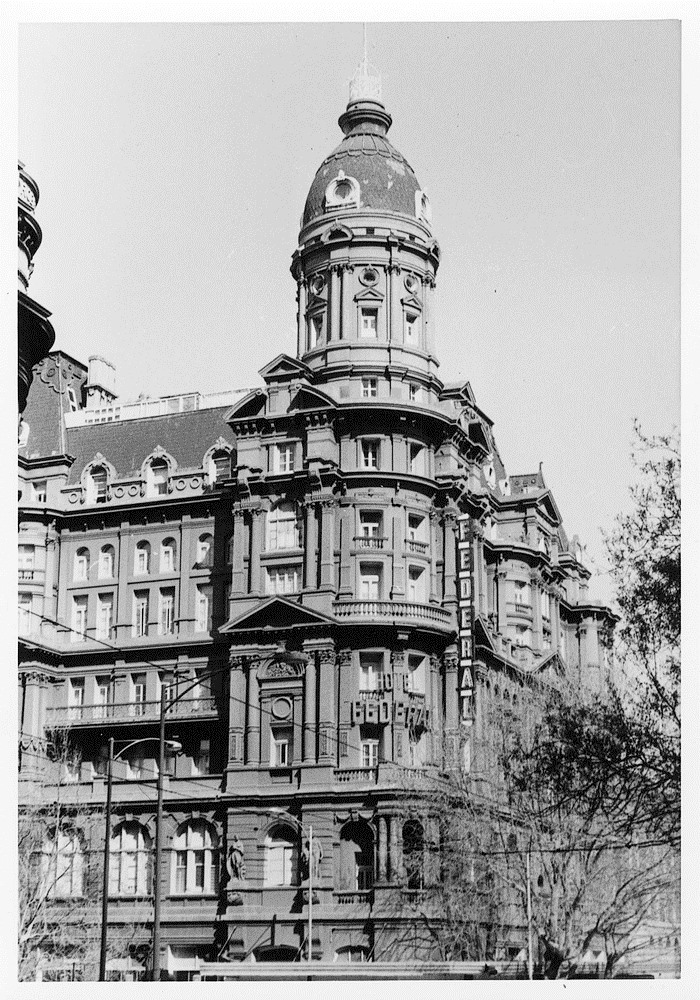
A street view prior to demolition.

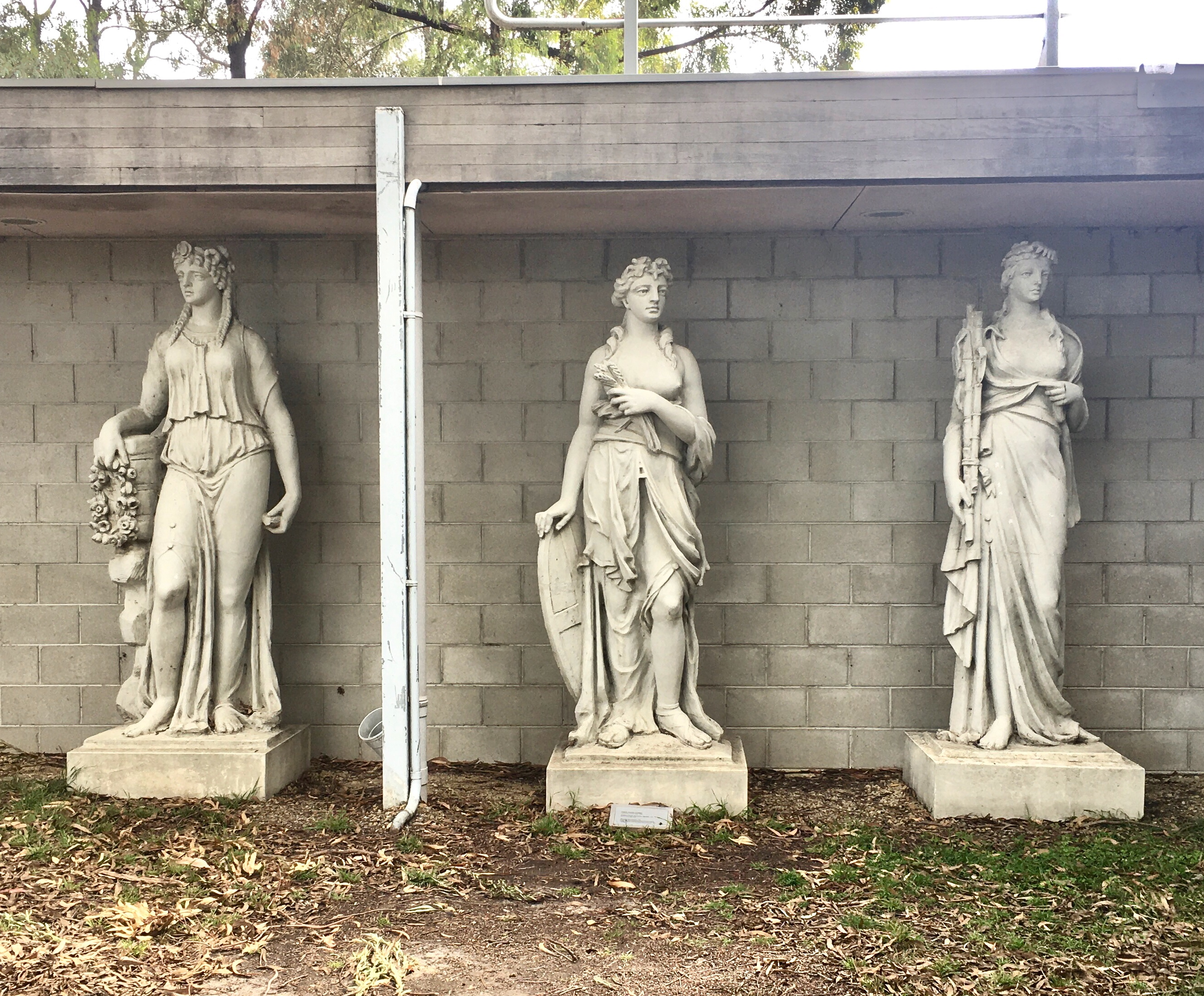
Statuary salvaged from the building on display at McClelland Sculpture Park and Gallery

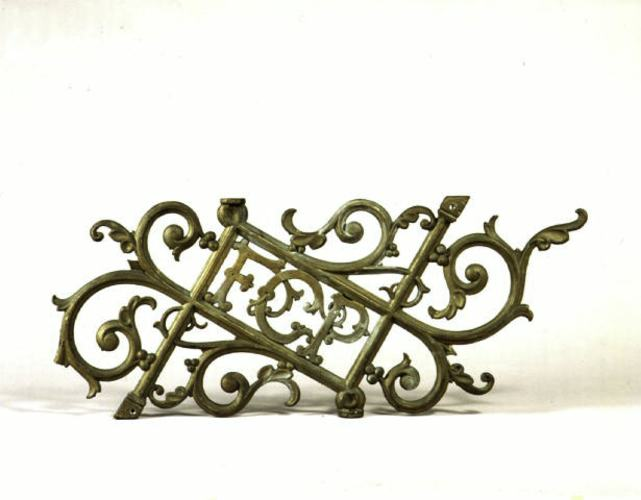
A cast-iron stair balustrade (with 'FCP' in the pattern) salvaged during demolition is on display at the Melbourne Museum

Federal Hotels P/L, seeking funds to develop Hobart's Wrest Point Casino sold it to developers Artagen Property Group (a subsidiary of a London based company) in 1971 for $3.7 million. Closure and demolition for a $12 million 23 storey office development was announced, commencing March 1972 and completed in 1973.

Unlike many other historic buildings in the city the National Trust did not list the Federal and chose not to oppose the demolition, at the time it was concerned mainly with preserving of earlier colonial era buildings and houses, though in 1971 it had listed the nearby much smaller 1890 Olderfleet in response to its acquisition by developers, one of few similar type of buildings to be Trust listed. No green ban was attempted.

Lack of interest for preservation of the Federal can be explained in part by its failure to compete as hotel accommodation despite attempts at modernisation and the stark contrast of the patchwork interiors between the modern and remaining Victorian features. According to historian Robyn Annear elaborate Victorian buildings were "really on the nose" and the Federal's creaky floorboards and lack of ensuites were an "extreme embarrassment" in a city desperate for progress in the late 1960s and early 1970s.

However, it was mostly due to its prominent association with the speculative land boom. Elaborate buildings including the Federal were painted in a negative light at the time, as they were constructed speculatively with excessively large amounts of borrowed funds, many of which were never paid back. In particular, the association with James Munro carried with it strong links to the city's total economic collapse and corruption prior to the Australian banking crisis of 1893. Michael Cannon's influential 1966 book 'Land Boomers' was frequently cited as justifications to rid Melbourne of the embarrassment of the land boom era. His book had whole chapters dedicated to the speculative financial backing behind the Federal Coffee Palace.

In response to public regret of the demolition of the Federal and other significant buildings at the time including the Menzies, the Historic buildings act 1974 and Historic Buildings Preservation Council were introduced. Justifications cited for not saving the Federal were used to support the preservation of the Windsor just years later. The Windsor's preservation benefiting from its proximity to Parliament and the new laws introduced following the demolition of the Menzies, Federal and others, which saw the Windsor become the last surviving luxury hotel of the Victorian era.

Some elements of the building were carefully removed by Whelan the Wrecker; three of the four female statues by modeller Charles William Scurry were relocated to the then new Chateau Commodore in Lonsdale Street, and when that changed hands over 20 years later, they were donated to the McClelland Sculpture Park and Gallery in Langwarrin outside Frankston, Victoria in 1996, and a panel of the cast-iron stair balustrade (with 'FCP' in the pattern) was donated by Myles Whelan to the Museum of Victoria in 1992.

In 1975, the Federal's replacement, the 23 storey Enterprise House was completed.

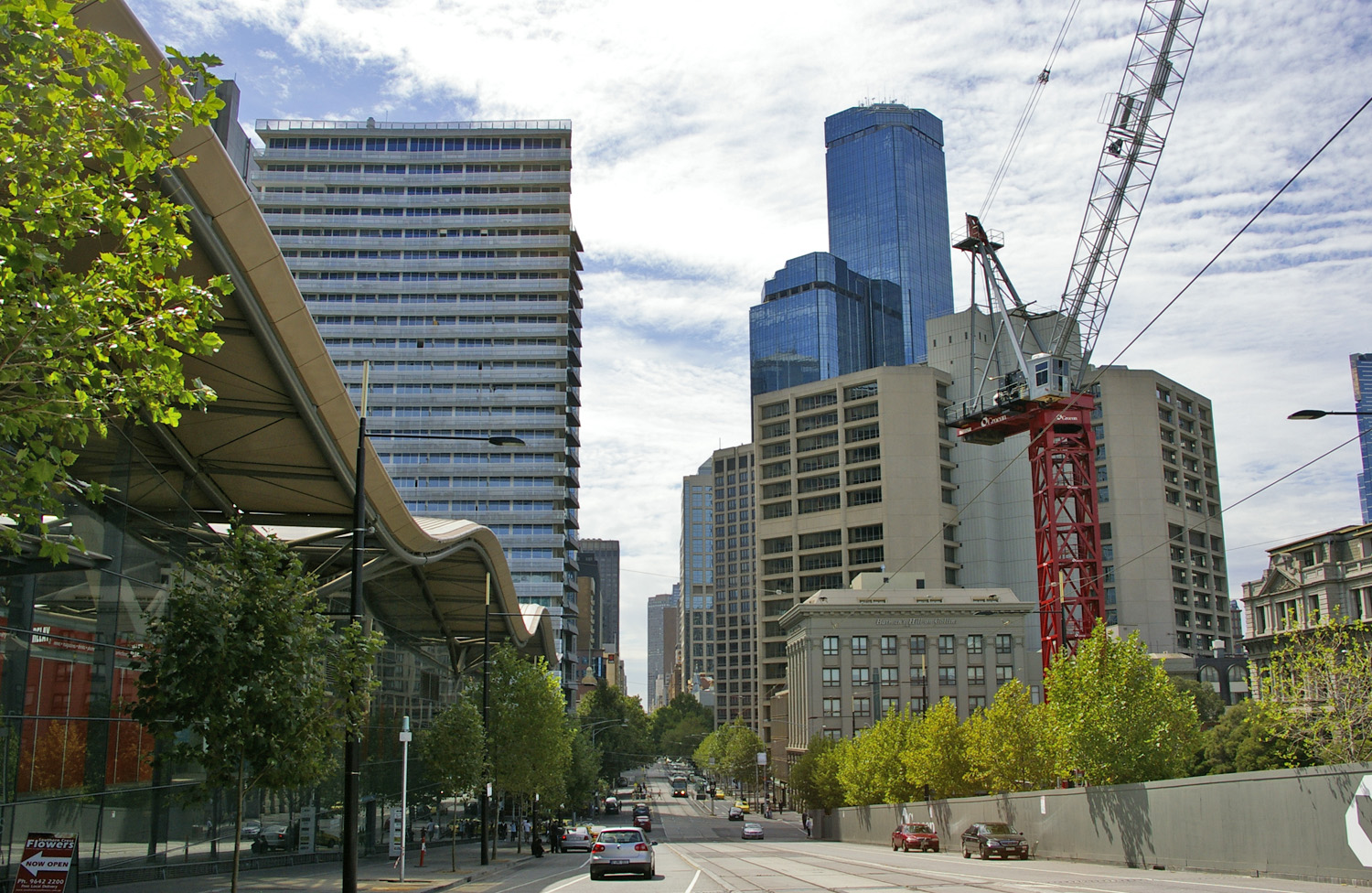
Enterprise House, the 1975 brutalist building on the right, just in front and left of the much taller Rialto Towers as seen in 2008. Like the Rialto, it was built offset to the street at 45 degrees. It was demolished in 2020-2021.

In 2017, approval to replace Enterprise House with a 46 level hotel and apartment tower was granted. In 2019, the design changed to a 35 level office building with retail at ground level.

== See also ==
- Architecture of Melbourne
- Coffee palace
- List of demolished buildings and structures in Melbourne
