= Victorian Heritage Register =

Heritage register of places in Victoria, Australia

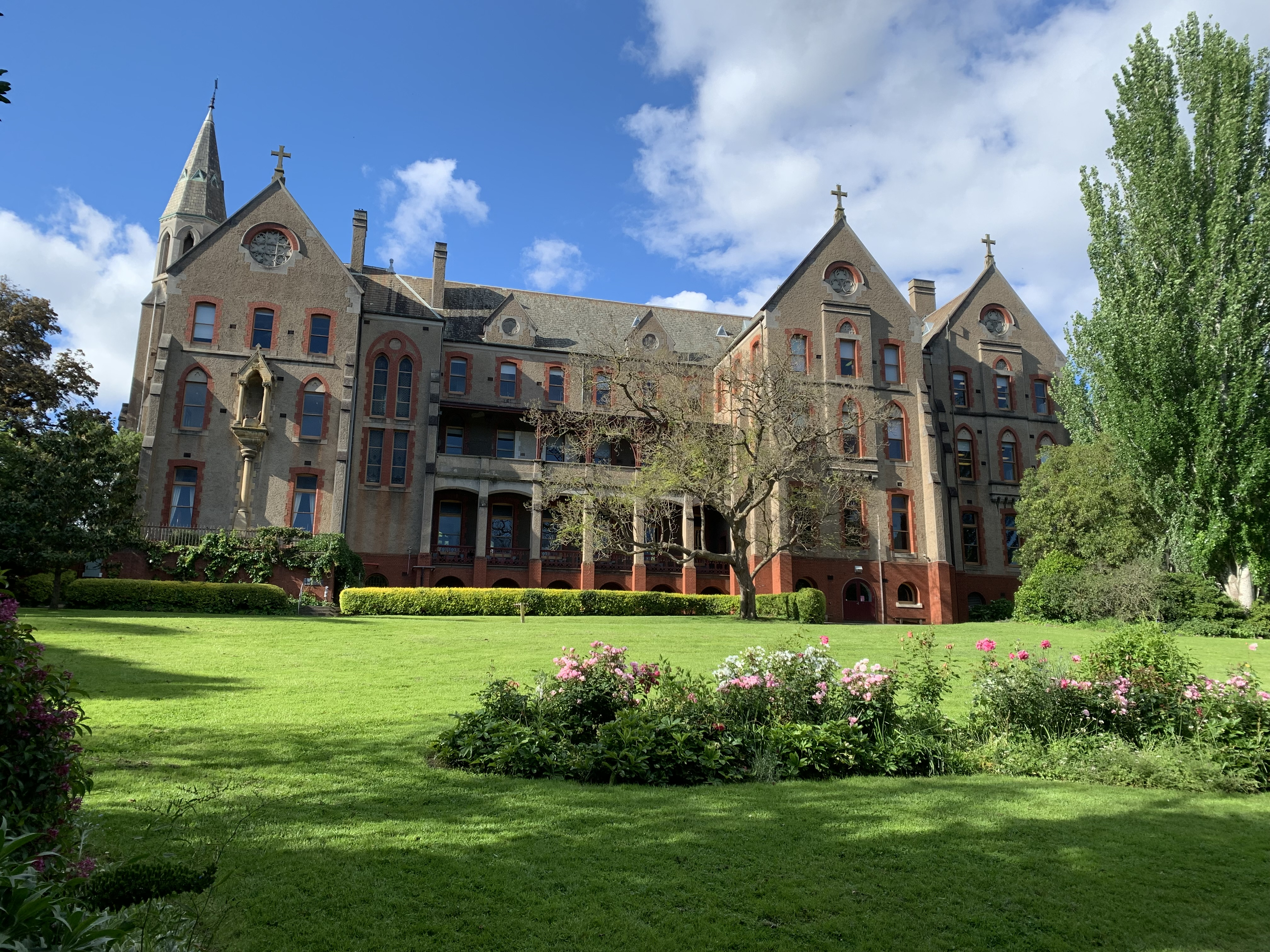
- Abbotsford Convent, a Roman Catholic convent complex on the Victorian Heritage Register
- Type: Natural and cultural heritage register
- State: Victoria, Australia
- Status: Active
- Years: 5 December 1995 – present
- Legislation: Heritage Act 2017
- Compiled by: Heritage Victoria and the Heritage Council of Victoria

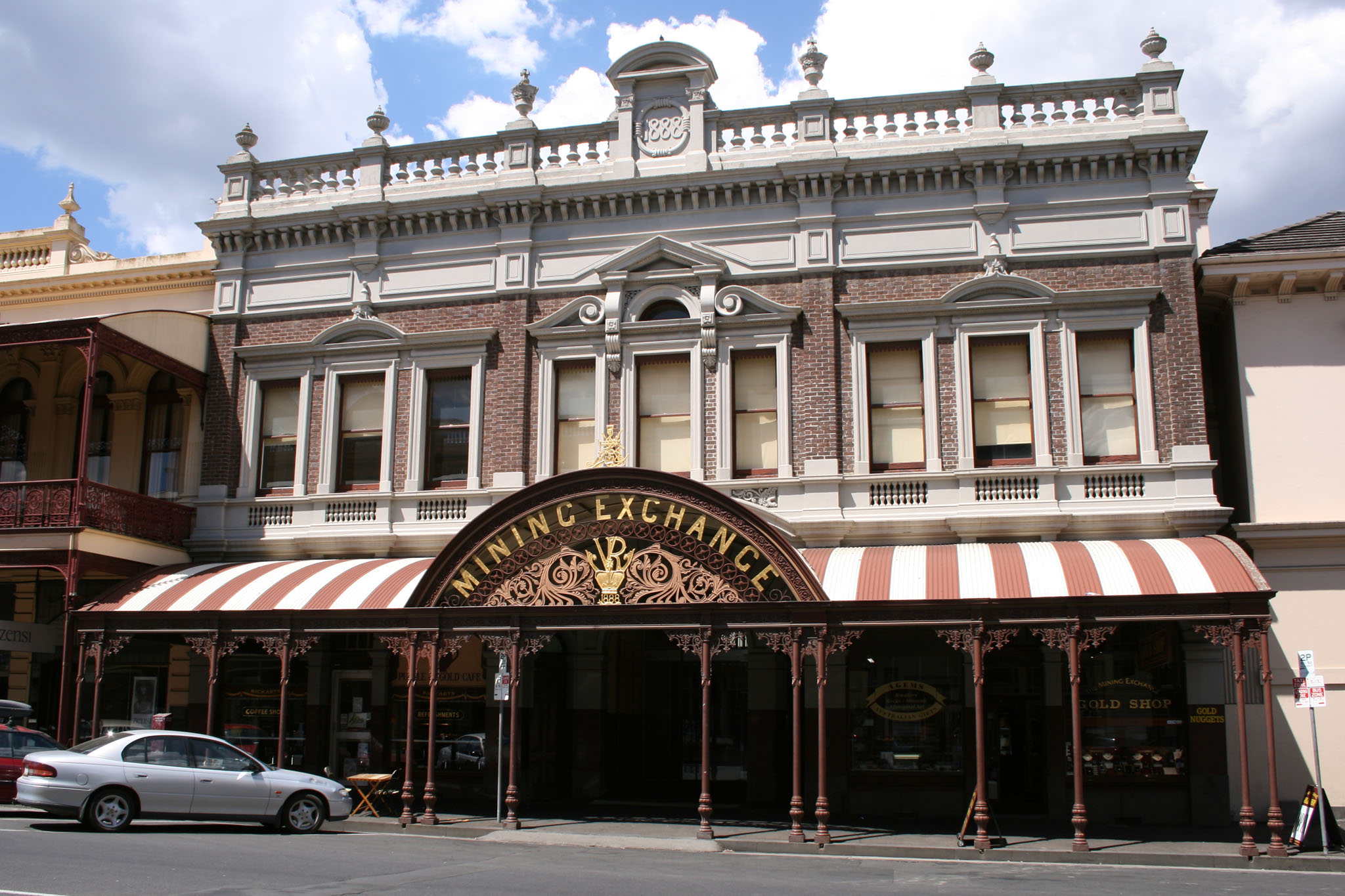
The Mining Exchange at Ballarat, Victoria, a building on the Victorian Heritage Register.

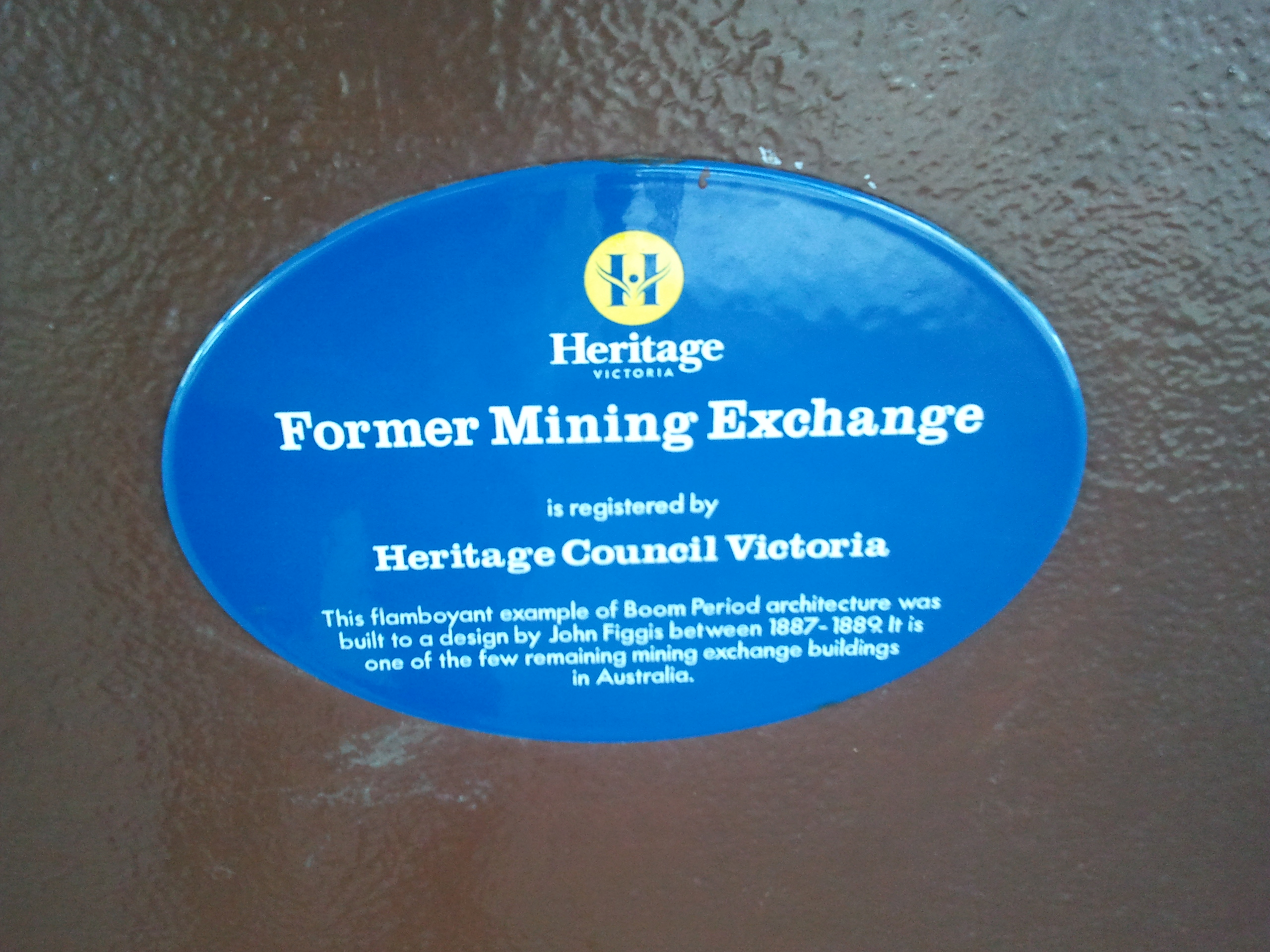
Heritage Victoria blue plaque on the Ballarat Mining Exchange

The Victorian Heritage Register (VHR) lists places deemed to be of cultural heritage significance to the State of Victoria, Australia. It has statutory weight under the Heritage Act 2017. The Minister for Planning is the responsible minister. Heritage Victoria was established as the state government listing and permit authority in 1995, replacing the original authority, the Historic Buildings Preservation Council, established in 1974. Listing on the Victorian Heritage Register is separate from listing by a local Council or Shire, known as a Heritage Overlay. Heritage Victoria is currently part of the Department of Environment, Land, Water and Planning of the Government of Victoria, Australia. Heritage Victoria reports to the Heritage Council who approve recommendations to the Register and hear appeals when a registration is disputed. The council also hears appeals by an owner to a permit issued by Heritage Victoria (third parties cannot appeal). As of 2021, there are over 2,400 places and objects listed on the VHR.

== Types of places ==
The Heritage Act 2017 allows the registration of a wide range of cultural heritage places and objects, including:

- historic archaeological sites and artefacts
- historic buildings, structures and precincts
- gardens, trees and cemeteries
- cultural landscapes
- shipwrecks and relics
- significant objects and collections

Places included in the Victorian Heritage Register can be found on the Victorian Heritage Database, which also lists many places with a local level of protection.

Inclusion in the Victorian Heritage Register does not mean a place cannot be demolished or altered; instead a permit from Heritage Victoria is required, which may or may not be granted, or granted with conditions. "Delisting" a place occurs only if the place has been destroyed (for instance by fire), or a permit has been granted for total demolition or alterations so extensive the place no longer has State level significance. The planning minister may intervene in the process of listing or the granting of a permit, by not accepting the advice of Heritage Victoria or the Heritage Council, preventing a place from being listed, or allowing greater alteration or even total demolition.

All places and objects included in the register are entitled to a blue plaque.

== See also ==
- Heritage listed buildings in Melbourne
- Category:Victorian Heritage Register
- List of heritage registers
