= Heritage Victoria =

Branch of government of Victoria, Australia

Agency overview
- Formed: 1996; 30 years ago
- Type: Statutory authority
- Jurisdiction: Victoria, Australia
- Minister responsible: Sonya Kilkenny, Minister for Planning
- Agency executive: Steven Avery, Executive Director
- Parent department: Department of Transport and Planning
- Key documents: Heritage Act, 2017 (VIC); Heritage Amendment Act, 2023 (VIC); Underwater Cultural Heritage Act, 2018 (VIC)
- Website: heritage.vic.gov.au

Heritage Victoria is a statutory authority of the Department of Transport and Planning, part of the Victorian government that has jurisdiction in Victoria, Australia. It is the regulator responsible for administering the Heritage Act, 2017 (VIC), the Underwater Cultural Heritage Act, 2018 (VIC), and subsequent amendments to both acts.

The Heritage Act provides for the protection and conservation of the cultural heritage of Victoria and established the Victorian Heritage Register and Victorian Heritage Inventory. The register is a statutory list of places and objects which are of significance to the State of Victoria. The inventory is a non-statutory list of known historical archaeological sites. Both lists can be searched via the Victorian Heritage Database.

As of October 2026, Heritage Victoria managed 2,368 significant heritage places; 6,986 historical archaeological sites; 153 conservation projects that were valued at over A$55 million; and 676 underwater sites including shipwrecks, aircraft wrecks and submarines.

== Functions ==
Heritage Victoria is responsible for the most important historic heritage sites in Victoria. This includes state significant heritage places, historical archaeological sites, and shipwrecks. Heritage Victoria's role includes:

- recommending to the Heritage Council of Victoria about what to include in the Victorian Heritage Register
- deciding about changes to places in the Victorian Heritage Register
- adding details of historical archaeological sites to the Victorian Heritage Inventory
- deciding about changes to historical archaeological sites
- deciding who can access shipwrecks
- regulating and enforcing the Heritage Act

== History ==
=== Protection of heritage buildings ===
Statutory protection of Victoria's historic buildings commenced in 1974 with the passing of the Historic Buildings Act 1974 (Vic). This was the first law in Australia to recognise and protect privately owned heritage buildings.

The Historic Buildings Act established the Historic Buildings Preservation Council as a statutory authority to administer the Act. In 1974 the Historic Buildings Register commenced when 370 buildings were gazetted, most of which were recommended by the Victorian branch of the National Trust. All were in private ownership or owned by local government authorities.

The Government Buildings Register was established in 1982 under the Government Buildings Advisory Council Act 1972 (Vic). This was a register of approximately 472 historic State government buildings. In 1995, with the commencement of the Heritage Act 1995, the Historic Buildings Register and the Government Buildings Register were migrated into the Victorian Heritage Register, and the former registers were dissolved.

=== Protection of historic archaeological sites ===
Historical archaeology has been protected in Victoria since 1972, when the Archaeological and Aboriginal Relics Preservation Act 1972 commenced. The Victoria Archaeological Survey administered the Act until the early 1990s. The Heritage Act 1995 saw the responsibility for historical archaeology transferred to Heritage Victoria.

== Plaques ==
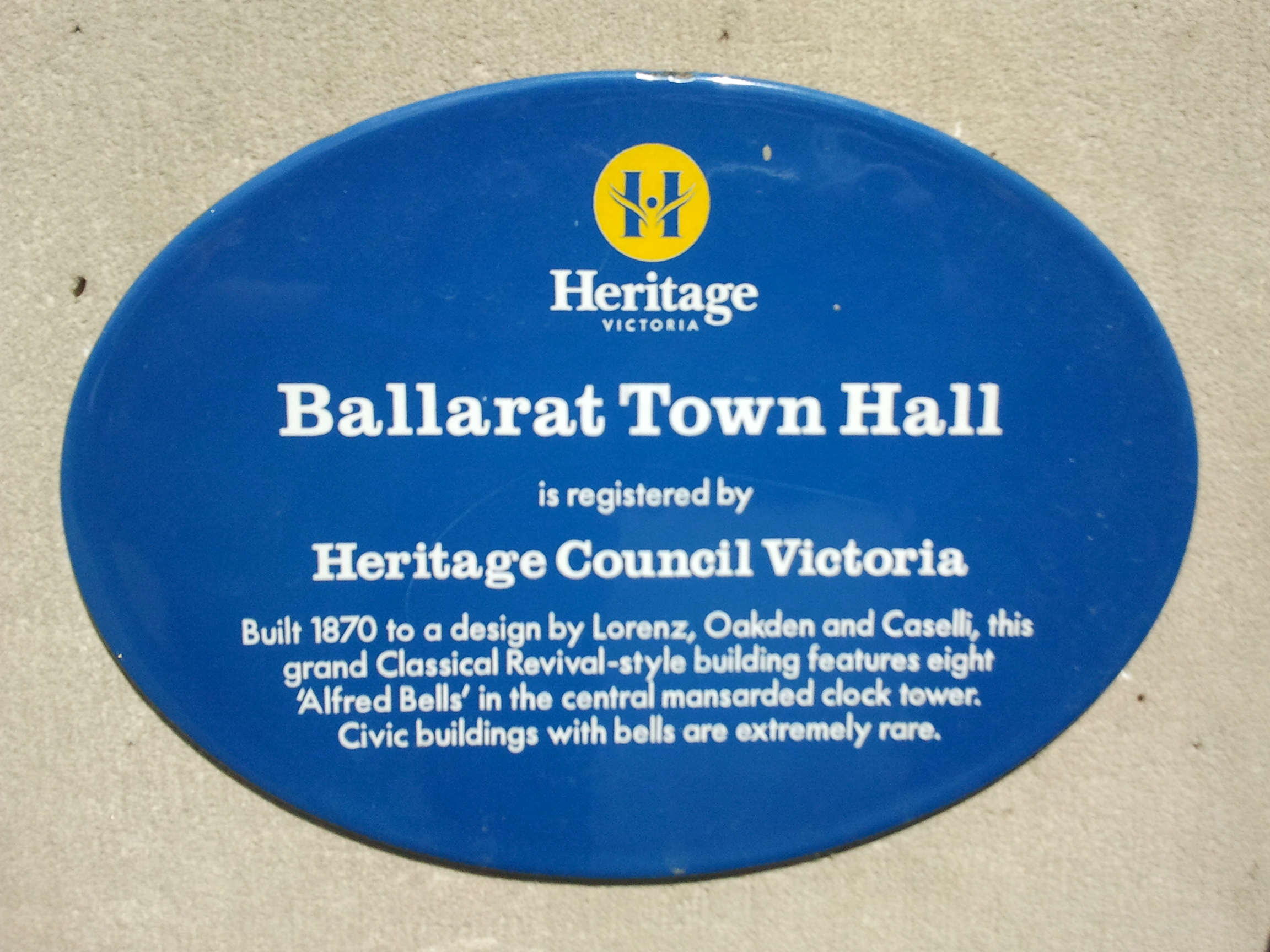
A Heritage Victoria blue plaque on the town hall in Ballarat

Heritage Victoria marks some places on the Victorian Heritage Register with a blue plaque.

== Controversy ==
Heritage Victoria was criticised for excessive restrictions on what private owners can do with registered places. While it has directly saved many buildings of heritage significance from demolition, it has also been criticised for failing to properly protect Victoria's heritage. Several noteworthy buildings have been denied nominations to the Victorian Heritage Register and subsequently been demolished. Other listed buildings have been questioned for their heritage significance.

Though it claims that it would do so only under "exceptional circumstances" it was also criticised for approving demolition of buildings that it had listed including:

Heritage site name	Photo	Location	Year demolished	Comments	Notes
Australian Building		Melbourne CBD	1980	Australia's former tallest building and one of Melbourne's earliest remaining skyscrapers	
Robbs Building		Melbourne CBD	1982	One of Melbourne's finest Renaissance Revival office buildings; approved construction of a (since demolished) podium for the Rialto Towers despite strong community opposition	
No 2 Goods Shed		Melbourne Docklands	2008	Partial demolition, which resulted in what was once Australia's longest building being cut in half	
Windsor Hotel		Melbourne CBD	2010	Partial demolition; last of the major historic 19th century hotels in Australia still operating for a hi-rise tower (though the development did not proceed)	
Princess Mary Club		Melbourne CBD	2015	Complete demolition; Melbourne's most significant hostel for young women, for a new office tower	
Morwell Power Station		Latrobe Valley	2018	Complete demolition of the centrepiece of the state's postwar strategy to revitalise the Latrobe Valley	
Central Pier		Melbourne Docklands	2022	Complete demolition; the remains of the century-old Victoria Dock, the maritime centrepiece which transformed the city into a large international port	

However it has on numerous occasions demanded urgent repair orders and the reconstruction of illegally demolished buildings. It has also won awards for some of its work, such as the mobile phone App for identifying and learning about heritage places. It also maintains a publicly searchable online database of places, and database of historical objects and archaeological finds.

== See also ==
- Architecture of Melbourne
- List of heritage registers
