= Historic Buildings Preservation Council =

Former agency in Victoria, Australia

The Historic Buildings Preservation Council (HBPC) (1974 to 1989) was established by the Victorian state government as a statutory authority in 1974 to administer provisions of the Historic Buildings Act 1974.

The Council considered nominations to the Register of Historic Buildings (for privately owned historic buildings) and the Government Buildings Register (for government owned buildings). Buildings were considered for addition to the registers on the basis of their architectural and historical significance. The Council also had the power to issue permits for alterations to registered buildings. It was also responsible for commissioning some of the first heritage studies in the state.

The HBPC was replaced by Heritage Victoria.
