= English, Scottish and Australian Bank, Ascot Vale =

Former bank building in Melbourne, Victoria, Australia

General information
- Status: Completed
- Type: Bank branch (1884–1972); Commercial office (c. 1980s– )
- Architectural style: Italianate Gothic Revival
- Location: 403-405 Mount Alexander Road, Ascot Vale, Melbourne, Victoria, Australia
- Coordinates: 37°46′28″S 144°55′39″E
- Completed: 1884; 142 years ago
- Closed: June 1972 (as a bank)
- Client: English, Scottish and Australian Chartered Bank
- Owner: Private owner

Technical details
- Material: Bricks; slate; timber; ceramic tiles; brass fittings
- Floor count: 2

Design and construction
- Architecture firm: Terry and Oakden

Victorian Heritage Register
- Official name: ES&A Bank building
- Type: Registered place
- Designated: 10 August 2017
- Reference no.: H1287
- Heritage overlay no.: HO83
- Category: Commercial

The Ascot Vale branch of the English, Scottish and Australian Bank, also known as the English, Scottish and Australian Chartered Bank and abbreviated as the ES&A Bank, is a heritage-listed former branch office of the English, Scottish and Australian Chartered Bank, located on Mount Alexander Road in Ascot Vale, an inner western suburb of Melbourne, in Victoria, Australia. Built in 1884, the building ceased being used as a bank branch in 1972 and was subsequently repurposed for other commercial use.

The former bank building was added to the Victorian Heritage Register on 10 August 2017 in recognition of its architectural importance.

== Description ==
The English Scottish and Australian Chartered Bank opened a branch in nearby Flemington in c. 1875. The current bank was designed by the notable architectural partnership Terry and Oakden and built in 1884; and is the finest of six Italianate Gothic Revival bank buildings designed by the firm. In Victoria the Gothic Revival style of architecture was peculiar to the ES&A Bank, because it was the preferred style of the Bank's general manager, Sir George Frederic Verdon, who held office from 1871–1891.

The building continued to operate as bank until June 1972 and closed following the merger of the ES&A Bank with ANZ Bank to form the Australia and New Zealand Banking Group Limited. The building was acquired by a private owner, renovated, and was used as a commercial office.

In 2025, the Victorian branch of the English-Speaking Union reported as being the owner of the building and was preparing to divest ownership, citing that the resources required to continue to operate the sizeable heritage property outweigh the benefits of retaining ownership.

The former bank a two-storey Italian gothic style polychromatic brick building with a prominent, quadruple parapeted, gabled roof of slate. It is substantially intact and in excellent condition following an extensive renovation. Of particular note is the way in which the building makes excellent use of the corner site and the incised decoration of the rose/thistle/gumnut in the stone spandrels at the three windows around the corner.

== See also ==
- Architecture of Melbourne
- English, Scottish and Australian Bank, Hawthorn
- English, Scottish and Australian Bank, Hawthorn East
- English, Scottish and Australian Bank, The Rocks
- List of places on the Victorian Heritage Register in the City of Moonee Valley
