= English, Scottish and Australian Bank, Hawthorn =

Heritage-listed former bank building in Melbourne, Victoria, Australia

- The former bank building in 2023

- Location of the former bank building in Greater Metropolitan Melbourne
- Alternative names: ES&A Bank, Hawthorn; Manresa People's Centre

General information
- Status: Completed
- Type: Bank branch (1873–1923); Community centre (since 1923– )
- Architectural style: Ecclesiastic Victorian Gothic Revival
- Location: 343 Burwood Road, Hawthorn, City of Boroondara, Melbourne, Victoria, Australia
- Coordinates: 37°49′19″S 145°02′06″E
- Completed: 1873; 153 years ago
- Owner: Roman Catholic Trust Corporation (since 1923)

Technical details
- Material: Bricks; slate; limestone; bluestone; timber

Design and construction
- Main contractor: Overend and Robb

Victorian Heritage Register
- Official name: ES&A Bank, Hawthorn (former); (Manresa People's Centre)
- Type: Registered place
- Designated: 5 May 1982
- Reference no.: VHR H0516
- Heritage overlay no.: HO24
- Categories: Commercial; Residential buildings (private)

Register of the National Estate
- Official name: ES&A Bank, Hawthorn East (former)
- Type: Defunct register
- Designated: 30 June 1992
- Reference no.: 5669

The Hawthorn branch of the English, Scottish and Australian Bank, also known as the English, Scottish and Australian Chartered Bank and abbreviated as the ES&A Bank, is a heritage-listed former bank branch office of the English, Scottish and Australian Chartered Bank, now known as the Manresa People's Centre, located at 343 Burwood Road in Hawthorn, in the City of Boroondara, in the inner eastern suburbs of Melbourne, in Victoria, Australia.

Built in 1873 on the traditional lands of the Wurundjeri people, the former bank building was added to the Victorian Heritage Register on 5 May 1982 in recognition of its historical and architectural significance; and was also added to the non-statutory and now defunct Register of the National Estate on 30 June 1992.

== History ==
The former ES&A Bank building was designed by Leonard Terry and built by contractors Overend and Robb. The bank, one of the largest financiers of suburban builders, was constructed in Hawthorn to provide facilities for the Melbourne land boom underway in Camberwell after the extension of the railway line from Hawthorn in 1861. However, the bank branch subsequently became isolated from the commercial precinct after the extension of the railway to Glenferrie in 1880 and closed.

In 1923, the building was purchased by the Roman Catholic Trust Corporation and renamed as the Manresa People's Centre, a spiritual retreat centre.

== Description ==
The building was constructed in the Ecclesiastic Victorian Gothic Revival style in Hawthorn bricks with gable slate roofs, and with dressings of Waurn Ponds limestone on a bluestone foundation. The two-storey building was intended to house the banking chamber and offices on the ground floor and accommodation for the manager at the rear and on the first floor. It retains a grand staircase hall with Minton-tiled flooring and Gothic timber stairs. The first floor drawing room also retains a stencilled ceiling and cornice decorations. It has a strong central entrance and arcades with quatrefoil stone balustrades on both the first and second floor. Other features include the tall chimneys, high gables and slate roofs. Some of these features and the mouldings are executed in the limestone and not stucco, as was often the case.

Though the decorative iron ridge capping has been removed there is still a fine iron weather vane on the roof of the dining room wing. The building is T shaped in plan and comprises two main floors plus an attic storey over all but the rearmost end of the building, which is two storeyed. The interior is also consistently detailed in Gothic Revival motifs. The head of the T abuts the road frontage and contained the banking chamber at ground floor level, receiving rooms and residence bedrooms at first floor level and servants' rooms in the attic storey.

This is most unusual as most bank buildings in the nineteenth century were designed in Victorian Free Classical styles and the minority with Gothic-based designs tended to be purer in derivation. In Victoria the Gothic Revival style of architecture was peculiar to the ES&A Bank, because it was the preferred style of the Bank's general manager, Sir George Frederic Verdon, who held office from 1871 to 1891. Sir George was well known and respected for his service in the Victorian Parliament and his extensive work in developing a broad range of the arts and sciences in Victoria.

== See also ==
- Architecture of Melbourne
- English, Scottish and Australian Bank, Ascot Vale
- English, Scottish and Australian Bank, The Rocks
- List of places on the Victorian Heritage Register in the City of Boroondara
