= English, Scottish and Australian Bank, Hawthorn East =

Heritage building in Melbourne, Australia

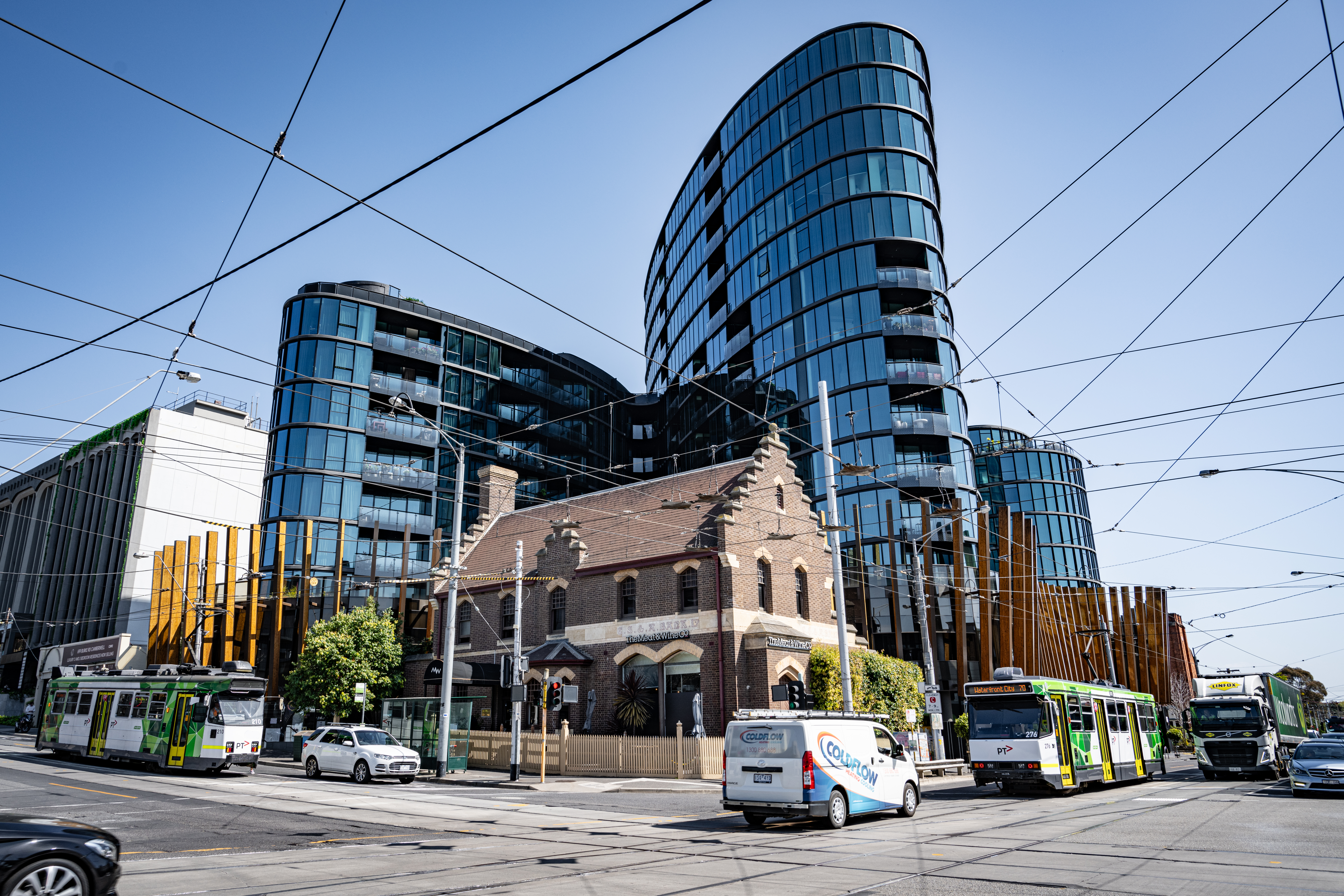
- The former bank branch (centre), dwarfed by the residential apartments in 2024

- Location of the former bank building in Greater Metropolitan Melbourne
- Alternative names: ES&A Bank, Hawthorn East

General information
- Status: Completed
- Type: Bank branch (former); Offices (former); Restaurant
- Architectural style: Victorian Gothic Revial
- Location: 482 Riversdale Road, Hawthorn East, City of Boroondara, Melbourne, Victoria, Australia
- Coordinates: 37°49′53″S 145°03′23″E
- Completed: 1885; 141 years ago

Technical details
- Material: Tuck-pointed bricks; slate; cast iron

Design and construction
- Architects: William Wardell; Walter Liberty Vernon
- Main contractor: Alfred George Moore

Victorian Heritage Register
- Official name: ES&A Bank, Hawthorn East (former)
- Type: Registered place
- Designated: 14 July 1982
- Reference no.: VHR H0534
- Heritage overlay no.: HO18
- Categories: Finance; Commercial

Register of the National Estate
- Official name: ES&A Bank, Hawthorn East (former)
- Type: Defunct register
- Designated: 30 June 1992
- Reference no.: 15393

The Hawthorn East branch of the English, Scottish and Australian Bank, also known as the English, Scottish and Australian Chartered Bank and abbreviated as the ES&A Bank, is a heritage-listed former bank branch office of the English, Scottish and Australian Chartered Bank, now restaurant, located at what is known as Camberwell Junction, at 482 Riversdale Road, on the corner of Burke Road, (Note: The Australian Heritage Database lists the address as 705 Burke Road.) in Hawthorn East, in the City of Boroondara, in the inner eastern suburbs of Melbourne, in Victoria, Australia.

Built in 1885 on the traditional lands of the Wurundjeri people, the former bank building was added to the Victorian Heritage Register on 14 July 1982 in recognition of its historical and architectural significance; and was also added to the non-statutory and now defunct Register of the National Estate on 30 June 1992.

== History ==
The former ES&A Bank building was designed by the prominent architects William Wardell and Walter Liberty Vernon. The bank, one of the largest financiers of suburban builders, was constructed in East Hawthorn to provide facilities for the Melbourne land boom underway in Camberwell after the extension of the railway line from Hawthorn in 1882. The contractor was Alfred George Moore.

After ceasing use as a bank building, the building was repurposed as offices for Henlys Motors, motor vehicle dealers. In 2008, development approval was given to redevelop the site comprising 144 apartments, called Aerial apartments, designed by Marsh Wood Architects, located at 472–480 Riversdale Road, that was completed in November 2012. The former bank building, isolated from the residential apartments, was tenanted to The Meat & Wine Co restaurant and the building was sold in 2018 for $4.75 million.

== Description ==
The former bank is a two-storey building, constructed of chocolate brown, tuck-pointed brick. The roof is slate with prominent stepped gables, the steps marked with render. There are tall brick chimneys which accentuate the verticality of the building, especially one on the south face where one rises from the gable end. The roof retained its original cast iron plumbing. The windows are arched lancet sashes with rendering to define the sills and tops.

The building is situated on a corner and the main entrance is from Riversdale Road through a projecting porch with arched doorway. The Burke Road elevation fenestration includes a centrally located bay window on the ground floor. There is a small but distinct stepped parapet at the roofline over this central location. On all sides the rectangular lancet sash windows have large panes at ground floor level but on the first floor have clear lower panes and the upper sash divided into sixteen smaller panes with heavy glazing bars. The interior of the building was originally designed as both a bank and a residence, the banking facility to the Riversdale frontage and the residence to Bourke Street. The bay window looking over Bourke Street was that of the dining room.

In 1961 the former bank was refurbished with the demolition of a centrally-located chimney. An unsympathetic canopy was added to the rear, new show windows were added into cut down window openings and the main entry door was replaced. The building's interior was remodelled and the original staircase and varnished ceiling over the former banking chamber were retained. As of May 1990, the exterior had the basic elements of its design and the building was maintained in good condition.

=== Architectural style ===
The design is a picturesque eclectic mixture of Victorian Gothic Revival with Tudor, Dutch, and Arts and Crafts influences. This is most unusual as most bank buildings in the nineteenth century were designed in Victorian Free Classical styles and the minority with Gothic-based designs tended to be purer in derivation. In Victoria the Gothic Revival style of architecture was peculiar to the ES&A Bank, because it was the preferred style of the Bank's general manager, Sir George Frederic Verdon, who held office from 1871 to 1891.

The Camberwell Junction bank building was also stylistically advanced for its time, a precursor of the trend towards using a greater variety of styles, details and materials in new ways; as seen in the face brickwork and window glazing. This innovation could have arisen because prior to 1884 all the ES&A bank buildings were designed by Leonard Terry. When Terry died in 1884, new architects were engaged. This building is one of the few designs built in Victoria by the Sydney firm of Wardell and Vernon, who were subsequently contracted to design other ES&A Bank buildings, including in The Rocks in Sydney, completed in 1886.

== See also ==
- Architecture of Melbourne
- English, Scottish and Australian Bank, Ascot Vale
- List of places on the Victorian Heritage Register in the City of Boroondara
