= Fortune of War Hotel =

Heritage-listed pub in Sydney, Australia

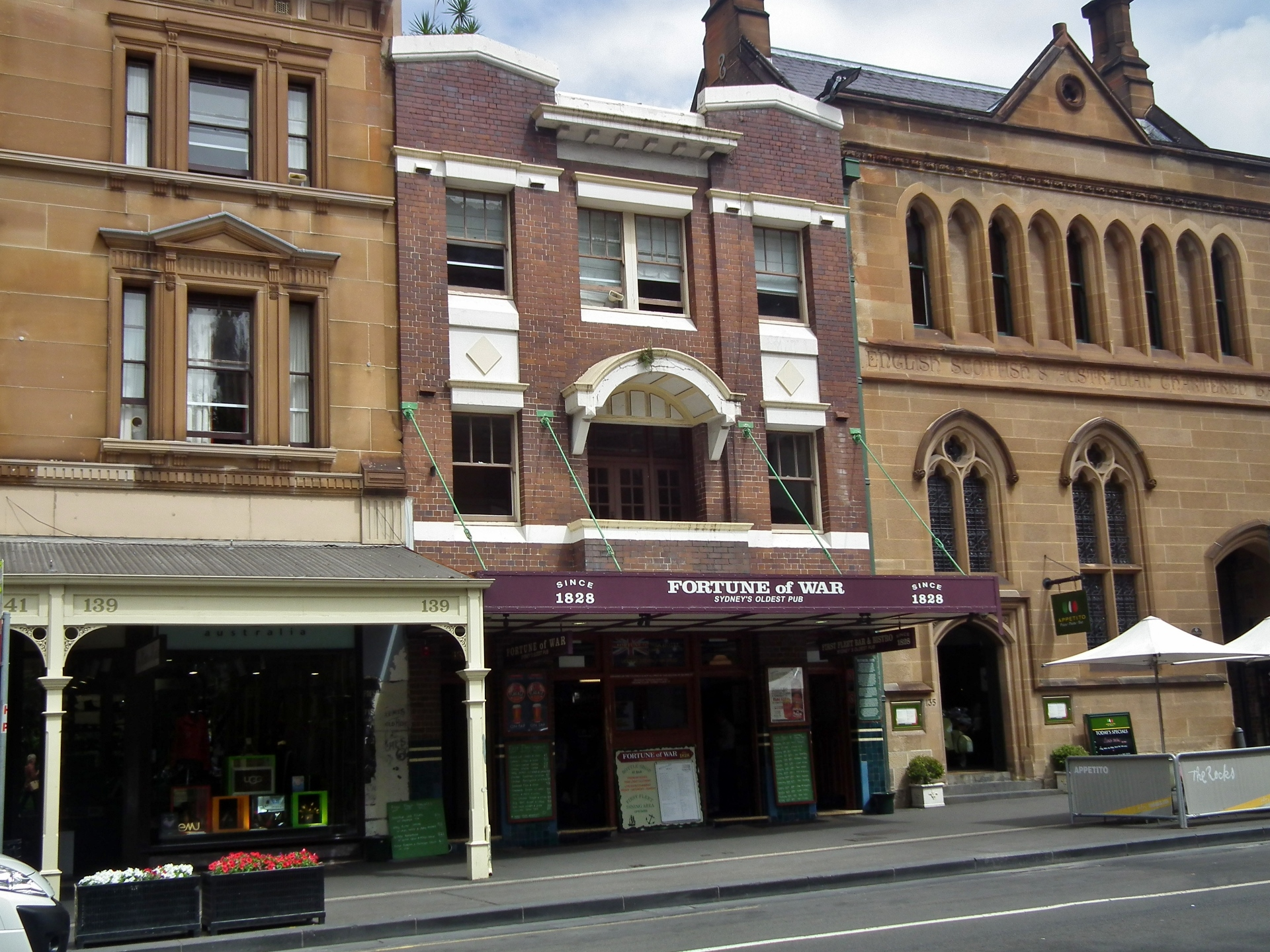
- The Fortune of War Hotel in 2014

- Location within Sydney Location within Australia
- 33.8604°S 151.2083°E
- Location: 137 George Street, The Rocks, City of Sydney, New South Wales, Australia

History
- Built: 1820s; 1921
- Built for: Samuel Terry (1820s); Tooth & Co. (1921)

Site notes
- Architect: Tooth and Co. resident architect
- Architectural style: Federation Free Style
- Owner: Property NSW

New South Wales Heritage Register
- Official name: Fortune of War Hotel
- Type: State heritage (built)
- Designated: 10 May 2002
- Reference no.: 1547
- Type: Hotel
- Category: Commercial
- Builders: H. J. & H. W. Thompson

The Fortune of War Hotel is a heritage-listed pub located at 137 George Street, in the inner city Sydney suburb of The Rocks in the City of Sydney local government area of New South Wales, Australia. It was designed by the Tooth & Co. resident architect and built in 1922 by H. J. & H. W. Thompson. The property is owned by Property NSW, an agency of the Government of New South Wales. It was added to the New South Wales State Heritage Register on 10 May 2002.

First built in 1828, the Fortune of War advertises itself as "Sydney's oldest pub". However, since the present building only dates from 1922, the title is contested by the Lord Nelson Hotel (1835) and the Hero of Waterloo Hotel (1843).

== History ==
The site of the Fortune of War was originally part of the first hospital, erected in 1788. By 1790 the original tent hospital had been replaced by a portable hospital which came out with the Second Fleet. After the Rum Hospital opened in 1816 in Macquarie Street the buildings on George Street were demolished and the site became an early quarry.

=== Ownership by Samuel Terry ===
The site of the Fortune of War was formalised in the survey of the township carried out in the early 1830s, the site was classified as Lot 7 of City Section 84, comprising an area of 1 rod 15 perches. In January 1841 the allotment was officially granted to the trustees, executrix and executors of the estate of the emancipist Samuel Terry, these being Rosetta Terry (widow), John Terry Hughes (nephew and son-in-law), Tom White Melville Winder of Windermere (family friend and long standing business acquaintance) and James Norton (solicitor).

Terry's interest in the site seems to date from at least c. 1823 when an area of "26 rods" situated on the "west side of George Street" was leased to Terry for the term of 21 years. Terry arrived in Sydney in 1801 on a seven-year sentence convicted of theft. He was eventually described as the "Botany Bay Rothschild" and at his death in 1838 left a personal estate of £250,000, an annual rental income from his Sydney properties of £10,000 and "land and property which defies assessment". Terry's business interests included brewing and he was occasionally a publican. On the site of the Fortune of War, Terry constructed a terrace of three buildings (today's 139-143 George Street) completed in the mid to late 1820s. The footprint of this building, a terrace of three with a breakfront is marked in the Robert Russell survey of 1834.

==== Conversion as a hotel ====
The building was constructed as a Public House known as "The Fortune of War". The first recorded licensee of the public house was John Boreham in 1830 for the sale of wines, malt and liquor. Many publicans were former artisans such as stonemasons, like Boreham, a former miller. In the 1822 Land and Stock Muster Boreham was listed as a miller in government employ on a 14-year sentence. 1828 he was listed in the census as a former convict who arrived in Sydney in 1815 on the "Marquis of Wellington" and employed at that time as a dealer.

From 1833 the publican of the Fortune of War was Walter Nottingham Palmer, where he remained until 1839 when he took over the licence of the New York Tavern, also on George Street. In 1844 the lease of the Fortune of War was renewed by Robert White Moore, although he had held the licence from 1842. The lease was again renewed in 1851 for a further seven years. During this period Moore held a late-night (midnight) licence.

In 1861 Moore acquired the freehold ownership of the property through a purchase from Thomas Smart. Smart's interest in the property originated from a mortgage taken out in 1851 and the partition of the Terry Estate made in 1860. Robert White Moore continued to hold the licence for the hotel up until the time of his death in 1870 when it passed to his relatives. Thomas Moore held it for the 1870 and 1880s and his nephew Benjamin Robert Moore for the 1890s. During this period the hotel was managed by the following publicans:

- 1873–c. 1878 – Mrs Frances Cowell
- 1879–1880 – Alexander Yeend
- c. 1881–1893 – Arthur Buchanan
- 1894 – James Irving
- 1895 – James McGuire
- 1896 – William Biscoff
- 1897–1899 – Hector Allen Bogle
- 1900 – Archibald Laing

The commercial success of The Fortune of War is indicated by the continual licensing of the premises from at least 1830.

=== Resumption by the NSW Government ===
The bubonic plague broke out on the waterfront in January 1900, prompting the Government to resume the entire Rocks and Millers Point area. Large scale demolitions followed and the area was administered by the Sydney Harbour Trust, then the Maritime Services Board and in 1970 The Rocks was handed to the Sydney Cove Redevelopment Authority.

The Fortune of War continued to trade until 1920 when Tooth & Co. Ltd. entered into a head-lease with the Sydney Harbour Trust for 45 years. Shortly after this the 19th-century building was demolished and the extant hotel constructed. The first month of trading in the new building was in December 1921. In March 1976 Tooth & Co relinquished their head lease to the Sydney Cove Redevelopment Authority. Since that date leases have been granted to the following publicans:

- 1978–1987 John Walker Hook and
- 1987–present (2009) Robert John Keyes.

Keyes was also one of the lessees of the Russell Hotel at 143 George Street and the operation of the two properties merged at this time. The Fortune of War Hotel with its longstanding licence and retention of original bar and fittings contributes to The Rocks as a unique historic neighbourhood.

== Description ==
The Fortune of War Hotel is a three-storey face brick building with stucco detailing, of which much remains. It shows the Californian Bungalow style as applied to a commercial hotel building.

The building has three levels to George Street and a modern rear addition, built in a traditional style. The building has a central recessed balcony on the first floor and a parapet wall to the street. There is an awning over the footpath, typical of those along George Street. Externally, to George Street, original wall tiles, face brickwork, rendered trim, and terrazzo thresholds remain intact. Timber doors and windows appear in good condition. Internally, the general layout of public areas appears original, including features such as wall tiles, ceilings, central bar and other joinery. The original stair to upper level bedrooms remains, but is blocked off. The rear area is a half level above the George Street ground floor level.

There appears to be no above ground evidence of the original building on the site. The existing building (built by 1922) is relatively intact.

There have been major changes upstairs, with links to the Russell Hotel.

== Heritage listing ==
The Fortune of War Hotel and site are of State heritage significance for their historical and scientific cultural values. The site and building are also of State heritage significance for their contribution to The Rocks area which is of State Heritage significance in its own right.

The site demonstrates longevity of European use that is historically associated with the early colonial development in Sydney in being part of the first general hospital (1788-1816) and part of a stone terrace erected for Samuel Terry in c. 1830 which became The Fortune of War Hotel

The building employs robust brick architecture typical of the 1920/30s. The building makes a positive contribution to the general streetscape. It remains relatively intact in its presentation to the street, retaining original features such as wall tiles, face brick, rendered trim and other features. Internally, the main public areas also retain much of their original form and detail, including the wall tile, bar and other joinery.

The Fortune of War Hotel has social significance as an important feature in The Rocks Conservation area, and contributes strongly to the character of The Rocks. The Hotel has social significance in its traditional role as a meeting place and abode of working men within The Rocks area, and continues to provide the service for which it was designed to not only the local residents but also to visitors to the area. The community holds the Fortune of War Hotel in esteem as evidenced by its inclusion on walking tours, and its listings on the registers of the National Estate, the Institute of Architects and the National Trust.

The Fortune of War Hotel is representative of a type of building traditionally associated with a meeting place and abode for working men within the traditional mixed residential, industrial, commercial and maritime uses of The Rocks area.

Fortune of War Hotel was listed on the New South Wales State Heritage Register on 10 May 2002 having satisfied the following criteria.

The place is important in demonstrating the course, or pattern, of cultural or natural history in New South Wales.

The Fortune of War Hotel and site are of State heritage significance for their historical and scientific cultural values. The site and building are also of State heritage significance for their contribution to The Rocks area which is of State Heritage significance in its own right.

The item meets this criterion at a state level owing to the longevity of European use of the site, which is associated with the early colonial development in Sydney in being part of the general hospital site (1788-1816) and part of a stone terrace of three constructed for Samuel Terry. The subsequent continuous use of the site as a hotel is closely associated with the later economic and social development of The Rocks area as a place of residence and travellers.

The place has a strong or special association with a person, or group of persons, of importance of cultural or natural history of New South Wales's history.

The item is associated with Samuel Terry, known as the Botany Bay Rothschild for his astute business dealings. Terry owned the site and had the original Fortune of War constructed upon it.

The place is important in demonstrating aesthetic characteristics and/or a high degree of creative or technical achievement in New South Wales.

The building employs robust brick architecture typical of the 1920/30s as such it is an important example of an inter-war era hotel premises in the Federation Free Style that retains key features of licensed hotel architecture of the day in the wall tiles, bar area and joinery in general. The building makes a positive contribution to the general streetscape. It remains relatively intact in its presentation to the street, retaining original features such as wall tiles, face brick, rendered trim and other features. The façade contributes to the streetscape of George Street in The Rocks, which is the most intact 19th and early 20th century streetscape in the city.

The place has a strong or special association with a particular community or cultural group in New South Wales for social, cultural or spiritual reasons.

The Fortune of War Hotel has social significance as an important feature in The Rocks Conservation area, and contributes strongly to the character of The Rocks. The Hotel has social significance in its traditional role as a meeting place and abode of working men within The Rocks area, and continues to provide the service for which it was designed to not only the local residents but also to visitors to the area. The community holds the Fortune of War Hotel in esteem as evidenced by its inclusion on walking tours, and its listings on the registers of the National Estate, the Institute of Architects and the National Trust.

The place has potential to yield information that will contribute to an understanding of the cultural or natural history of New South Wales.

The item meets this criterion at a local level owing to rarity of type and integrity which has potential to reveal new information about the building and its stylistic attributes. The item meets this criterion at a local level owing to the potential of the site to reveal evidence of earlier site uses and structures.

The place possesses uncommon, rare or endangered aspects of the cultural or natural history of New South Wales.

The item meets this criterion at a state level as a unique example of an inter-war era licensed hotel that retains its public bar top hamper within one of the few authentic historic interiors in The Rocks accessible to the public,

The place is important in demonstrating the principal characteristics of a class of cultural or natural places/environments in New South Wales.

The Fortune of War Hotel is representative of a type of building traditionally associated with a meeting place and abode for working men within the traditional mixed residential, industrial, commercial and maritime uses of The Rocks area.

== See also ==
- List of oldest companies in Australia
- Australian non-residential architectural styles
- English, Scottish and Australian Bank
- 139–141 George Street
