= Alia College =

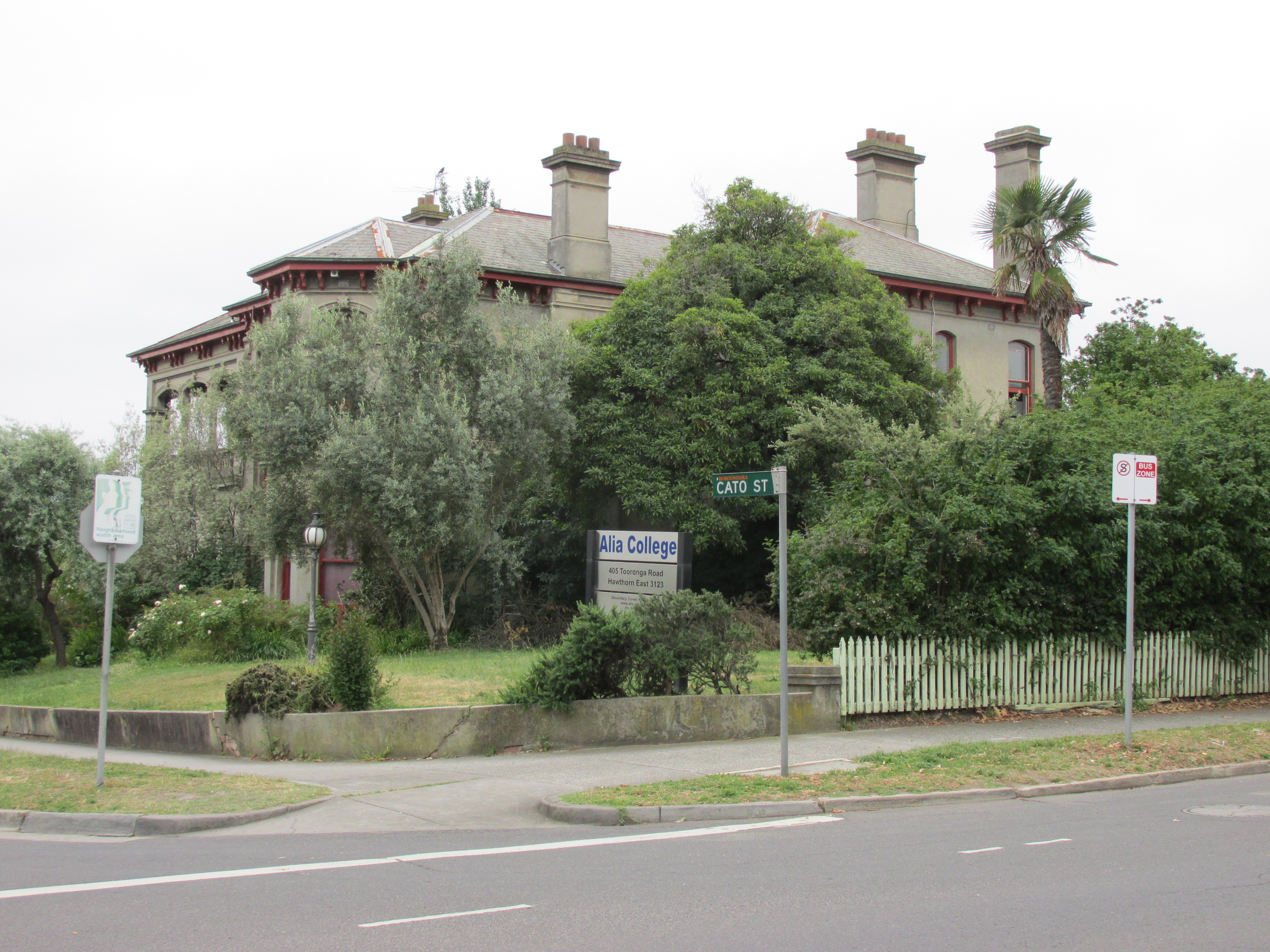
- Alia College, in 2014

Location
- Hawthorn East, Melbourne, Victoria, Australia; North-Eastern Victoria; 37°50′36″S 145°02′42″E

Information
- Type: Independent alternative secondary school
- Opened: 1999; 27 years ago
- School number: 1981
- Principal: Robert Morgan
- Years offered: 7–12
- Enrollment: 65
- Education system: VCE
- Website: www.alia.vic.edu.au

Alia College is an independent co-educational alternative secondary school located in Hawthorn East, Melbourne, Victoria, Australia. The school is built around values of tolerance, creativity, self-expression, respect and responsibility. Advertising itself as a "non rule-based school", Alia College does not have a school uniform, allows its students to leave the school premises and does not impose any formal punishments such as detentions. Despite this unorthodox approach, however, Alia teaches a standard curriculum, with Latin being a compulsory subject (7–9).

== History ==
Alia College was started in 1999, by Bob Morgan, an educator with over 40 years of teaching experience. In an effort to create an environment different from those of mainstream schools, Bob, together with like-minded educators, sought to create a school with positive effects on stress levels and academic performance and gave students "a real voice."

In 2013, Alia College was in the top five schools by Year 9 NAPLAN results in the Reading, Spelling, and Grammar and Punctuation categories.

== About ==
The name "Alia" was suggested by a parent, because of the school's Latin program. It comes from the Latin phrase "inter alia", meaning "among other (things)".

In 2006, Alia College moved into the heritage-listed Italianate-styled Kawarau, a former mansion built in 1893 for Robert Robinson; extended in 1904 by merchant and philanthropist Frederick Cato; home for Stephanie Alexander AO from 1989 to 2014; when it was purchased by the school.

Alia College provides the same curriculum as mainstream schools, but differs in its approach to delivery in many ways. These include teachers being on a first-name basis with students, no bells, no school uniform, a lack of a rigid punishment system, and emphasis on respect.

== Student body ==
Alia College has a small student body, with fewer than 100 students. Though the school is not specially set up for students with learning difficulties, those students are welcome at Alia College.

The school is also registered to enrol international students, and has had an international student program consistently since 2014. International students can study at Alia College for short periods (2–3 weeks), a term, or for years. The Japanese program regularly runs a short-term visit for students from Kasaoka, Japan. Student exchanges are also possible for Alia College students, with French and Japanese language programs running to a VCE level. The school has also seen the growth of a French exchange program since 2016.

== See also ==
- List of schools in Victoria
- Victorian Certificate of Education
- Alternative education
