= 139–141 George Street, The Rocks =

Heritage-listed building in Sydney, Australia

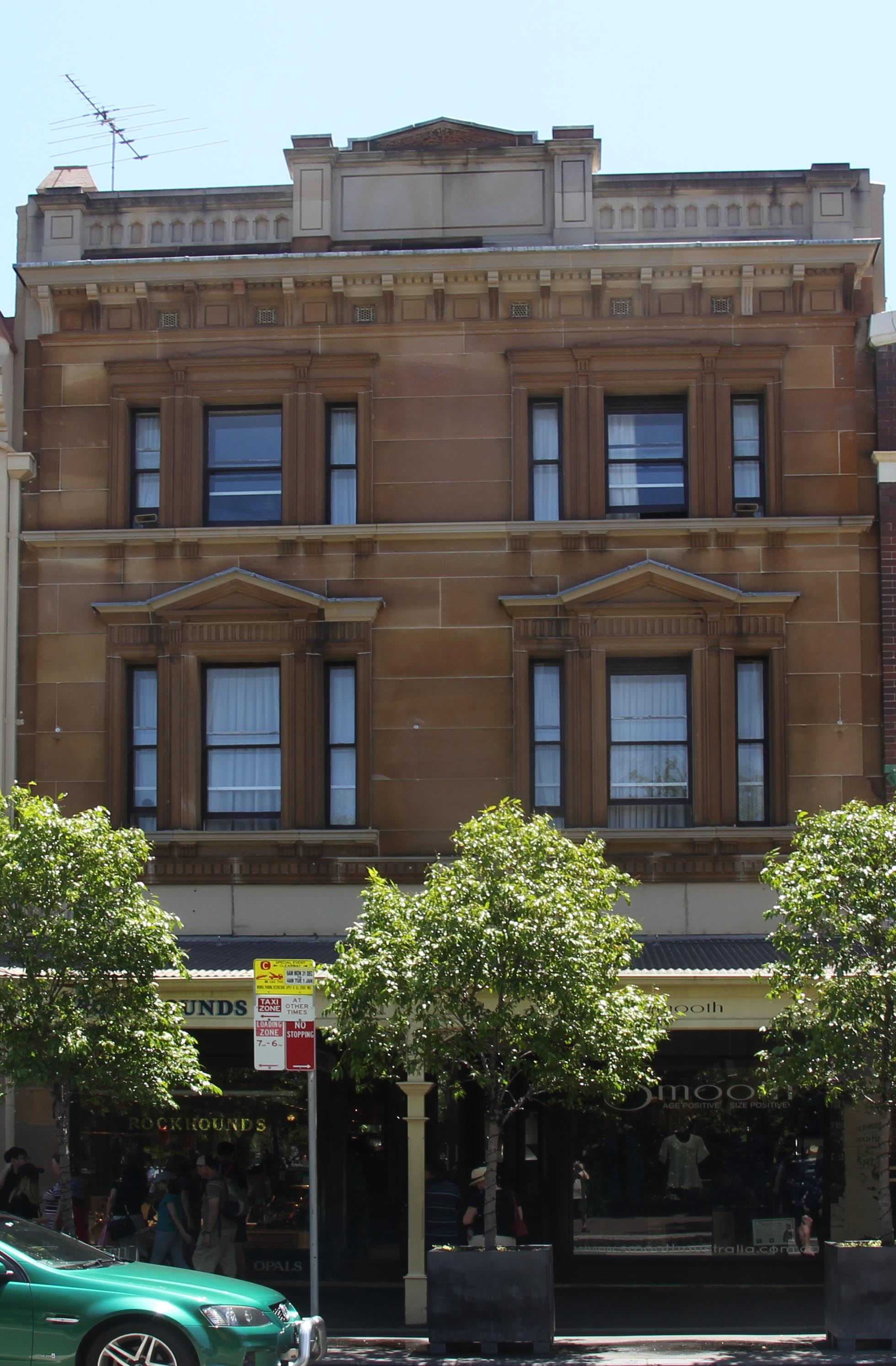
- The George Street sandstone facade of 139-141 George Street, pictured in 2019.

- Location within Sydney Location within Australia
- 33.8604°S 151.2083°E
- Location: 139–141 George Street, The Rocks, City of Sydney, New South Wales, Australia

History
- Built: 1881–1882

Site notes
- Architectural style: Classical Revival
- Owner: Property NSW

New South Wales Heritage Register
- Official name: Shops and Residences - stone; three storey stone building
- Type: State heritage (built)
- Designated: 10 May 2002
- Reference no.: 1595
- Type: Shop
- Category: Residential buildings (private)

139–141 George Street are heritage-listed former terrace houses and now shops located at 139–141 George Street in the inner city Sydney suburb of The Rocks in the City of Sydney local government area of New South Wales, Australia. It was built from 1881 to 1882. It is also known as three storey stone building. The property is owned by Property NSW, an agency of the Government of New South Wales. It was added to the New South Wales State Heritage Register on 10 May 2002.

== History ==
The site was originally part of the first hospital complex from 1788, the 1790 portable hospital was constructed here after the arrival of the Second Fleet. When the Sydney Hospital moved to Macquarie Street in 1816 the vacant land was set aside as a government quarry. In the general survey of the town undertaken in the 1830s, the site was classified as Lot 7 of City Section 84 and comprised an area of 1 rood 15 perches. In January 1841 the allotment was officially granted to the trustees, executrix and executors of the estate of Samuel Terry.

Terry's interest in the property dates from at least c. 1823 when an area of "26 rods" on the "west side of George Street" with a description that approximates that of the George Street half of Lot 7 of City Section 84 was leased by the government to Terry for 21 years. Terry was an emancipist, he arrived in Sydney in 1801 convicted of theft under a seven-year sentence. By the time of the expiration of his sentence he was established as a merchant in Parramatta and in 1809 was the owner of a farm on the Hawkesbury River. He moved to Sydney in 1810 where he opened a public house in Pitt Street and married Rosetta Marsh, a woman of considerable business acumen. During Governor Macquarie's administration the Terry's business interests prospered where "he held more than a fifth of the toal value of mortgages registered in the colony". He became known as the "Botany Bay Rothschild", at the time of his death in 1838 he left a personal estate of £250 000, an annual rental income from his Sydney properties of £10 000 and "land property which defies description".

On the site of 139–141 George Street, Terry constructed a terrace of three buildings (today's 139–143 George Street) on his allotment. They were evidently completed in the mid to late 1820s, and they appear on the Hoddle, Larmer and Mitchell "Map of Sydney" of 1831. The few available images of the buildings suggest a substantial structure of three stories with a prominent breakout capped by a closed pediment.

The terraces were constructed for general retail outlets, as they are today. From the mid-1840s tenants of the premises are listed in street directories and council rate assessments. The first of these is for the years 1842–1845 when Isaac Moore, dealer, traded from premises with a street address of no. 663 Lower George Street. Isaac Moore, incidentally, was also the licensed publican of the adjoining Patent Slip Hotel around this time. Between 1849 and the mid-1850s the tenants were the Downes family (John and Eliza) who operated a clothing store (described as a "slop warehouse" and 'general outfitter'). Toward the end of the 1850s, in 1857 the building was leased by Andrew Bogle who operated a boarding house. Bogle was succeeded by Mrs Ballantyne in 1858 who with John Ballantyne for the period 1859 to 1861 leased the premises as a drapery store.

The property was held by Samuel Terry's widow and principal trustee, Rosetta, until her death in 1858. For a short period after this her real property was controlled by Mrs Rebecca Fox until June 1860 when the estate was partitioned. The beneficiary of this part of the estate was William Whaley Billyard, the crown solicitor of New South Wales. Shortly after, Billyard sold the property to William Reilly for £1,762. (Reilly also acquired title to the neighbouring Russell Hotel site at the same time). Coincidental with the commencement of Reilly's ownership, street directory entries from 1863 for the premises ceased, but as the building was extant this may suggest it was either left vacant (as stated in a Council rate assessment return for 1863) or, conceivably, became part of the operation of the hotel on the Russell Hotel site, the Patent Slip, for a period. By 1866 the building had been demolished and from 1867 the street directories and rate assessments list the address as "vacant land".

In June 1877 the property was transferred back into the ownership of William Whaley Billyard. In July 1881 the property was transferred into the ownership of Leo Ferdinand Sachs (further details on Sachs are not known). At the same time Sachs entered into the first of a number of mortgages made in the early 1880s, the last of which was discharged in 1886. These mortgages may have been used by Sachs to erect the extant building, which was under construction in 1882 and completed by the end of that year. The new premises provided a pair of shops fronting George Street with the street addresses of No. 139 and 141. The first tenant was William Howes, a tailor and clothier, occupant of both No. 139 and 141 in 1885. Ownership was then transferred in June 1885 to auctioneers Edmund Compton Batt and John Mitchell Purves. Batt and Purves' interest in the property was short lived and after securing two tenants in August 1886 Thomas Cripps, confectioner, for no. 141 and Thomas Selig, pawnbroker, for no. 139 (although actually tenanted by Joseph Selig, tailor and clothier)) sold the property to the Earl of Carnarvon, whose financial interests in Australia were managed by the financier and politician Sir William Patrick Manning (1845–1915). Selig continued to lease no. 139 until 1887, while Cripps' lease of no. 141 ceased during 1889. In February 1888 Thomas Stephen Small purchased the property and retained ownership until the government resumption of 1900. During these twelve years of Small's freehold ownership, No. 139 George Street was principally used as a restaurant and neighbouring no.141 had mixed uses as a chemist, butcher and confectionary. The use of the upper floors at this time would seem to have been for accommodation associated with the restaurant operations. A photograph of the neighbouring The Fortune of War Hotel of around 1906 includes a glimpse of the shopfront and awning of No. 139 George Street with advertising for rooms.

The plague outbreak in January 1900 prompted the government to resume the entire Rocks and Millers Point area. To administer the resumed area a number of government authorities were established, The Rocks was administered by the Sydney Harbour Trust and its successor the Maritime Services Board until 1970.

Initially under Government ownership the respective premises continued to function in a similar manner as to when the properties were held in freehold title. No. 139 for example continued as a restaurant although operated by a succession of different proprietors (with a short interim between 1909 and 1910 when it was leased by Isaac Levy, clothier). No. 141 continued to be leased from 1900 until 1913 by F. G. Erler, chemist. Following Erler in 1914 was F. A. Benson who initially traded as a chemist until 1923 and between 1924 and 1928 as an accountant. From 1929 up to the 1950s the premises were leased by John George Peek, chemist. During 1930s Peek also entered into a lease of the adjoining premises at No. 139, trading as an optometrist.

In November 1987, the proprietors of the Russell Hotel (Russell Hotel Pty. Ltd.) acquired the lease of the two upper floors of No. 139–141 George Street as part of a scheme to amalgamate the trading operations of the Fortune of War (No. 137 George Street) and the Russell Hotel (No. 143 George Street). The ground floor shops however of No. 139–141 George Street continued to operate under separate lease arrangements. In 1985, for example, No. 139 was leased by Rentoul Pty. Ltd. trading as the Sheepskin Shop, and No. 141 was leased by Dinallo's Fruit Shop.

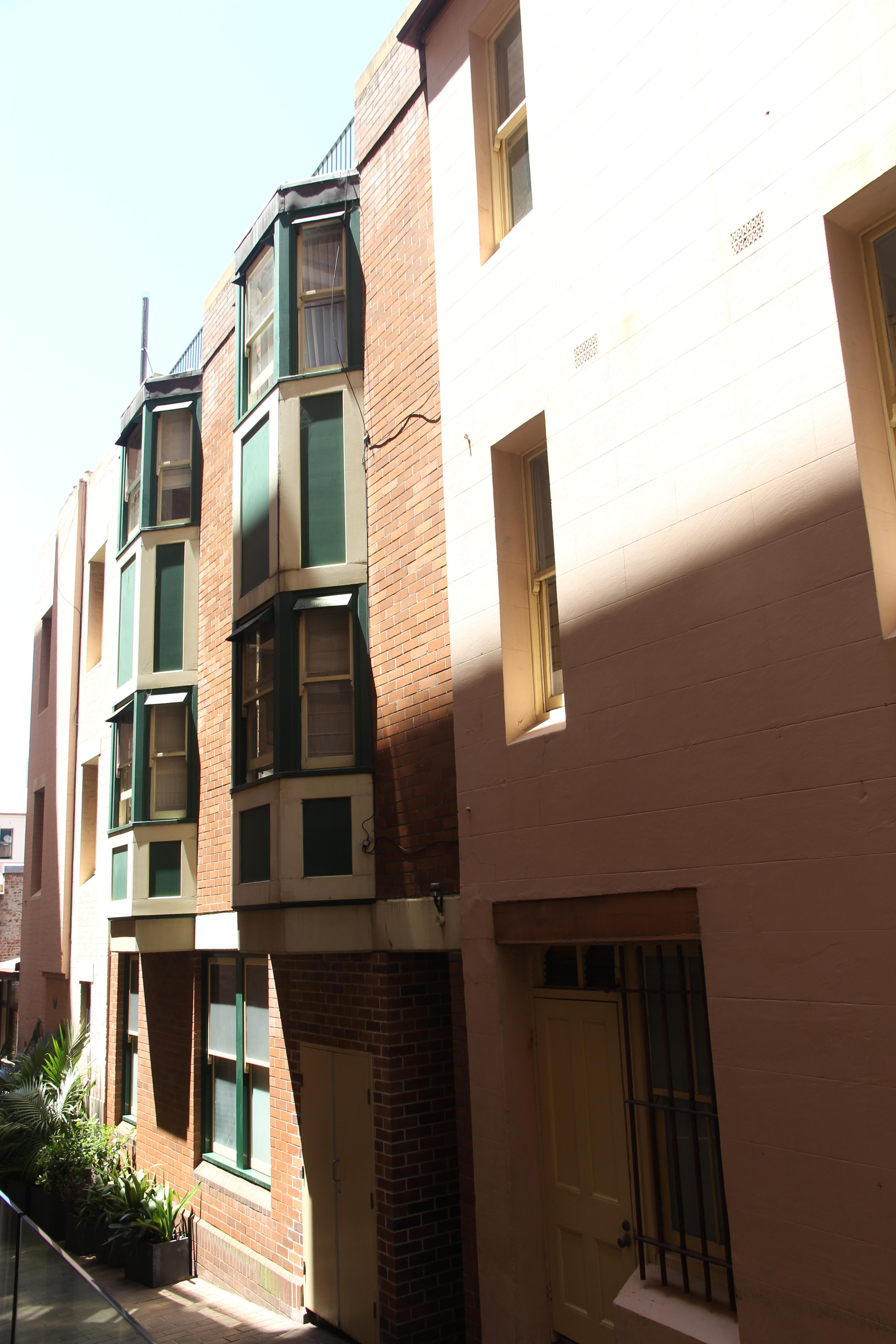
Rear of the former terrace houses located at 139-141 George Street, pictured in 2019. The walkway is The Nurses Walk.

Commencing in the late 1970s and continuing through the 1980s the then Sydney Cove Redevelopment Authority (SCRA) undertook a programme of restoration and reconstruction of the premises at no. 139–141 George Street. These alterations also included the construction of the premises at the rear of 139–141 George Street, known as 30–32 Nurses Walk. Contemporary with the SCRA alterations, further alterations and additions were undertaken over the 1980s. This work was prepared for the proprietors of The Russell Hotel by Ron Vickery architect, and included in 1984 a new development at 30–32 Nurses Walk, which was completed in the mid-1980s and provided the additional rooms and connections with the neighbouring premises under the joint The Russell Hotel lease.

== Description ==
The building is a large three storey building of dressed sandstone in the Classical Revival manner built c. 1890. The upper floor windows have fine detailing in the carved stone surrounds, and the whole building is topped by a high parapet with a large central pediment. The shopfronts have been much altered.

Style: Front facade 'Neo-classical'; Storeys: Three; Facade: Brick walls; Internal Walls: Brick; Roof Cladding: Iron; Floor Frame: Timber

No. 139–141 George Street is a double storey sandstone masonry built commercial premises constructed c. 1882. The premises are currently leased as retain outlets (ground floor - Rockhounds and the Sheepskin Shop) and as hotel accommodation (first and second floors) which is part of The Russell Hotel operation. The rear of the premises is a modern building which adjoins a laneway now known as Nurses Walk.

=== Condition ===
As at 27 April 2001, Archaeology Assessment Condition: Mostly disturbed. Assessment Basis: Cellars under No. 139. Recent renovation. Floors terraced into hill slope. The work involved the assessment of underfloor deposits at this site during renovations. No evidence was found of structures pre-dating 1881, although it should be stressed that not all archaeological deposits were removed from the site. Investigation: Watching Brief.

== Heritage listing ==
As at 31 March 2011, this pair of shops and residences and site are of State heritage significance for their historical and scientific cultural values. The site and building are also of State heritage significance for their contribution to The Rocks area which is of State Heritage significance in its own right.

It is a rare example of a late nineteenth century decorative sandstone façade in the Classical Revival style a set within a streetscape, George Street North, which is the most intact nineteenth and early twentieth century streetscape in the city. The building and site demonstrate longevity of European use that is historically associated with the early colonial development in Sydney in being part of the general hospital site (1788–1816) and part of a stone terrace of three constructed for Samuel Terry (c.1830s). The subsequent use of the site as retail/commercial shops with upper floor boarding rooms is closely associated with the later economic and social development of The Rocks area as a place of residence and travellers. The building is included on key heritage registers maintained by government and community groups and these recognise the heritage values of the item individually and as part of the historic Rocks precinct. The site is also of local heritage significance owing to its potential to reveal evidence of earlier site uses and structures.

Shops and Residences – stone was listed on the New South Wales State Heritage Register on 10 May 2002 having satisfied the following criteria.

The place is important in demonstrating the course, or pattern, of cultural or natural history in New South Wales.

The item meets this criterion at a state level owing to the longevity of European use of the site, which is associated with the early colonial development in Sydney in being part of the general hospital site (1788–1816) and part of a stone terrace of three constructed for Samuel Terry (c. 1830s). The subsequent continuous use of the site as retail/commercial shops with upper floor boarding rooms is closely associated with the later economic and social development of The Rocks area as a place of residence and travellers.

The place has a strong or special association with a person, or group of persons, of importance of cultural or natural history of New South Wales's history.

The site is associated with Samuel Terry and his wife Rosetta. Terry was a successful emancipist merchant, landowner and became known as "The Botany Bay Rothschild". Between 1817 and 1820 he held more than a fifth of the total value of mortgages registered in the colony, a higher proportion than that of the Bank of New South Wales. He was also one of the largest shareholders in the bank, but when he stood for election as director in 1818, 1819 and 1820 he was unsuccessful; when elected in 1822 he was refused his seat on the pretext that, as an expiree, he was not "unconditionally free". When again elected to the board of the Bank of New South Wales in August 1828 by 308 votes to 83 he took office only until December. By that time he had become a leading philanthropist, contributing to the Benevolent Society, Auxiliary Bible Society, Sydney Public Grammar school, and later to Sydney College, on whose committees he served actively. He supported the Wesleyans and became a trustee for them in 1822. In the late 1820s Terry was firmly established as a public figure, though still often censured for his methods and for his material success. He became increasingly identified with the political aspirations of the emancipists and at times their spokesman: for example, as treasurer of the committee formed in 1821 to defend their rights. In 1827, 1830 and 1831 he was a leader in organizing petitions for trial by jury and a house of assembly, and also in expressing patriotic feeling through Australia Day celebrations; he was in the chair at the fortieth anniversary dinner in 1828 and again in 1831 as first president of the "Australian Society for the Promotion of the Growth and Cultivation of Colonial Produce and Manufactures". In 1826 he became president of a Masonic Lodge and was prominent in its activities in the following years of his life. Despite criticisms and snubs he had attained a position of public eminence and often of public responsibility. When Terry died on 22 February 1838, three years after a paralytic seizure, he was buried with Masonic honours and the band of the 50th Regiment led the procession. The funeral, described as the grandest seen in the colony, may be taken as the summation of his life's striving. He left a personal estate of £250,000, an income of over £10,000 a year from Sydney rentals, and landed property that defies assessment. His will was eventually published by the government as a public document. His wife lived until 5 September 1858. The family sold to the government the land now occupied by Martin Place and the General Post Office, Sydney.

The Terrys, Samuel and Rosetta, may be seen in retrospect as two able, single-minded early colonists who resolved to reverse their unfavourable, brutalizing early fortunesand succeeded.

The place is important in demonstrating aesthetic characteristics and/or a high degree of creative or technical achievement in New South Wales.

The item meets this criterion at a state level as an important extant example of a late nineteenth century commercial building in the Classical Revival architectural style with its decorative sandstone façade set within the streetscape of George Street North, which is the most intact nineteenth and early twentieth century streetscape in the city.

The place has a strong or special association with a particular community or cultural group in New South Wales for social, cultural or spiritual reasons.

The item meets this criterion at a state level owing to its inclusion on key heritage registers maintained by government and community groups which recognise the heritage values of the item individually and as part of the historic Rocks precinct.

The place has potential to yield information that will contribute to an understanding of the cultural or natural history of New South Wales.

The item meets this criterion at a local level owing the potential of the site to reveal evidence of earlier site uses and structures.

The place possesses uncommon, rare or endangered aspects of the cultural or natural history of New South Wales.

The item meets this criterion at a local level owing the rarity of the decorative sandstone façade and setting with the heritage streetscape of George Street North.

The place is important in demonstrating the principal characteristics of a class of cultural or natural places/environments in New South Wales.

The item meets this criterion at a local level in being a representative example of a late nineteenth century commercial premises built in the economic boom of the 1880s.

== See also ==
- Australian residential architectural styles
- Fortune of War Hotel
- Rusell Hotel
