= Russell Hotel =

Russell Hotel may refer to:

- Hotel Russell, London hotel
- Russell Hotel (Ottawa), Ottawa hotel
- Russell Hotel, The Rocks, Sydney hotel
- The Russell Hotel, former Dublin hotel
