= Hawthorn East =

- Suburb
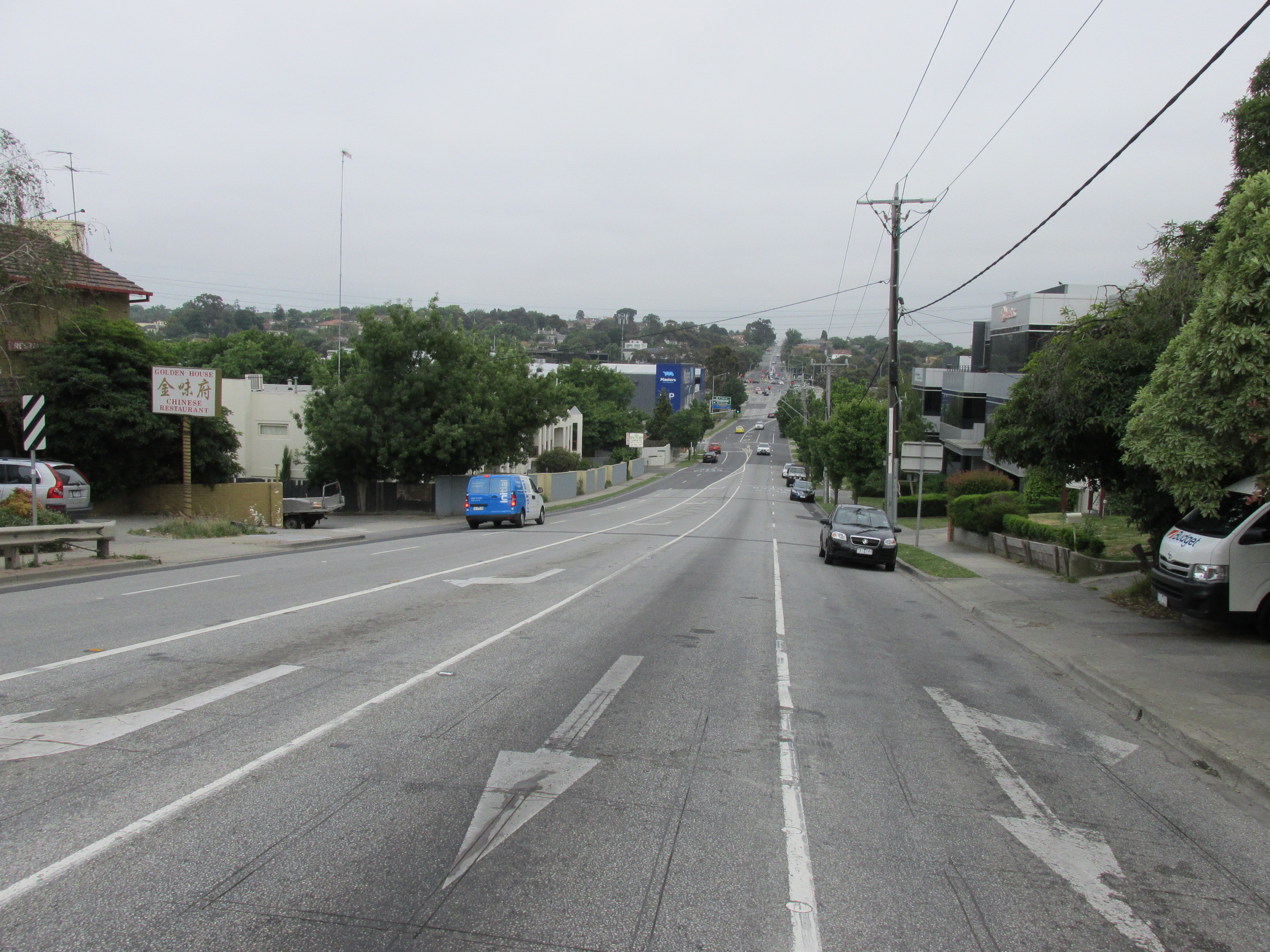
- Toorak Road in Hawthorn East

- Interactive map of Hawthorn East
- Coordinates: 37.831°S 145.050°E
- Country: Australia
- State: Victoria
- City: Melbourne
- LGA: City of Boroondara
- Location: 7 km (4.3 mi) from Melbourne
- Established: 1880s

Government
  - State electorate: Hawthorn
  - Federal division: Kooyong

Area
  - Total: 3.8 km^{2} (1.5 sq mi)
- Elevation: 52 m (171 ft)

Population
  - Total: 14,834 (2021 census)
  - Density: 3,900/km^{2} (10,110/sq mi)
- Postcode: 3123
Suburbs around Hawthorn East
Kew	Kew	Canterbury
Hawthorn	Hawthorn East	Camberwell
Hawthorn	Malvern	Glen Iris

Hawthorn East is a suburb of Melbourne, Victoria, Australia, 7 km (4.3 mi) east of the Melbourne central business district, located within the City of Boroondara local government area. Hawthorn East recorded a population of 14,834 at the 2021 census.

The suburb is roughly bounded by Barkers Road to the north, Burke Road to the east, Toorak Road and the Monash Freeway to the south and Auburn Road to the west.

Coles has its head offices in Hawthorn East.

== History ==
The traditional owners of the area in which Hawthorn East is located are the Wurundjeri People, who lived on the land for at least 14,000 years. The Wurundjeri People are represented by the Wurundjeri Woi Wurrung Cultural Heritage Aboriginal Corporation.

The current suburb of Hawthorn East was established in the 1800s and many of the historical buildings and houses are well-preserved. It is located in the local government area of the City of Boroondara and is between two shopping strips, located on Glenferrie Road and Burke Road.

=== Heritage listings ===
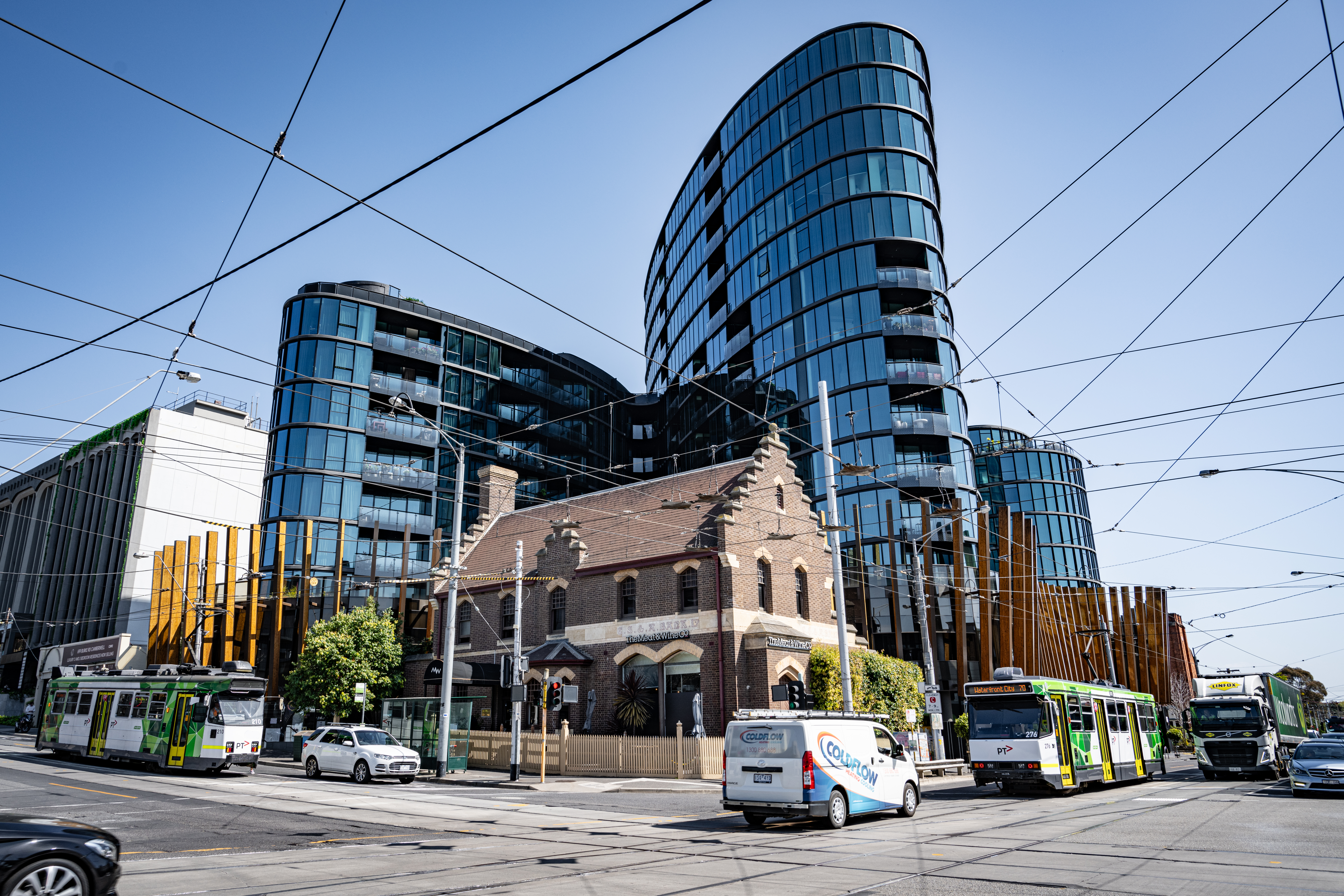
Camberwell Junction, with the former ES&A bank branch dwarfed by a modern apartment complex

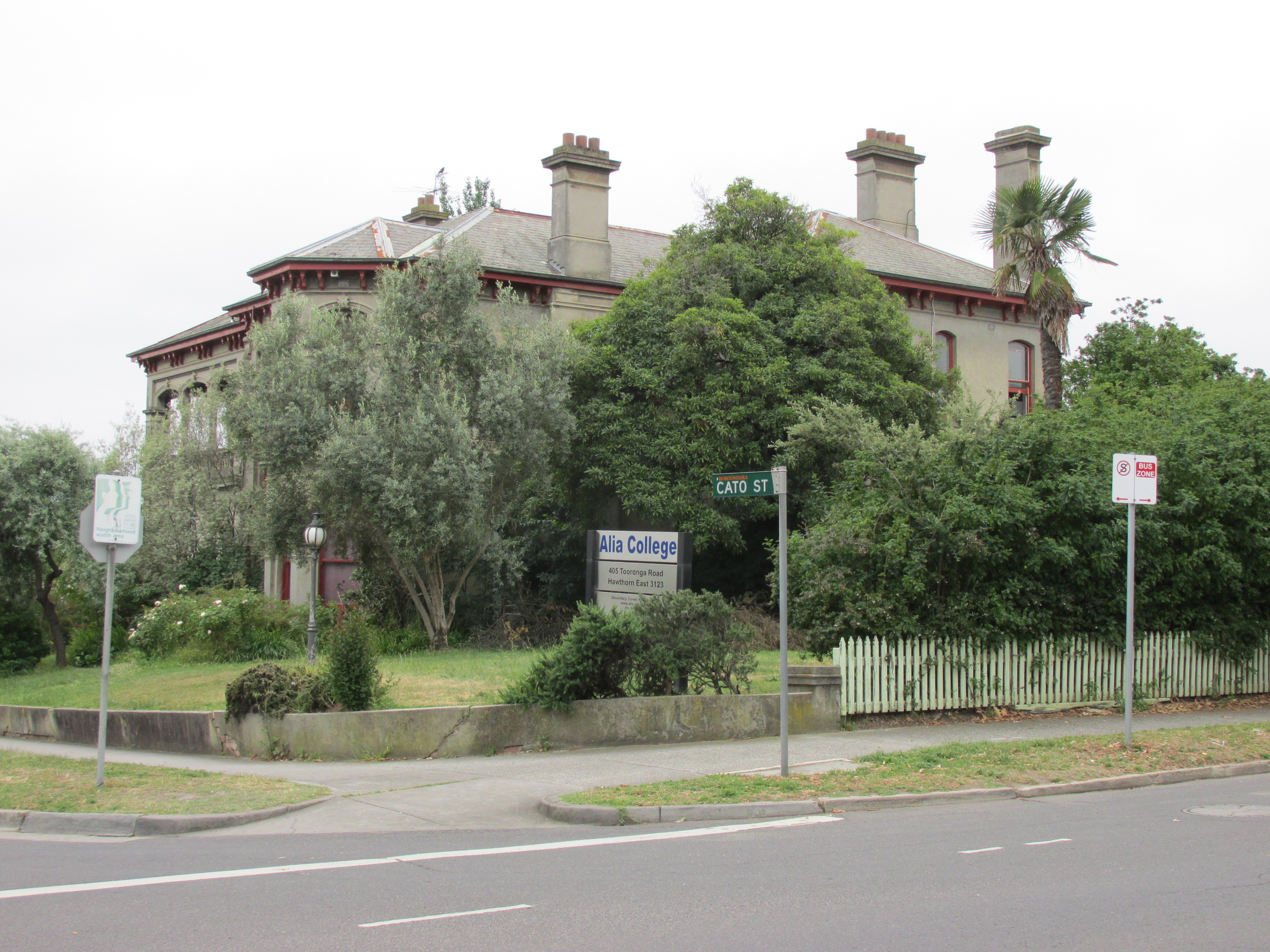
The former Kawarau mansion, that has housed the Alia College since 2014

The following places in Hawthorn East are listed on the Victorian Heritage Register:

- Auburn Primary School, 51 Rathmines Road
- Auburn railway station complex, 99 Auburn Road
- English, Scottish and Australian Bank (former), 482 Riversdale Road
- Kawarau, 405 Tooronga Road, that is Alia College since 2014
- Rivoli Theatre, 200 Camberwell Road
- Rotha, 29 Harcourt Street

== Demographics ==
In the 2016 census, there were 14,321 people in Hawthorn East, 52.3% female and 47.7% male. The median age of the population at this time was 34 years, 4 years below the national median of 38. 63.8% of people were born in Australia. The next most common countries of birth were China 5.2%, India 3.5%, England 3.1%, New Zealand 1.8% and Malaysia 1.6%. 70.0% of people spoke only English at home; the next most common languages were Mandarin 6.5%, Greek 2.2%, Cantonese 1.6%, Italian 1.2% and Hindi 1.2%. The most common responses for religion were No Religion 40.0% and Catholic 19.4%.

In the 2021 census, there were 14,321 people in Hawthorn East, 52.6% female and 47.4% male. The median age of the population at this time was 36 years, 2 years below the national median of 38. 66.1% of people were born in Australia. The next most common countries of birth were China (excludes SARs and Taiwan) 5.5%, India 3.0%, England 2.9%, Malaysia 2.0% and New Zealand 1.7%. 72.5% of people spoke only English at home; the next most common languages were Mandarin 7.2%, Greek 2.0%, Cantonese 1.9%, Italian 1.1% and Hindi 1.0%. The most common responses for religion were No Religion 48.0% and Catholic 17.7%.

== Places of interest ==
Fritsch Holzer Park is a large open space, popular for recreational activities and named after Augustus Fritsch and the Holzer brothers, who formed the Upper Hawthorn Brick Company on this site in 1883. The former Hawthorn Council purchased the site in 1972 and used it as a landfill site until 1986, then a temporary waste transfer station until 1989. In 1995 a project was launched to reconstruct this area into a park. Other significant parks include Anderson Park, that offers panoramic views of the Melbourne city centre; Cato Park, that was part of the Kawarau estate; and the Victoria Road Reserve.

Since 1987, the head office of Coles Group, one of Australia's biggest companies and second-largest supermarket, is located in Hawthorn East, adjacent to Toorak Road, on the site of the former Toorak Drive-In Theatre.

== Education ==
Primary and secondary schools within Hawthorn East include Alia College, Auburn Primary School, Auburn South Primary School, Bialik College and Auburn High School (formerly Hawthorn Secondary College). Auburn Primary School was established in 1889.

== Public transport ==
Hawthorn East is served by the following routes:

=== Tram routes ===
- 70: Waterfront City to Wattle Park
- 72: Camberwell to Melbourne University
- 75: Victoria Harbour to Vermont South

=== Train routes ===
Hawthorn East is serviced by Auburn railway station. Two nearby stations in bordering suburbs include Camberwell and Glenferrie. These stations are situated on the following lines: The Belgrave, Lilydale and Alamein lines. The Glen Waverley line runs past the southern boundary of the suburb and the closest station is Tooronga.

== See also ==
- City of Hawthorn – Hawthorn East was previously within this former local government area.
