= Auburn High School (Victoria) =

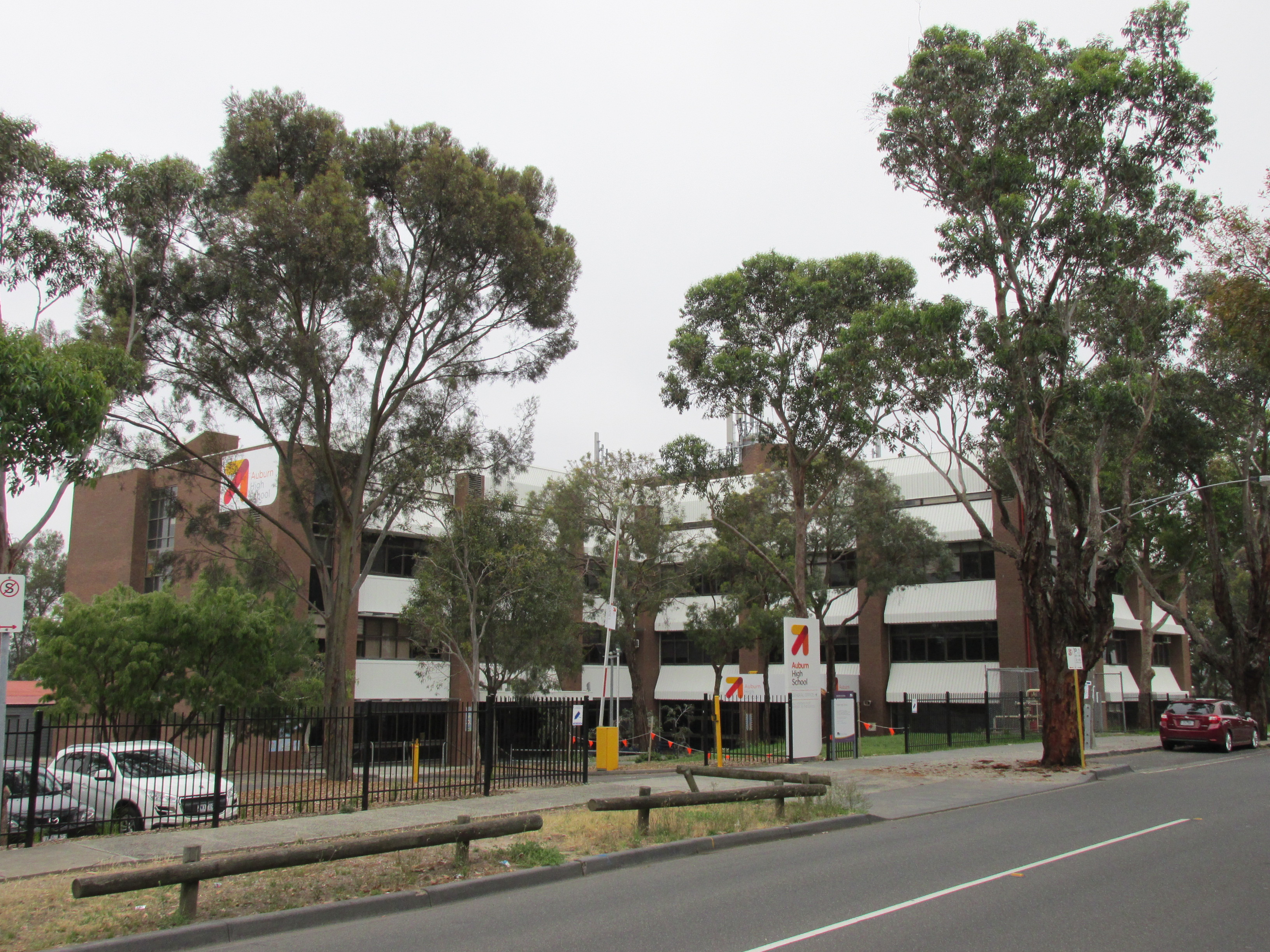
- Auburn High School, pictured in 2014

Location
- Hawthorn East, Melbourne, Victoria; Australia
- 37°50′22″S 145°02′31″E

Information
- Other name: AHS
- Former name: Hawthorn Secondary College
- Type: Public high school
- Motto: Diversity Aspiration Respect Excellence (DARE)
- Established: 2014; 12 years ago (as Auburn High School)
- Principal: Ross Pritchard
- Years: 7–12
- Enrolment: 748
- Houses: Murdoch, Hollows, Freeman, Winston
- Colours: Red, orange, yellow and grey.
- Website: auburnhs.vic.edu.au

Auburn High School is a public co-educational high school located in Hawthorn East, Melbourne, Victoria, Australia, serving Year 7 to Year 12. Formerly known as Hawthorn Secondary College, it was re-established under its current name in January 2014.

Auburn High School is the only Victorian government secondary school to be offering a Binational French program. Students in this program not only learn French, but learn in French according to the French National Curriculum. The Binational French program is a select-entry, internationally recognised program which offers students a dynamic and modern approach to language learning by merging French and Australian pedagogy in classes. The French Binational programme is fully accredited by the AEFE.

Its school zone includes the suburbs of Toorak, Armadale, Malvern, Malvern East, Kooyong, Hawthorn, Hawthorn East, Camberwell and Glen Iris.

Auburn High School is a TAAS accredited SEAL school. The program provides highly capable students with the opportunity to complete years 7–10 in three years instead of four.

They may then be able to choose to do a three-year enriched and extended VCE program and a university enhancement subject in Year 12, equivalent to a first-year university subject.

== History ==
In 1994, the school then known as John Gardiner High School changed its name to Hawthorn Secondary College. Hawthorn Secondary College closed on 31 December 2013 and reopened as Auburn High School.
