= Auburn Primary School =

Heritage-listed primary school in Melbourne, Victoria, Australia

Location
- 51 Rathmines Road, Hawthorn East, City of Boroondara, Melbourne, Victoria; Australia; 37°49′13″S 145°03′01″E

Information
- Type: Public primary school
- Motto: Learn; connect; create
- Established: 8 April 1889; 137 years ago
- Oversight: Victorian Department of Education
- Principal: Allison Blackley
- Grades: Foundation–Year 6
- Enrolment: c. 400
- Website: auburnps.vic.edu.au

Site notes
- Material: Red bricks; Marseilles tile; bluestone; cast iron; timber; leadlight
- Architect: George William Watson
- Architectural style: Victorian

Victorian Heritage Register
- Official name: Auburn Primary School No. 2948
- Type: Registered place
- Designated: 20 August 1982
- Reference no.: H1707
- Heritage overlay no.: HO110
- Category: Education

Register of the National Estate
- Official name: Auburn Primary School
- Type: Defunct register
- Designated: undated
- Reference no.: 101576

The Auburn Primary School is a public primary school located at 51 Rathmines Road in Hawthorn East, in the City of Boroondara, in the inner suburbs of Melbourne, in Victoria, Australia. The school is administered by the Victorian Department of Education, with an enrolment of c. 400 students and a teaching staff of c. 20, as of 2026. The school serves students from Foundation to Year 6.

Built in 1889 on the traditional lands of the Bunurong people, the school was added to the Victorian Heritage Register on 20 August 1982 in recognition of its social, historical, and architectural significance; and was also added to the non-statutory and now defunct Register of the National Estate on an unknown date.

== History ==
The establishment of a primary school in Auburn was the result of much lobbying on behalf of the families of the fast-growing Auburn district. Temporary accommodation was opened in April 1889 and in October 1890 Auburn Primary school No. 2948 was opened. Additions were made to the school in 1901. Politician and local resident George Swinburne lobbied the Education Department for the construction of a separate infant building which was built in 1913.

== Description ==
The main school is an asymmetrical polychrome brick building featuring elaborate traceried gables on the front and side facades. It has a conical tower over its portico entry. The interior retains its original bluestone staircase and cast iron balustrading. Four of the upstairs classrooms retain their coved ceilings and square decorative ceiling vents. The infant school is constructed in red brick with a Marseilles tile roof. It has a central hall with surrounding classrooms and entry lobby. The hall has a polished timber hammerbeam ceiling and contains leadlight windows featuring Australian birds. The grounds also include a small hexagonal shelter shed of horizontal weatherboard with lattice work above c. 1910 and two rectangular timber shelter sheds c. 1920 – c. 1930.

The designer of most of the infants school in Victoria of that era was George William Watson (1850-1915), who was born and educated in England. He entered the Public Works Department soon after his arrival in Victoria in October 1872. He designed and carried out many large and important buildings and was promoted to chief architect of the Department in 1910.

=== Main windows ===
The main windows in the assembly hall at Auburn depicted a pastoral scene over four panels separated by timber mullions with sheep grazing around the edge of a road, and farmhouses in right and left panels. Along the top of the window were depictions of a parrot, magpie, kookaburra and rosella. Pairs of leadlight windows on the external wall of the assembly hall also have an Australian motif with rosellas and stylised gum trees. It is possible that the designs of these windows may have been executed by the prominent landscape and leadlight artist William (Jock) Frater, who worked for the Melbourne firm E. L. Yencken and Co. from 1914 to 1940.

== See also ==
- Architecture of Melbourne
- Education in Victoria
- List of government schools in Victoria, Australia
- List of places on the Victorian Heritage Register in the City of Boroondara
