= Kawarau =

Heritage-listed house in Melbourne, Victoria, Australia

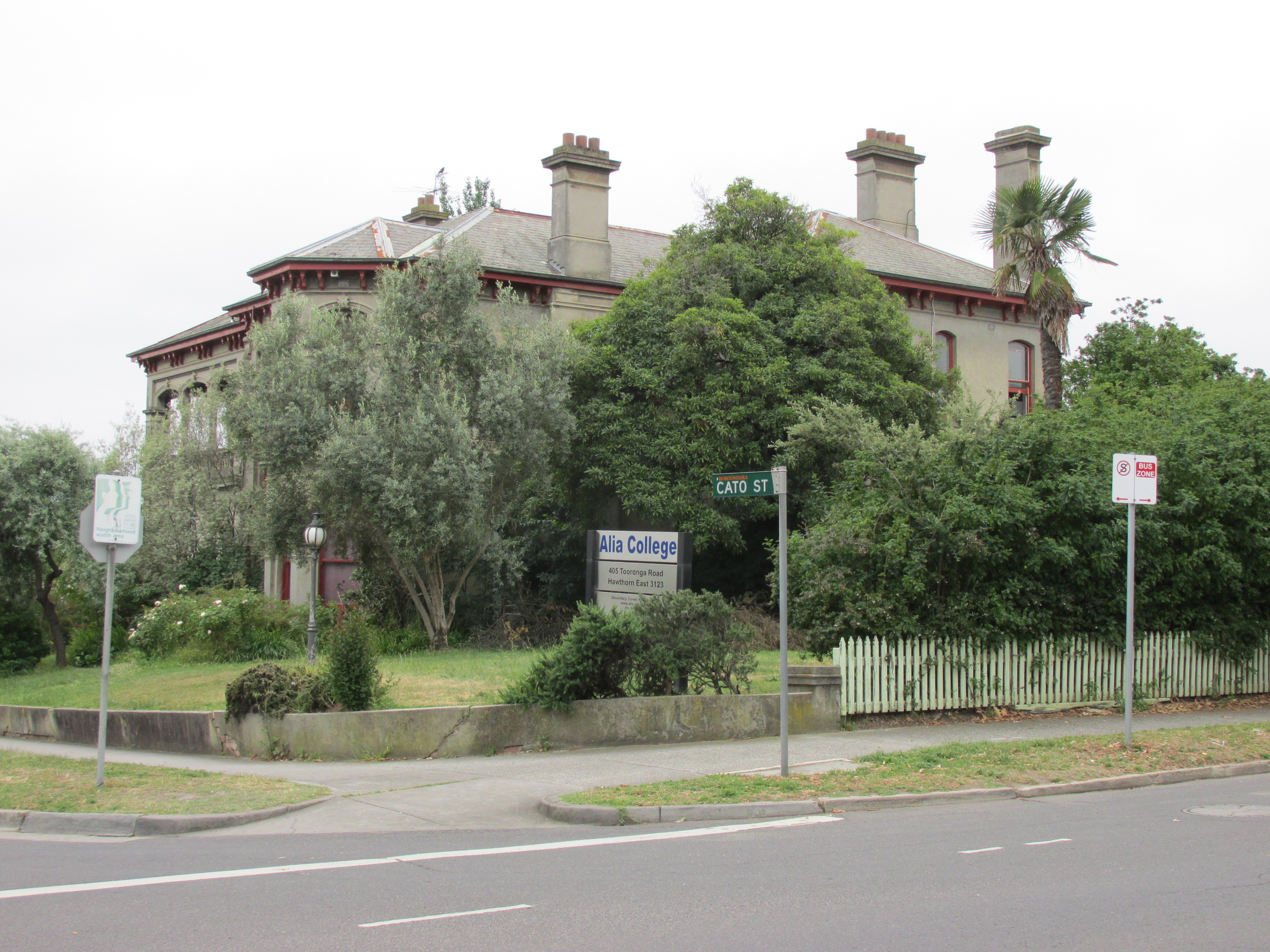
- The former mansion in 2014, after being repurposed as a school

- Location of the house in Greater Metropolitan Melbourne
- Former names: Warrington
- Etymology: Kawarau River (Note: Frances Cato was born in the South Island of New Zealand, where the Kawarau River flows. There she met Frederick Cato; and it is most-likely that they renamed the house from Warrington to Kawarau in c. 1896.)

General information
- Status: Completed
- Type: Mansion (1893–2014); School building (since 2014)
- Architectural style: Victorian Italianate
- Location: 405 Tooronga Road, Hawthorn East, City of Boroondara, Melbourne, Victoria, Australia
- Coordinates: 37°50′35″S 145°02′42″E
- Completed: 1893; 133 years ago
- Renovated: 1904
- Client: Robert Robinson
- Owner: Robert Robinson (1893–1896); Frederick and Frances Cato (1896–1948); Stephanie Alexander (1989–2014); Alia College (since 2014)

Technical details
- Material: Stuccoed bricks; slate; timber
- Grounds: 3 ha (8 acres) (1893); 1,753 m^{2} (18,870 sq ft) (2026)

Design and construction
- Architect: Francis Coote (attrib.)
- Architecture firm: Beswicke and Coote

Renovating team
- Architects: Ussher and Kemp (1904)

Victorian Heritage Register
- Official name: Kawarau
- Type: Registered place
- Designated: 4 March 1981
- Reference no.: VHR H0489
- Heritage overlay no.: HO130
- Category: Residential buildings (private)

Register of the National Estate
- Official name: Kawarau
- Type: Defunct register
- Designated: 21 March 1978
- Reference no.: 5667

Kawarau is a former mansion, now school building, located at 405 Tooronga Road in Hawthorn East, in the City of Boroondara, in the inner eastern suburbs of Melbourne, in Victoria, Australia.

Built in 1893 on the traditional lands of the Wurundjeri people, the house was added to the Victorian Heritage Register on 4 March 1981 in recognition of its historical and architectural significance; and was also added to non-statutory lists by the Victorian branch of the National Trust on 14 September 1972 and the now defunct Register of the National Estate on 21 March 1978.

== History ==
Kawarau is a Victorian Italianate mansion originally known as Warrington, with a nineteenth-century bi-chrome outbuilding. Set on three hectares (eight acres), the expansive twenty-roomed residence was built for Robert Robinson, a Melbourne grain merchant, and completed in 1893 at the time of the bank crash and economic depression. The design of the original house has been attributed to Francis Coote, of the architectural practice Beswicke and Coote.

By 1896, Frances (Fanny) and Frederick Cato, of the retailing firm Moran and Cato, were residing in the house, seeking hired help for their family, and witnessed the death of three of their children at the house. In 1904, the Cato family commissioned the architectural firm Ussher and Kemp to undertake extensions, including a billiard room. The Cato family temporarily relocated to England from 1907. During their absence, the house was occupied by Reverend G. Schofield, Fanny Cato's brother; and the Cato family returned to Australia by 1912 where they often entertained at their home. Frederick Cato, a lay member of the Methodist community and notable philanthropist who gifted c.A£250,000 whilst living, died at Kawarau in 1935, with his estate valued at A£591,176. Cato provided for his family and a range of charitable causes including the Methodist Ladies' College, where, in 1937, a school house was named in his honour; and Cato College, that now forms part of the Elsternwick campus of Wesley College, in Melbourne. Frances Cato died at Kawarau in 1948.

Stephanie Alexander AO, a restauranteur, chef, food educator and author, owned the house between 1989 and 2014, where she established her signature restaurant in the house in 1980.

The former mansion was repurposed in 2014 as an independent alternative school, called Alia College.

== Description ==
The two-storey house is constructed of stuccoed brick with a slate roof and is symmetrically planned with a double-storey arcade supported by Corinthian columns. The interior is a mixture of Victorian and Edwardian styles. The 1904 billiard room contains deep fibrous plaster frieze of Art Nouveau ornamentation with a ceiling of red pine divided into an octagonal pattern.

Kawarau is a representative example of a large Melbourne land boom-era house and is of note architecturally for both its planning and detailing. The location of the stairwall to form part of the main facade is uncommon and this wall is elaborately detailed with festooned consoles and brackets. The squat engaged columns facing the north-west bay window are an unusual detail. The groups of timber eaves brackets, the stained glass and the combination of segmental and round arches in the arcade are all distinctive.

== See also ==
- Architecture of Melbourne
- List of places on the Victorian Heritage Register in the City of Boroondara
