= Bible Society NSW =

Bible Society NSW was the first Australian Bible society, formed through an Act of the Parliament of New South Wales in 1817 and was known as the NSW auxiliary of the British and Foreign Bible Society (founded in London 1804). The Society's charter was signed by Governor Lachlan Macquarie. The formal establishment of Bible Society Auxiliaries in each colony occurred between 1817 and 1884.

In 2010, the Bible Societies of Australia in each state merged into a single organisation, Bible Society Australia.
