= Russell Hotel, The Rocks =

Russell Hotel
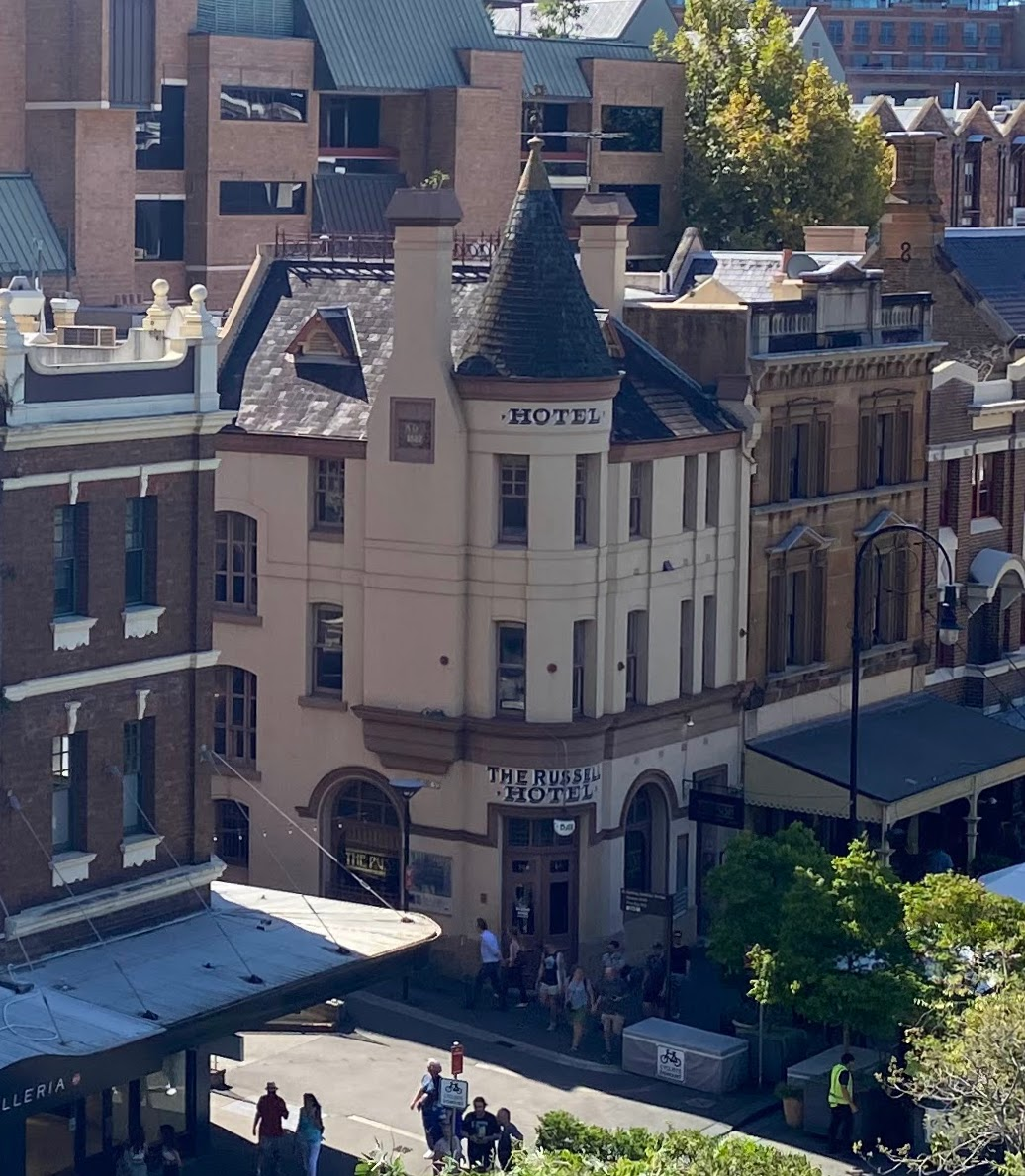
- Russell Hotel in 2023, seen from Cahill Walk

- Location within Sydney Location within Australia
- 33.8604°S 151.2083°E
- Location: 143 George Street, The Rocks, New South Wales, Australia

History
- Built: 1887
- Built for: Thomas Brennan

Site notes
- Architectural style: Queen Anne
- Owner: Property NSW

New South Wales Heritage Register
- Official name: Russell Hotel and shop; Port Jackson Hotel; Russell Private Hotel
- Type: State heritage (built)
- Designated: 10 May 2002
- Reference no.: 1575
- Type: Hotel
- Category: Commercial

The Russell Hotel is a heritage-listed hotel located at 143 George Street, in the inner city Sydney suburb of The Rocks, Australia. It was built in 1887. It operated as the Port Jackson Hotel until being delicensed in 1923, after which time a new Port Jackson Hotel was built further along George Street. In 1933, it became the Russell Private Hotel, providing accommodation from the upper floors. The ground floor has been leased for various uses since the original delicensing, initially as a cafe for several decades and most recently as a restaurant and bar. It is owned by Property NSW.

== History ==
In the area of The Russell Hotel was the convict's hospital, opened in 1788 under the care of surgeon John White. The hospital cared for the hundreds of sick convicts; five hundred alone arriving with the Second Fleet. From 1790 a portable hospital building, shipped out from England with the Second Fleet, was used. The colony's sole hospital continued to be located in this area until the Rum hospital situated on Macquarie Street was completed in 1816. The vacant land was set aside as a government quarry to extract the sandstone to build Governor Macquarie's Sydney. The site of the quarry is shown in a plan of Sydney dated August 1822.

This particular part of the hospital site was classified in the general surveys of the town undertaken in the early 1830s, to formalise land boundaries and entitlements, as Lot 7 of City Section 84 which comprised an area of 1 rood 15 perches.

=== Ownership by Samuel Terry and family ===
In January 1841 this allotment was officially granted to the trustees, executrix and executors of the estate of the emancipist Samuel Terry, these being Rosetta Terry (widow), John Terry Hughes (nephew and son-in-law), Tom White Melville Winder of Windermere, Maitland (family friend and long-standing business acquaintance) and James Norton (solicitor). Samuel Terry's interest in this town allotment however seems to date from at least around 1823 when an area of "26 rods" situated on the "west side George Street" with a description which approximates that of the George Street half of Lot 7 of City Section 84 was leased to Terry for the term of 21 years.

Terry (1776–1838), publican, merchant and landowner has been described as the "Botany Bay Rothschild". He arrived in Sydney in 1801 convicted of theft with a sentence of seven years' transportation. By the time of the expiration of his sentence he was established as a merchant in Parramatta, and in 1809 was the owner of a farm on the Hawkesbury River. In 1810 he moved to Sydney and opened a public house in Pitt Street and married Rosetta Marsh, a woman of considerable business acumen. During Governor Macquarie's administration the Terrys' business interests prospered to where "he held more than a fifth of the total value of mortgages registered in the colony." At the time of his death in 1838 he left a personal estate of £250,000, an annual rental income from his Sydney properties of £10,000 and "land property which defies assessment." Terry's business interests included brewing and he was also occasionally a publican.

In regard to the site of the Russell Hotel, Terry undertook the construction of a terrace of three buildings (today's 139–143 George Street) on the George Street half of the allotment. This was evidently completed in the mid to late 1820s for it is plotted on Hoddle, Larmer and Mitchell's "Map of Town of Sydney" of 1831. The footprint of this building, in a terrace of three with a breakfront, is clearly defined in Robert Russell's later survey of 1834, while the few available images of the building suggest a substantial structure of three storeys with the prominent breakfront capped by a closed pediment.

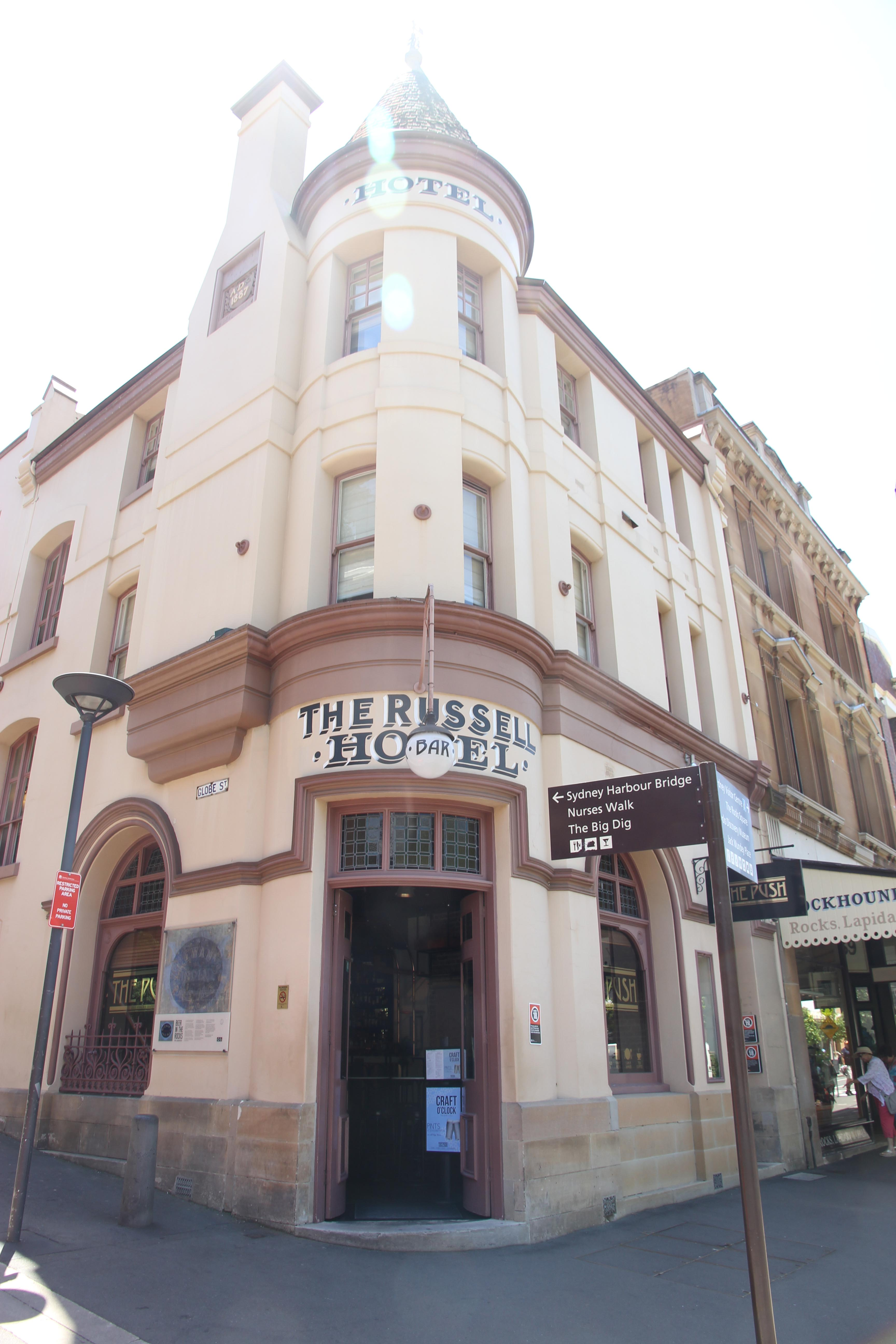
Located on the corner of George Street, in The Rocks.

The building may have been part of the neighbouring premises (present day address of 139-141 George Street) as the Robert Russell survey implies or alternatively the premises may have been used, perhaps intermittently, as a public hotel, given Terry's brewing interests. From the mid 1840s tenants of the premises are listed in street directories and council rate assessments; the first entry is for the year 1845 when a Henry Day traded from premises with a street address of no. 661 Lower George Street, but from June 1845 the premises were a licensed public house leased by Isaac Moore and known as the Patent Slip Tavern. G. M. Dow in her biography of Samuel Terry mentions that an earlier name for the Patent Slip was the Sheer Hulk for which there is no licensed publican's record. The trading sign Patent Slip evidently refers to the longstanding government dock sited to the north of the Commissariat Store and demonstrates an affiliation with the maritime activities of the port. The tavern was one of a considerable number trading in Sydney's portside areas of The Rocks and neighbouring Millers Point over the nineteenth century.

Isaac Moore, perhaps was all too aware of the potential business benefits derived from the discovery of gold, for in July 1851 he entered into a lease with Rosetta Terry of "no. 661 (George Street) used as a Public House known by the sign of the Patent Slip" for a period of five years at an annual rental of £65. This lease was renewed in February 1856 (with a commencement date of 5 August 1856) for a further period of five years at an increased annual rental of £100, reflecting the marked increase in property values experienced in the early years of the gold rush. During this latter phase Moore ceased to manage the hotel, preferring to sublet to William McMillan (c. 1855-1858) and later John Gallagher (1859-1868). Moore later kept the Customs House Hotel at the corner of Argyle and Harrington streets, while his family are reputed to have owned the Clontarf picnic grounds at Middle Harbour.

The site of the Russell Hotel was held by Samuel Terry's widow and principal trustee, Rosetta, until her death in 1858. For a short period after this her real property was controlled by Mrs Rebecca Fox until June 1860 when the estate was partitioned. The beneficiaries of this part of the estate were Henry Hill Osborne, Patrick Hill Osborne, Alick Osborne, and Benjamin Marshall Osborne all of Marshall Mount in the Illawarra. Shortly after this, in June 1861, the property was purchased by William Reilly for £1,600/26/0. Reilly retained ownership until 1880. Reilly continued to license the tavern, but also rebuilt the terrace of residential properties fronting Globe Street situated to the rear of the hotel. In the rebuilding, which appears to have been undertaken between 1863 and 1865, Reilly demolished a terrace of single storey weatherboard houses (which seem to have been constructed in the early 1830s) and replaced them with a double storey terrace of three stone built houses. It is highly probable that these houses were designed by architect David McBeath and constructed from September 1864. The impetus for the rebuilding was probably the emerging market for rental properties in the city for the working classes employed in the local industrial and shipping businesses. The tavern continued to be managed by John Gallagher until his death in 1868 and then by his widow, Margaret, in 1869. Over the 1870s the licensee was Martin Heany (1870-1877) and then John Hoskins (c. 1879).

=== Acquisition by Thomas Brennan ===
In August 1880, the property was purchased by Thomas Brennan (d. 1894), initially of Oberon, and later of Summer Hill, Sydney for £3,300. Brennan built the extant hotel in 1887 (dated by keystone on building), but initially continued to lease the old premises under an arrangement he entered into in April 1882 with George Henry Levett and Norman John Croker, general agents, to the following publicans:

- 1880 – Samuel Davis or John Hosking or Dane
- c. 1882 – James Morgan
- 1882–1885 – John M. Jacobson
- 1886–1887 – Henry Deeble

In March 1887, Brennan mortgaged the property, possibly to finance the construction of the extant hotel; and in November of the same year he entered into a lease agreement with Henry Burrows and Hampton Carroll Gleeson for the presumably recently completed hotel which then became known as the Port Jackson Hotel. Unfortunately research has failed to identify the architect. The hotel was completed in time for the centenary of European settlement in Australia. Burrows and Gleeson were the owners of the former Waverley Brewery near present day Bondi Junction. The brewery had opened in 1874 as the Adelaide Brewery. Shortly after the completion of the new Port Jackson Hotel (The Russell Hotel), in 1888 Burrows and Gleeson entered into partnership with Allt & Co., wine and spirit merchants, and the Surrey Brewery in Waterloo to form Allt's Brewery & Wine & Spirit Co. Ltd. Each partner agreed not to be connected with any other brewery or wine and spirit business in Sydney or elsewhere for a period of ten years. The brewing operations of the Surrey Brewery were closed and brewing was concentrated at the Waverley Brewery. Unfortunately, the optimism of the 1880s vanished with the onset of the depression of the 1890s and with it the fortunes of Allt's Brewery & Wine & Spirit Co. Ltd., which went into liquidation in 1895. In this context, it is probable the Port Jackson Hotel was an outlet for the Waverley Brewery and Allt's wines and spirits.

Prior to the collapse of the holding company the Port Jackson Hotel was managed on behalf of the company by the following publicans:

- 1887–1889 – Harry Deeble
- 1890 – John Walker
- 1891 – William Selff
- 1892 – Charles Prince
- 1893 – W. L. Howarth
- 1894 – Patrick Lancer
- 1895 – George Craig
- 1896 – W. Russell

The owner of the hotel, Brennan died at his home, Cattai Villa, Old Canterbury, Road, Summer Hill in June 1894. In the following October, Alfred James Powell, postal officer of Goulburn, and Thomas Read, solicitor of Sydney, acquired the property title. Their ownership was relatively short lived, and may, therefore, have been bequeathed the property by Brennan, for in May 1896 the property was sold to Tooth & Co. In September 1896, Tooth & Co. entered into a long term lease of the hotel with Michael Norris. Norris and his associates continued to manage the hotel until 1911.

=== Resumption by the NSW Government ===
The bubonic plague broke out in Sydney in January 1900. Government authorities had done little to stem the potential for outbreak, but the general panic of the early part of 1900 prompted effective and expensive responses in the form of cleansing, rat catching, enforced quarantine and ultimately resumption of private property including all of The Rocks area. The Rocks was initially under the administration of The Rocks Resumption Board aside from the foreshore areas and later the Sydney Harbour Trust and its successor the Maritime Services Board through to the 1970s.

The history of the Russell Hotel (Port Jackson) for the early decades of the twentieth century is representative of the broader changes taking place in The Rocks with the commercial licensed operation continuing until 1923 under Tooth & Co's lease from the government (head leases were taken out in October 1900, February 1914 and November 1918) and managed by the following publicans:

- 1912–1916 – Mark Lapin
- 1917–1921 – Mrs Josephine Dunn
- 1922 – Edward Claire
- 1923 – William D. Cordingley

The attached residences fronting Globe Street however were demolished probably around 1902 at which time rate assessments for the dwellings ceased and the area was rated as part of 143 George Street, although the extant building in this area was constructed 1913. This work was overseen by the architect for the Housing Board, William H. Foggitt.

The major change came in the 1920s when the licence of the Port Jackson Hotel was withdrawn by the Licences Reduction Board around 1923. This board was established under the Liquor (Amendment) Act 1919 (effective from January 1920) with the role of reducing the number of publicans' licences in New South Wales, determining which premises should be delicensed, and assessing the amount of compensation payable. The establishment of the board reflects broad community support for the temperance movement in the early decades of the last century. Another consequence was the implementation of early closing at 6 p.m. which been had been introduced as a temporary measure in 1916. Tooth & Co was awarded £970 compensation for revocation of the licence and the publican received £330. A new Port Jackson Hotel was subsequently built by Tooth & Co further south on George Street.

=== Delicensing and subsequent use ===
The premises of the delicensed Port Jackson Hotel were converted to a cafe; type use by 1927 operated a commercial lease from the Sydney Harbour Trust. In the early years of the cafe's operation, the lease changed hands regularly until 1932 when Emmanuel Sarandidis took on the business trading as the Colonial Café. Prior to this, the cafe would seem to have traded as Whitworth's Cafe. In the post Second World War era the cafe traded as the Singapore Cafe (1947/50) and Allen's Cafe (1970).

From 1933 the upper floors of the building have been used to provide hotel accommodation. Trading as the Russell Private Hotel, the address of these premises was 143 George Street. The origin of the name, Russell, has not been determined and it may only be coincidental that the last licensed publican of the Port Jackson prior to its acquisition by Tooth & Co. in 1896 was W. Russell. The use of the upper floors as a private hotel has continued to the present.

In 1981 the lease was transferred to the Russell Hotel Pty Ltd with Victoria Alexander as its Designer and Director. Alexander undertook an extensive refurbishment of the premises and reopened as Sydney's first boutique small hotel. The company sold its interest to a consortium in 1985. The intention of this consortium (Russell Hotel Pty Ltd) from the outset was to combine the operations of the Russell Hotel and the Fortune of War Hotel. This was achieved in 1987.

The ground floor (former cafe) section of the property was tenanted through the 1980s by the Japanese Bookshop, and (from c. 1985) a Japanese delicatessen at the rear on the corner of Globe Street and Nurses Walk. This lease expired in 1991. After this time the ground floor was reconverted back to a cafe type use, initially operated by the proprietors of The Russell Hotel and traded as the Russell Tea Room, and then, from 1992, under sub-lease by Boulders Pty. Ltd. The ground floor was operating as the Acacia Restaurant in 2009. In 2021, the ground floor operates as a bar and restaurant, The Push, while the private hotel continues to provide accommodation.

== Description ==
The building is situated on a corner and built on exposed rock face sandstone footings. The remainder of the external walls are rendered masonry, with decorative string courses and other mouldings. The building is a strong corner element in the streetscape with a distinct and picturesque conical roof to the curved corner form. Timber doors and windows (double hung) appear original, but may include some recreated elements, and are in good condition. The chimney is a secondary corner feature, with decorative features, and set back slightly from the corner. Internally, the building retains original layout, and features including joinery, leadlight, floor boards, timber ceilings, and timber stair leading to upper level. The upper levels appear to be the original hotel room layout, with intact associated features including joinery, doors and fireplace.

== Heritage listing ==
The Russell Hotel is of state heritage significance for its aesthetic, historical and scientific cultural values. It is a unique example of a late nineteenth century Queen Anne style licensed hotel quaintly set within the historic harbourside area of Sydney that embodies the key characteristics of its architectural style owing to the integrity of the exterior and interior which retain significant original features and much of the original layout. The building and site demonstrate longevity of European use that is historically associated with the early colonial development in Sydney in being part of the general hospital site (c. 1790–c. 1810s) and part of a stone terrace of three constructed for Samuel Terry (c. 1830s). The subsequent continuous use of the site as a public house/hotel is closely associated with the later economic and social development of The Rocks area. The building is included on key heritage registers maintained by government and community groups and these recognise the heritage values of the item individually and as part of the historic Rocks precinct. Its contemporary hotel use is likely to be recognised by visitors and locals alike owing to its prominent location in a well-frequented tourist destination and characteristic "heritage" presentation inclusive of the picturesque tower that is a local landmark and boldly marks the corner of George and Globe Streets and the entry into the George Street commercial and now principally tourist orientated strip of The Rocks.

Russell Hotel was listed on the New South Wales State Heritage Register on 10 May 2002 having satisfied the following criteria.

The place is important in demonstrating the course, or pattern, of cultural or natural history in New South Wales.

The item meets this criterion at a state level owing to the longevity of European use of the site, which is associated with the early colonial development in Sydney in being part of the general hospital site (c. 1790-c. 1810s) and part of a stone terrace of three constructed for Samuel Terry (c. 1830s). The subsequent continuous use of the site as a public house/ hotel is closely associated with the later economic and social development of The Rocks area as a place of residence and travellers.

The place has a strong or special association with a person, or group of persons, of importance of cultural or natural history of New South Wales's history.

The site was once owned by Samuel Terry, "The Botany Bay Rothschild".

The place is important in demonstrating aesthetic characteristics and/or a high degree of creative or technical achievement in New South Wales.

The item meets this criterion at a state level as an important extant example of a late nineteenth hotel premises in the Queen Anne architectural style. The picturesque tower sited above West Circular Quay is a local landmark and boldly marks the corner of George and Globe Streets and the entry into the George Street commercial strip of The Rocks. Albeit reconstructed in part in the 1980s, the item meets this criterion at a state level owing to the integrity of the exterior and interior which retain significant original features and much of the original layout.

The place has a strong or special association with a particular community or cultural group in New South Wales for social, cultural or spiritual reasons.

The item meets this criterion at a state level owing to its inclusion on key heritage registers maintained by government and community groups which recognise the heritage values of the item individually and as part of the historic Rocks precinct. Its contemporary hotel use is likely to be recognised by visitors and locals alike owing to its prominent location in a well-frequented tourist destination and characteristic "heritage" presentation.

The place has potential to yield information that will contribute to an understanding of the cultural or natural history of New South Wales.

The item meets this criterion at a state level owing to rarity of type and integrity which has potential to reveal new information about the building and its stylistic attributes. The item meets this criterion at a local level owing the potential of the site to reveal evidence of earlier site uses and structures.

The place possesses uncommon, rare or endangered aspects of the cultural or natural history of New South Wales.

The item meets this criterion at a state level as a unique example of a late nineteenth century Queen Anne style licensed hotel quaintly set within the historic harbourside area of Sydney that embodies the key characteristics of its architectural style.

The place is important in demonstrating the principal characteristics of a class of cultural or natural places/environments in New South Wales.

The item meets this criterion at a state level as a representative example of a small nineteenth century former licensed hotel erected in the economic boom of the 1880s.

== See also ==
- Australian non-residential architectural styles
