= Stephanie Alexander =

Australian cook, restaurateur and food writer

Stephanie Alexander AO
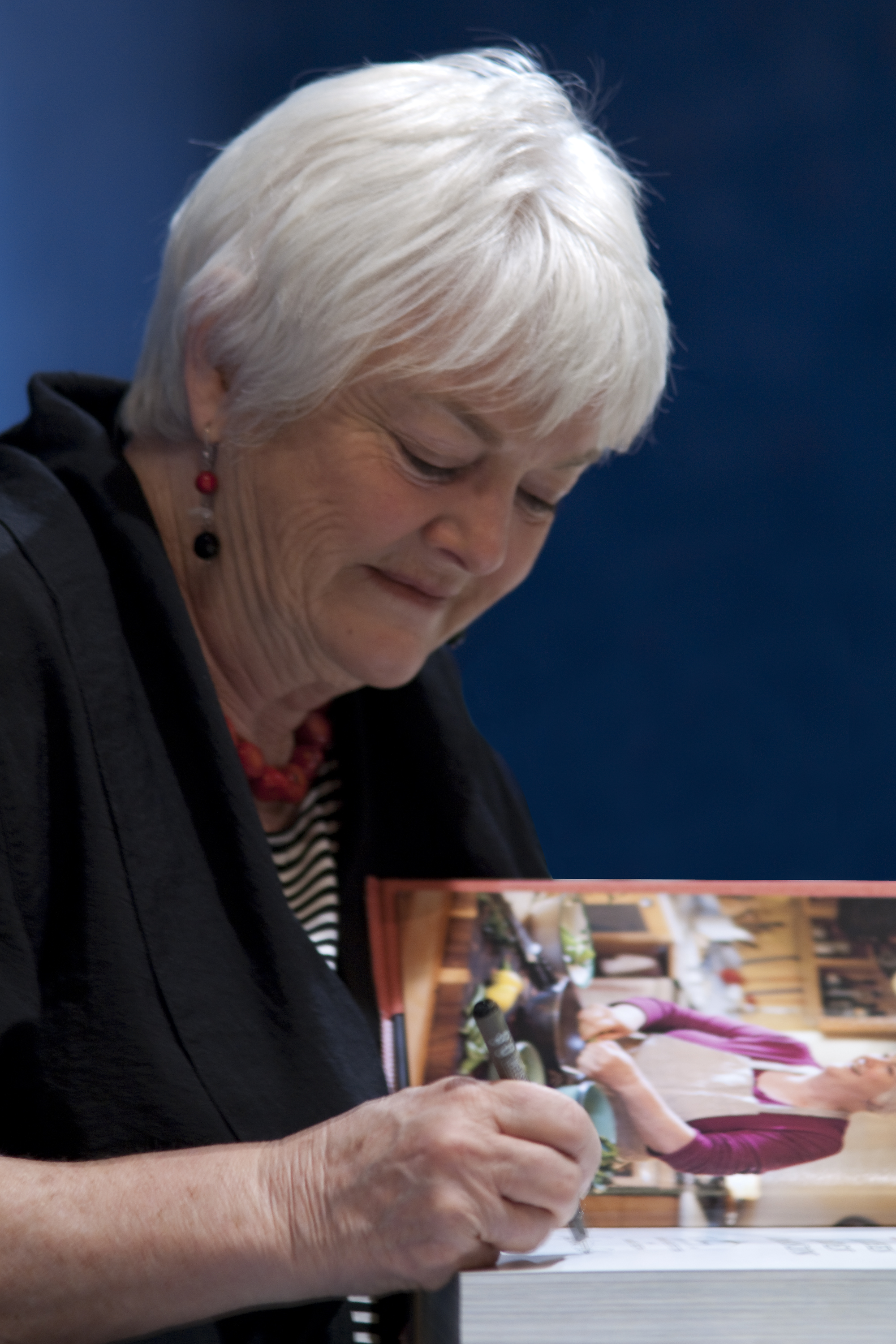
- Alexander signing one of her books in Adelaide, South Australia
- Born: 13 November 1940 (age 86)
- Occupations: Cook, restaurateur, food educator, author
- Children: 2
- Relatives: Wilfred Burchett (uncle)
- Writing career
- Genre: Cooking
- Notable work: The Cook's Companion
- Website: stephaniealexander.com.au

Stephanie Ann Alexander AO (born 13 November 1940) is an Australian cook, restaurateur and food writer.

== Career ==
After studying to become a librarian and travelling the world at the age of 21, Alexander's first restaurant, Jamaica House, opened in 1964. In 1976, her next venture was Stephanie's Restaurant, located in the Melbourne suburb of Fitzroy before moving her signature restaurant, in 1980, to Kawarau, a former Italianate-styled mansion and her home, located in Hawthorn. Stephanie's Restaurant closed in 1997 after operating for 21 years. She went on to publish several cookbooks, including her alphabetical guide to ingredients and cooking, The Cook's Companion.

=== Kitchen Garden Foundation ===
In 2001 Stephanie piloted the Stephanie Alexander Kitchen Garden Program at Collingwood College in Melbourne. The program grew out of Alexander's belief that children learn about food early in life through example and positive experiences, which continues to influence their food choices through life.

In February 2004 the Stephanie Alexander Kitchen Garden Foundation was established. This not-for-profit organisation provides the inspiration, information, professional development and support for educators to deliver pleasurable food education to children and young people. As of June 2023, the Foundation is working with more than 1000 schools and early childhood services around Australia, and this number is growing.

The Foundation engages with schools, governments, philanthropists and passionate individual donors to secure ongoing funding.

== Honours ==
On 26 January 1994, Alexander was awarded the Medal of the Order of Australia in recognition of services to the hospitality and the tourist industry and to the encouragement of apprentices. On 1 January 2001, she was awarded the Centenary Medal for outstanding service to the food and wine industry in Victoria. On 26 January 2014, she was appointed an Officer of the Order of Australia for distinguished service to education through the design and establishment of schools-based learning programs promoting improved food and eating choices for children, and as an author.

== Personal life ==
Alexander's parents were Winston, a former public servant who ran a caravan park on the Mornington Peninsula, and Mary née Burchett. She is the niece of the journalist Wilfred Burchett.

Alexander has married and divorced twice. Her first husband, Rupert Montague, known as Monty, was a Jamaican she met in London. In Melbourne they opened The Jamaica House restaurant three weeks after the birth of their daughter Lisa. Her second husband was Maurice Alexander, a barrister, with whom she had another daughter, Holly.

== Bibliography ==
- Menu for Food Lovers (1985, revised 2003 as Stephanie's Menus for Food Lovers)
- Stephanie's Feasts & Stories (1988)
- Stephanie's Australia (1992)
- Stephanie's Seasons (1995)
- The Cook's Companion (1996, revised 2004, 2014 and 2026)
- Recipes My Mother Gave Me (1997)
- Stephanie's Journal (1997)
- A Shared Table (2000)
- Cooking & Travelling in South-West France (2002)
- Tuscan Cookbook (co-written with Maggie Beer, 2003)
- Kitchen Garden Cooking with Kids (2006)
- The Kitchen Garden Companion (2009)
- A Cook's Life (2012)
- The Cook's Table (2015)
- Kitchen Garden Companion: Growing (2016)
- Kitchen Garden Companion: Cooking (2017)
- The Cook's Apprentice (2018)
- Home (2021)
- Fresh (2023)
