= George Frederic Verdon =

Australian politician

George Frederic Verdon K.C.M.G.
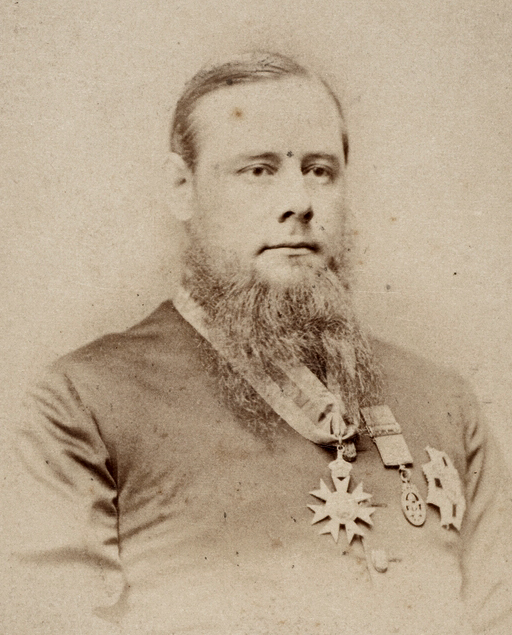
- Sir George Verdon, politician and banker, 1870-1879, by Newman, late Montagu Scott
- Monarch: Victoria

Personal details
- Born: 27 January 1834 Lancashire, England
- Died: 13 August 1896 (aged 62) Victoria (Australia)
- Profession: Statesman

Sir George Frederic Verdon (1834–1896) was an Australian politician and public figure.

== Life ==
Verdon was a son of the Rev. Edward Verdon, he was born in Bury, Lancashire, England 1834 and was educated at Rossall School. In 1851 he emigrated to Melbourne Australia.

As General Manager of the ES&A bank, Verdon commissioned William Wardell to design the bank's Australian headquarters (latter dubbed the Verdon Chambers) in a gothic revival style. The building has since been named by the National Trust of Australia as a building of world significance.

In 1874 Verdon purchased 18 acres of land that had been reserved by the Victorian colonial government for the construction of a country house for the Governor near the top of Mount Macedon. He named the property Alton, after Alton Tower in England and after enlarging the property through purchase of neighbouring holdings, Alton House, a large Venetian Gothic mansion and stately gardens was designed and constructed under his direction.
