= English, Scottish and Australian Bank, The Rocks =

Former bank building in Sydney, Australia

English, Scottish and Australian Bank, The Rocks (former)
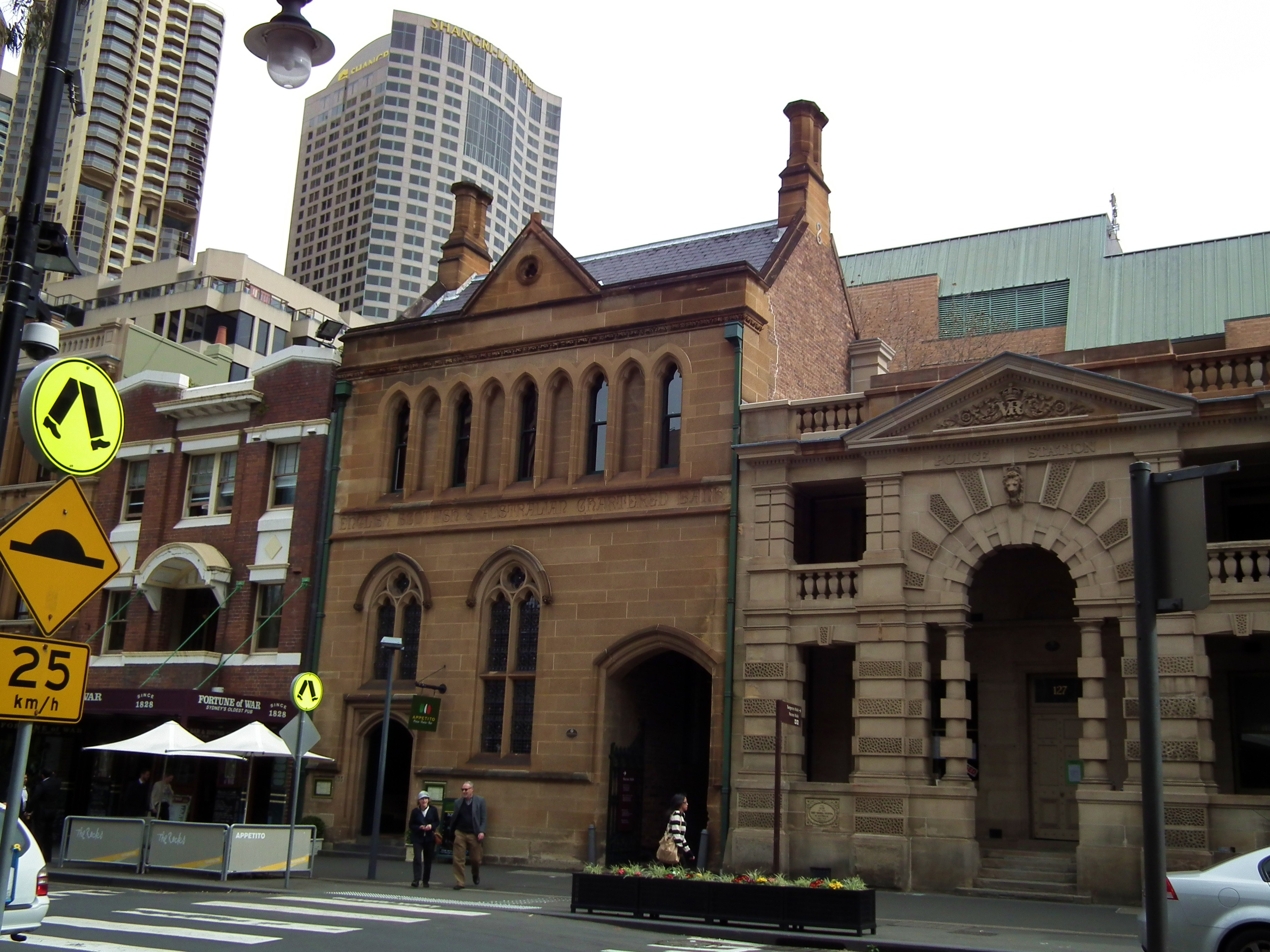
- The former English, Scottish and Australian Bank, The Rocks branch, pictured in 2012

- Location within Sydney Location within Australia
- 33.8603°S 151.2084°E
- Location: 131–135 George Street, The Rocks, City of Sydney, New South Wales, Australia

History
- Built: 1886

Site notes
- Architect: William Wardell
- Architectural style: Venetian Gothic Revival
- Owner: Sydney Harbour Foreshore Authority

New South Wales Heritage Register
- Official name: English Scottish & Australian Chartered Bank (former) - Amo Roma Restaurant; Vault Restaurant; Instit. Marine Power Engineers; Five Bells; Ox on the Rocks
- Type: State heritage (built)
- Designated: 10 May 2002
- Reference no.: 1544
- Type: Bank
- Category: Commercial

The Rocks branch of the English, Scottish and Australian Bank (also known as the English, Scottish and Australian Chartered Bank) is a heritage-listed former bank building and now restaurant located at 131–135 George Street in the inner city Sydney suburb of The Rocks in the City of Sydney local government area of New South Wales, Australia. It was designed by William Wardell and built during 1886. It is also known as the English Scottish & Australian Chartered Bank (former) - Amo Roma Restaurant and Vault Restaurant; the Institute of Marine Power Engineers; Five Bells; and Ox on the Rocks. The property is owned by the Sydney Harbour Foreshore Authority, an agency of the Government of New South Wales. It was added to the New South Wales State Heritage Register on 10 May 2002.

== History ==
=== Hospital ===
In 1788, the site was first occupied by Europeans as the location of the first hospital in Australia. In 1816, the hospital was relocated to Macquarie Street, and the site passed into private use. Between 1816–1882, the hospital building on the site was used for residential and retail, notably boarding houses and small shops. Granted to William Davis in December 1836 as 14 3/4 perches. Houses on this allotment on 1834 survey. By 1883 the hospital building and later structures had been demolished.

=== English, Scottish and Australian Chartered Bank ===
The English, Scottish and Australian Bank (ES&A) purchased the subject site in 1883. Architect William Wardell was commissioned to design the building for the site. The branch opened in 1885. The building was two storey, with seven rooms, of sandstone facade with slate roofing, in Venetian Gothic Revival style. In 1900 the bubonic plague broke out and an area of land, which included the subject site, was resumed by the government. The ES&A; Bank re-acquired the building in 1909. During the 1920s the ES&A; company entered a period of spectacular growth. However, during the 1930s many branches were closed due to the financial squeeze of the Depression. The Rocks branch was closed in 1934.

=== Australian Institute of Marine and Power Engineers ===
In 1938 the ES&A Bank sold the site to the Australian Institute of Marine and Power Engineers (AIMPE) with the site coming into control of the union's Sydney district committee. The building was occupied by AIMPE until 1971, when the union relocated its offices to Ultimo.

=== Sydney Cove Redevelopment Authority ===
Ownership of the property was transferred to Sydney Cove Redevelopment Authority (SCRA) in 1971. In the mid 1970s the environment surrounding the site underwent changes. The store buildings and fruiter behind the bank building were demolished to accommodate the construction of the State Archives building and the development of Nurses Walk, linking the various courts and lanes. Additions to the bank building included the Gothic styled porch and external timber stairway to the rear entry.

==== Restaurants ====
In 1974 the building was modified for use as a wine bar and restaurant; the office partitioning was removed to create open plan dining areas, and kitchens were installed. The building continues to function as a restaurant.

== Description ==
A branch of the English, Scottish and Australian Chartered Bank (ES&A Bank) was designed by William Wardell. The building is two storied, with seven rooms, of sandstone with slate roofing, in a Gothic style widely used by the ES&A Bank and Wardell.

=== Condition ===
As at 27 April 2001, the archaeological assessment condition was assessed as partly disturbed. The site is level with George Street. The level of ground in vicinity of Nurses Walk has been lowered, as indicated by neighbouring level of sandstone bedrock, however a substantial archaeological resource may exist beneath the building to inform of past land uses. An underfloor deposit may remain.

=== Modifications and dates ===
- 1890s/1910s – further brick outbuildings of three stories added to the back.
- c. 1920 – stores and workshops added to the rear of the property, and a craft metal workshop commenced business.
- 1938 – The AIMPE had alterations made to the building, with Llewellyn E. Williams the architect and T. P. Lloyd the contractor (plaque inside the building).
- 1976 – SCRA demolished all outbuildings.
- 1979 – upon completion of the State Archives building, the Surgeons Court was established by SCRA, and the new porch and connecting stair date from that time.

== Heritage listing ==
As at 30 March 2011, the former English Scottish and Australian Bank (ES&A Bank) and site are of State heritage significance for their historical and scientific cultural values. The site and building are also of State heritage significance for their contribution to The Rocks area which is of State Heritage significance in its own right.

The former ES&A Bank at 135 George Street has cultural significance for its aesthetic, historic, social and research potential values. It shows evidence of the significant human activities of commerce, land tenure and leisure, and is associated with several significant historical events, phases and persons including; early colonial settlement, 1880s boom economy, the bank crash of 1893, the outbreak of bubonic plague of 1900, the Great Depression of the 1930s, the Green Bans movement of the 1960s/70s, and noted architect William Wardell.

The primary significance of 135 George Street stems from it being designed by prominent architect William Wilkinson Wardell. It is the only known surviving example of a stone Gothic Revival bank building designed by Wardell in NSW. It is one of only three known bank buildings (Adelaide, Melbourne & Sydney) designed by Wardell in this style, of which only two survive. The Adelaide building was demolished. The building is significant as it demonstrates Wardell's individual interpretation of the Gothic Revival style at a time when eclecticism and historicist approach to design was prominent. It contains sufficient evidence to reconstruct the spatial qualities of the original banking chamber.

- High Significance Fabric: Roofs (front section of building); east (front facade) Pyrmont yellowblock sandstone walls and brass sheathed timber entrance door; north/south party walls; north & west facades- walls and windows.
- Medium Significance Fabric: East facade-metal frame stained windows; north/south party walls-dry pressed brickwork above original coping.
- Low Significance Fabric: Contributory - Lower part of west archway-painted brickwork; remaining external walls-timber frame double hung windows & four panel timber door (rear); west stair-timber gothic style stair.

The Rocks branch of the English Scottish and Australian Bank was listed on the New South Wales State Heritage Register on 10 May 2002 having satisfied the following criteria.

The place is important in demonstrating the course, or pattern, of cultural or natural history in New South Wales.

The site shows evidence of significant human activities in commerce (banking) and land tenure (historical sub-division patterns and processes), because it is associated with four significant historical events or phases (early British colonisation and settlement to the mid 1810s, the first hospital in Australia 1788–1816, the Bubonic Plague outbreak of 1900, the Green Ban movement of the 1960s and 70s), and because it is associated with three significant persons (Surgeon Jamison, Governor Macquarie and William Wardell). The site is historically representative at the Local level because it has attributed typical of the particular philosophies and activities of colonial era "town planning" in Sydney.

The building has historic significance because it shows evidence of significant human activities in commerce and leisure, is associated with five significant historical events (Australian financial boom c. 1885, bank crash of 1893, bubonic plague outbreak of 1900, Great Depression of 1930s, urban redevelopment of 1960s/70s) and one significant person (William Wardell), and shows continuity of a historical process (the continuing adaptation of a built form to diverse uses in response to a changing social environment). It is historically representative at the Regional level because it has the principal characteristics of an important class of items (mid-Victorian bank branches, especially ES&A; branches around Sydney) and is outstanding because of its harbourside setting and small size. It is historically rare at the State level because it is a scarce example of the Venetian Gothic style, particularly for secular buildings.

The place has a strong or special association with a person, or group of persons, of importance of cultural or natural history of New South Wales's history.

The site is associated with several significant figures including Surgeon Jamison, Governor Macquarie, the building itself was designed by prominent architect William Wardell.

The place is important in demonstrating aesthetic characteristics and/or a high degree of creative or technical achievement in New South Wales.

The building is aesthetically distinctive for its Gothic Revival style, has landmark qualities for its bold yet decorative design and harbourside location, and exemplifies the particular tastes, styles and technologies of colonial Gothic Revivalism.It is representative at the State level for its attributes typical of the rare venetian Gothic style, and is outstanding because of the integrity of its setting, condition of the front façade and size as a nineteenth-century bank branch. The building in its current form is also representative of a 1930s fitout. It is rare at a State level because of its demonstration of the designs and techniques of the Gothic Revival style, and is a scarce surviving example of the small-scale Gothic Revival, secular commercial work of William Wardell. At the time of its design a bank in the Gothic Revival style broke with the tradition of classical bank design. Structure and spaces that remain from Wardell's design are of high significance as they demonstrate the intent of his design. There is potential to reveal the two storey space and original ceiling of the banking chamber space.

The place has a strong or special association with a particular community or cultural group in New South Wales for social, cultural or spiritual reasons.

The Rocks area, to which the building contributes, is held in high esteem by The Rocks community (as reflected by the green bans) and has special cultural, social, aesthetic and education values to state and national groups as indicated by the large numbers of visitors to the area. The building is identified with by those familiar with Wardell's work (as indicated by its listing with the NSW National Trust, the Heritage Council of NSW and the Register of the National Estate). It is rare because it is a scarce example of a small scale, Venetian Gothic style secular building.

The place has potential to yield information that will contribute to an understanding of the cultural or natural history of New South Wales.

The site is an important reference site and is of research significance because of its potential contribution to reveal information and understanding (though potential limited) about early European cultural history and use of the site. The building has much potential to reveal details of Wardell's design such as materials, methods and spatial relationships by investigation of the interior. The facade, basic form and safe demonstrate to the public its former use as a rare Gothic Revival style bank. There is potential to reinstate the spatial qualities of the banking chamber by removal of the concrete floor over the chamber.

The place possesses uncommon, rare or endangered aspects of the cultural or natural history of New South Wales.

The building is assessed as aesthetically rare statewide. This item is assessed as scientifically rare statewide. This item is assessed as socially rare regionally.

The place is important in demonstrating the principal characteristics of a class of cultural or natural places/environments in New South Wales.

This item is assessed as historically representative regionally. This item is assessed as socially representative locally.

== See also ==
- Australian non-residential architectural styles
