= Talana (house) =

Heritage-listed house in Melbourne, Victoria, Australia

- Location of the house in Greater Metropolitan Melbourne

General information
- Status: Completed
- Type: House
- Architectural style: Federation Queen Anne
- Location: 1 Harcourt Street, Hawthorn, City of Boroondara, Melbourne, Victoria, Australia
- Coordinates: 37°49′03″S 145°02′47″E
- Completed: 1899; 127 years ago

Technical details
- Material: Red bricks; Marseilles tiles; timber

Design and construction
- Architect: John Beswicke

Victorian Heritage Register
- Official name: Talana
- Type: Registered place
- Criteria: d.
- Designated: 20 June 2019
- Heritage overlay no.: HO247
- Category: Residential buildings (private)

Register of the National Estate
- Official name: Talana
- Type: Defunct register
- Designated: undated
- Reference no.: 19936

Talana is a house located at 1 Harcourt Street in Hawthorn, in the City of Boroondara, in the inner eastern suburbs of Melbourne, in Victoria, Australia.

Built in 1899 on the traditional lands of the Wurundjeri people, the house was added to the Victorian Heritage Register on 20 June 2019 in recognition of its architectural significance; and was also added to the non-statutory and now defunct Register of the National Estate on an unknown date.

== History ==
=== Hawthorn and its subdivision ===
In 1838 Robert Hoddle surveyed the Parish of Boroondara, which included the suburb of Hawthorn. The first land sales occurred in the 1840s. Due to its close proximity to the city, it was settled earlier than other eastern suburbs. After the separation of the Colony of Victoria from the Colony of New South Wales and the beginning of the gold-rush era in 1851, the price of land dropped. As a consequence, there was an increased demand for Hawthorn allotments by speculators. The value of these purchases trebled in the next few years. Most notable was James Murphy's purchase of Allotment 70, 124 acreson the north west corner of Burke and Barkers Road, which became known as 'Murphy's Paddock'.

In the mid-1850s, Murphy subdivided this into the 'Village of Rathmines Estate' and a series of lots in the Harcourt Street area were created and new houses built. The construction of a bridge across the Yarra River and the establishment of the Hawthorn railway station in 1861 further encouraged development. During Melbourne's building boom of the 1880s, many villas and mansions set in large gardens were constructed in this area and throughout Hawthorn, occupied by business professions and their families.

=== Harcourt Street and John Beswicke ===
Between 1873 and 1900 architect John Beswicke designed and built fifteen houses in Harcourt Street, the last of which was Talana, completed in 1900. Fourteen of Beswicke's houses are extant. Talana was commissioned by James Christie and his wife Annie (née Reid). All of Beswicke's other Harcourt Street houses were Victorian Italianate in design. Talana was designed in the Federation Queen Anne style, which was at the time becoming increasingly fashionable. In 1902 a notice of sale described it as 'modern and magnificent' inside and out and one of the most up-to-date houses in Melbourne. In the early 1900s, Harcourt Street was a sought-after address and Talana was part of a coveted group of grand mansions that was accessible to the city by train. It was 'replete with every convenience', commanded 'unrivalled views' and had been designed with 'careful forethought and refined taste'.

It is generally acknowledged that the Beswicke houses in Harcourt Street represent an exceptional legacy of a single architect's work. Although they are not contiguously located, the houses all have deep front gardens and similar setbacks and contribute to an impressive streetscape.

== Description ==
Talana is architecturally significant as a notable and fine example of a large mansion constructed in the Federation Queen Anne style. Impressive in its scale and its prominent siting on a corner block, Talana is a two-storey house of asymmetrical design built using red bricks with dominant chimneys, the polygonal corner bay, a distinctive Beswicke motif in the series of gables around a turret or candle snuffer roof which is also evident at his own residence, Rotha at 29 Harcourt Street, decorative timber balustrade, the complex Marseilles tiled hipped roof, and the decorative half-timbered gable ends. Internally, there are highly ornate and unusual plasterwork ceilings to the principal rooms on the ground floor and decorative timber balustrades, doors and joinery throughout. These elements are of a higher quality than are typical of the class. Talana is enhanced by its generous garden setting, with deep open setbacks from both street frontages and the open area to the north-east.

Talana is a substantially intact mansion which is a landmark in Auburn Road and Harcourt Street and is the most elaborate Queen Anne residence in Melbourne. The house is extremely large. The two storey height is emphasised by an extra high ground floor, a raised plinth above ground level, and the large hipped roof. Although the house has a basic gable wing, to coordinate point form, it departs from the standard Queen Anne pattern in several areas. The principal facade to Harcourt Street has overlaid on the basic form, a tower and entry porch gable feature and the return verandah is a highly individual design. The corner bay expression in the verandah is atypical and the Gothic tracery in the tower window unusual on a Queen Anne design. Given their date, the roof tiles are probably of imported French origin along with the cappings and griffon. Although the building addresses the corner site with its corner balcony, the principal facade is clearly Harcourt Street. The grounds provide an appropriate context for the building but do not contain a garden which makes a contribution on its own.

== See also ==
- Architecture of Melbourne
- List of places on the Victorian Heritage Register in the City of Boroondara
