= Doubter =

Doubter may mean:

- One who experiences doubt
- A skeptic
- An old type of candle snuffer
