= John Beswicke =

Australian architect (1847–1925)

- Born: 1847; Geelong(?), Victoria
- Died: 1925 (aged 77–78)
- Education: Geelong Grammar School
- Occupation: Architect
- Parents: Charles Beswicke; Elizabeth Keys
- Practice: Wilson & Beswicke; Beswicke & Hutchins; Beswicke & Coote
- Projects: 15 houses on Harcourt St, Hawthorn

John Beswicke (1847 – 1925) was an Australian architect who practiced in Melbourne between the 1870s and 1915. He is known to have designed approximately 300 buildings, including 203 houses, nine bank buildings, fourteen church buildings, 44 commercial buildings, eleven hotel buildings, fifteen institutional buildings such as hospitals, 45 shops and six large town halls.

== Early years and background ==
Beswicke was born in 1847, a son of Charles Beswicke and Elizabeth Keys, who had both arrived in the Port Phillip district in the 1840s. In 1847, his parents married and they had three daughters and two sons, John being their second son. John Beswicke went to Geelong Grammar School and in 1862 was apprenticed to the firm Crouch & Wilson at age 16, where he continued to work for 18 years, finishing as head assistant.

== Career ==
While employed at Crouch & Wilson, Beswicke worked on prominent projects including the Deaf School and Blind Institute, both built in the 1860s on St Kilda Road, the main building for the Methodist Ladies' College in Hawthorn in 1882, and numerous churches, as well as some of his own projects. The practice of Crouch & Wilson passed to the sons of the principals in 1881, when Crouch retired, and Ralph Wilson left to join with Bewicke to create Wilson & Beswicke on 2 January 1882, until Wilson's death in 1889. After this he was often in sole practice as J. Beswicke, and also in other partnerships including Beswicke & Hutchins (1889–90), and Beswicke & Coote (1890–93).

Amongst his prolific output was a series of grand houses in Harcourt Street in Hawthorn, many for his family, from the 1870s to 1900;. Of the fifteen buildings he designed for Harcourt Street, fourteen are extant. His father bought land in Harcourt Street in 1873 and moved from Geelong into a house at No 5, which Beswicke designed while he was at Crouch & Wilson; called 'Les Avents', later 'Carn Brae', altered in the 1920s. Beswicke's own residence 'Rotha' at No 29 was built in 1887; and in 1900 he built the even grander 'Talana' on the corner of Auburn Road for his wife, but she preferred to stay at 'Rotha'.

Beswicke was associated as a consulting designer with a number of property and building companies in the Boom period of the 1880s. One of these was the Australian Property and Investment Co; he had designed houses and subdivisions for one of the directors, and his brother in law had been a manager. He was invited to a limited competition called in 1888 by the company to design a twelve-storey office building on the corner of Elizabeth Street and Flinders Lane, which was won by Henry Hardie Kemp, who soon took on partners to become Oakden, Addison and Kemp. Beswicke was included in the project as he had studied tall buildings, and probably provided technical advice, while the Queen Anne style of what became known as the Australian Building (aka APA Building) was Kemp's. The remarkable structure was amongst the worlds tallest at the time, and it remained Melbourne's tallest until the 1920s, and was demolished in 1980.

He designed a number of notable shop/office/residence blocks in a distinctive eclectic style that included polychrome brickwork with cement render classical details over three storeys; there are two such blocks in Auburn Village in Hawthorn, on Auburn Road, near Burwood Road, and a larger one on Brunswick Street, Fitzroy; renamed in his honour as the Beswicke Building.

Some of his houses feature distinctive corner turrets with 'candle snuffer' roofs, his own house Rotha sports the first example, with square turrets on the three houses at 5, 7, 9 Yarra Street, Hawthorn, with later examples on Redholme (Warwillah) and Talana. Another distinctive feature is the use of decorative gables on each face of a polygonal bay window, also seen on his own house Rotha, on Derriweit Heights, and in simpler versions on single-storey houses.

== Selected projects ==
The following is a selected list of Beswicke's architectural projects.

Project	Image	Date	Location	Description	Notes
Les Avents		1873	5 Harcourt St, Hawthorn	Later known as Carn Brae; altered in the 1920s; the first of fifteen houses designed by Beswicke and built on Harcourt St, between 1873 and 1900	
Tudor Lodge		1873	13 Harcourt St, Hawthorn	Later known as Hilton House	
Keysborough Methodist Church (now Uniting Church)		1877	Chapel Rd, Keysborough		
Lexinton		1878	7 Harcourt St, Hawthorn	Later known as Murtoa	
Bendigonia		1882	25 Queens Rd, Melbourne	As Wilson & Beswicke	
St Kilda Presbyterian Church		1883	Barkly St and Alma Rd, St. Kilda		
Tudor House		1884	Cnr. Pasco and Electra sts, Williamstown	As Wilson & Beswicke; added to the Victorian Heritage Register	
Brighton Town Hall		1885	Brighton		
Malvern Town Hall		1886	Malvern	As Wilson & Beswicke; added to the Victorian Heritage Register	
Essendon Town Hall (former)		1886	Essendon	As Wilson & Beswicke	
Rotha		1887	29 Harcourt St, Hawthorn	Beswicke's own home; added to the Victorian Heritage Register	
Beswicke Buildings		1888	236–252 Brunswick St, Fitzroy	Large three-storey building with ground floor shops and residences above each shop; added to the Victorian Heritage Register	
Hawthorn Town Hall		1888	Hawthorn		
Dandenong Town Hall		1890	Dandenong	As Beswicke & Hutchins	
Miharo		1890	145 Noble St, Newtown, Geelong	As Beswicke & Coote; added to the Victorian Heritage Register	
Cullymont		1890	4 Selwyn St, Canterbury	Semi-detached pair of Victorian Italianate terraces; both added to the Victorian Heritage Register	
Eyre Court		1890	2 Molesworth St, Canterbury	Semi-detached pair of Victorian Italianate terraces; both added to the Victorian Heritage Register	
		1890	5, 7 & 9 Yarra St, Hawthorn	Terraced row of three houses	
Auburn Village Shops and Residences		c. 1890	Auburn	Two three-storey buildings with ground floor shops and residences above each shop	
Westella		1891	39 Kinkora Rd, Hawtorn	As Beswicke & Coote	
Tourmont		1891	79 Balwyn Rd, Balwyn	Now part of the Fintona Girls' School	
Derriweit Heights		1893	Douglas Rd, Mount Macedon	Added an additional floor; destroyed in the 1983 Ash Wednesday bushfires	
Kawarau		1895	405 Tooronga Rd, Hawthorn	As Beswicke & Coote; added to the Victorian Heritage Register	
Redholme		1896	572 St Kilda Rd, Melbourne	Later known as Warwillah	
Talana		1900	1 Harcourt St, Hawthorn	The last of fifteen houses designed by Beswicke and built on Harcourt St, between 1873 and 1900 and the only house in the Queen Anne Revival style; added to the Victorian Heritage Register	
