= Beverley Ussher (architect) =

Australian architect

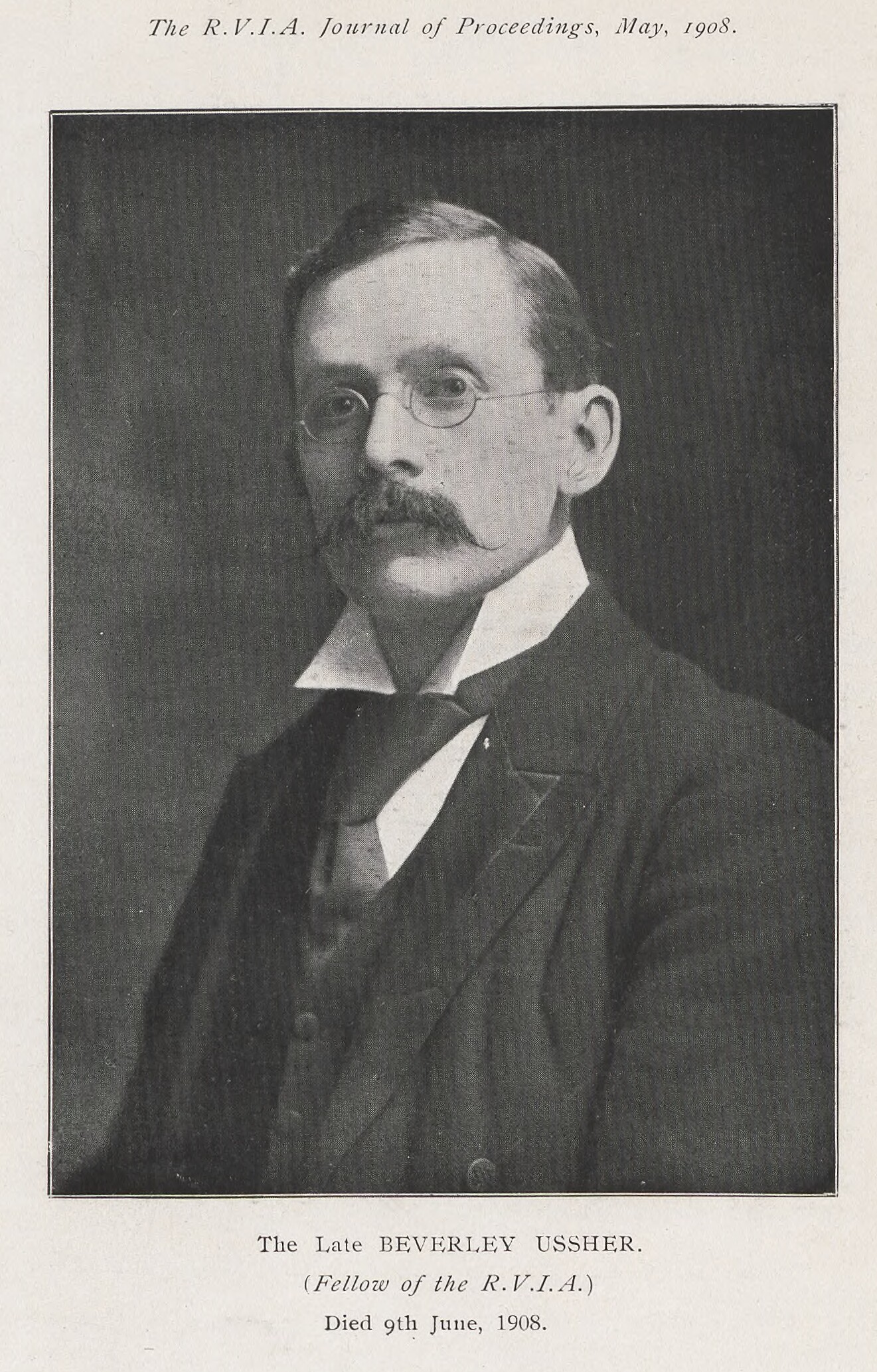
Beverley Ussher, 1897

Beverley Ussher (1868–1908) was an Australian architect who practiced mainly in Melbourne, Victoria from the 1880s until his death in 1908, aged only 40. He is known for the development of the local residential style, the Federation Queen Anne (also known as Queen Anne, Federation or Edwardian), characterised by complex tall red tiled roofs, with projecting half-timbered gables and dormers and wide timber verandahs, that became standard for houses across Melbourne and Victoria in the period 1900–1915. He began developing the style from about 1892 in a series of houses, but is best known as part of the partnership of Ussher & Kemp from 1899 to 1908, which produced some of the most outstanding designs in the new Queen Anne mode.

== Early influences ==
Beverley Ussher (1868 - 9 June 1908) was born in Melbourne, the son of a Methodist minister. He is thought to have articled in the mid-1880s with architect Alfred Dunn, newly arrived from his own articles with Alexander Lauder in Devon in the UK. After Ussher completed his articles he visited England and the Continent in 1887–8.

By then the dominant residential style in Britain was the Queen Anne Revival, which was beginning to have an impact on Australian architecture. The style was pioneered by architects Richard Norman Shaw and William Eden Nesfield in the late 1860s, creating a new picturesque architecture drawing elements from vernacular and late medieval houses, like half timbering and hanging tiles walling, red brick walls, projecting gables and tall chimneys. In Victoria, local architects including Oakden, Addison and Kemp, Nahum Barnet, Reed Smart & Tappin, and Hyndeman & Bates introduced the new approach and style to Melbourne from the late 1880s in both residential and commercial work. Alfred Dunn himself also produced Queen Anne house designs from 1890. Two of the partners of Oakden, Addison & Kemp - Henry Hardie Kemp and G. H. M. Addison - were British trained architects who had experienced the Queen Anne Revival first hand. The Queen Anne influence had already resulted in houses in this new idiom in Sydney as early as 1885, such as the grand Penshurst (demolished) by Walter Liberty Vernon. The style there is now known as Federation, and was very similar to the Queen Anne as practiced in Victoria, but somewhat different in materials and details.

While in London, Ussher possibly met English architect Walter Butler (1864 –1949), who knew Alfred Dunn because he had also articled with Lauder. Butler was then working in London, moving within Arts and Crafts circles, and knew the designers W R Lethaby and Ernest Gimson. In 1888, perhaps with Ussher's encouragement, Butler emigrated to Melbourne, along with many of his siblings.

== Ussher & Butler ==
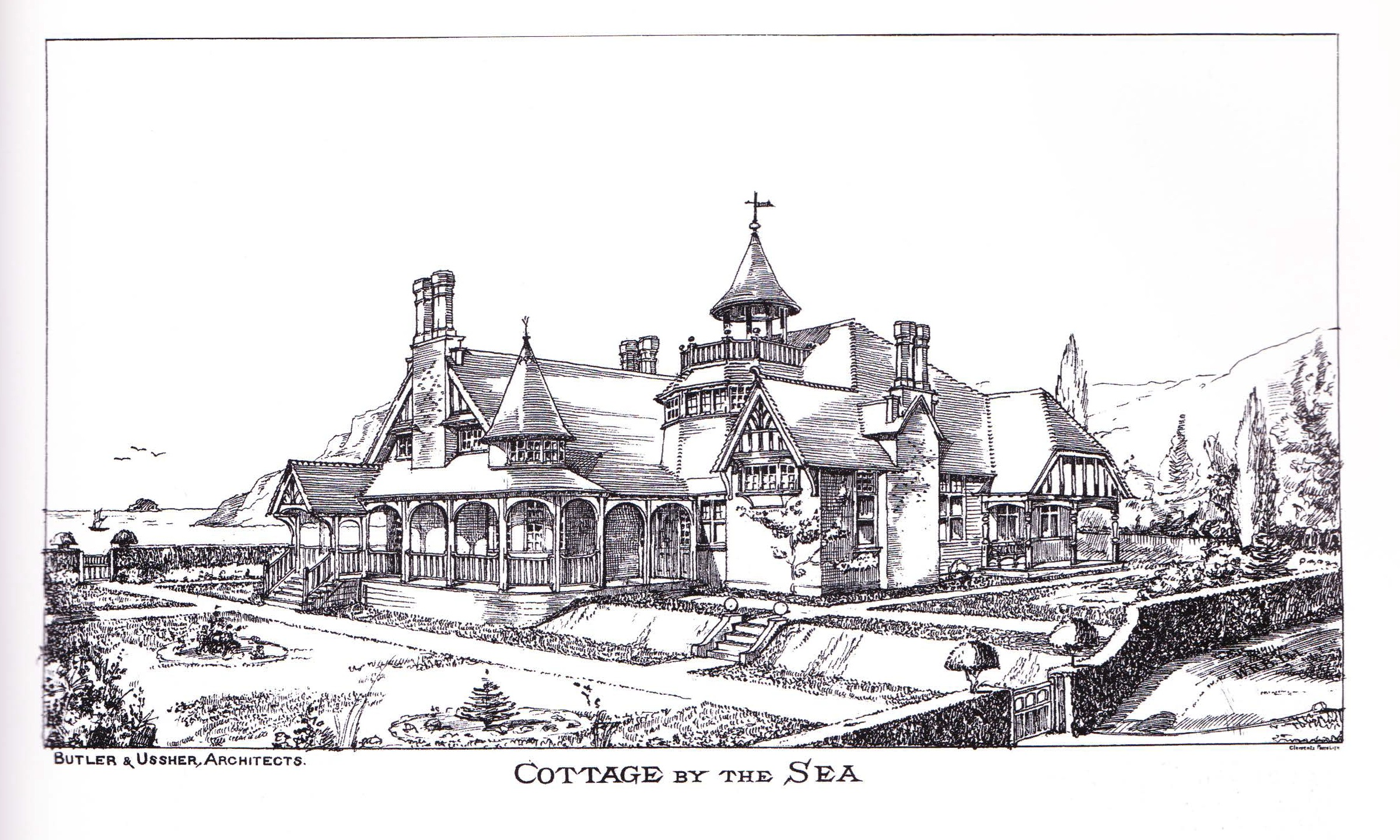
Cottage by the Sea, Ussher & Butler, 1892

Both Ussher and Butler worked briefly together in Dunn's office, and then left to form a partnership in 1889. They worked together until about 1893, but do not seem to have produced much of note. The 1891 parsonage for the Wesleyan Church in Yarra street Geelong is an interesting polychrome brick design with a Queen Anne derived half-timbered gable and turned-timber verandah. The outstanding design of this period was Blackwood Homestead, near Dunkeld in western Victoria, built 1892–94. A sprawling single storey house with low bluestone walls and a tall, very long red-tiled roof and projecting prominent half-timbered gabled bays, the tiles and the gables a standard feature of the later Queen Anne villas. The Heritage Victoria citation notes that the "composition of the main building gives a distinctly Australian character to an architectural idiom derived principally from contemporary English works."

In 1892 a sketch titled Cottage by the Sea by Ussher & Butler was published, signed by Butler. This was a large, rambling design with many features that would go on to define the Queen Anne villa, such as half-timbered gables, turrets and gazebos pushing through the extensive tiled roofs, tall chimneys and a wrap-around single level timber verandah.

By 1893, the country was in the grip of a depression that curtailed work for many architects, and the partners split up. Butler worked on his own briefly, then with George Inskip right up until 1907, then with Ernest Bradshaw, and was responsible for many notable houses in variations on the Queen Anne and especially the Arts & Crafts styles.

== Sole Practice ==
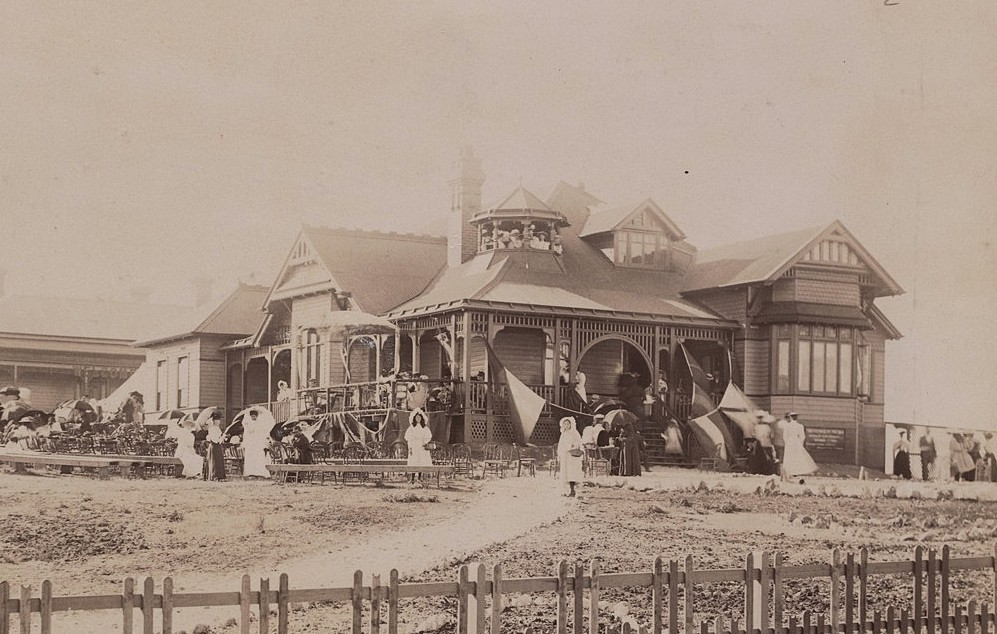
The Cottage by the Sea, Queenscliff, 1895

Ussher practised on his own for about six years, continuing to develop the new domestic Queen Anne style with a series of houses, many now demolished. These houses introduce all of the features that would define the typical later Queen Anne villa. They include :

- 21 Trafalgar Road, Camberwell (1893), which has Queen Anne features such as red brick, half-timbered gable and a turned timber verandah, but quite steep proportions and gables at different pitches.
- The orphanage called The Cottage by the Sea in sea-side Queenscliff designed by Ussher was opened in 1895 (and demolished in the 1930s). It is not known if there is any connection with the 1892 design of the same name by Ussher & Butler, but what was built was much smaller and more restrained. It is very much a precursor of the Queen Anne villa, with a tall hipped roof that continued over the L-shaped turned-timber verandah, which joined projecting half-timbered gabled bays. The corner was marked by an octagonal gazebo look-out. It was however in weatherboard, with a corrugated iron roof.
- 23 Barry Street, Kew (1896) is closer to the mature Queen Anne, with a profusion of gables and an attic floor, turned timber verandah, and a distinctive 'witches hat' corner turret, but with a rambling plan and roof. The verandah has lost much of its woodwork.
- W. J. Clarke House in Clendon Road, Toorak (1897, demolished) was a large house, featuring a long hip roof with many projecting gabled roofs over two verandahs, which had brick piers instead of timber posts.
- Valetta, Swift Street, Albury (1898, demolished), a 20-room house and surgery built for Dr Woods. A large house with a long hipped roof like the Clarke house, pierced by many gabled bays and dormers, very similar to the Queen Anne villas that would follow. A feature not repeated later was the roof of the main gable continuing down to join the verandah roof, and the light gridded woodwork either side.

In 1894 Ussher designed a store for Brown Corke & Co at 267 Chapel Street Prahran, in a boldly new style for commercial architecture in Melbourne, using red brick, rounded piers, tall arches and Queen Anne detailing.

In 1899, Ussher formed a partnership with Henry Kemp.

== Henry Hardie Kemp ==
Henry Hardie Kemp (1859 -1946) was born in Broughton, Lancashire. He articled in Manchester, and then worked and studied in London in the early 1880s. Arriving in Melbourne in 1886 he found a job with the established firm of Terry & Oakden. Leonard Terry had a distinguished career designing in particular many conservative classical banks, and had died in 1884, while Percy Oakden who joined in 1874 practiced a more progressive restrained polychrome brick Gothic. With the addition of G. H. M. Addison in 1887 the firm became Oakden Addison & Kemp, and was very successful, designing a range of landmark projects in the next few years, including some in Queen Anne style.

North Park (later Woodlands) in Essendon, completed in 1889 demonstrated the style in a grand composition, with its red brick, red tiled roof, and half-timbered gables. The 12 storey Australian Building in Elizabeth Street, amongst the tallest in the world, also featured red brick, and top levels of Queen Anne gables and a turret. Kemp is thought to have been the major driver of this output, since the sketch for North Park is signed by him, and Addison was in Brisbane designing independently, also in Queen Anne mode. Addison formally left the partnership in 1892, which was wound up when Kemp moved to Sydney in 1896.

Nothing is known of his work up until he came back to Melbourne and started the partnership with Ussher. After Ussher died in 1908, Kemp continued alone until 1911 when he joined with George Inskip (swapped for Walter Butler) until 1913. Between 1918 and 1929, he was in partnership with his nephew. F. Bruce Kemp. During this period he designed his own house in Kew, and the early buildings for Scotch College, in a half-timbered style reminiscent of his work with Ussher.

== Ussher & Kemp ==
Ussher & Kemp produced some of the most influential and creative houses in the then-new Queen Anne style characterised by tall red-tiled roofs, projecting half-timbered gables, and timber verandahs, that became standard for houses across Melbourne in the period 1900–1915. This style of house was a complete break from the typical Victorian house of the 1880s, in render or polychrome brick, with Italianate details and cast-iron fringed verandahs. Architectural historian George Tibbits in his 1982 article The so-called Melbourne Domestic Queen Anne calls Ussher & Kemp a "brilliant partnership", who pioneered the application of British Queen Anne Revival influence onto residential work in Melbourne, and considered it to be a truly distinctive Australian creation, though he also notes the houses designed by Ussher alone before the partnership.

A typical Federation Queen Anne house in Melbourne (and Victoria) is attic-style, with an overall picturesque composition formed by a dominant red Marsailles tiled tall hipped roof, broken by projecting gabled bays and dormer windows for the upper floor rooms and tall chimneys. The walls are usually red-brick, with half-timbering and roughcast in the gables above projecting window bays, and a verandah supported on turned timber posts with timber trim. They often feature diagonal planning, with bays projecting on two sides, joined by the L shaped verandah, with the entrance on the corner or down one side, and sometimes a corner turret or gazebo. The planning is often diagonal, with a wide hall either off-centre or behind a front room, entered from the side, with main rooms projecting at right angles or on the corner. The main rooms often employ bay window or fireplace niches, with timber screens across the upper part of the opening. Windows to the main rooms often feature leadlight with Art Nouveau designs.

The work of Ussher & Kemp included all these features from their beginning in 1899, a year that saw at least 10 houses built, and it was undoubtedly one of the most accomplished and prolific of the many residential architects designing across Melbourne in the Edwardian era. Their work included variations on the sprawling attic-style houses, well as a two-storey type with gabled rather than hipped roofs. They designed a number of very large houses, including the mansion Dalswraith in Kew, and the country house Dalvui near Terang. Their work is particularly found in the then-newer subdivisions in the eastern suburbs of Kew, Hawthorn and Camberwell (now collectively the City of Boroondara), and in Malvern.

== Notable works ==
Houses

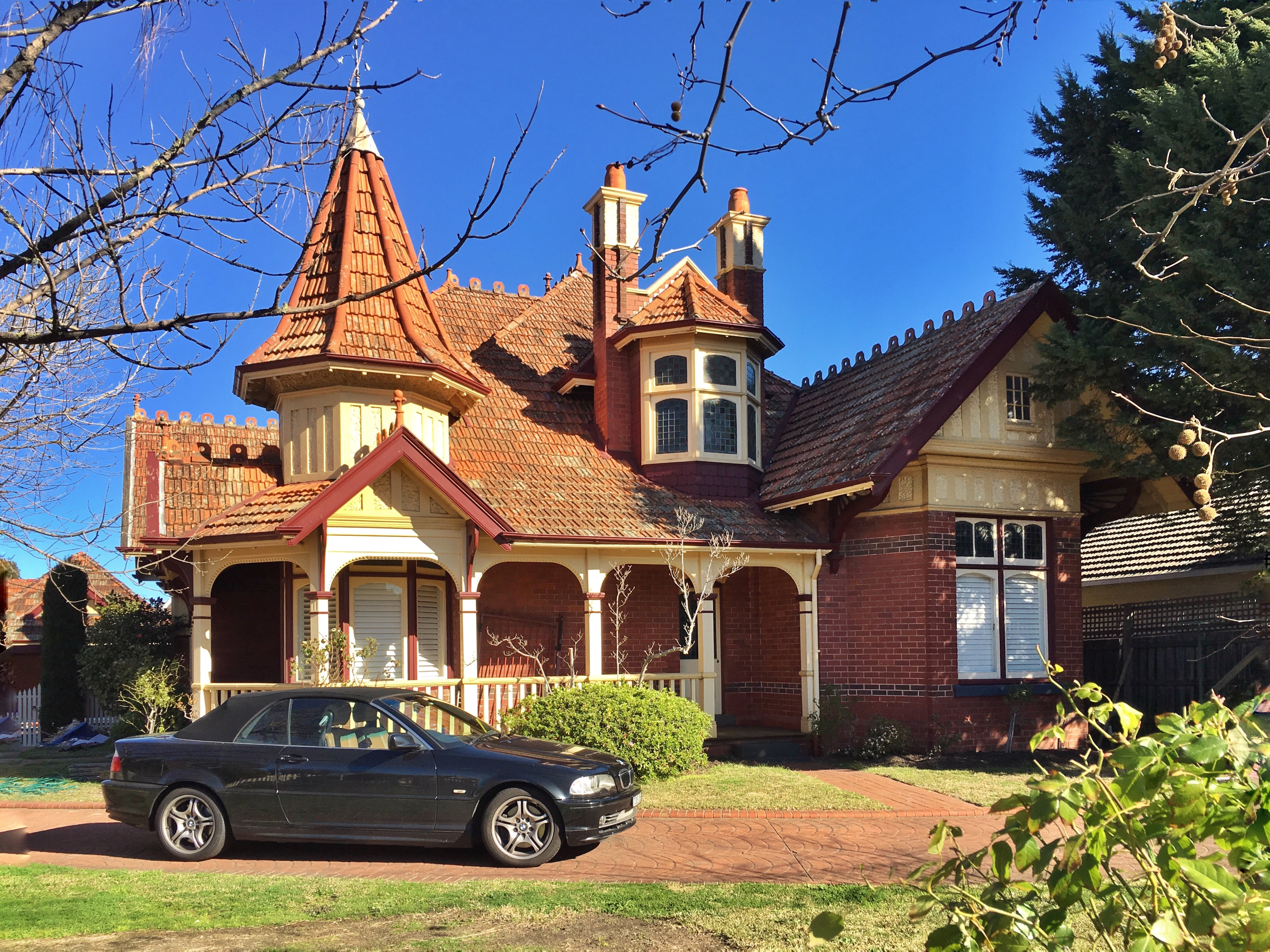
Cupples House, Camberwell, 1899

- Wanganui Homestead, 260 Wanganui Road Shepparton (1899). A symmetrical villa with wide wrap-around timber verandahs, now GOTAFE, William Orr Campus. Possibly by or with local architect J A K Clarke.
- Coorinyah House 150 Mont Albert Road, Canterbury (1899). The broad hipped roof is the dominant backdrop for a number of gabled roof forms, and an unusually high witches-hat shingle roofed look-out, partly wrapped around a chimney. On the north side, the verandah is unusually symmetrical, with a pair of giant arches either side of a central gabled.
- Cupples house, now Travancore, 608 Riversdale Road Camberwell (1899). Designed for George and Mary Ann Thyssen. Considered one of their most sophisticated designs, with the typical pair of gables joined by an L-shaped timber verandah, but also a tall corner turret / bay window, flanked by small gables on the verandah on two sides, and an attic dormer window projecting from between two chimneys.
- Finch Street group, Gascoigne Estate, East Malvern (1899). The Gascoigne Estate had been subdivided in the 1880s, but very few houses were built at the time. In 1899 six substantial houses in a row at Nos. 21-33 Finch Street were built for developer William Knox on the west side at the south end, near Caulfield Station. They are designed in variations of the attic style, and include Merridale (21), Eblana (23), Dunoon (25), Ingleburn (27), and Moanga (31). Thelema (33) is far less inventive, in the form of a two-storey Italianate house, but in red brick with half timbered gables and timber verandah.
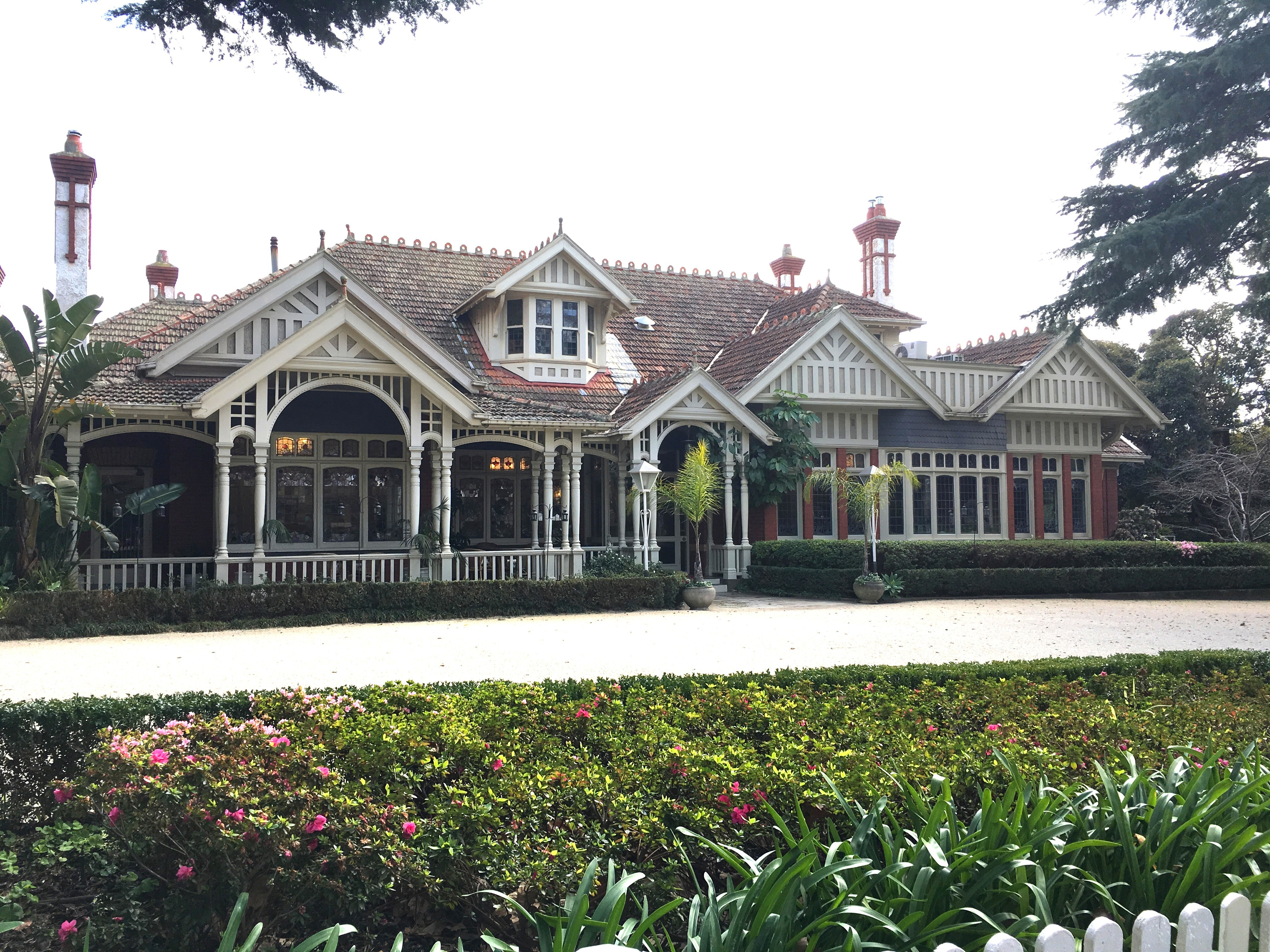
- The Gables, East Malvern, 1903
  Residence, 27 Balwyn Road Camberwell (1899). A house with diagonal planning addressing the street corner, featuring a porch upstairs in front of a gable dormer, and a squat octagonal turret on the corner of the verandah.
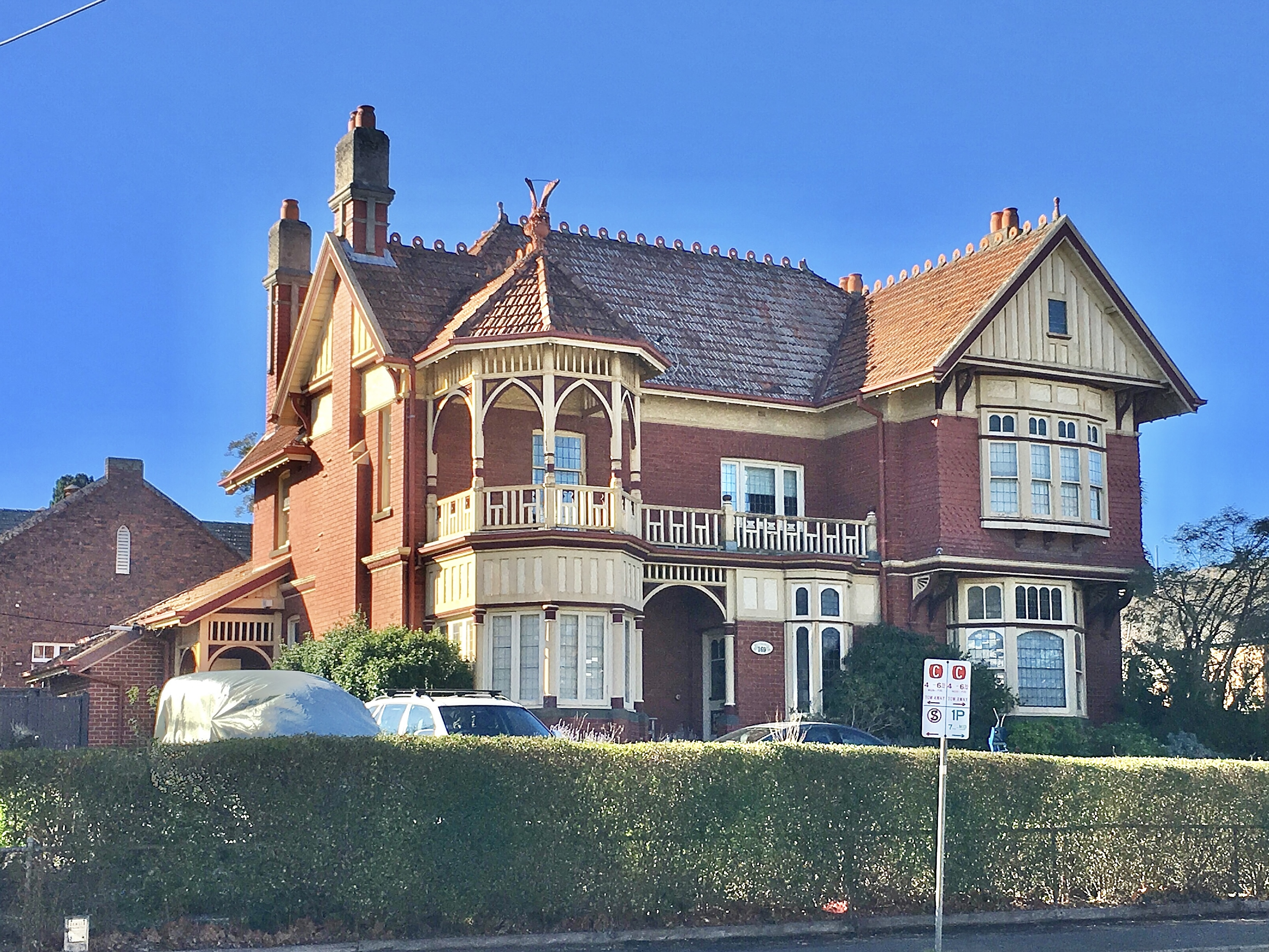
- Dr Armstrong's House, canterbury, 1904
  Seward House 2 Studley Avenue Kew (c1899). A house of the two-storey type with double height gabled bays, and a single level corner verandah.
- Residence, 98 Riversdale Road Hawthorn (1900). A large house in an unusual format for the partnership, with a symmetrical front, a tall hipped slate roof with a single dominant dormer/gable, with paired bay windows flanking a small porch. The verandah is supported on brick piers, as seen on Ussher's W. J. Clarke house of a few years before.
- Halsey house, (Wee Nestie) 69 Broadway, Camberwell (1900–1). A large house placed askew on its large corner site, with multiple gables and verandahs, and originally with a large indented gateway on the corner. Designed for importer William Halsey, converted into Karinyah private hospital in 1959, restored again to a home in recent years.
- Manse, Holy Trinity, Coleraine (1902). A weatherboard example of their typical attic-style design.
- The Gables, 15 Finch Street, East Malvern (1902–03). Located just south of the 1899 Finch Street group of six houses, The Gables is a large house with a long transverse hip roof punctuated by many gables, with four reception rooms on nearly an acre of gardens. Australian flora and fauna features in the plasterwork and leadlight throughout. The grounds were designed by William Guilfoyle of the Royal Botanical gardens, and retains two prominent 120-year-old Himalayan Cedars. Built for local property developer Lawrence Alfred Birchnell, it has been a function centre since the 1940s.
- Davies House, 5 Wilismere Road Kew (1903). Another very large house on a large block askew on the prominent angular site. Though of the attic roof type, the house is so large the hip roof has a long ridge, out of which a profusion of gables and dormers project on all four sides.
- Dr Armstrong House and Surgery, 169 Canterbury Road, Canterbury (1904). A large house of the two-storey gable roof type, with an unusual polygonal bay at one end that forms a gazebo porch on the upper floor.
- Eildon, 34 Thompson Street Hamilton (1904). Built as a residence and surgery for Dr David Laidlaw, and in 1939 purchased by the Napier Club, a women's club established in 1921. An example of the two-storey gabled form, the use of jettied windows at the first floor and closely spaced half timbering in the window bays and the gables lend a more Elizabethan character.
- Kawaru, 405 Tooronga Road, East Hawthorn (1904). For Frederick Cato, the new owner of the 1893 mansion, the firm added a billiard room, and redecorated the interiors with 'the widest known assemblage of decorative art nouveau fibrous plaster and timber work, including exceptional examples in the billiard room.'
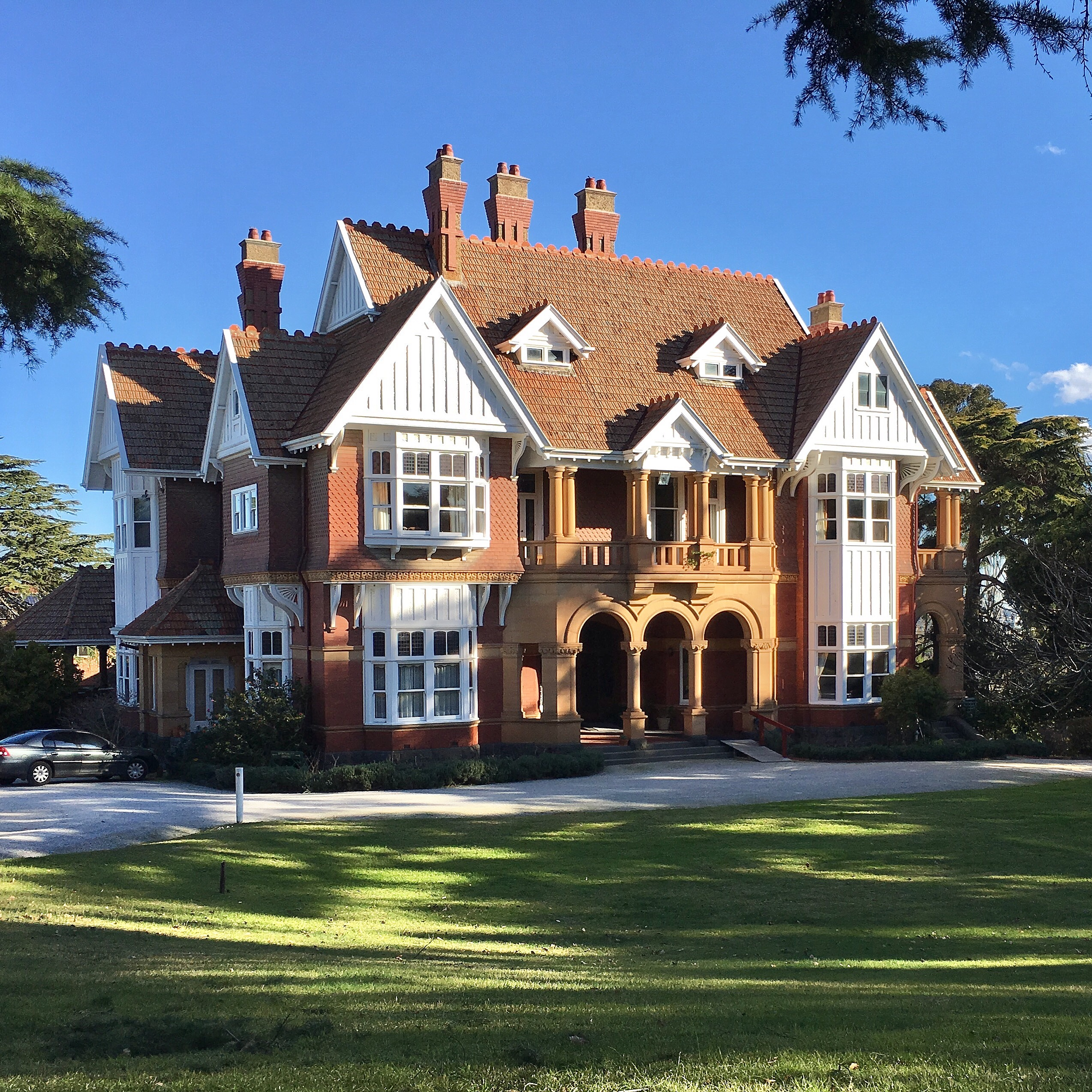
- Dalswraith, Kew
  Arden 1045 Burke Rd Hawthorn East, VIC, (1906, demolished 2017). A large house with multiple gables and dormers including a prominent diagonal gable over the entrance on the verandah, and an unusual fence that included cast-iron panels.
- Avondale 22 Berkeley St Hawthorn (1904). Built for grocer, Benjamin Ratcliffe, it is a wide house with three gables and a verandah across the front. Attributed on stylistic grounds to Ussher & Kemp by the Hawthorn Heritage Study, 1992.
- Dalswraith (later Campion Hall), 99 Studley Park Road Kew (1906). Probably the most outstanding design by the partnership, melding the Federation Queen Anne elements of their two-storey gabled type, but with some axial formality, and a classical double level porch in stone. The jettied first floor bays, closely spaced half-timbering and tile-hung walls of the first floor add a strong medieval flavour. The interior features an interesting stairhall with a circular opening at the first floor, looking into a dome.
- Murndal (additions), 1356 Murndal Road, Tahara (1906). An upper floor was added to the existing bluestone homestead, with multiple linked half-timbered gables and a tall roof, somewhat closer to British late medieval sources than the firm's developed Queen Anne style.
- Dalvui Homestead 4310 Mackinnons Bridge Road, Terang (1908). This large Western District mansion shows distinct Arts & Crafts influence, along with Tudor elements, while still in the half-timbered picturesque tradition. The house was commissioned by Neil Black in 1898, who died at sea, and never saw the completed house.
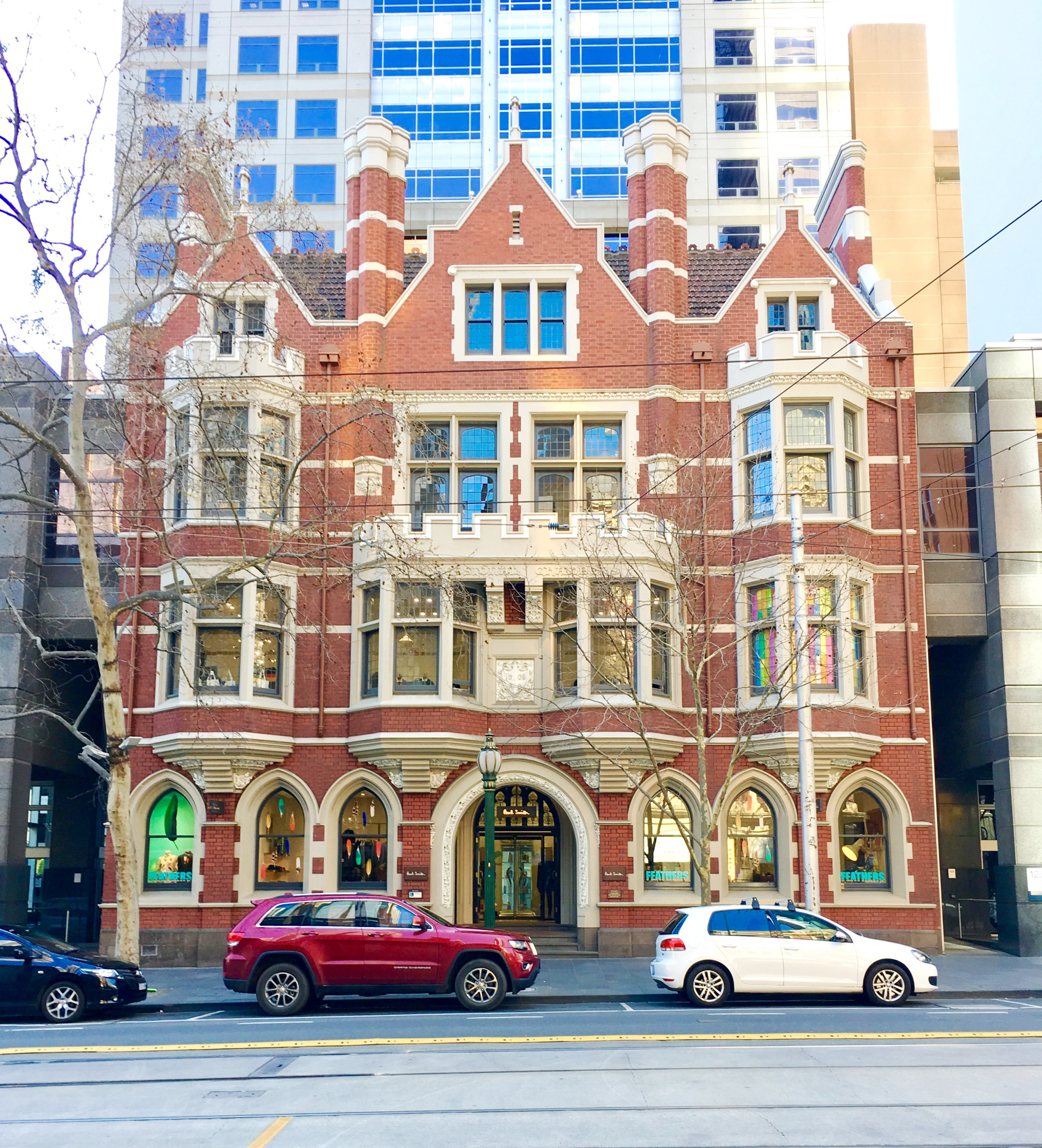
  Professional Chambers, Collins Street
- Norman House, 7 Adeney Avenue, Kew (1908?). A fine example of the attic-style, with the gable roof edges projecting further than usual, and a large dormered porch upstairs. Built for Arthur Norman of the stationery firm Norman Bros. The Kew Conservation Study notes the house was 'not finished' in 1909.
- Carramah, 31 Canterbury Road, Camberwell, Vic. (1909). A house showing some Art & Crafts influence, the main roof a long wide gable with projecting gables and dormers, and simpler detailing. Built for Herbert Parsons a spice trader and set on a large site at an angle to the street.

Other works

- Essendon Tramway Depot, 318 Mount Alexander Road, Travencore (1906). A simple design of two skillion roofed skylit bays, with a front of expressed concrete frame and brick infill panels.
- Glaciarium, City Road, South Melbourne (1906). Melbourne's first ice rink, with a relatively plain facade, and large open space supported by light steel trusses. Demolished 1963.
- Professional Chambers, 110-118 Collins Street (1908). Built on a site owned by the adjacent Independent Church. The three-storey red brick office largely in Elizabethan Revival, but with elements of the Romanesque, Gothic, and the Queen Anne.

== Heritage Listing ==
Virtually all the surviving works by Ussher and Ussher & Kemp have some kind of heritage designation, including by the National Trust of Australia (Victoria) or the Royal Australian Institute of Architects (RAIA) Register of Twentieth Century Buildings, or the Australian Heritage Database. The houses are mostly heritage listed by the various local councils either individually, such as Coorinyah in Canterbury, Dalswraith in Kew and The Gables in East Malvern. A number of places are also listed at the State level by Heritage Victoria, including Murnal in Tahara, Eildon in Hamilton and Kawaru in Hawthorn, as well as the Essnedon Tamway Depot and the Professional Chambers in Collins Street. These structures are also documented in the Victorian Heritage Database, part of the national, highlighting their contribution to Australia's built heritage. For instance, is A-graded in the Kew Urban Conservation Study for its exemplary Old English influences and intact Federation features.[23]

== See also ==
- Australian architectural styles
- Arts and Crafts Movement
- Federation architecture
- Queen Anne style
