= Rotha (house) =

Heritage-listed house in Melbourne, Victoria, Australia

- Location of the house in Greater Metropolitan Melbourne

General information
- Status: Completed
- Type: House
- Architectural style: Federation Queen Anne (Revival) (early)
- Location: 29 Harcourt Street, Hawthorn East, City of Boroondara, Melbourne, Victoria, Australia
- Coordinates: 37°49′04″S 145°03′04″E
- Completed: 1888; 138 years ago
- Owner: John Beswicke and family (1887–1980)

Technical details
- Material: Red bricks; slate; timber; cast iron

Design and construction
- Architect: John Beswicke

Victorian Heritage Register
- Official name: Rotha
- Type: Registered place
- Designated: 5 May 1982
- Reference no.: VHR H0510
- Heritage overlay no.: HO54
- Categories: Residential buildings (private); Education

Register of the National Estate
- Official name: Rotha and Garden
- Type: Defunct register
- Designated: 30 June 1992
- Reference no.: 9419

Rotha is a house located at 29 Harcourt Street in Hawthorn East, in the City of Boroondara, in the inner eastern suburbs of Melbourne, in Victoria, Australia.

Built in 1888 on the traditional lands of the Wurundjeri people, the house was added to the Victorian Heritage Register on 5 May 1982 in recognition of its historical and architectural significance; and was also added to the non-statutory and now defunct Register of the National Estate on 30 June 1992.

== Description ==
Rotha was designed by the notable nineteenth century architect John Beswicke as his own residence. The house, built between 1887 and 1888, is two-storey red-brick and includes design features which anticipate the Australian Federation Queen Anne (Revival) style popularised at the turn of the century. A single-storey ballroom was added to the east of the house prior to 1902. Rotha is one of eleven two-storey houses in deep gardens built in Harcourt Street by Beswicke in a speculative venture with his father, Charles, between the years 1873 and 1900, one of the early squatters in the Port Phillip District. The styles of each of the eleven houses varied and include Queen Anne Revival, Victorian Tudor and Victorian Italianate and they were progressively lived in by members of the family and then sold.

Rotha is the most unconventional of these houses and its eclecticism is a consequence of three factors: that it was to be Beswicke's own residence and so he was not constrained in his expression and experimented with the unconventional; experimentation was endemic in this period in Melbourne; and the late 1880s saw the beginning of the Picturesque movement in architecture in Melbourne. Beswicke was a prolific architect and amongst his designs are the town halls for the various municipalities of Brighton, Hawthorn, Malvern, and Dandenong, various church buildings, as well as a large number of commercial buildings and residences in the suburban and inner city areas of Melbourne.

The Beswicke family occupied Rotha until 1980, when Beswicke's son, Rupert, died. Prior to that date, the house had retained in contents from the late nineteenth and twentieth centuries.

The design of the house is asymmetrical and includes an eclectic assortment of detailing including both hipped and picturesque gable slate roofs, a polygonal corner turret with bell cast candle-snuffer roof, banded depressed Gothic Revival arches over some of the windows, a square panelled verandah frieze framed in timber with turned drops and an extraordinary central polygonal bay with a modelled brick chimney stack at the front and three radiating Gothic gables heavily decorated in timber fretwork. There is a central recessed entry porch between the bay window faced drawing room on one side and the polygonal corner bay window of the dining room. The front door opens directly into a double-storey hall which contains a U-shaped staircase. The bottom of the stair curves into the hall while at landing level it divides into two flights; one continuing to the rear bedrooms and the other to the front of the building. A balcony over the recessed entry porch opens off the stairwell at first floor level.

To the rear of the house are the kitchen, what was originally the servants' dining room and other service rooms. The ground floor contains four main rooms, kitchen and service rooms. The first floor originally had five bedrooms and a small bathroom. It was extended over the rear service rooms adding two extra rooms. The house retains some of its original interior decoration. This includes fine timber joinery and doors with entablatures depicting animal scenes, stained glass windows, original wallpapers and painted finishes including woodgraining and stencilling, pressed metal ceilings, original light and curtain fittings, oiled wooden venetian blinds and marble fireplaces. Some of the original wallpapers have been replaced with more modern designs. Much of the remaining original decoration was in good repair, as of 1990. The property retained its timber stables at the rear, gardener's shed, plant nursery and original garden plan with mature plantings. A driveway focuses attention firstly upon the house in its elevated position and secondly upon a small fountain with female figure statue at the centre of the central circular parterre.

== See also ==
- Architecture of Melbourne
- List of places on the Victorian Heritage Register in the City of Boroondara
