= Oakden, Addison and Kemp =

Australian architectural firm

- Type: Partnership
- Industry: Architecture
- Predecessor: Terry and Oakden
- Founded: 1887; 139 years ago in Melbourne, Victoria, Australia
- Founders: Percy Oakden; George Addison; Henry Kemp
- Defunct: 1896
- Fate: Dissolved
- Successor: Oakden and Ballantyne

Oakden, Addison and Kemp was an Australian architectural firm in Melbourne, Victoria. While it was short lived, existing from only 1887 to 1892, they designed a number of outstanding projects, and all three members designed many more notable projects separately, and in earlier and later partnerships.

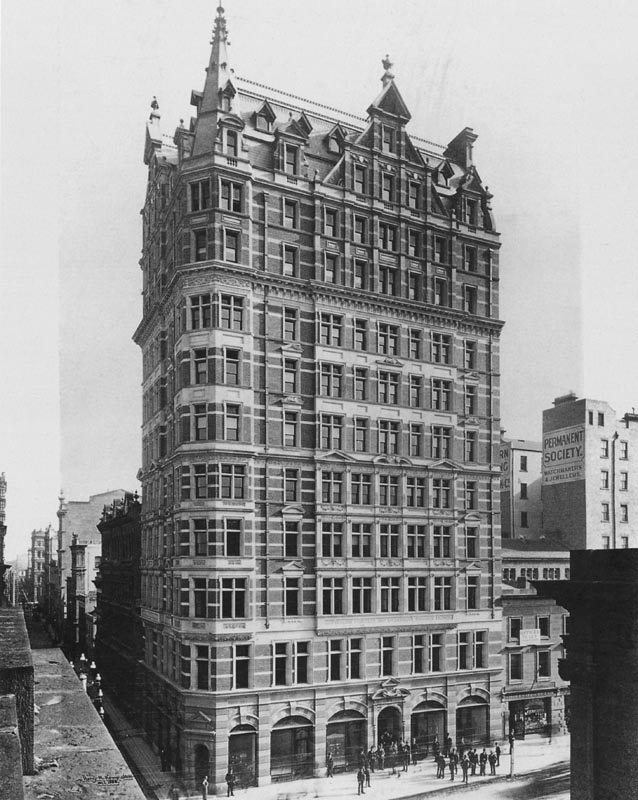
The APA Building, tallest in Australia in 1890

The firm had its beginnings as Terry & Oakden, a partnership between the older and architect prolific Leonard Terry (1825-1884) and architect Percy Oakden (1845-1917), which lasted from 1874 until Terry's death in 1884. In 1885 George Henry Male Addison joined to create Terry Oakden & Addison, and in 1887 Henry Hardie Kemp joined, creating Oakden, Addison & Kemp.

One of the earliest projects of the partnership was North Park, a large mansion for Alex McCracken, of McCracken's Brewery, completed in 1888, which was amongst Melbourne's first examples of the Queen Anne style. The South Australian Insurance building completed the same year in Collins Street, part of the Rialto / Olderfleet group, is an interesting essay in the Gothic revival, with elements in the rarely used material, architectural terra cotta. Another large project of that busy year was the Queens (or Carlton) Coffee Palace on the corner of Rathdowne Street and Victoria Street, overlooking the Carlton Gardens, in an exuberant style described as German Renaissance. The building never opened as a hotel, instead eventually become apartments, then a Catholic women's hostel, before being demolished c1970. Their broadly Queen Anne design for the 1889 London Chartered Bank in Queens Parade, Fitzroy North, is a local landmark, its three storey restrained red brick form accentuated by a conical roof. That same year they designed Alton, a large house on the slopes of Mt Macedon, in a style that has been described as Arts & Crafts, and notable for the first floor walling of hung terra cotta tiles.

The firm also took on the design of a massive project, the 12 storey Australian Property Investment Co. Building (together with John Beswicke) in Elizabeth Street, amongst the tallest in the world in 1889. Later known as the APA building, it was Australia's tallest building until 1912, and Melbourne's tallest until 1929. It was also designed in the new Queen Anne fashion, the tall spikes and spires of the roof adding to its verticality.

The next year they designed the more conventional, but still tall, premises for the YMCA headquarters, with its mansard roofs and internal hall. The YMCA never occupied it, due to the financial crash of the 1890s, which also curtailed the work of the firm.

Addison had started a Brisbane branch in about 1886, and designed separately after 1888 though under the name of the firm, and was responsible for a series of designs that are still landmarks in Brisbane. He left the partnership to establish his own practice there in 1892, the Melbourne firm becoming Oakden & Kemp. This firm lasted a few more years during the depression, by after Kemp moved to Sydney in 1895, the partnership was dissolved in 1896. Kemp later returned to Melbourne, and partnered with Beverley Ussher to create Ussher & Kemp in 1899, popularising the local version of the Queen Anne (or Edwardian or Federation) villa with numerous outstanding designs until Ussher died in 1908. In 1900 Oakden took on Cedric Henry Ballantyne to become Oakden & Ballantyne, until Oakden died in 1917.

== List of works ==
=== Percy Oakden ===
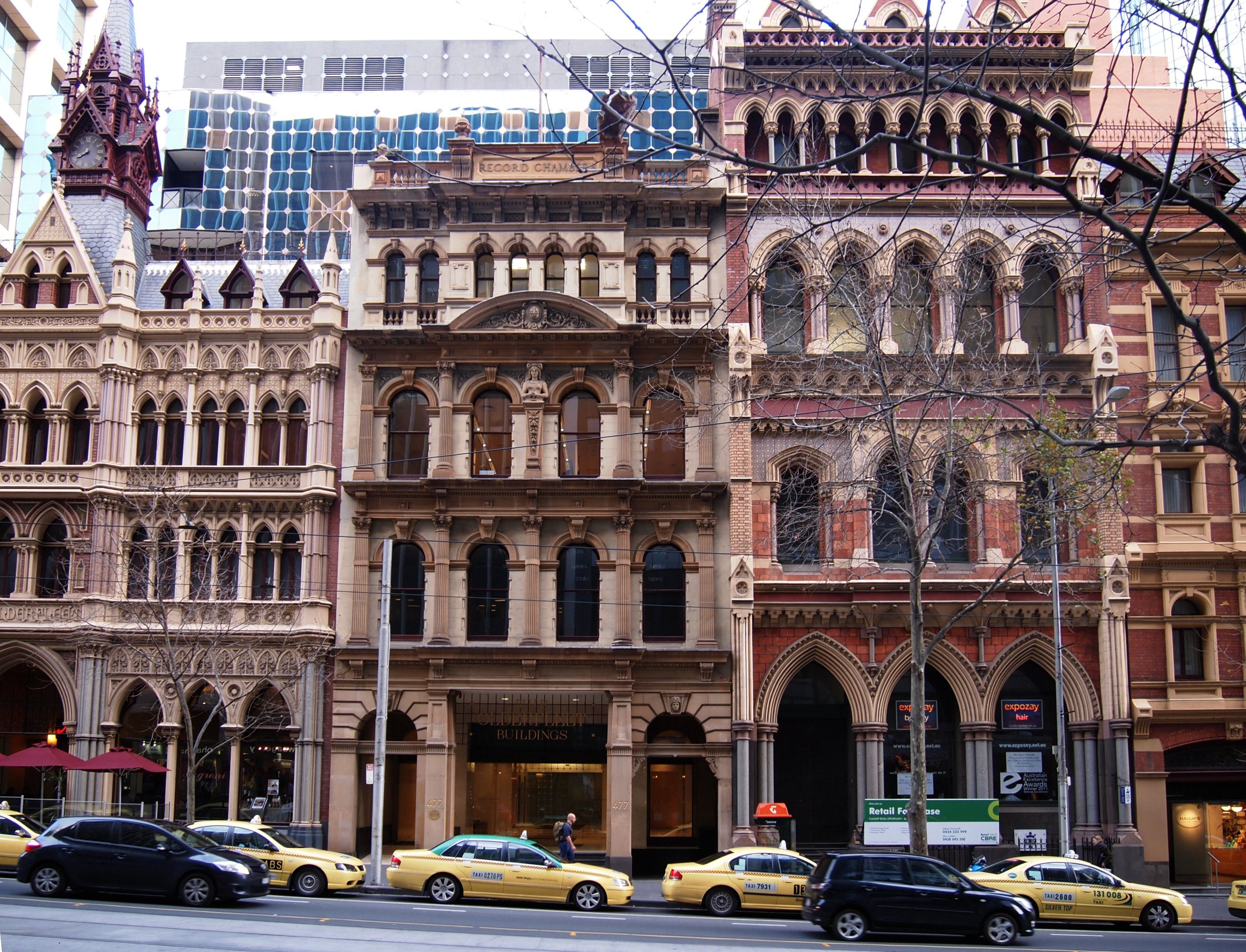
South Australian Insurance, Collins Street (to the right), 1888

- 1870: Ballarat Town Hall, Sturt Street, Ballarat (Oakden merged the competition winning exterior by JJ Lorenz, and interior by HR Caselli)
- 1872: Wesleyan Church, Sydney Road, Brunswick
- 1873: Clunes Town Hall and Court House, Bailey Street, Clunes
- 1887: St Albans Village Plan Precinct, Victoria and Albert Crescents, St Albans

=== Terry & Oakden ===
- 1874: Former Methodist Church, Church Street, Fitzroy North
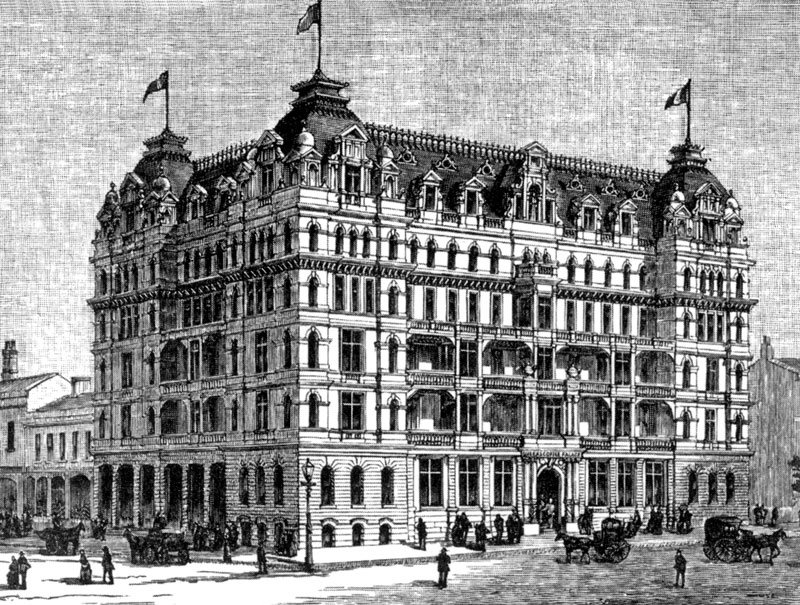
  Queens Coffee Palace, Carlton, 1888
- 1875: Former ES&A Bank, 49-51 Reid Street, Wangaratta.
- 1876: Ercildoune, Napier Street, Footscray
- 1880: Former ES&A Bank, Clarendon Street, South Melbourne
- 1881: Front addition to town house, Gipps Street, East Melbourne
- 1883: Francis Ormond Building, Workingmen's College (first stage), La Trobe Street, Melbourne
- 1884: Former ES&A Bank, Alexander Road, Ascot Vale
- 1887: Queen's College, Melbourne

=== Oakden, Addison & Kemp ===
- 1887: Former Wesleyan Church and Manse, 21 -23 Highbury Grove, Kew
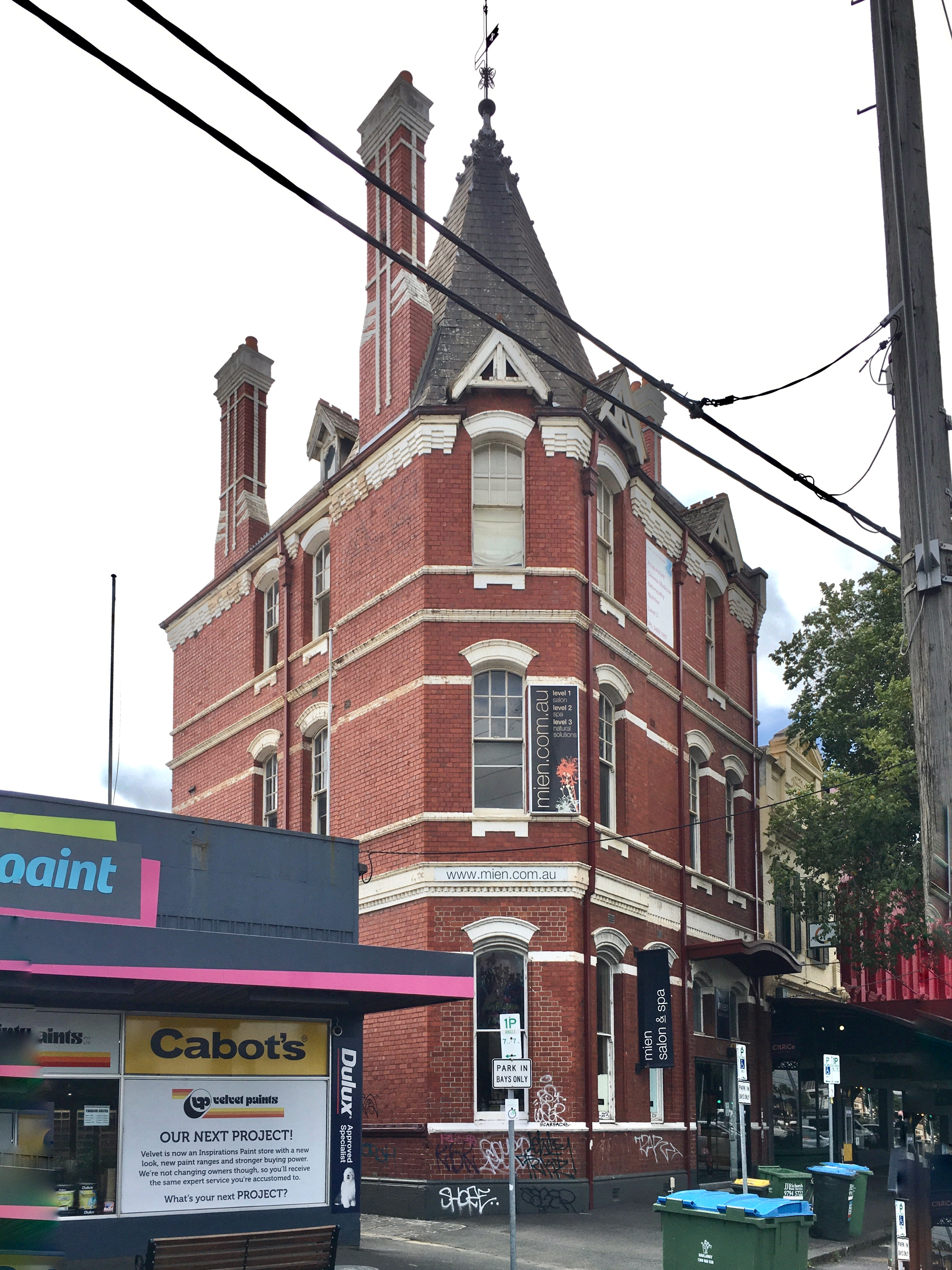
- Former London Chartered Bank, Queens Parade, 1889
  1888: Grosvenor Chambers, 9 Collins Street, Melbourne
- 1888: North Park (later Woodlands), Woodland Street, Essendon
- 1888: South Australian Insurance Building (originally New Zealand Chambers), Collins Street, Melbourne
- 1888: Wesleyan Church, Hesse Street, Queenscliff
- 1888: Manse, former Wesleyan Church, 21 -23 Highbury Grove Kew.
- 1888: Queens / Carlton Coffee Palace, Rathdowne Street, Carlton. (demolished c1970)
- c1888: Former London Chartered Bank, High Street, Northcote
- 1889: Former London Chartered Bank, Napier Street, St Arnaud
- 1889: Former London Chartered Bank, 370-74 Queens Parade, Fitzroy North
- 1889: Former London Chartered Bank, 71 Wellington Street, Kerang
- 1889: Thomas Gaggin House, Alma Road, Camberwell
- 1889: Dr Thomas Rowan House (Alton), Alton Road, Mount Macedon (destroyed by fire 1983)
- 1890: Australian Property Investment Co. Building, Elizabeth Street, Melbourne (with John Beswicke, demolished 1980)
- 1890: Former YMCA (now Salvation Army Temple), Bourke Street, Melbourne (with Billings & Son)
- 1890: Terrace House, 16 Jolimont Terrace, East Melbourne
- 1890: Workshops, Workingmen's College, Bowen Street, Melbourne (now Building 4, RMIT)
- 1890: Former Wesleyan Methodist Church, Cardigan Place, Albert Park (now part of Albert Park Primary School)
- 1892: Francis Ormond Building, Workingmen's College (second stage), La Trobe Street, Melbourne

=== Oakden & Ballantyne ===
- 1901: Ivanhoe Metropolitan Fire Station, Upper Heidelberg Road, Ivanhoe
- 1901: The Wilderness Homestead Second House, Wilderness Road, Gritjurk
- 1910: Hawthorn Fire Station, William Street, Hawthorn
- 1910: New Zealand Loan and Mercantile Agency Company Building, Collins Street, Melbourne
