= Cullymont =

Heritage-listed house in Melbourne, Victoria, Australia

- Location of the house in Greater Metropolitan Melbourne

General information
- Status: Completed
- Type: House
- Architectural style: Victorian Italianate
- Location: 4 Selwyn Street, Canterbury, City of Boroondara, Melbourne, Victoria, Australia
- Coordinates: 37°49′48″S 145°05′01″E
- Completed: February 1890; 136 years ago

Technical details
- Material: Stuccoed bricks

Design and construction
- Architect: John Beswicke

Victorian Heritage Register
- Official name: Cullymont
- Type: Registered place
- Designated: 26 September 1990
- Reference no.: VHR H0811
- Heritage overlay no.: HO119
- Category: Residential buildings (private)

Cullymont is a house located at 4 Selwyn Street in Canterbury, in the City of Boroondara, in the inner eastern suburbs of Melbourne, in Victoria, Australia.

Built in 1890 on the traditional lands of the Wurundjeri people, the house was added to the Victorian Heritage Register on 26 September 1990 in recognition of its historical and architectural significance; and, together with Eyre Court on 2 Molesworth Street, was also added to a non-statutory list by the Victorian branch of the National Trust on 18 June 1990.

== History ==
Following the extension of the railway to the Lilydale station, completed in 1882, increasing suburbanisation of Canterbury and its surrounding neighbourhoods occurred. The villa known as Cullymont was completed in February 1890 a country residence for the Rev. Alexander McCully, an Irish Protestant clergyman and professor of elocution, and his growing family. Built at the same time and located adjacent to Cullymont was its pair, Eyre Court, built for Rev. McCully's father, John James McCully, a public servant. However, the McCully's residency was short-lived as John McCully failed to pay his debts to his son, the Rev. McCully, and his wife, who had both relocated to Brisbane, and were declared insolvent in 1898.

In May 1906, the house was listed for auction, and the household furniture was auctioned the following year. At auction, the house was described as:

"CULLYMONT," SELWYN-STREET, CANTERBURY, Most Substantially Built Two-Storied Brick Balconied RESIDENCE. Containing 9 Rooms, Laundry, Bath, Many Pantries, Presses, &c. In the Grounds is a Three-Roomed Brick Cottage, Man's Room and Stable. The Land, about 238 Ft. to Selwyn-strcet by a Varying Depth of 172 Ft. to 128.6 Ft., is Well Laid Out in Garden and Shrubbery. The Position is Unsurpassed. Close to the Station and Commanding a Magnificent Country View.

— Auction notice, The Age, 5 May 1906.

Other residents of Cullmont included Mrs John Bartholomew, in 1895; Edward James Goode, a storekeeper of the Victorian Railway Department, and his family, in 1904–1905; Richard Taylor, in November 1906; and William and Catherine Gates, from 1915 until at least 1925.

== Description ==
Cullymont and Eyrecourt comprise what may be Victoria's largest semi-detached pair, with a common (shared) wall. Both designed by John Beswicke and constructed in the Victorian Italianate style of stuccoed brick, this near intact and fully articulated example is distinguished by its unusual form, its two-level arcades, a dividing tower and its splendid interior. The house consists of two opposing wings, each of two-storeys with bays, and an arcaded verandah extending on two levels between the bayed wings. A parapeted tower divides the two villas at the apex. The original owner's coat of arms survives as features on the tower, the gates and on keystones over the main windows, as do also leadlight fanlights depicting Shakespearian characters over the front door.

The rare joined form of the terrace directly expresses both the former dual occupancy and, by the coat of arms on the tower gates with its clan motto Viet Animo (By strength and Courage), recalls the McCully family occupancy. Grand gates mark the entrances to both houses, facing both Molesworth Street and Selwyn Street.

As part of the development of Cullymont, six single-fronted Victorian cottages, at the west end of McGregor Street, housed the workers for Cullymont. Built in stages, Number 27 was completed in 1892 and has the Cullymont crest included in its iron lacework; Number 29, a semi-detached cottage with Number 31, both completed in 1894 and located on the corner of Short Street, was featured in an edition of Home Beautiful; and the row was completed in 1898. The houses were renovated and extended over time to accommodate changes in housing standards. With their picket fences and front verandahs, the cottages provide a charming streetscape in this quiet cul-de-sac.

== See also ==
- Architecture of Melbourne
- Eyre Court, Canterbury
- List of places on the Victorian Heritage Register in the City of Boroondara
