= APA Building, Melbourne =

Coordinates: 37°49′2″S 144°57′51″E

APA Building
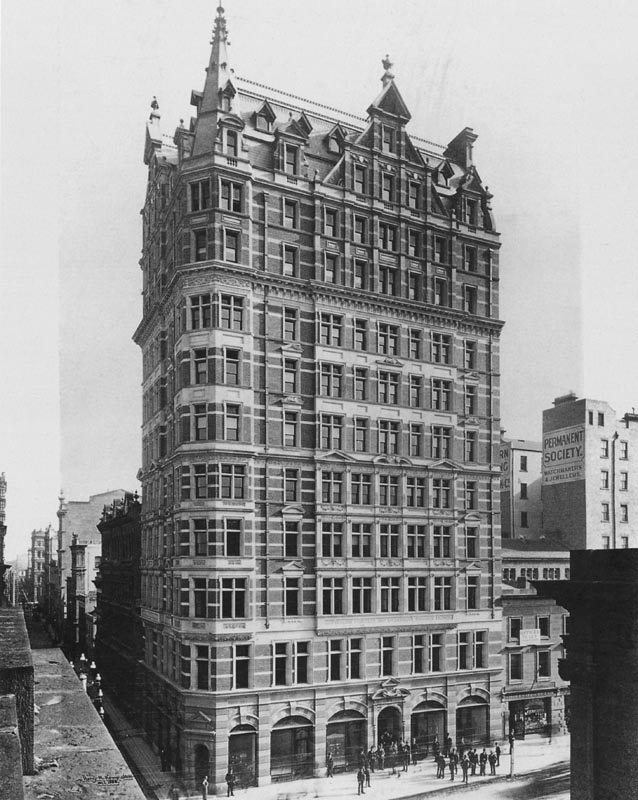
- Photographed soon after completion

General information
- Type: Office
- Location: Cnr of Elizabeth Street & Flinders Lane, Melbourne, Victoria, Australia
- Completed: 1890
- Demolished: 1980

Height
- Antenna spire: 53 metres
- Roof: 47 metres

Technical details
- Floor count: 12

Design and construction
- Architect: Oakden, Addison & Kemp with John Beswicke

The APA Building, also known as the API Building and the Australian Building, was an early skyscraper in Melbourne, Victoria, Australia; at 12 storeys and 53m to the tip of its corner spire, it became the Australia's tallest commercial building at the time of its completion in 1890 (and remained so for decades). It was later reputed (erroneously) to have been the world's tallest at the time.

The building was located at 49 Elizabeth Street, on the corner of Flinders Lane in Melbourne, and was notable for the way the Queen Anne style design lent it very vertical proportions, enhanced by the steep roof, spires and gables of the top floors. In 1912, its height to roof was surpassed by Sydney's 50.25 metre Culwulla Chambers, though still taller when counting its spire. It remained Melbourne's tallest until 1929.

Despite a heritage listing, Heritage Victoria granted a permit to the owners for its demolition in 1980 to make way for a nondescript five storey concrete and glass office building with ground floor retail.

== History ==
=== Design and construction ===
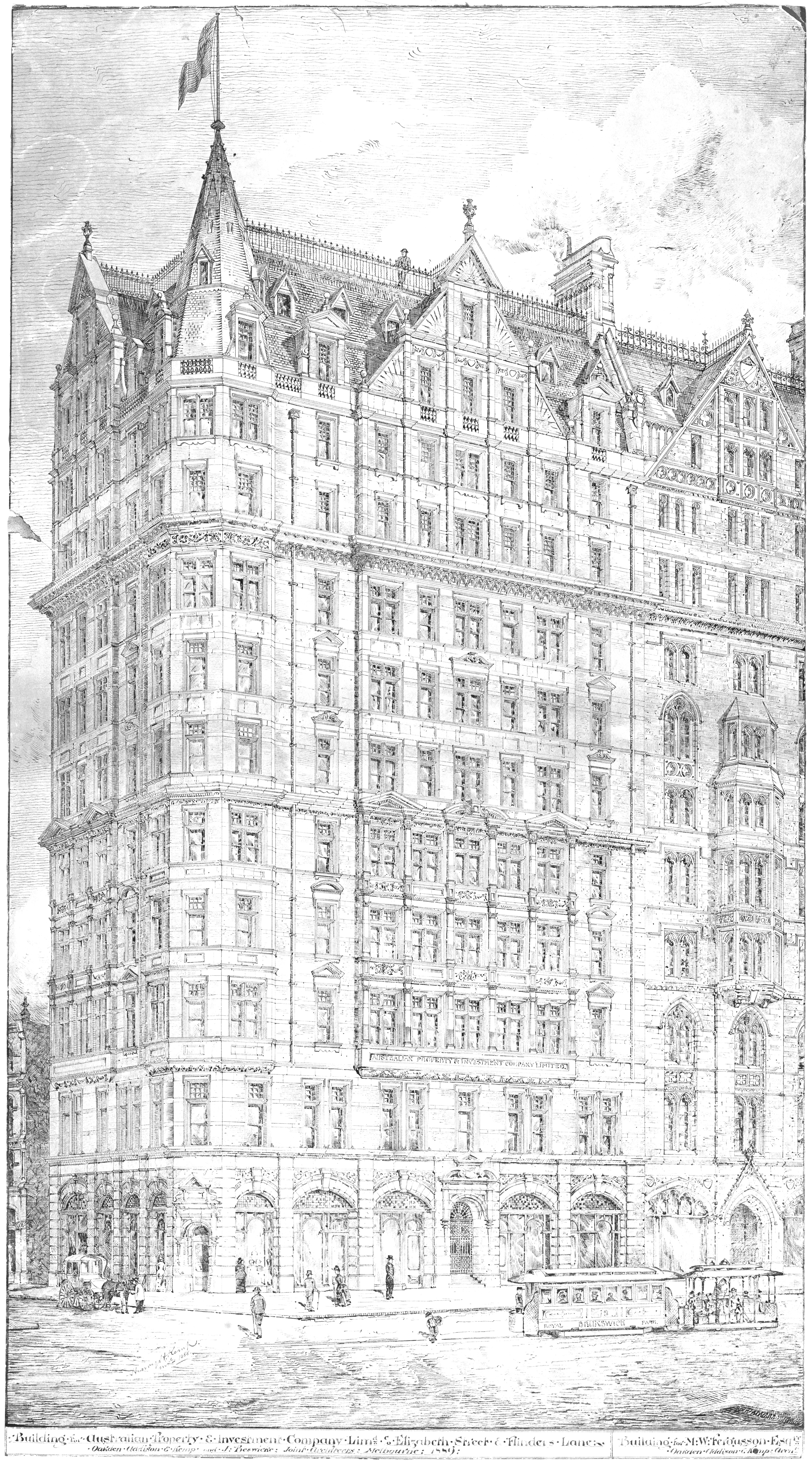
Sketch of design signed by architect H H Kemp, November 1888.

In the 1880s, Melbourne was affected by a land boom, fuelled by easy credit and steep increases in the price of land, especially in the central city. The project that was to become the tallest in Melbourne was developed by the Australian Property and Investment Company (API), set up in the early 1880s to buy and build properties, mainly in the city area. Directors of the company in the late 1880s included businessmen who were also politicians, notably F T Derham (MLA and Postmaster-General), Alfred Deakin (MLA and Chief Secretary), and James Munro (MLA and Premier in late 1890). The API paid a reported £65,000 for the site, and then borrowed London-based Home and Colonial 'debentures' to fund the construction, estimated at £80,000.

The API called a limited competition in November 1887, which was won by Henry Hardie Kemp. At the time, he had just been taken on as a partner, along with another senior architect, at the old established firm of Terry & Oakden, forming Oakden, Addison & Kemp in that year. John Beswicke, who had worked for one of the API directors previously, had also been invited to submit, and was retained as an associate on the project as he had studied tall buildings, and is thought to have provided technical advice. The announcement of the construction noted that it was to be 173ft (53m) said to be taller than any private building in London at the time, and would stand amongst the tallest in New York City and Chicago. It was reputed to have been originally planned to have fifteen stories (and an 1888 sketch shows an equally-large building in the same style next door), but it was built with 12 levels, the 12th one attic space and a caretaker's flat. Construction began in 1888, and was completed by late 1890 when various tenants had moved in.

The APA Building was constructed by local builder James Anderson, who was a prominent member of The Builders and Contractors Association of Victoria. He built many notable buildings in Melbourne, including the Hawthorn Town Hall, which still stands.

The Australian Building was one of about 11 "massive edifices" of 8 to 10 floors built in the city at the height of the boom, of which only two survive. They were made possible by the introduction in 1889 of a hydraulic power system of pressurised water that could operate the lifts to great heights "in complete safety". They did not employ any new structural technologies, relying on thick walls of load bearing brickwork, and internal structures of brick, cast iron, wrought iron and timber. With the boom soon turning into a crash, these buildings remained the tallest for many years, and in 1916 a new building regulation was passed limiting buildings to 40 metres (130 ft).

A worker was killed by a falling plank during construction in 1890.

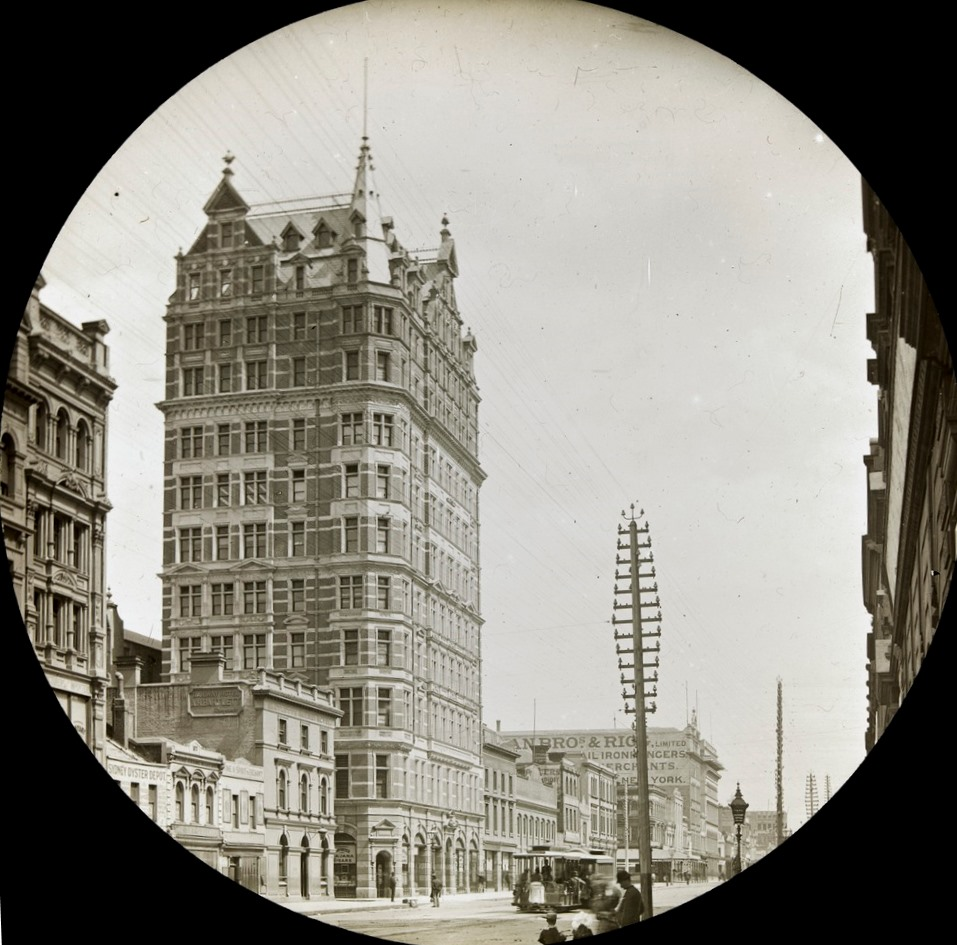
Viewed from the south in c.1890

The building inevitably generated its own legends. For instance, that three companies went broke, sinking the 40-metre-deep cylinders for the hydraulic lift poles, and that not long after completion, the bolt on one of the cylinders broke, sending the fortunately vacant lift speeding downwards. Another from 1945 is that on the day of official inspection, the lift shot up uncontrollably only to bounce back from springs at the top, prompting many of the party to use the stairs on the way down. A myth circulated that it was the world's tallest building in 1890, but there were a number of towers in New York City and Chicago in that year that exceeded it in height.

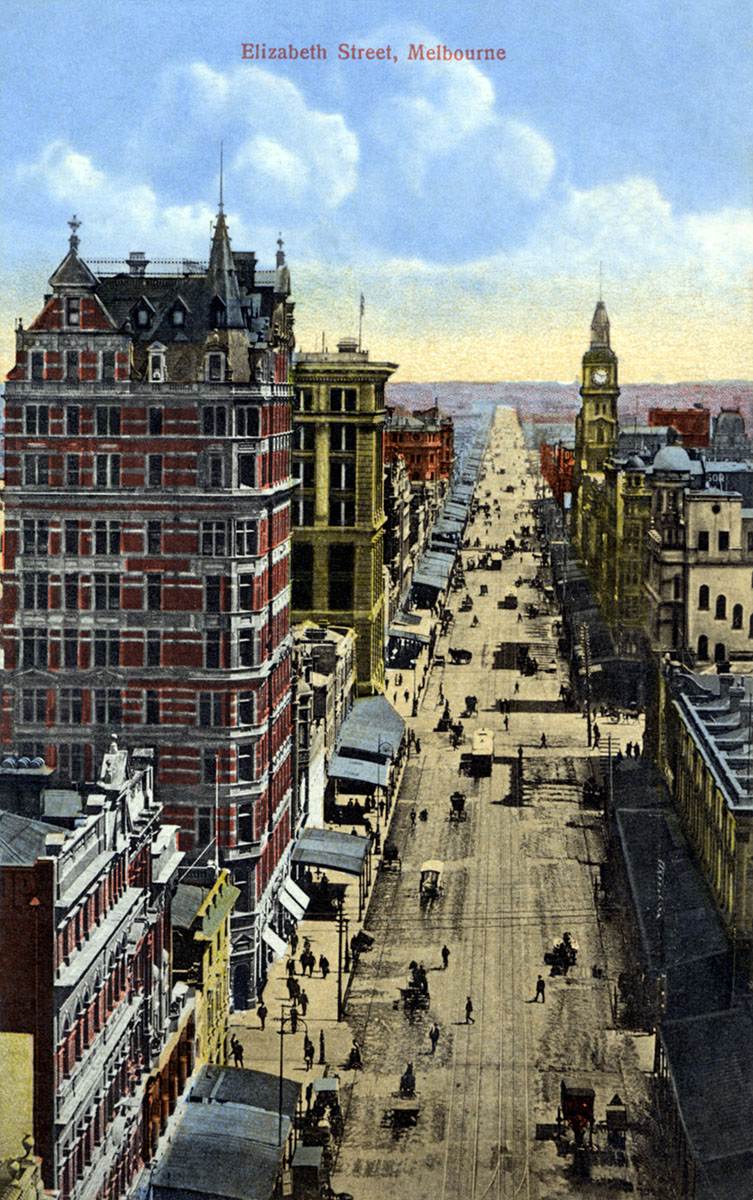
1910 postcard of the view from the newly completed Flinders Street Station clock tower looking north up Elizabeth Street. The Australian Building (left) still dominated the skyline.

Its great height and dominance in the streetscape led to it being the subject of many photographs and postcards in its first 20 years.

It was built at the peak of real estate boom, and by the time it was completed land values had begun the fall. In July 1890 it was decided that all the API should be amalgamated with the Real Estate Bank, a company of which Munro was the Chair. In 1892 the Real Estate Bank went into liquidation, revealing that the debts of the API amounted to £400,000, and rents could not cover the mortgages.

=== Australian Provincial Assurance Association ===
In 1920, the Australian Provincial Assurance Association, a Sydney-based insurance company, bought the building as its Melbourne base, and then renamed it the APA Building.

The APA Building was Australia's tallest building to the roof until 1912, when the Culwulla Chambers at 50.25 metres (164.9 ft) was completed in Sydney; however, the APA Building's corner spire at 53 metres (174 ft) was still slightly taller.

The APA Building was Melbourne's tallest commercial building for 40 years, until the company decided to move, purchasing and remodelling a nine-storey high-rise built in 1890 on the southeast corner of Collins and Queen Streets as its new headquarters, adding a tall tower (largely for show) in 1929, which topped out at 76 metres (249 ft). This was also known as the APA Building, and was demolished in the late 1960s.

In the 1950s, the spire, turrets and gables of the top floors of the APA building were removed, leaving it with a truncated mansard roof.

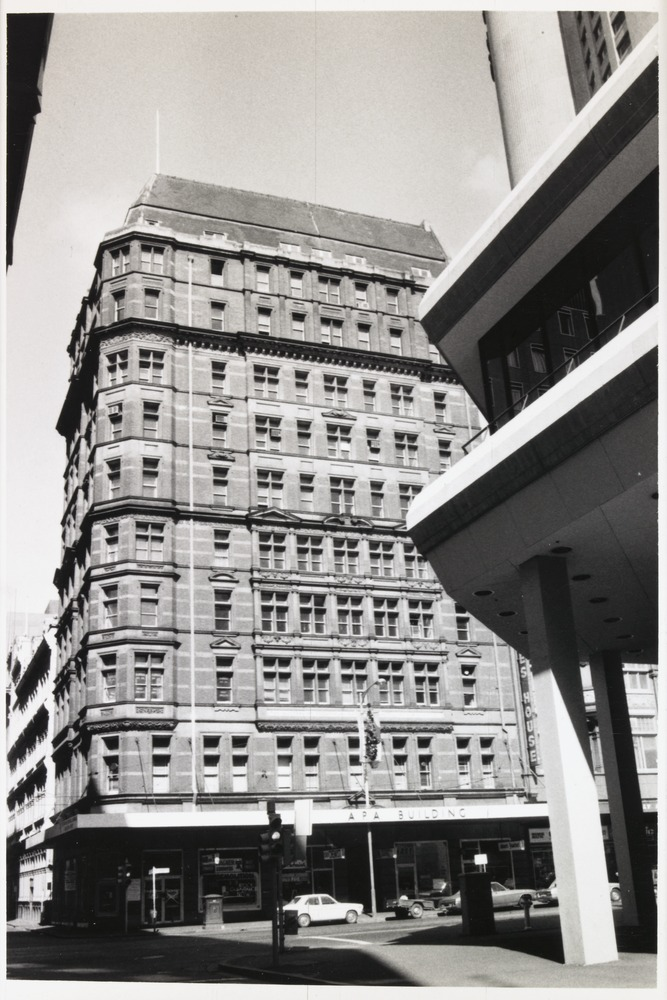
Pictured in 1978 after the removal of the rooftop details including gables, spire, dormers windows, chimneys and iron cresting.

== Demolition ==
By the late 1970s, its historic importance was recognised despite its alteration, and it was classified by the National Trust in 1978. It was also listed by the State Government Historic Buildings Preservation Council (now Heritage Victoria), but the owners successfully argued for a demolition permit, on the basis of the large cost of upgrading to meet modern fire regulations. It was demolished in mid 1980, and replaced by a five-storey concrete and glass office building with ground floor retail.

The untidy demolition of the APA Building left a small section of its banded brick façade attached to the neighbouring former Melbourne Sports Depot building, in which the original string courses of the building's second to fifth floors can still be seen including the first of its three original cornices.

== Claims to height ==
The APA Building has been variously claimed to be the tallest in the world (for instance in the 1976 book Melbourne's Yesterdays), or the third or fourth tallest, when in fact it was perhaps a distant seventh or more in 1890. Measured drawings held at the State Library of Victoria from 1980 show that it had 11 floors, and a 12th attic floor with a caretakers flat, while plans reproduced in a thesis at the University of Melbourne show it had a roof height at the 11th floor at 41.5m, roof height of the top attic floor of 47m, and to the top of the spire was 51m. This is lower than a number of buildings in New York City and Chicago, built in that year or earlier.

In New York, the long demolished New York World Building was also completed in late 1890, and with 13 floors plus a domed tower containing 6 more floors reaching as high as 94 metres (308 ft) was by far the tallest in the world at that time. Others already completed were also taller, including the 12-storey Washington Building of 1887, which was 67 metres (220 ft) to the roof, plus attic and cupola; the 13-storey New York Times Building by George B Post was 57.3 metres (188 ft) to the top of its spire; and the adjacent 11-storey Potter Building completed in 1885 was 50.3 metres (165 ft) to the top of the roof, with pinnacles on top of that. In Chicago, the tower portion of the 1889 Auditorium Building was the tallest in the city at 17 storeys and 72 metres (236 ft), while the 12-storey Rookery Building, completed in 1888, was 55 metres (180 ft) to the roof.

The APA was only amongst these tallest in the world for a short time, as towers in Chicago and New York continued to climb higher. In 1891 the Monadnock Building in Chicago reached 60 metres (200 ft) over 16 floors, and is the tallest office building ever built using load bearing brick, like the APA.

== See also ==
- Architecture of Melbourne
- List of tallest structures built before the 20th century
