= Eyre Court, Canterbury =

Heritage-listed house in Melbourne, Victoria, Australia

Eyre Court
- Location of the house in Greater Metropolitan Melbourne
- Alternative names: Eyrecourt

General information
- Status: Completed
- Type: House
- Architectural style: Victorian Italianate
- Location: 2 Molesworth Street, Canterbury, City of Boroondara, Melbourne, Victoria, Australia
- Coordinates: 37°49′48″S 145°05′00″E
- Completed: February 1890; 136 years ago

Technical details
- Material: Stuccoed bricks

Design and construction
- Architect: John Beswicke

Victorian Heritage Register
- Official name: Eyre Court
- Type: Registered place
- Designated: 26 September 1990
- Reference no.: VHR H0817
- Heritage overlay no.: HO98
- Category: Residential buildings (private)

Eyre Court, sometimes spelled as Eyrecourt, is a house located at 2 Molesworth Street (Note: A house of the same name existed from c. 1900s, located on Riversdale Road, Hawthorn, less than two kilometres (one mile) from this house; and other properties of the same name were subsequently built in the Melbourne suburbs of Berwick and Toorak.) in Canterbury, in the City of Boroondara, in the inner eastern suburbs of Melbourne, in Victoria, Australia.

Built in 1890 on the traditional lands of the Wurundjeri people, the house was added to the Victorian Heritage Register on 26 September 1990 in recognition of its historical and architectural significance; and, together with Cullymont on 4 Selwyn Street, was also added to a non-statutory list by the Victorian branch of the National Trust on 18 June 1990.

== History ==
Following the extension of the railway to the Lilydale station, completed in 1882, increasing suburbanisation of Canterbury and its surrounding neighbourhoods occurred. The villa known as Eyre Court was completed in February 1890, a country residence for John James McCully, a public servant. Built at the same time and located adjacent to Eyre Court was its pair Cullymont, built for his son, the Rev. Alexander McCully, an Irish Protestant clergyman and professor of elocution. However, the McCully's residency was short-lived as John McCully failed to pay his debts to his son, the Rev. McCully, and his wife, who had both relocated to Brisbane, and were declared insolvent in 1898.

Other residents of Eyre Court included Walter Macnicol, the secretary of the Silverton Tramway Company, and his family, from c. 1897 to 1907; and Mrs Ella Louisa Jensen, in 1936 until 1947, with the majority of her estate gifted to her mother-in-law, Mrs Elizabeth Maud Jensen, who demolished the original stables and built a house for herself on Leeds Street.

== Description ==
Cullymont and Eyrecourt comprise what may be Victoria's largest semi-detached pair, with a common (shared) wall. Both designed by John Beswicke and constructed in the Victorian Italianate style of stuccoed brick, this near intact and fully articulated example is distinguished by its unusual form, its two-level arcades, a dividing tower and its splendid interior. The house consists of two opposing wings, each of two-storeys with bays, and an arcaded verandah extending on two levels between the bayed wings. A parapeted tower divides the two villas at the apex. The original owner's coat of arms survives as features on the tower, the gates and on keystones over the main windows, as do also leadlight fanlights depicting Shakespearian characters over the front door.

The rare joined form of the terrace directly expresses both the former dual occupancy and, by the coat of arms on the tower gates with its clan motto Viet Animo (By strength and Courage), recalls the McCully family occupancy. Grand gates mark the entrances to both houses, facing both Molesworth Street and Selwyn Street.

== See also ==
- Architecture of Melbourne
- Cullymont
- List of places on the Victorian Heritage Register in the City of Boroondara
