= Hawthorn Arts Centre =

Arts building in Melbourne, Australia

Coordinates: 37°49′23″S 145°2′10″E

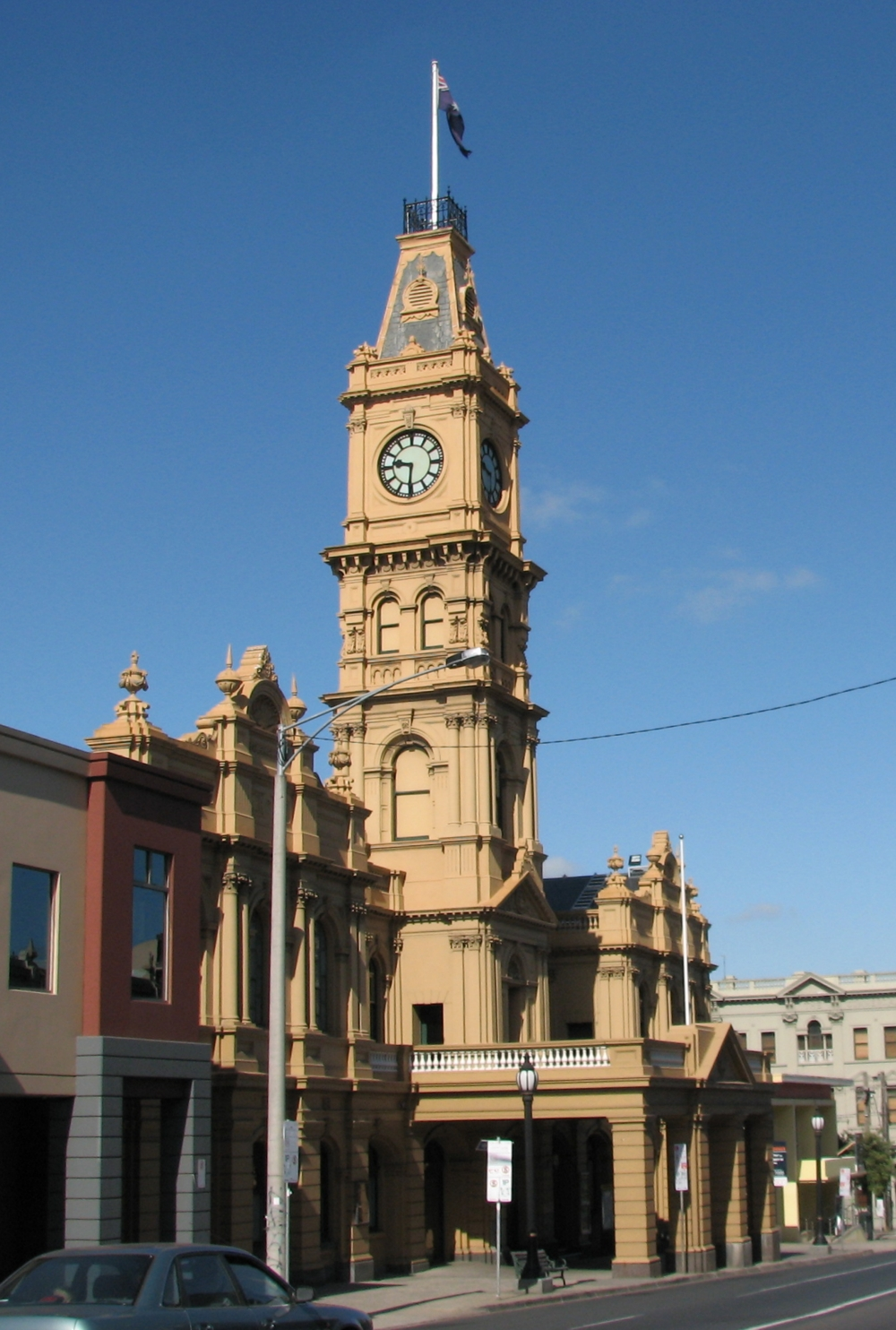
The Town Hall in 2008.

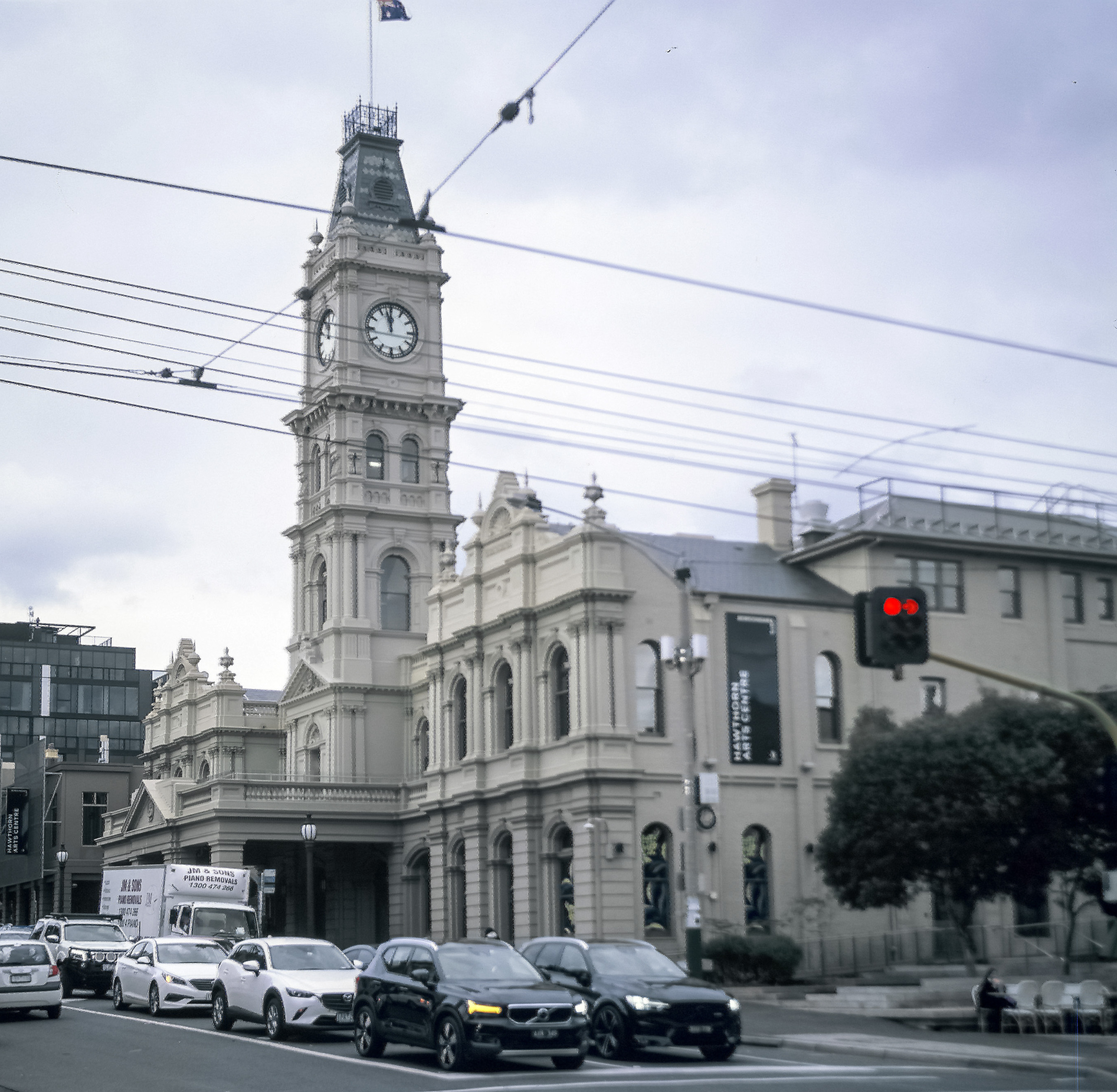
2022 photo

The Hawthorn Arts Centre (formerly the Hawthorn Town Hall) is a former civic building located in Hawthorn, a suburb of Melbourne, Victoria, Australia. Designed by architect John Beswicke in the Second Empire style, the hall was built from 1888 to 1890 and housed the council chambers for the City of Hawthorn. After the City of Hawthorn was dissolved in 1994 and absorbed into the newly created City of Boroondara, the building was used as a library, museum and gallery space. A $17.9 million redevelopment was commenced in April 2012 to convert the former town hall into a regional arts space. The hall was renamed to the Hawthorn Arts Centre and officially opened in November 2013.

== See also ==
- List of town halls in Melbourne
