= Candle snuffer =

Tool for extinguishing candles

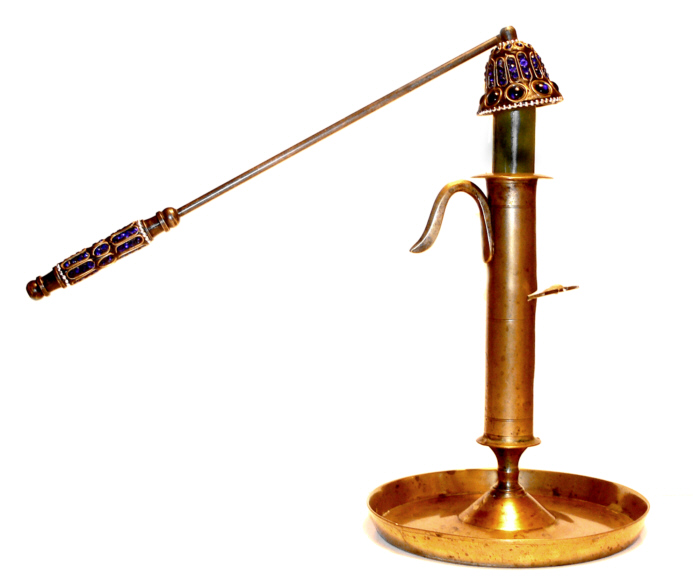
A candle extinguisher in use

A candle snuffer, candle extinguisher, or douter is an instrument used to extinguish burning candles, consisting of a small cone at the end of a handle. The use of a snuffer helps to avoid problems associated with blowing hot wax and it avoids the smoke and odor of a smoldering wick which results from simply blowing a candle out. Extinguishers are still commonly used in homes and churches.

== Description ==
Candle snuffers date from the 17th–mid 19th centuries. Scissor-type tools that cut and retain the snuff trimmed from candle wicks are also sometimes called snuffers, though technically a separate tool called a candle wick trimmer. The snuff being the burnt, surplus portion of the wick. The snuff is partially burned wicks and, with the addition of oxygen, is very flammable, therefore it needed to be isolated so it would not reignite once trimmed from the wick. The simplest and most common form of candle wick trimmer consists of a pair of scissors with an attached box to retain the snuff. The snuff would be smashed into the box so it would not reignite. Many complex forms of these trimming snuffers evolved for the homes with many candles. Some had concentric trap-doors that would snap shut and isolate the snuff. Others would stow the snuff in a lower cavity in the scissors. Similar devices include the douter and the extinguisher.

== Historical usage ==
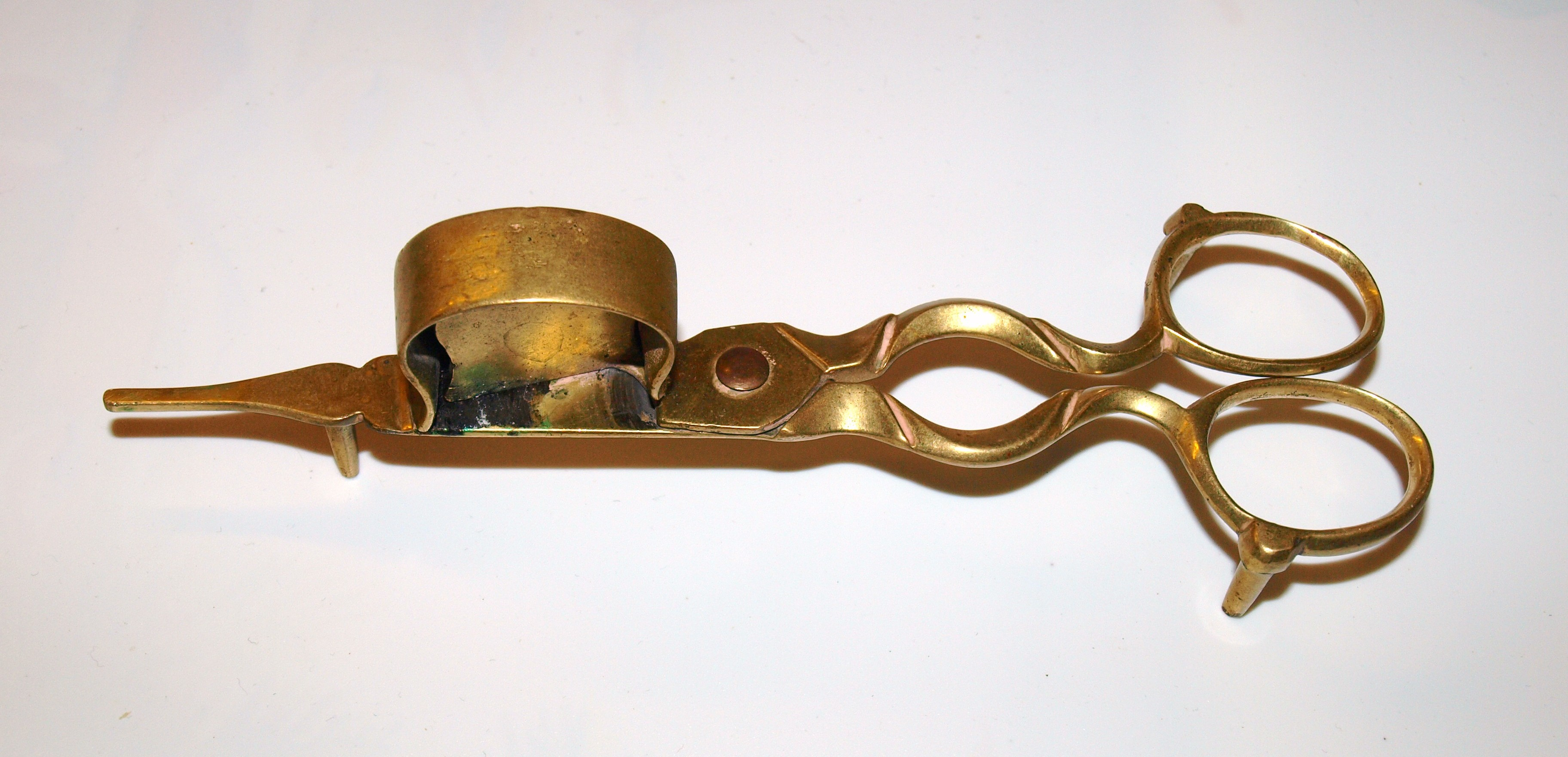
A candle wick trimmer, also sometimes called a snuffer.

Before the mid 19th century, the term snuffer referred to a scissors-like device with two flat blades and an attached snuffer box. This tool was used to trim the wick of a candle without extinguishing the flame, to maintain efficient burning. A small receptacle catches the trimmed bit of wick. They were rendered obsolete by the invention of self-snuffing wicks, which curl out of the flame when charred. This allows excess wick to burn away, preventing the wick from becoming too long.
