= Bulleen Park & Ride bus station =

Bus station in Melbourne, Australia

Bulleen Park & Ride
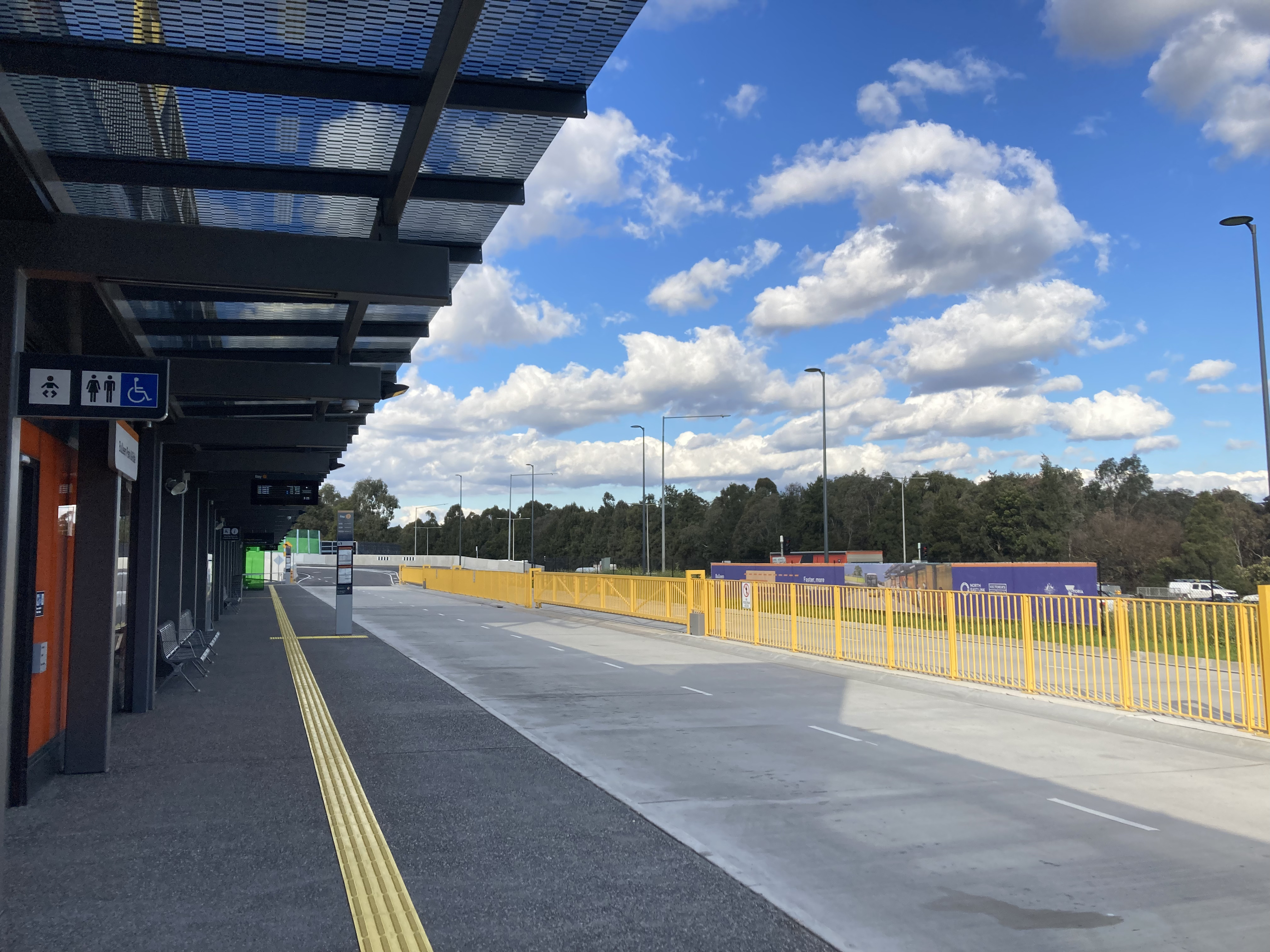
- Bulleen Park & Ride station platform

General information
- Location: Thompsons Road, Bulleen; City of Manningham; Australia
- Coordinates: 37.7792°S 145.0836°E
- System: PTV bus stop
- Owner: Department of Transport and Planning
- Operator: Kinetic Melbourne
- Line: Eastern Busway
- Platforms: 2
- Bus routes: 3

Construction
- Structure type: At-grade
- Parking: 370
- Cycle facilities: Yes
- Accessible: Yes―step free access

Other information
- Station code: Bay 1: 28355; Bay 2: 28356
- Fare zone: Myki zone 1/2
- Website: Stop 28355; Stop 28356

History
- Opened: 30 April 2023

Services
Preceding station	PTV Bus	Following station
Future
Hoddle Street Terminus	Eastern Busway	Doncaster Park and Ride Terminus
Location

Bulleen Park & Ride is an Australian park and ride bus station and future busway station located in Melbourne, suburb of Bulleen and situated next to the Eastern Freeway. It was opened on 30 April 2023 by the Government of Victoria as the first piece of public infrastructure delivered by the North East Link project.

A dedicated busway will be constructed from Doncaster Park & Ride, via this station to Hoddle Street in the city with its own right-of-way. It is expected to be completed by 2028.

== Facilities ==
The park-and-ride includes a multi-level car park for 370 cars, additional quick drop-off and pick-up parking bays, bike parking cages and toilets. The carpark is covered by a 5,000 square metre green roof, with walking and cycling paths connecting to Koonung Creek Trail and Thompsons Road.

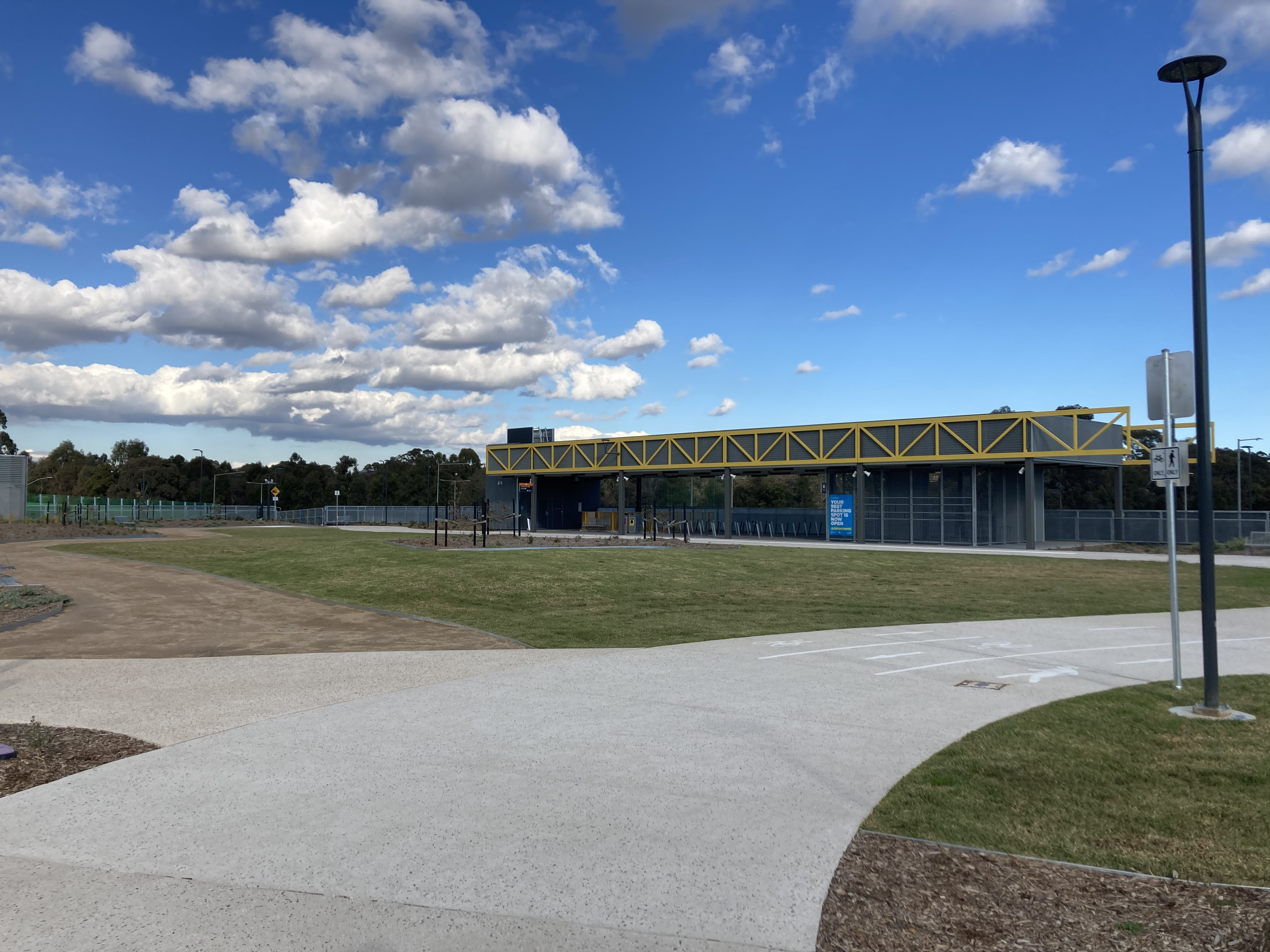
The green roof open space is built on top of the carpark

The station is served bySmartBus route 905, a part of the Doncaster Area Rapid Transit (DART), as well as two other bus routes. All routes via the park and ride runs directly to the CBD via the Eastern Freeway after this station, while route 200 that does not via the freeway only stops on Thompsons Road outside of the station.

As the busway is still under the design and planning phase, an interim design that includes a bus turnaround at the western end of the platforms will be constructed to allow buses to deliver passengers to the stop and return to Thompsons Road. It will be fully integrated with the busway once it has finished construction in 2028.

== History ==
The facility has first been announced in November 2017 as a part of the North East Link project by the Minister for Public Transport, Jacinta Allan. It had been planned for the busway to run along the median in the Eastern Freeway, but has since changed to be built adjacent north of the freeway to better integrate with Bulleen Park & Ride. The Manningham Council had expressed their support for the facility due to its public space inclusion and public transport benefits.

Since construction started in 2021, some residents living next to the building site in Bulleen had their driveways blocked, causing hazards in case of an emergency. Although they supported the project itself, they condemned the lack of consultation and bad planning by the North East Link program committee.

In September 2022, a clash broke out at the construction site where workers were seen punching each other and picking up makeshift weapons. The reason for the fight was unknown, but was speculated to be due to rising tensions between the Construction, Forestry, Maritime, Mining and Energy Union (CFMEU) and Australian Workers' Union (AWU). The fight participants had since been banned from the work site after an investigation.

On 6 April 2023, it was announced that the station will open on 30 April, along with timetable and route changes to bus routes 200, 305, 309 and 905.

The project cost $69 million AUD, and opened on time on 30 April 2023, four years ahead of schedule. It is fast-tracked due to expected impacts to Doncaster Park and Ride, which will be closed during its rebuild for the construction of the busway, and completing the facility early will remove the need for building a temporary park and ride station at the Doncaster interchange.

== Bus routes ==
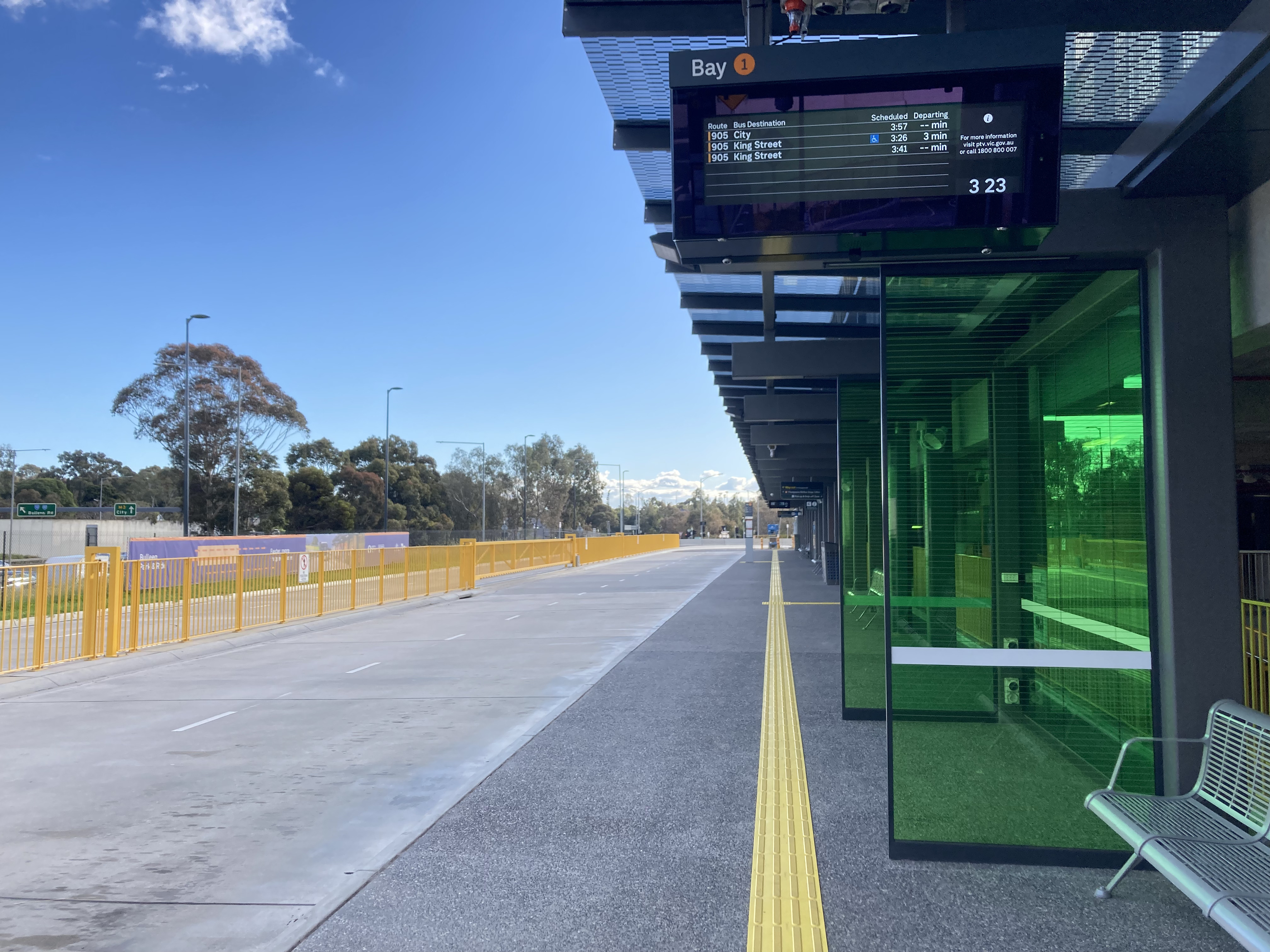
The station platform is equipped with real-time information displays

The station is served by three routes all operated by Kinetic Melbourne, under contract to Public Transport Victoria:
Bay 1 (City-bound):

- 305 : to Melbourne CBD (King Street) (Weekday AM peak only)
- 309 : to Melbourne CBD (Queen Street) (Weekday AM peak only)
- SmartBus 905 : to Melbourne CBD (Lonsdale Street)

Bay 2 (from City):

- 305 : to The Pines Shopping Centre via George Street (Weekday PM peak only)
- 309 : to The Pines Shopping Centre via Reynolds Road (Weekday afternoon only)
- SmartBus 905 : to The Pines Shopping Centre via Porter Street

One additional route stops outside of the facility but does not route through, also operated by Kinetic Melbourne.
Bulleen Park & Ride/Thompsons Road:

- 200 : Melbourne CBD (Queen Street) – Bulleen
