= Doncaster railway line =

Proposed railway line in Melbourne, Victoria, Australia

Coordinates: 37°47′50.55″S 145°07′31.72″E

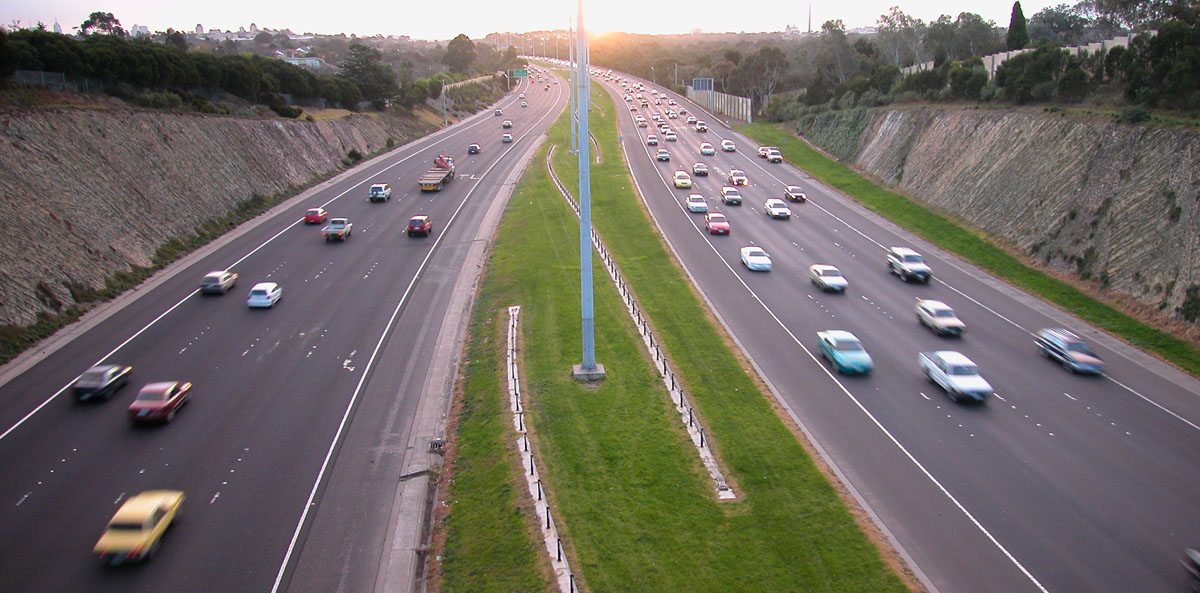
2005 image of the Eastern Freeway looking towards the city, showing the wide median strip allocated for the proposed Doncaster railway line

The Doncaster railway line was a long-proposed suburban railway in the eastern suburbs of Melbourne, Victoria, Australia, that was anticipated to be built by the late 2020s, as a branch, along with the Hurstbridge line, of the planned future Clifton Hill Loop Line, as part of the 2013 PTV Network Development Plan.

The Doncaster line would have primarily served the suburbs of Bulleen, Balwyn North, Kew, Templestowe and Doncaster, running along the median strip of the Eastern Freeway for most of its length.

First proposed in 1890, detailed planning commenced in 1969 and, by 1972, the route had been decided upon. Despite rising costs, the state governments of the period continued to give assurances that the line would be built. Property acquisition for part of the route was completed in 1975, and construction of a cutting at the city end commenced in 1974, only to be filled in two years later. By 1982, plans to build the line had been shelved by the state government and, in 1984, land reserved for the line once it left the freeway was sold by the Cain Labor government. In 1991, an independent report investigated constructing the line, recommending against it due to the high cost. However several other reports released since the 1970s noted the requirement for heavy rail mass transit in the Doncaster corridor.

The Doncaster rail line plan was almost identical to the Yanchep and Mandurah lines completed in Perth in the 2000s.

As a result of the construction proposed North East Link toll road road project, part of the median of the Eastern Freeway will be removed to increase the number of traffic lanes, and add a new busway alongside the freeway. As a result, a rail line to Doncaster along the middle of the Eastern Freeway will become virtually impossible to build, barring a conversion of the busway. A train service through Doncaster is proposed as part of the northern section of the planned Suburban Rail Loop.

== History ==
=== 1890-1969: Early proposals ===
One of the earliest proposals for a railway to Doncaster was in 1890, and involved an extension of the Kew line in a tunnel under the High Street hill, then across the route of Outer Circle line to a terminus at Warrandyte, with a branch line running to Templestowe.

In 1928, the Railways Standing Committee of the Victorian Parliament recommended a plan which also involved an extension of the Kew branch line, this time to terminate at Doncaster itself. That proposal was included in the Metropolitan Town Planning Commission's 1929 plan for Melbourne, together with the Glen Waverley railway line, which was subsequently constructed.

Concrete moves towards building the line were made in 1969, when The Age announced that the Victorian Railways had started detailed planning for a line which would run along the median of the Eastern Freeway and then on to Doncaster. The line was part of the 1969 Melbourne Transportation Plan, but no timeline for construction was set, whereas the building of the freeway was to start in the following year.

=== 1969-1972: Work begins ===
In December 1971, the Eastern Railway Construction Act 1971 was passed by the state parliament, setting the route as along the Eastern Freeway to Thompsons Road, then through Templestowe to Blackburn Road, Doncaster, involving the demolition of 30 houses. However, that route was not without opposition, as in 1972 The Herald reported that the outer section of the line would be investigated by the Parliamentary Public Works Committee. The City of Box Hill rejected a plan put forward by the City of Doncaster & Templestowe because it would cut into open space along Koonung Creek, and Doncaster residents objected to a route running through the Eastern Golf Course to Blackburn Road. In December 1972, the parliamentary report was delivered and recommended the original route to be constructed as opposed to the six alternatives, and criticised the government for allowing development on the proposed routes. The outer section of the line was estimated to be $23.5 million, the total cost of the line being estimated as $41 million. A terminus-to-city travel time of 20–25 minutes was expected.

The route decided upon was reported in The Age on 23 February 1973, but no completion date was mentioned:

- Victoria Park station to Thompsons Road in the Eastern Freeway median strip.
- Sub mile-long surface section along the Koonung Creek valley.
- Surface level north east from the creek to the entrance of tunnel, located near the corner of Harold and Dale Streets, Bulleen.
- 1.5-mile (2.4 km) tunnel north-east under Manningham Road and High Street, Doncaster; to a point close to corner of Oak Crescent and Fyfe Drive, Doncaster.
- 0.17-mile (0.27 km) above ground running eastwards from the tunnel portal.
- 1.65-mile (2.66 km) above ground running east to Tuckers Road.
- 0.5-mile (0.80 km) above ground running to corner of Blackburn Road and King Street.

That plan was what was shown in the 1979 (Edition 12) Melway street directory, albeit with additional short lengths of tunnel at various places along the outer section of the route. It remained in the 1982 (Edition 14) Melway.

=== 1973-1990: Partial land sales and Government pull-out ===
In May 1973, the state Liberal Party pledged to build the line if elected, but only to Bulleen. They were returned to power at the state election. By December the same year the Parliamentary Public Works Committee had begun to re-examine the outer section of the line, considering three routes. The first, costing $24 million, would terminate at Bulleen, the second continued with a branch to Doncaster Road and cost $28 million, and the third was the original route but now costed at $63 million. By March 1974, the cost of the full line was reported by The Age to have increased to $73 million, but that none of the proposed routes could be considered viable on economic grounds, with a busway being a better investment.

Despite doubts on the viability of the project, in July 1975 it was reported in The Sun that the Victorian Railways had purchased 18 properties for the railway. It was also reported in The Age that the government would still complete the railway, even though government sources put the cost up to $120 million, up from $74 million the year before. The proposed commencement date was after the completion of the underground City Loop in 1980.

In 1974, construction work commenced on a cutting at the Victoria Park end of the line to allow the line to access the median of the freeway, but ceased in August 1975 due to economic difficulties faced by the contractor. By October 1976, The Herald reported that the "$600,000 cutting" had been filled in with excavated earth from elsewhere. The reason given by officials was that it had to be filled so the freeway could be completed. The cost to rebuild the tunnel was estimated by the railways and the Country Roads Board at $1.5 million. The final nail in the coffin was a revelation in August 1984, by Liberal shadow transport minister, Rob Maclellan, that the Cain Labor Government had sold the land set aside for the railway beyond the Eastern Freeway to Doncaster.

=== 1991-2006: Continued support and alternatives ===
In July 1991, a report on transport in the Eastern Freeway corridor was presented to the Victorian transport minister Peter Spyker. Authored by Professor Bill Russell, three options were examined in the report:

- Heavy rail to Doncaster Shoppingtown, via Eastern Freeway to Bulleen Road then underground to terminus ($336 million)
- Heavy rail to Blackburn Road and George Street, East Doncaster ($471 million)
- Extension of North Balwyn (tram route 48) along Doncaster Road from Balwyn Road to Doncaster Shoppingtown ($6 million)

The longest of the plans involved six kilometres of tunnel, and seven stations, four of them underground. The report found that a heavy rail line would be "desirable but too expensive to consider unless major economies in tunnelling and station construction costs can be made". Estimates by the Public Transport Corporation costed the two rail options at $376 million and $550 million respectively.

Despite construction of the line being raised on a regular basis by public transport advocates and political hopefuls, there was no firm commitment to build it. In 2006, the cost to construct the line was estimated at $1 billion. Transport in the region provided by private motor vehicles on the Eastern Freeway, and bus routes which operate along dedicated lanes from the Doncaster Park & Ride.

In 2003, the Northern Central City Corridor Strategy provided comparative costings for heavy rail, light rail and high-quality bus services.

During the 2006 state election, the Victorian Liberal Party claimed that constructing the heavy rail line would cost around $1 billion and was deemed too expensive an option in the short term. It promised instead to extend the number 48 tram to Doncaster Hill.

=== 2007-2017: Increased local council and public pressure ===
Diagram showing Melbourne's rail network, including former and currently planned lines (as of 2023); note the Doncaster line is no longer shown

Following the state election in 2006, public pressure mounted for the construction of the line and local councils began to advocate for the construction of the line, holding regular meetings, discussions and forums.

In March 2008, a petition of 7,000 signatures supporting the Doncaster rail line, organised by the Melbourne Transport Forum, was delivered by local councillors to Minister for Transport, Lynne Kosky. The issue was also picked up by social media, involving online groups and petitions.

In mid-2008, the Victorian Greens released a transport discussion paper, "The People Plan", which includes the Doncaster rail line.

In late 2008, at a forum investigating the Doncaster rail line, which involved the Yarra, Melbourne and Manningham city councils, it was noted that 41% of residents in the City of Manningham were classified as low-income earners (despite the eastern suburb affluence stereotype), which was higher than the Melbourne average. The discrepancy was suspected to be he result of the reliance on private cars to meet day-to-day transport needs due to the lack of alternative methods of transport. At the forum, public transport advocate Peter Newman noted the similarities between the Doncaster railway line and the Mandurah line in Perth, and suggested that the Doncaster line was the only viable option for both the short- and long-term transport needs of the area. Other recommendations included the creation of transport corridors to aid in the transition of the existing urban environment towards transit-oriented development.

In December 2008, in response to massive patronage growth on Melbourne's public transport system and increased road congestion problems, the State Labor Government released a transport plan which did not deal with the construction of the Doncaster line. The proposal investigated the construction of a freeway through Greensborough, into Heidelberg and through the Yarra River Flats to connect with the Eastern Freeway at a cost of $6 billion. The proposal was six times the cost of the Doncaster rail line and assumed continued reliance on private motor vehicles.

Also in December 2008, residents in the Mullum Mullum ward in Manningham for the first time elected a former Green party candidate David Ellis, who has been campaigning against the construction of the proposed freeway through Manningham.

In mid 2009, as part of the development of the Victorian Transport Plan, the Labor government pledged to create a Doncaster Area Rapid Transport (DART) system. However, unlike its DART and BART cousins in Dublin and San Francisco, the scheme was merely an increase in bus services in the Manningham area. Further online support from the community resulted, with a new, unofficial petition and information website supporting the building of the railway.

Leading up to the 2010 state election, which they subsequently won, the Victorian Liberal Party promised to commit $6.5m to complete another study into building the railway line to Doncaster. Money was allocated for the study in the 2011 Budget. No funding was allocated for the building of the line.

=== Abandonment and adoption of busway proposal ===
In 2017, as part of the proposed North East Link road project, the median of the Eastern Freeway was to be narrowed, including a busway alongside the freeway. As a result, it is unlikely that a rail line to Doncaster could be built in the Eastern Freeway median, unless the busway was converted. However an orbital train service through Doncaster is now proposed as part of the northern section of the Suburban Rail Loop.

== Routes ==
The 2012 Doncaster Rail Study decided upon three key routes in the first phase of its study:

- Rapid Transit: “Express to City” - the traditional route along the Eastern Freeway median strip (study team's preferred option)
- Local Access: “Stopping all Stations” - through the City of Boroondara mostly underground to Doncaster
- Orbital Network: “South to Box Hill” - a connection from Box Hill railway station; now proposed as part of a future northern section of the Suburban Rail Loop

On the map below, the Rapid Transit theme is represented in blue, Local Access in green and the Orbital Network option in red. Orange nodes represent potential new stations and yellow lines are possible future extensions.

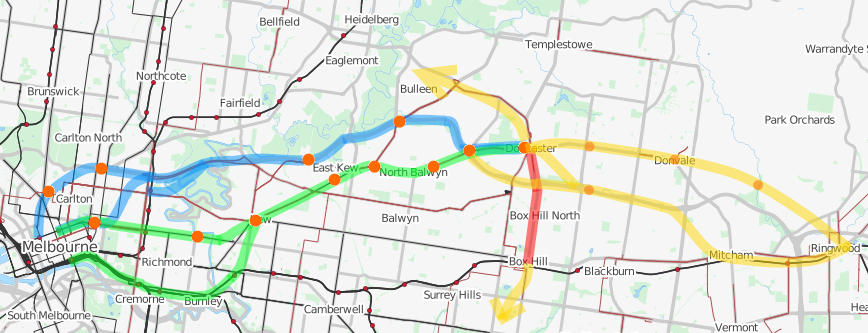
The three themes of the 2012 Doncaster Rail Study

== Recent costings ==
At the 2006 Victoria state election, the Labor Government costed the construction of the Doncaster rail line at around $1 billion. Other costings have been as high as $3 billion. In 2008, the Australian Greens Victoria released a transport discussion paper, The People Plan, which costed the construction of the line at $450 million. The Age newspaper quoted a 2012 report by transport experts from various Australian universities that suggested the line could be built for $840 million, being funded by the increase in property prices of the surrounding areas (although the report has not been made publicly available for review).

The Doncaster Rail Study Phase One Report given to the Victorian Government in February 2014 estimated the cost of a line from Clifton Hill to the Doncaster Park & Ride at between $3 - $5 billion with and extra $1 billion to extend the line to the Doncaster Activity Centre. However the study found there was insufficient capacity between Clifton Hill and the city for trains from the new line so an extra $4 - $6 billion would be required to run the Mernda line from in a new tunnel to the city.

== Capacity constraints and patronage sources ==
In 2012, the corridor from Clifton Hill to the city has a capacity of 22 trains per hour, with 17 trains per hour in the peak running, but it is predicted by 2021 the capacity can only be upgraded to 26 trains per hour and it is presumed 24 trains per hour will be used on the South Morang and Hurstbridge lines due to patronage increases and suburban growth, leaving only 2 trains per hour for Doncaster trains.

Trains per hour (peak)	South Morang line	Hurstbridge line	Doncaster line
PTV	12	12	2
PTUA	7	11	6

The Public Transport Users Association disputes this, arguing there is capacity for 6 Doncaster trains per hour, along with 11 Hurstbridge and seven South Morang line trains along the Clifton Hill to city section of the track, with a capacity of 24 trains per hour (signalled for trains every 2 minutes and using 80% of this absolute maximum), and high capacity signalling allowing for up to 30 trains per hour. They also argue that peak time patronage is close to saturation, with more growth off peak

Average weekday patronage is predicted to be 56,000 boardings by 2031 with 98% of passengers coming from existing public transport, from sources such as the DART busses (Doncaster Area Rapid Transit) and the Ringwood line (shared section of the Belgrave and Lilydale lines).

== See also ==
- Eastern Busway, Melbourne
- Proposed Melbourne rail extensions
- East West Link

== External Resources ==
- GAMUT paper on the Doncaster Rail Line
