= Doncaster Park & Ride bus station =

Bus station in Melbourne, Australia

Doncaster Park & Ride
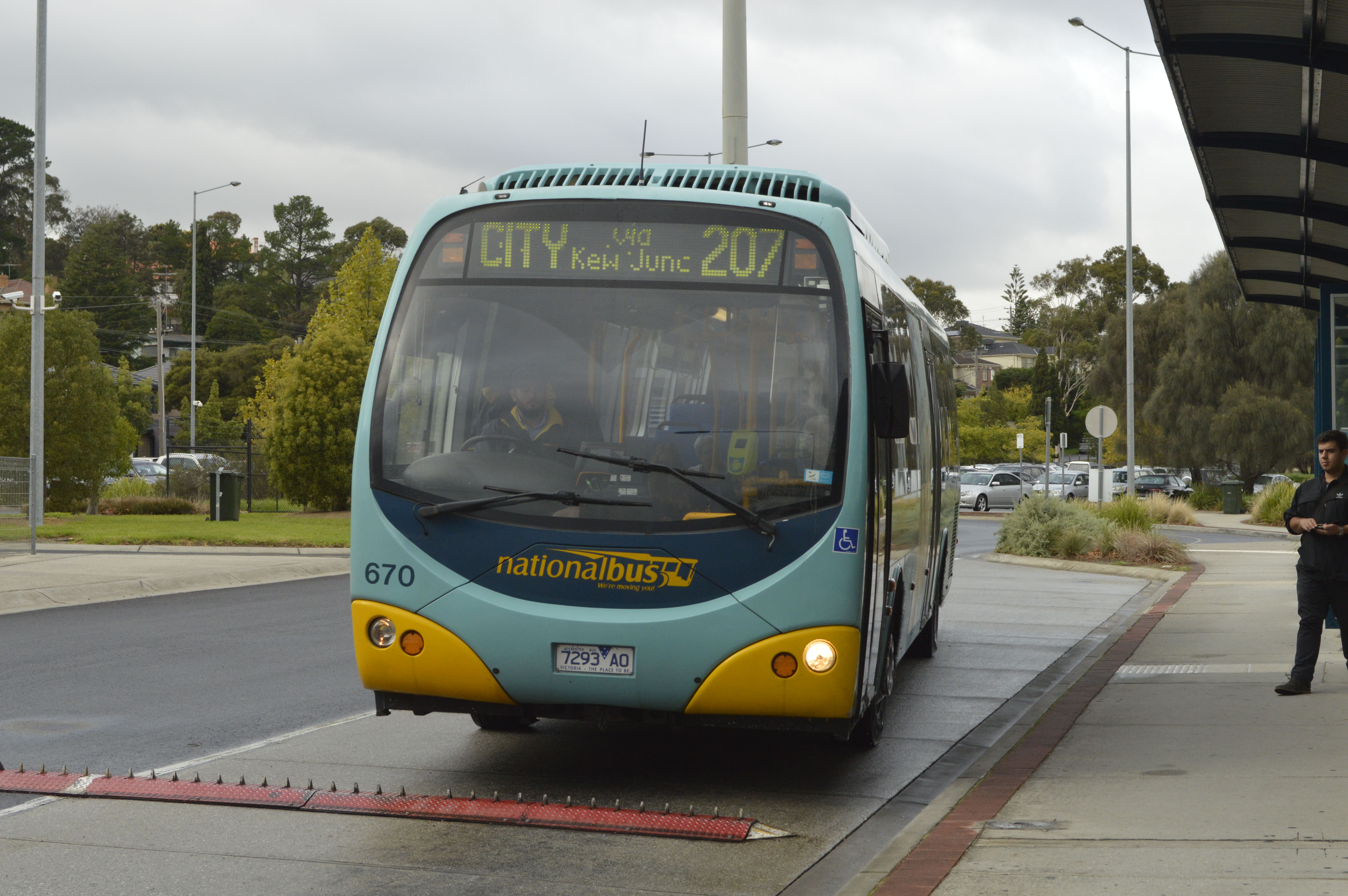
- Route 207 bus at Doncaster Park & Ride

General information
- Location: 398-412 Doncaster Road, Doncaster; Australia
- Coordinates: 37.788886°S 145.104825°E
- System: PTV bus stop
- Owner: Department of Transport and Planning
- Operator: Kinetic Melbourne
- Line: Eastern Busway (future)
- Platforms: 1
- Bus routes: 8

Construction
- Structure type: At-grade
- Parking: 400
- Accessible: Yes―step free access

Other information
- Station code: 21050
- Fare zone: Myki zone 2

History
- Opened: January 2003
- Closed: 12 January 2025 (temporary)
- Rebuilt: 2028 (expected)

Services
Preceding station	PTV Bus	Following station
Future
Bulleen Park and Ride towards Hoddle Street	Eastern Busway	Terminus
Location

Doncaster Park & Ride was a park and ride bus station and a future busway station located in Melbourne, Australia. It served the suburb of Doncaster and situates next to the Eastern Freeway, and opened in January 2003.

It closed on 12 January 2025 to allow room for a new road to be built for temporary access to the Eastern Freeway during construction of the North East Link. It is planned to be rebuilt and reopen in 2028.

== History ==
The park-and-ride was opened in January 2003 by the state government partnered with the former National Bus Company. However, its usefulness was disputed due to a review of the facility by the Department of Infrastructure in 2004 found that of those using it, only one person was a new user of public transport. All other people had previously commuted by bus.

The station car park was part of the upgrades proposed in the Urban Congestion Fund (UCF) was established in the 2018–19 Budget by the federal government to increase the capacity of the car park. This project was approved in May 2020 for AU$6 million, fully funded by the Federal Government and to be delivered by the Government of Victoria. However, an audit by Australian National Audit Office found that the program was “not effective” and identification of projects “was not demonstrably merit-based”, and the park-and-ride facility did not qualify for funding. In the 2022–23 Budget, the newly elected Albanese government withdrew the funding commitment to this project.

As a part of the North East Link project, a dedicated busway will be constructed along with a rebuilt of the station, connecting the Park and Ride facility and Hoddle Street in the city with its own right-of-way. It is expected to be completed by 2028. Due to construction of a new temporary road to maintain car access to the Eastern Freeway, the bus interchange closed on 12 January 2025. The lack of information, length of the closure and poor alternative facilities have been criticised by transport planners and local councils.

== Facilities ==
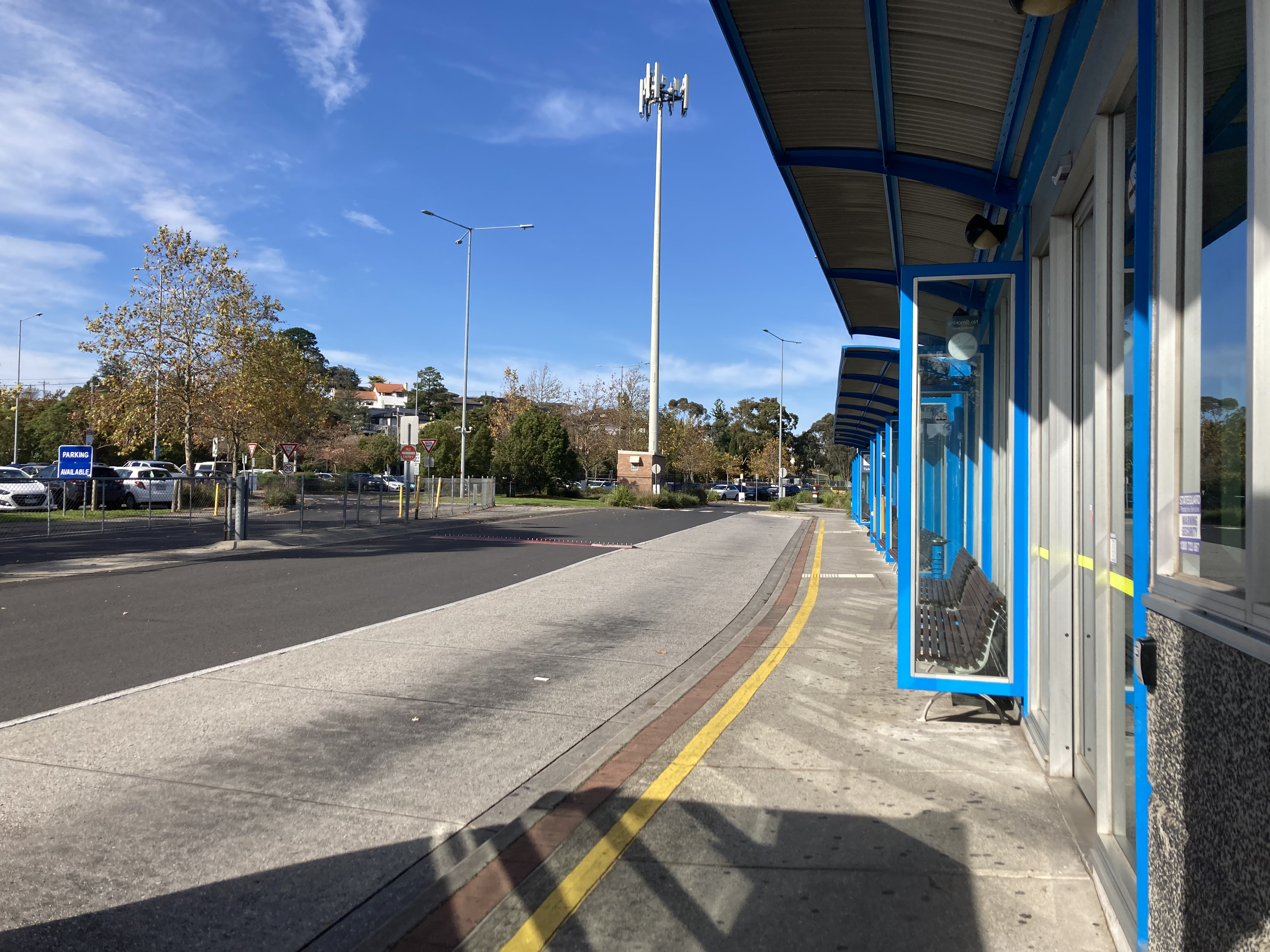
Doncaster Park & Ride bus station platform

The station serviced the 907 and 908 SmartBus services, a part of the Doncaster Area Rapid Transit (DART), as well as seven other bus routes. Apart from a park-and-ride, the station also acts as an interchange between Eastern Freeway express routes and other bus routes.

The station had an indoor waiting area, a sheltered waiting area, a Parkiteer bicycle cage, a toilet, and a customer information centre.

Although this station was served by eight bus routes, there was only one boarding platform with some buses stopping at the same stop in both directions and causing confusion for passengers. Some suggest that the limited platform space and inconsistent stopping spots for buses create a dangerous waiting environment.

== Bus routes ==
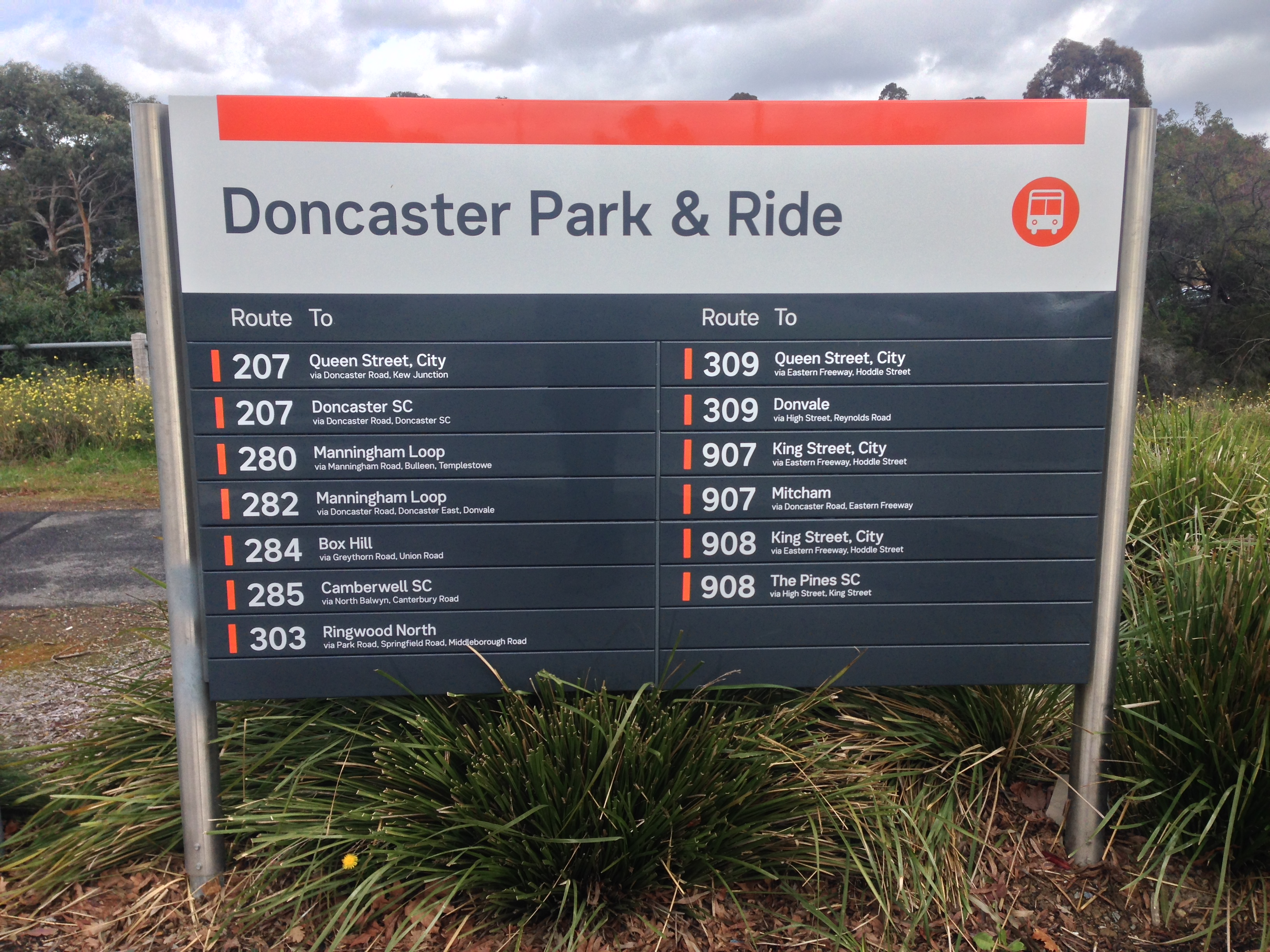
Sign showing bus routes departing Doncaster Park & Ride as of 2018.

It was served by nine routes all operated by Kinetic Melbourne, under contract to Public Transport Victoria:

- 207 : Melbourne CBD (Queen Street) – Westfield Doncaster
- 280 : Manningham Loop (Clockwise)
- 282 : Manningham Loop (Anticlockwise)
- 284 : to Box Hill station
- 285 : to Camberwell Shopping Centre
- 303 : to Ringwood North (PM peak only)
- SmartBus 907 : Melbourne CBD (Lonsdale Street) – Mitcham station
- SmartBus 908 : Melbourne CBD (Lonsdale Street) – The Pines Shopping Centre (to city at AM peak only)
