= Eastern Busway, Melbourne =

Bus route in Melbourne, Australia

Eastern Busway

Overview
- Operator: Kinetic Melbourne (projected)
- Status: Under construction
- Began service: 2028 (projected)

Route
- Route type: Bus rapid transit
- Locale: Melbourne, Victoria; Australia
- Start: Hoddle Street
- Via: Eastern Freeway
- End: Doncaster Park & Ride
- Length: 11 kilometres (6.8 mi)
- Stations: 2
- Zones: Myki zone 1 and 2

The Eastern Busway is a bus rapid transit line under construction in the eastern suburbs of Melbourne, Australia. It will operate alongside the Eastern Freeway, from Hoddle Street in Abbotsford to Doncaster Road in Doncaster. As a part of the North East Link project and Eastern Freeway upgrade, the busway has commence construction along with Eastern Freeway Upgrade in 2024, and is expected to be completed by 2028.

== History ==
The concept of a busway between the Melbourne CBD and Doncaster was first proposed by Transdev, a French transport company that operated buses in Melbourne from 2013 to 2022, running from Donvale Hospital then along Doncaster Road, through the median of the Eastern Freeway, Hoddle Street, Victoria Parade and Lonsdale Street to a new underground bus terminus at Southern Cross Station. It also included stations at Chandler Highway, Burke Road and Bulleen Road. Originally known as the Doncaster Busway, the project was estimated to cost over 500 million Australian dollars. However, the proposal was rejected by the Victorian State Government in 2017. There has also been a proposal to use trackless trams for the busway.

In November 2017, the Andrews government announced the government's proposal of the busway as a part of the North East Link project. It will run from Doncaster via dedicated bus lanes on the Eastern Freeway to Hoddle Street in Abbotsford, with a new bus station at the Bulleen Road intersection. It had been originally planned for the busway to run along the median in the Eastern Freeway, but has since changed to be built adjacent north of the freeway to better integrate with the intermediate station at Bulleen. The Manningham Council had expressed their support for the facility due to its public space inclusion and public transport benefits.

The first part of the busway, Bulleen Park & Ride, has opened in April 2023. Construction of the main busway has commenced in 2024.

== Design ==
The Eastern Busway is designed as a fully grade-separated bus rapid transit (BRT) corridor running parallel to the Eastern Freeway between Hoddle Street and Doncaster Road. The busway will consist of two dedicated bus-only lanes, physically separated from general traffic by concrete barriers and continuous kerbing. The lanes are designed to support operating speeds of up to 100 km/h, enabling express buses to bypass traffic congestion along the Eastern Freeway.

Starting at Doncaster Park and Ride with a roundabout to allow buses to U-turn into the busway, the busway will go under Doncaster Road and continue parallel on the north side of the Eastern Freeway. At Bulleen Park & Ride, an entry point will be provided for bus services to continue north of Thompsons Road towards Bulleen and Templestowe. Two side platforms, one for each direction, will be provided and connected via an underpass from the lower-level car park. The busway will then intersect with Thompsons Road at-grade, under the Bulleen Road bridge and the North East Link interchange, then continue along the north side of the freeway, with no entry or exits at Burke Road.

At Chandler Highway, the busway will split in directions, where the city-bound direction of the busway will continue adjacent to the south side of the freeway via an overpass. A busway entry towards the city and an exit in the eastbound direction onto Chandler Highway is provided at this location. The busway will terminate at Hoddle Street, where buses return to congested mixed traffic with only part-time bus lanes. An Infrastructure Victoria report has recommended extending the corridor further into the inner city to maintain quicker and more reliable travel times.

=== Criticism ===
Buses would be limited to 80 km/h along much of the corridor and as low as 60 km/h in constrained sections near Chandler Highway, sparking criticism regarding the potential for slower travel times compared with existing freeway services. Though a government spokesperson stated that speed limits had not been finalised and that the dedicated lanes would still provide more reliable travel by avoiding congestion on the Eastern Freeway. This contrasted with earlier government statements from 2017, which promoted the busway as enabling 100 km/h express running and significantly faster travel times between Doncaster and the CBD.

== Stations ==
=== Bulleen Park & Ride ===
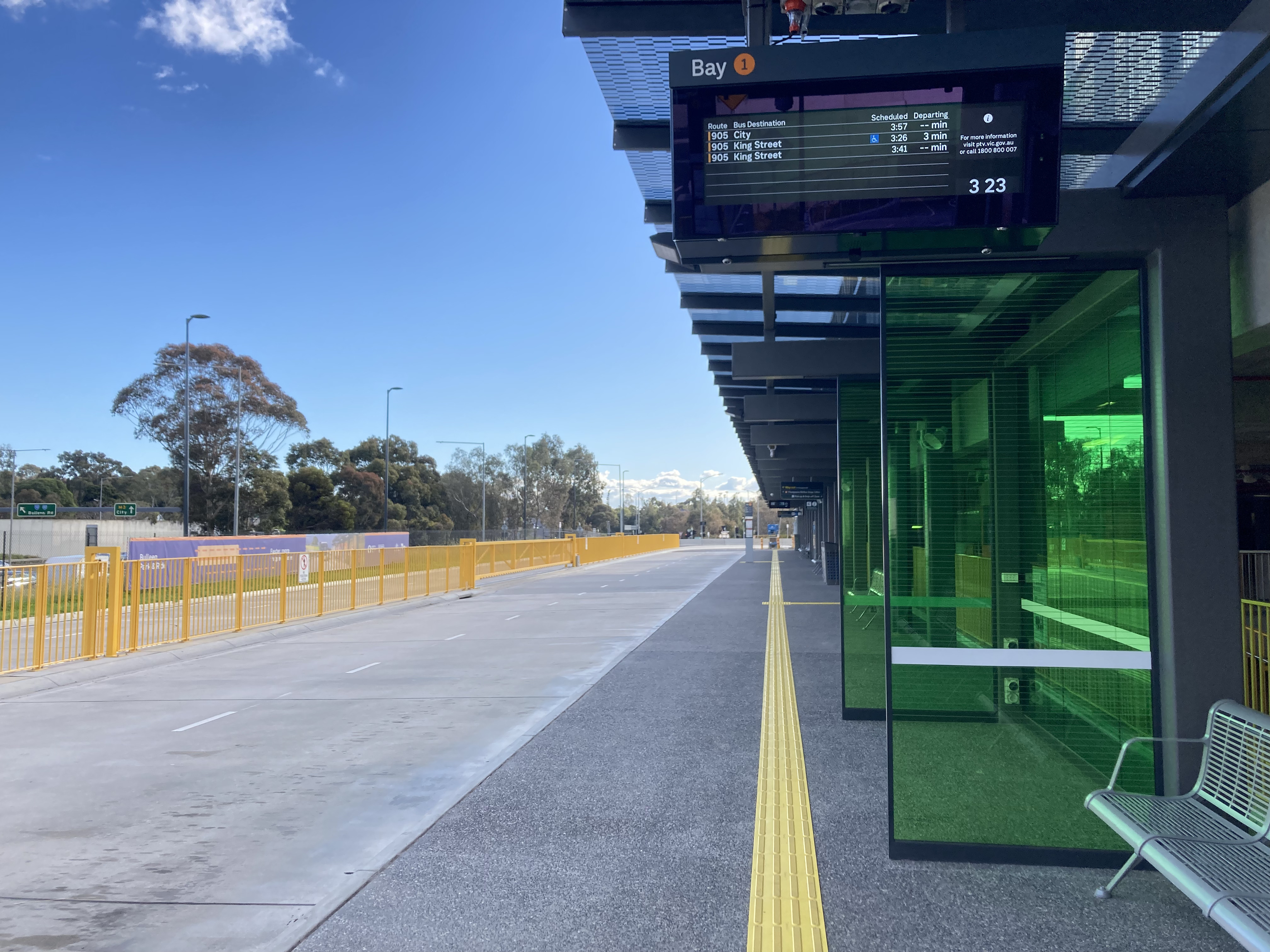
Bulleen Park & Ride future eastbound platform

The station cost $69 million AUD, and opened on 30 April 2023 four years ahead of schedule along with timetable and route changes. It is fast-tracked due to expected impacts to Doncaster Park & Ride, which is closed during its rebuild for the construction of the busway, and completing the facility early will remove the need for building a temporary park and ride station at the Doncaster interchange.

As of 2025, this station features an interim design that includes a bus turnaround at the western end of the platform to allow buses to deliver passengers to the stop and return to Thompsons Road. The future eastbound platform will temporarily service all destinations while the busway is under construction. It will be fully integrated with the busway once it has finished construction in 2028, featuring a platform in each direction.

=== Doncaster Park & Ride ===
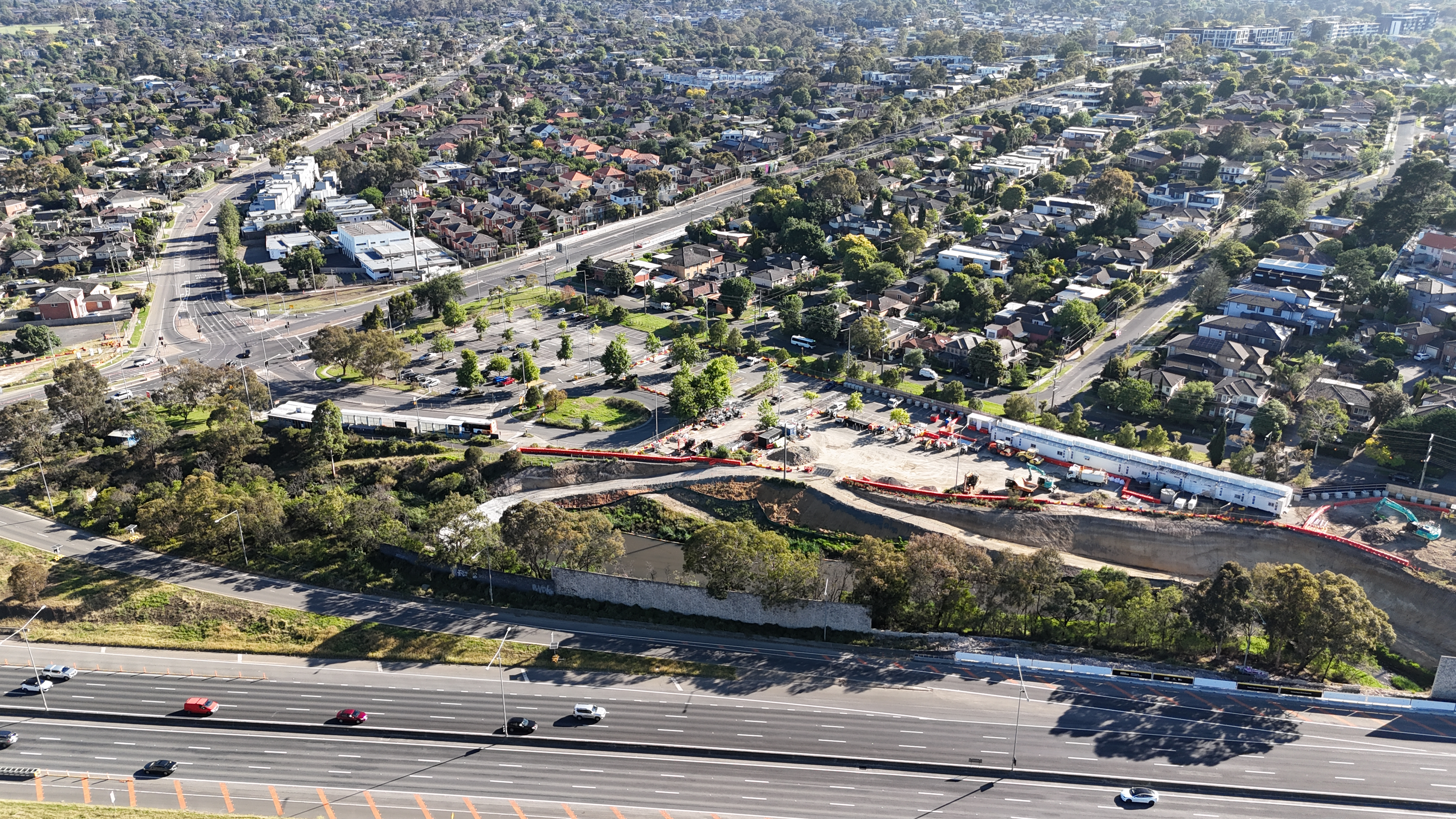
Doncaster Park & Ride under demolition

The park-and-ride was opened in January 2003 by the Bracks government partnered with the former National Bus Company. It was closed on 12 January 2025 to enable the construction of the entrance of the busway. Major construction on the new park and ride station which features 3 bus platforms (1 citybound and 2 outbound) and a multi-level car park began in November 2025, which will provide 435 parking spaces with a drop-and-go zone and bicycle parking.

Temporary bus stops for both directions were created on Doncaster Road near Hender Street. However, the replacement facility provided only basic platforms and limited shelter, with reduced accessibility due to the steep gradients and narrow waiting areas. Also, passengers transferring between services were required to cross Doncaster Road, replacing the former single-platform interchange.

== See also ==
- Doncaster railway line
- North East Link
