= North East Link =

Tollway under construction in Melbourne

North East Link Victoria
- Interactive map showing the main route of the North East Link, connecting the M80 Ring Road (north end) to the Eastern Freeway (south end).

General information
- Type: Freeway (Under construction)
- Length: 10 km (6.2 mi)
- Opened: Late 2028 (scheduled)

Major junctions
- North end: Metropolitan Ring Road; Greensborough, Melbourne
- Greensborough Bypass; Grimshaw Street; Lower Plenty Road; Manningham Road; Bulleen Road
- South end: Eastern Freeway; Bulleen, Melbourne

Highway system
- Highways in Australia; National Highway • Freeways in Australia; Highways in Victoria

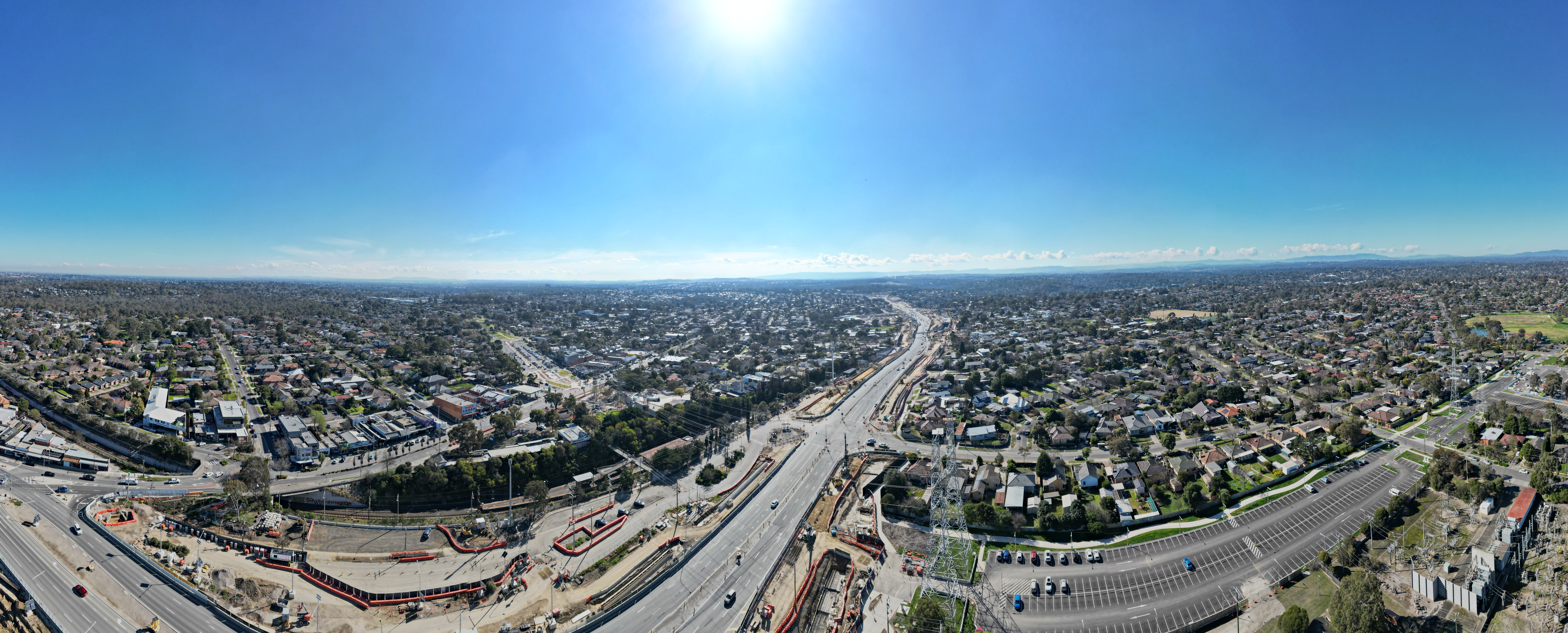
Watsonia facing north, with the Northeast Link Big Build in 2025

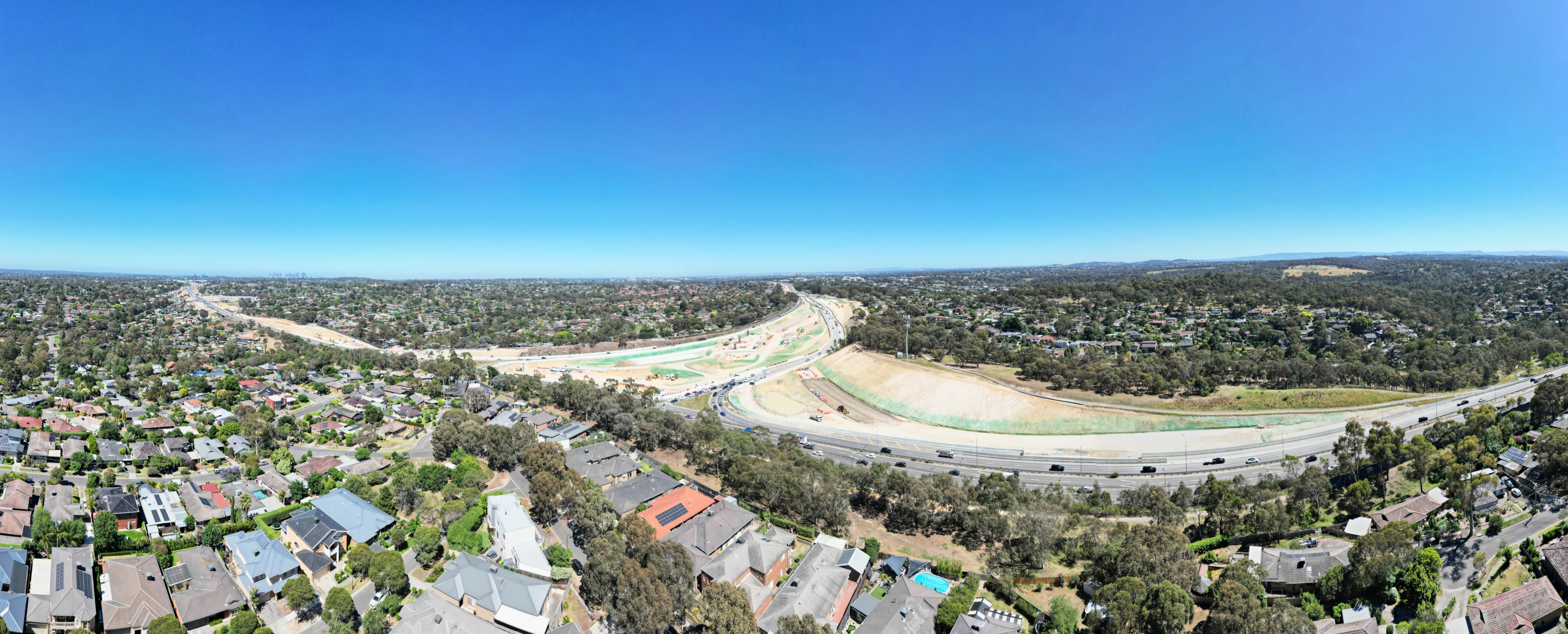
North East Link where Greensborough meets the M80

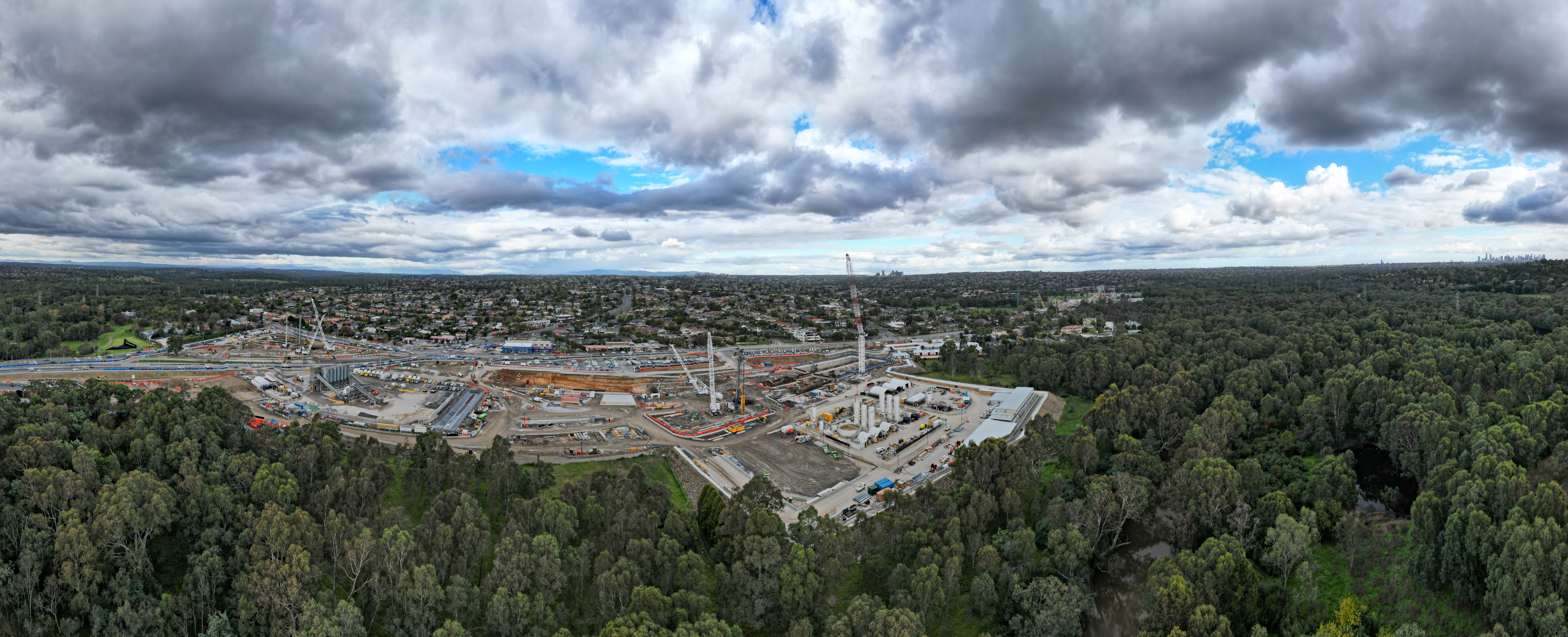
The North East Link works around Yarra Flats Park, April 2024.

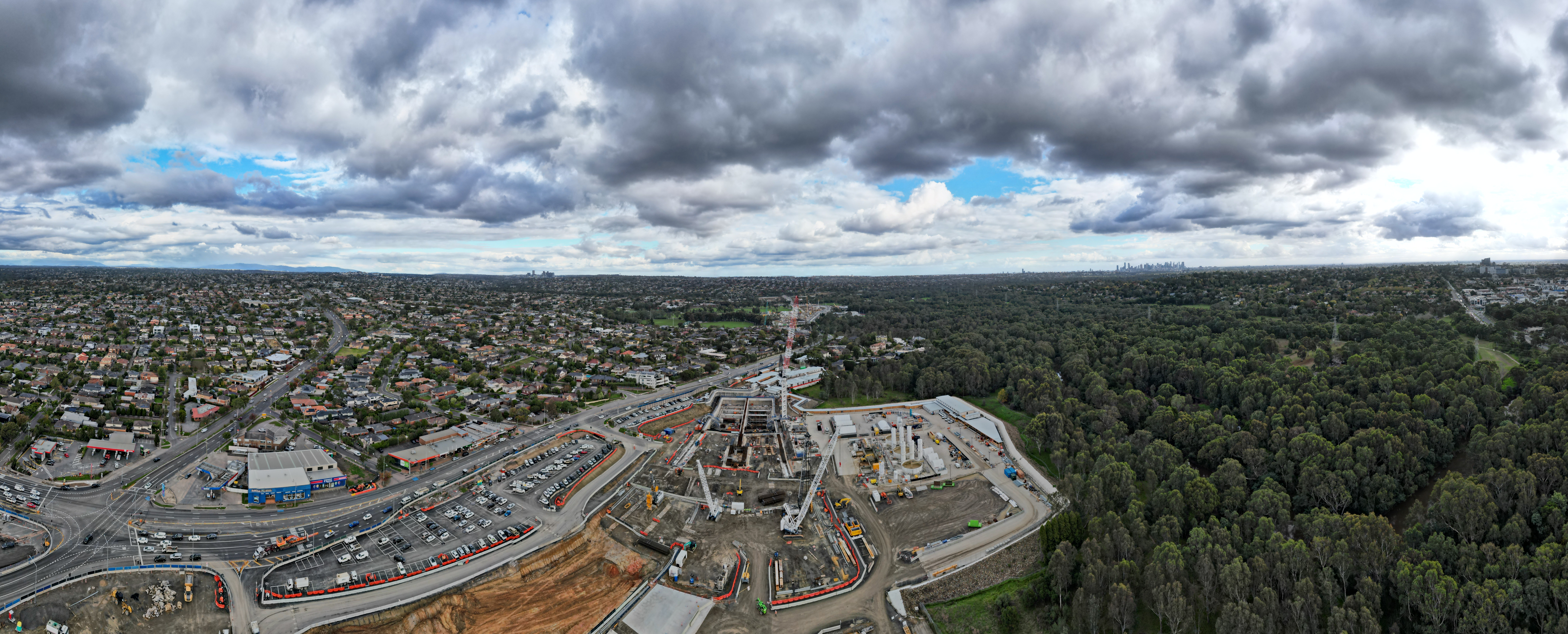
The Yarra Flats, North East Link build and the Melbourne skyline, April 2024.

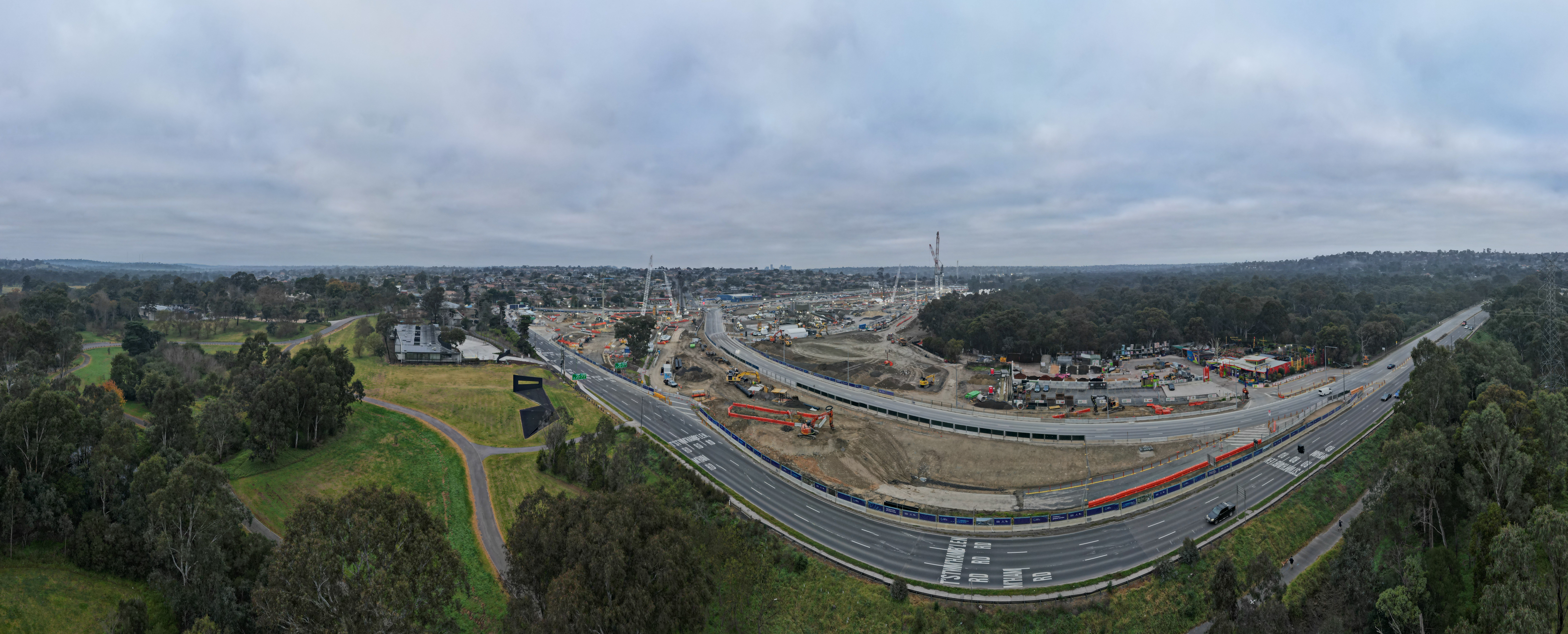
North East Link works next to Banksia Park and Manningham Road, July 2024.

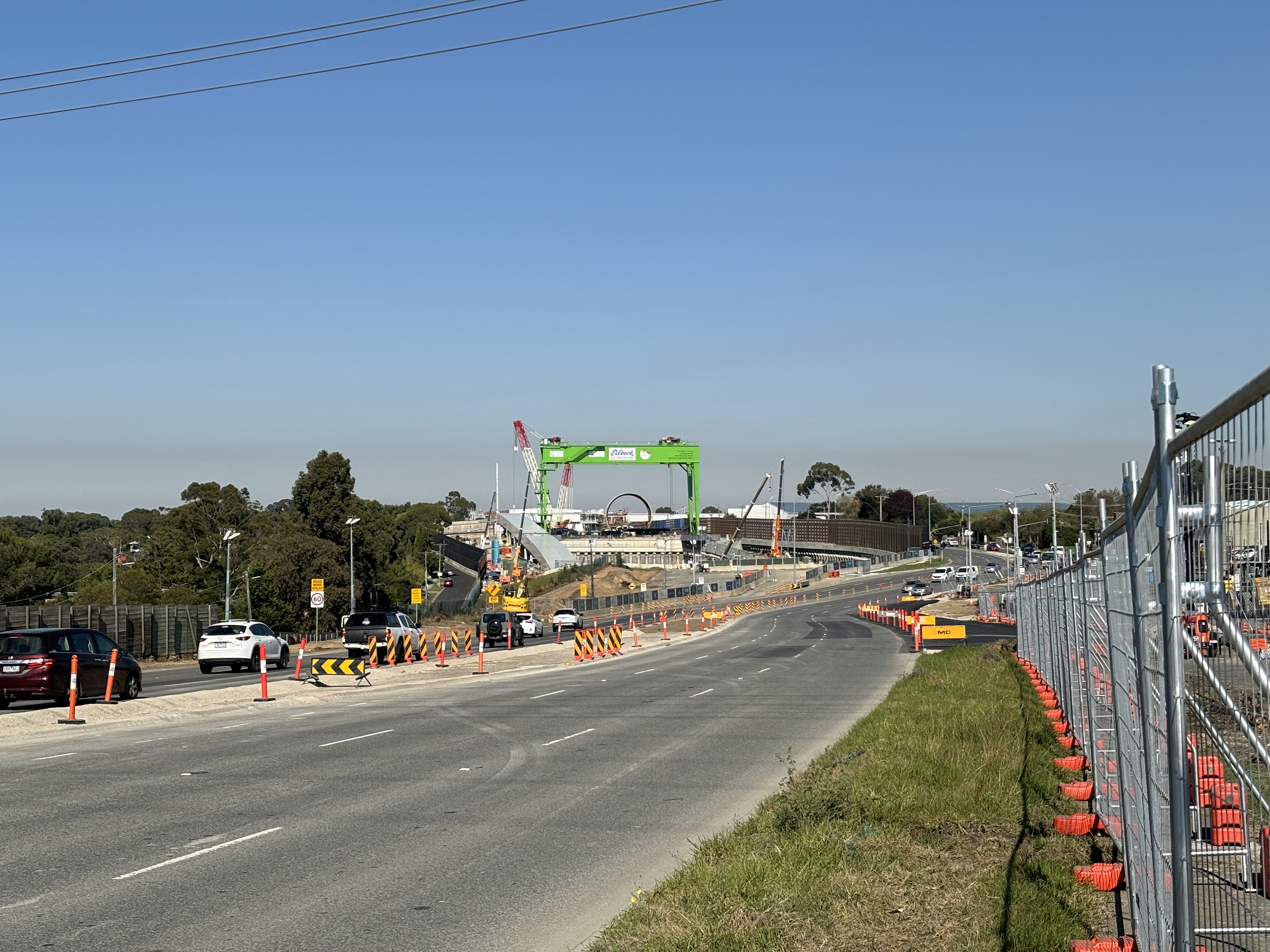
North East Link tunneling work near Watsonia Station on Greensborough Road, Watsonia.

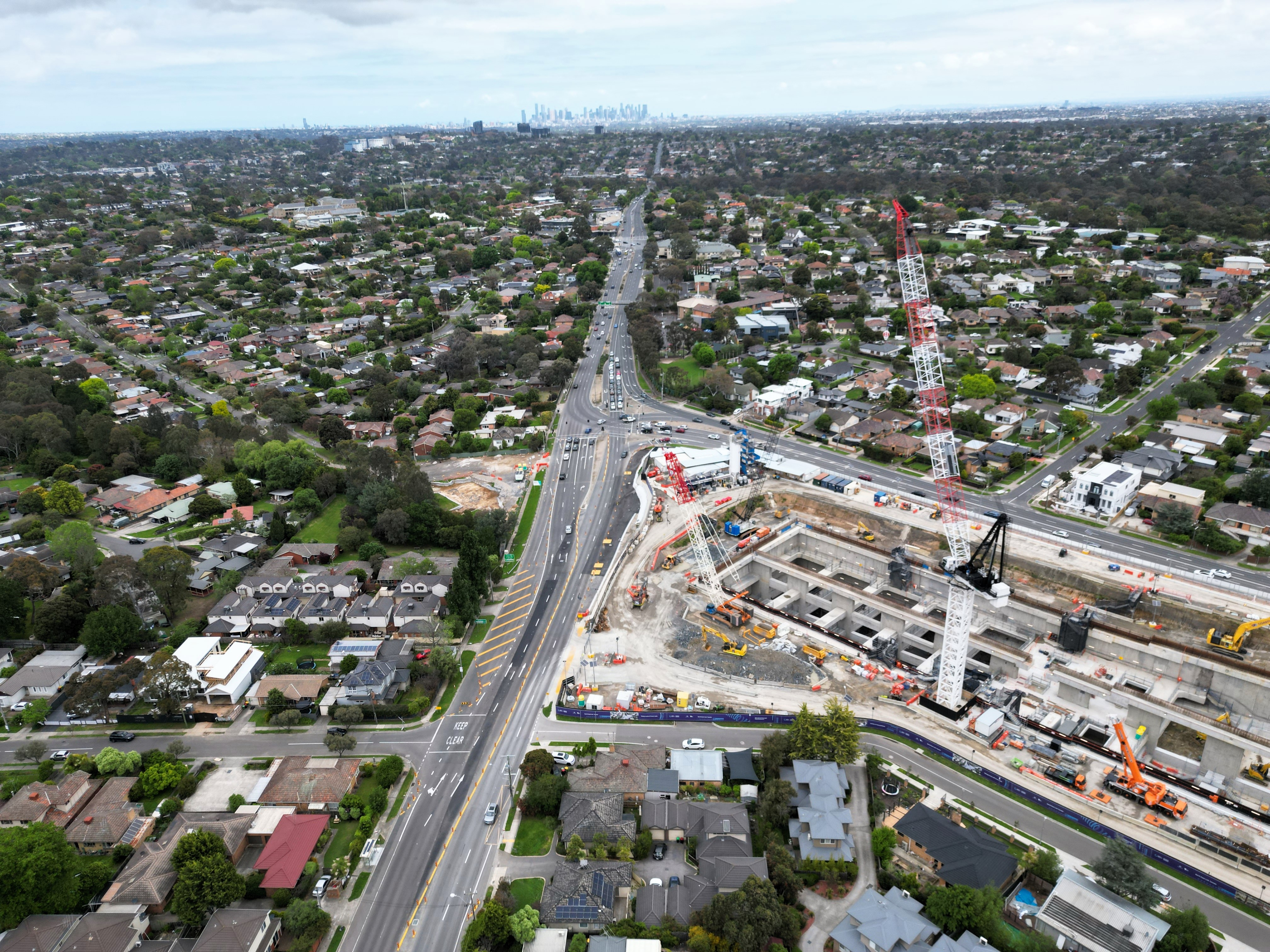
Northeast link at Viewbank facing the Melbourne skyline. October 2024.

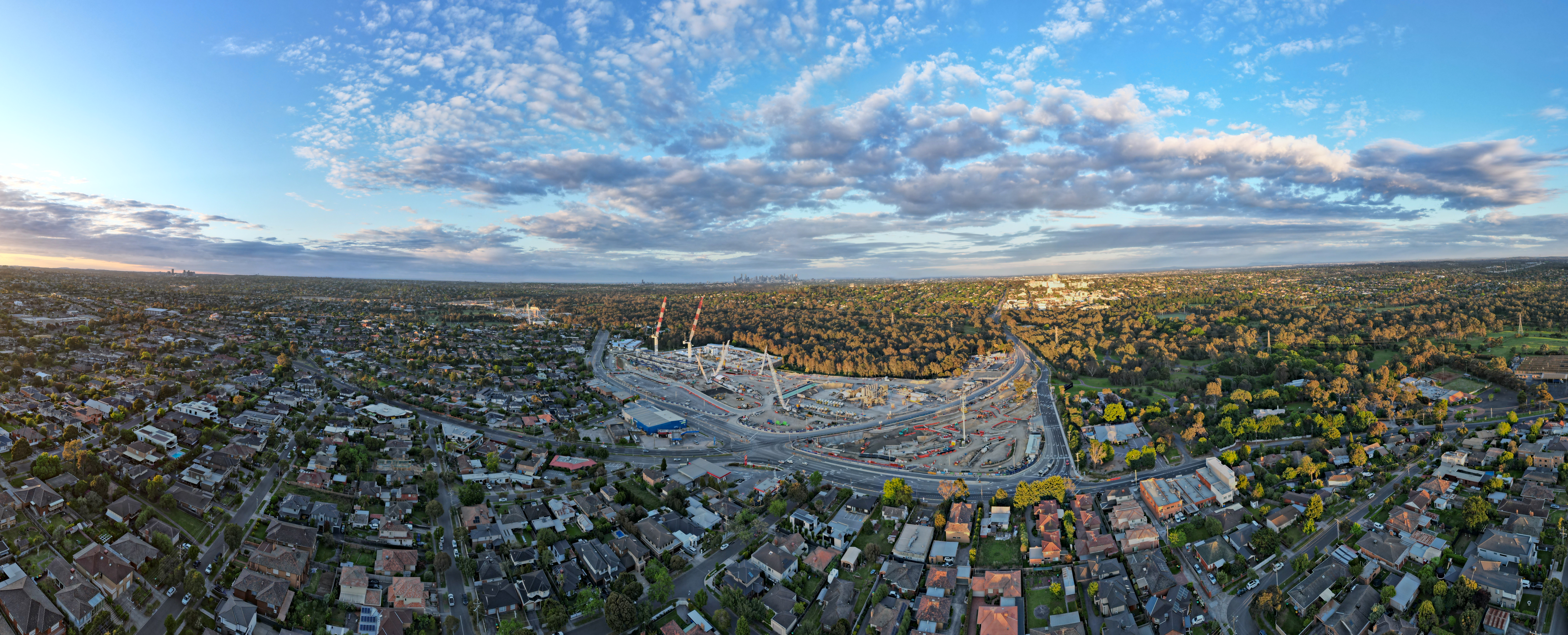
Bulleen aerial panorama with the North East Link Build

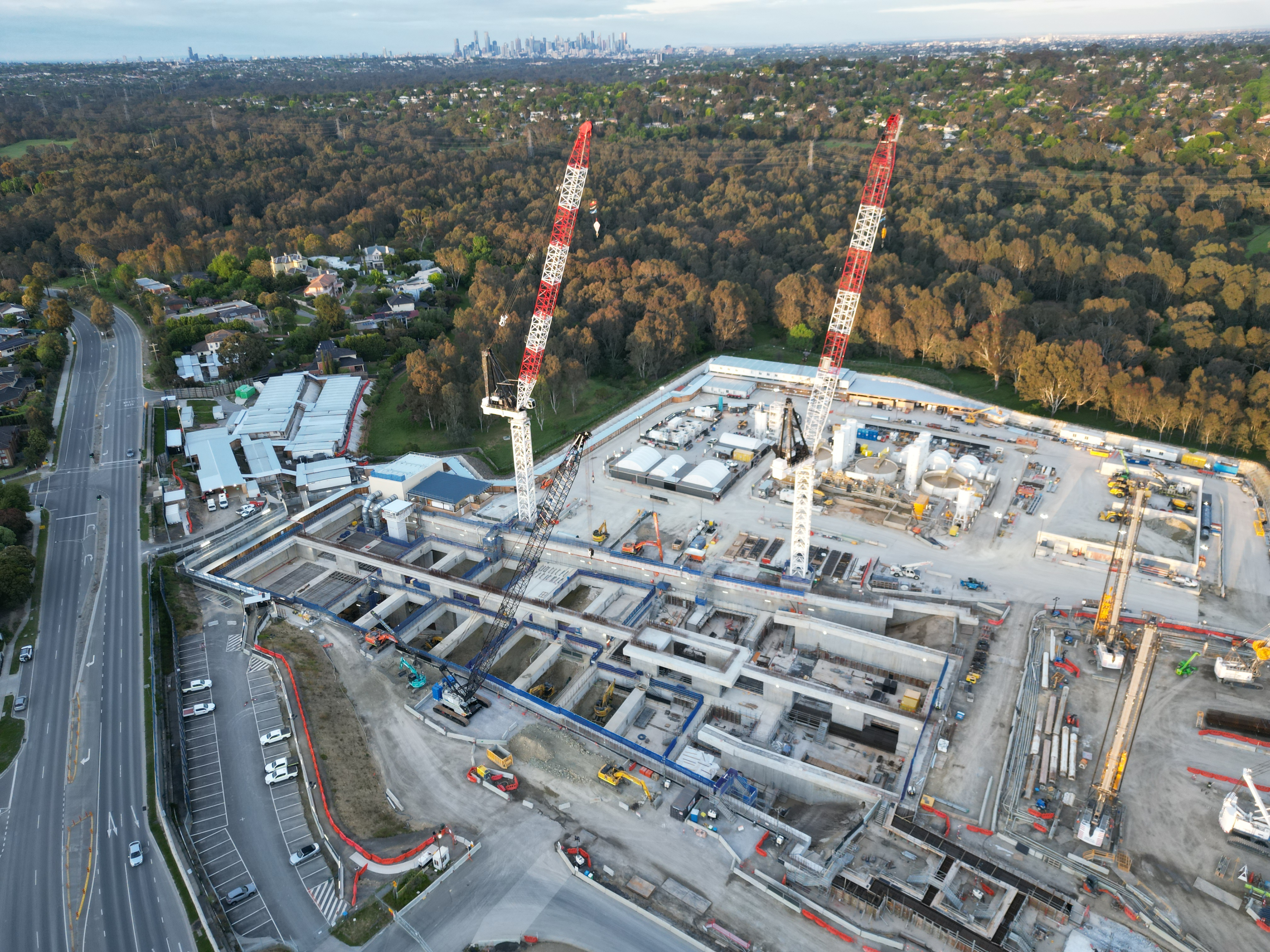
Closeup of the North East Link build in Bulleen

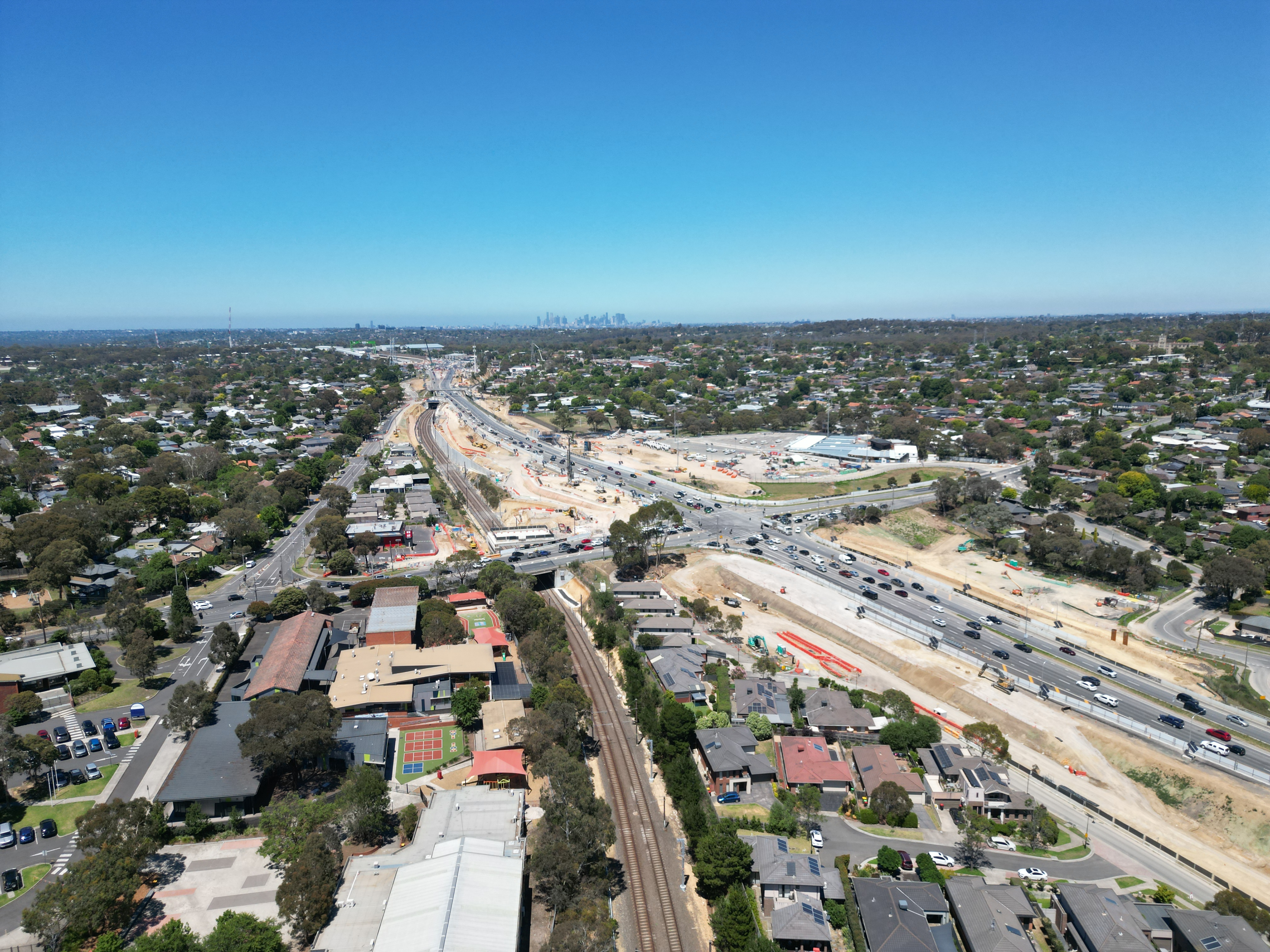
North East Link section at Greensborough and near the Hurstbridge Line facing the Melbourne skyline

The North East Link is an under-construction 10–kilometre tolled highway scheme in Melbourne, Australia. It will connect the Metropolitan Ring Road at Greensborough with the Eastern Freeway at Bulleen, which will be upgraded from Hoddle Street to Springvale Road at Nunawading.

Other components of the project include the construction of a new dedicated busway along the Eastern Freeway to serve the Doncaster area, and park and ride car parking facilities. The Eastern Freeway will be widened from nine lanes to 20 in some parts.

In December 2016, Victorian Premier Daniel Andrews announced that a re-elected Labor government would build the North East Link at a cost of $10 billion. Early works began in 2020 and tunnelling commenced in mid 2024, with an expected completion in late 2028.

In 2021, the length of the tunnelled portion was increased by 1.9 km to 6.5 km, and the cost of the main construction contract, to be delivered through a public-private partnership, rose to $11.1 billion. The overall long-term budget for the project was set at $16.5 billion in 2017, but this increased to $26.1 billion as of 2023.

== History ==
=== 1969 Melbourne Transportation Plan ===
The 1969 Melbourne Transportation Plan, released by the State Government under Premier Henry Bolte, planned for 510 kilometres of new freeways across Melbourne. This included the F5 - today the Metropolitan Ring Road - and the F19 - today the Eastern Freeway. It also included three north-south freeways connecting them together - the F6 along the Darebin Creek, the F18 through Watsonia and Bulleen and the F7 via Eltham.

After Bolte resigned in 1972, his successor Rupert Hamer announced the cancellation of many of the freeway routes. While this did not impact the two east-west routes, the F5 and the F19, all three of the north-south connecting freeways were formally cancelled. Hamer later announced in 1976 that all road reservations for unbuilt urban freeways at that time would be removed. However, this did not occur for many and the land was retained.

=== 1979 Outer Ring Study ===
Despite assurances that the freeways were cancelled, planning work continued in the State Government. The Joint Road Planning Group, part of the Country Roads Board and Melbourne and Metropolitan Board of Works, developed four proposals for a freeway between the Metropolitan Ring Road and Eastern Freeway in 1979.

They gradually increased in cost and scope as the study progressed. Despite it never being publicly adopted as government policy, most of all four proposals have been or are in the process of being constructed.

==== Concept A ====
The proposals began with Concept A which was limited to general road improvements for the local area without encouraging or providing for traffic to and from other areas.

==== Concept B ====
Concept B proposed widening existing arterial roads in the area. These were Fitzsimons Lane, Main Road, Wattle Tree Road, Ryans Road, Williamsons Road, Reynolds Road (Templestowe), Andersons Creek Road and Springvale Road. Widening the existing bridge over the Yarra River was also part of the plan.

==== Concept C ====
Concept C proposed a new arterial road, utilising some existing road reservations, but requiring a new crossing over the Yarra Valley.

The road was to go east from Greensborough along Allendale Road to Reynolds Road (Eltham), south following the transmission lines to a new bridge at Target Road, along Andersons Creek Road or Mullum Mullum Valley and then along Reynolds Road (Templestowe) and Springvale Road.

==== Concept D ====
Concept D proposed new freeway to link the F5 at Diamond Creek to the Scoresby Freeway at Ringwood.

These routes from went east from Greensborough and then south, either along Reynolds Road to a bridge at Target Road or east of Research to a bridge at Alexander Road. South of the Yarra River, routes along either the Mullum Mullum Valley or the ridge to the east, connected to the proposed Eastern Freeway extension near Quarry Road or Glenvale Road.

Bridges would cross at Diamond Creek Road, Ryans Road, Allandale Road, Main Road, Mt Pleasant Road, Heidelberg-Warrandyte Road, Reynolds Road, Tindalls Road, Park Road, Heads Road, Huggins Road, Deep Creek Road and Whitehorse Road.

=== 2007 Eddington Report ===
Despite repeated assurances from state governments, planning for roads or freeways between the Metropolitan Ring Road and Eastern Freeway continued. In 1999, a map was leaked from VicRoads showing proposals for two of the earlier concepts. Despite this information, in 2002 Transport Minister Peter Batchelor and local ALP state member Craig Langdon publicly promised that the North East Link would not be built.

In 2007, the Eddington Report by Sir Rod Eddington was released, recommending the development of a North East Link.

=== 2008–2010: Brumby Government proposal ===
In September 2008, GHD released a North East Link Assessment Proposal. This was followed by an announcement of plans for the North East Link along a route through Bulleen by the Brumby Government on 8 December 2008 in the Victorian Transport Plan. It was estimated to cost A$6 billion.

On 10 August 2010, Banyule Council contacted Tim Pallas, expressing its disappointment in what appeared to be a lack of transparency in the planning process for the North East Link and requests:

- Briefing of all options for the North-East Link and any costings and cost benefit analysis.
- VicRoads to advise of any new proposals that may be developed for the construction of this link.
- Confirmation if a surface link has been considered and any costings for that link.
- Confirmation as to whether a surface link is in VicRoads view still a valid option.
- VicRoads to undertake full public consultation.

The proposed freeway was a major factor in the resignation of the local MP for Ivanhoe. On 24 August 2010, Ivanhoe Labor MP Craig Langdon resigned from state politics stating: "My resignation also enables me to maintain a long-held commitment to the electorate, which was to resign from the government if I believed it was likely to build a freeway through Viewbank, Heidelberg and the Banyule Flats. Unfortunately, it appears that this could now be the case".

On 6 September 2010, Tim Pallas replies to Banyule council advising;

- VicRoads' planning for the North East Link is at a preliminary stage and detailed planning is still some way off.
- Once the preliminary stage is complete VicRoads will consult Banyule city council and their residents.
- The North East link expected to involve a tunnel between Lower Plenty Road and the Eastern Freeway to protect existing suburban areas and to minimise impacts on the Banyule Flats and avoid the Heide Museum.

On 6 October 2010, a North East Link freeway public meeting was held at The Centre in Ivanhoe. On 23 November 2010, Ex-Labor MP Craig Langdon letter boxes thousands of residents of Rosanna, Heidelberg and Ivanhoe with flyers titled "No freeway through Banyule" criticising Anthony Carbines who was preselected as his successor.

On 24 November, Labor announced costing for the proposal of planning, investigative, and environmental assessment activities for the North East Link at $15.4M, with construction originally planned to commence in 2012‐13. On 27 November 2010, the Victorian state election was held, with ALP MP Anthony Carbines winning the seat of Ivanhoe with 36% of primary vote and 51% of preferred vote. This state election also saw the narrow loss of the Labor Brumby Government, putting the plans for a North East Link on hold once again.

==== Route options ====
The North East Link – often marketed as the ‘missing link’ in Melbourne's ring road network – will provide an additional major Yarra River crossing for Melbourne.

Three proposed routes for the North East Link were identified by consultation report prepared by GHD Consulting for the Department of Premier and Cabinet in 2008.

1. An eastern option from the Metropolitan Ring Rd to EastLink via Kangaroo Ground and Chirnside Park.
2. A central option from the Metropolitan Ring Rd to EastLink via Eltham and Warrandyte.
3. A western option from the Metropolitan Ring Rd to Eastern Freeway at Bulleen via Watsonia.

Route 3 was selected as the preferred route. The link proposes a combination of above-ground roadway and tunnel between Lower Plenty Road and the Eastern Freeway at Bulleen Road which will traverse the Banyule Flats and Yarra River. Two tunnel proposals have been provided citing selection based on budgetary input. A shorter tunnel from Lower Plenty Rd to Bulleen Rd exiting near the Heide museum and a longer tunnel from Lower Plenty Rd through to the Eastern Freeway. Further detailed engineering investigations and community consultation was undertaken before finalising a route alignment and design for the road connection.

The project was submitted to the federal Australian Government for funding consideration.

==== Criticism of Route 3 ====
- The route will have the Eastern freeway carrying both circumferential ring road traffic plus city bound radial traffic. During peak hours this additional traffic will effectively further reduce the capacity of the Eastern Freeway between Bulleen and Ringwood. Other proposed routes connecting Greensborough to Ringwood avoid this problem.
- The current route may physically divide the local community and result in local residents having difficulty in accessing public services and amenities such as schools, shops and transport. However the group Resolve Rosanna Road would dispute this as it would alleviate a long felt need in the Heidelberg area.
- The interchange at Bulleen Road may be a complex tunnel/fly-over arrangement requiring land acquisitions from the adjacent Freeway Golf Course and tennis centre significantly diminishing the local amenity.
- The route would use the median of the Eastern Freeway reserved for the proposed Doncaster railway line.
- The route options assessment listed in the "North East Link Infrastructure Australia Proposal to Commonwealth of Australia" (obtained via Freedom of Information) contains no quantitative data supporting the economical costings when comparing routes.
- The Banyule Flats, the Warringal Parklands and the Yarra Corridor (the areas to be affected by the proposed freeway, tunnel or viaduct) are one of the natural areas in the inner North East and are extensively used for recreation. The Banyule City Council in 2014 tabled a proposal to have the Banyule Flats, the Warringal Parklands and the Yarra Corridor made into a Heritage listed area, but the nomination with Heritage Victoria was unsuccessful.

=== 2010–2014: Baillieu/Napthine Governments ===
As the Baillieu Coalition government won the 2010 state election with no firm commitment to the North East Link, on 9 March 2011 at the Metropolitan Transport Forum, Liberal MP Terry Mulder stated that the new Victorian government would continue to pursue funding for the NE link despite not receiving any funding from the federal government's advisory body Infrastructure Australia. Although this was the case, on 11 May 2011, Parliamentary Secretary for Transport Edward O'Donohue stated that North East Link was not part of the new Government's agenda but would be considered in the broader Metropolitan Planning Review which includes all aspects of planning across Melbourne including transport.

On 14 August 2013, Roads Minister Terry Mulder's spokeswoman Larissa Garvin states that investigations will continue under the new Napthine Coalition government and that "tunnelling will be required to protect existing urban areas and to minimise environmental impact on the Banyule Flats and Yarra River, with further planning work still needed."

The Coalition led by Denis Napthine lost government at the 2014 state election with no commitment by the government or opposition to fund a North East Link proposal.

=== 2014–present: Andrews/Allan Government proposal ===
A report dated March 2016 into Rosanna Road in Heidelberg, that shows 38,000 motorists, comprising 2000 trucks, some being B-Doubles use the road on a daily basis, places further pressure to build the North East Link. Labor Roads Minister Luke Donnellan stated the government would not commit to North East Link. Despite winning the 2014 state election with no firm commitments to the North East Link, in April 2016 Labor Treasurer Tim Pallas quoted the North East Link, declaring it "innately" makes sense.

In May 2016, Infrastructure Victoria released its new consultancy options assessment report. In September 2016, RACV released a Redspot survey highlighting that 6 out of 10 road chokepoints in the north east of the city support a North East Link. In October 2016, Infrastructure Victoria recommended that construction on the North East Link should begin in the next 10 to 15 years. In November 2016, the Liberal Federal Government released $15 million in funding for Victorian transport planning including the future of the North East Link.

In December 2016, the Victorian Labor Government led by Premier Daniel Andrews commits to build the North East Link within 10 years at a cost of approximately $10 billion, including the creation of a new North East Link Authority. On 18 February 2017, Victoria Roads Minister Luke Donnellan has announced the appointment of Duncan Elliott (RACV membership and rewards general manager) as the new chief executive of the North East Link Authority (NELA).

==== Route options ====
On 26 April 2017, Premier Daniel Andrews announced that North East Link planning would begin within the next few months, as $100 million was allocated in the 2017/18 Victorian State Budget for the project.

As part of the Andrews Government's planning for the North East Link, the North East Link Authority announced in early-mid 2017 four potential route (corridor) options that the North East Link could take:

- Route A (Red): A western option from the Metropolitan Ring Road to Eastern Freeway at Bulleen, via Watsonia and Rosanna.
- Route B (Yellow): A central option from the Metropolitan Ring Road to Eastlink at Ringwood, via Watsonia, Lower Plenty and Donvale.
- Route C (Purple): An eastern option from the Metropolitan Ring Road to EastLink at Ringwood, via Eltham, Warrandyte and Donvale.
- Route D (Green): A far eastern option from the Metropolitan Ring Road to EastLink at Wantirna, via Kangaroo Ground, Lilydale and the Healesville Freeway Reserve.

==== Preferred route ====
On 24 November 2017, the Andrews Government announced that it had selected Route A as the preferred route, identical to that of the preferred route under the former Brumby Government's Proposal. Preliminary costs and property acquisition details were also announced for the preferred route of the North East Link.

In April 2019, CPB and Laing O’Rourke were shortlisted for the $200 million early works package. The early works package began in early 2020, following planning approvals, and delivered a range of power, water and other utility works to pave the way for major construction on the $15.8 billion project between 2022 and 2024.

== Exits and interchanges ==
LGA	Location	km	mi	Destinations	Notes
Banyule	Greensborough	0.0	0.0	Metropolitan Ring Road (M80) – Seymour, Melbourne Airport	Northern terminus of North East Link; road continues as Metropolitan Ring Road
Banyule	Greensborough	0.0	0.0	Greensborough Bypass (Metro Route 46) – Diamond Creek, Hurstbridge	
Banyule	Greensborough	1.0	0.62	Grimshaw Street (Metro Route 48) – Bundoora, Greensborough	Single-point urban interchange
Banyule	Yallambie	3.5	2.2	Greensborough Road (Metro Route 46) – Greensborough, Rosanna	Northbound entrance and southbound exit only
Banyule	Yallambie	4.6	2.9	Lower Plenty Road (Metro Route 44) – Eltham, Rosanna	Southbound entrance and northbound exit only
Manningham	Bulleen	7.7	4.8	Manningham Road (Metro Route 40) – Heidelberg, Doncaster	Southbound entrance and northbound exit only
Boroondara	Balwyn North	9.8	6.1	Thompsons Road (Metro Route 42) – Balwyn North, Bulleen	Northbound entrance and southbound exit only
Boroondara	Balwyn North	9.8	6.1	Eastern Freeway (M3) – Clifton Hill, Ringwood, Frankston	Y-interchange; southern terminus of North East Link
1.000 mi = 1.609 km; 1.000 km = 0.621 mi: Incomplete access; Route transition

== Tolls ==
In March 2020, the state government announced that a state-owned corporation known as "North East Link State Tolling Corporation" would be set up to collect tolls for the North East Link.

== Proposed benefits ==
North East Link would complete Melbourne's Metropolitan Ring Road project and is estimated to carry around 100,000 vehicles a day, providing non-stop movement and easier access for freight operators, particularly between the growing industrial areas around Dandenong, Campbellfield and the new freight-hub near Donnybrook.

With Melbourne's north expected to be home to around one million people in 2026, it is posited that the North East Link will reduce reliance on Fitzsimons Lane, Heidelberg Road and Rosanna Road, and enhance road access to Melbourne Airport as well as popular regional and interstate destinations, and will allow traffic to bypass central Melbourne.

== Criticism ==
Banyule City Council has claimed that North East Link fails to effectively complete Melbourne's Ring Road project due to its connection to and reliance upon the Eastern Freeway and would be the only section of the Ring Road to rely on an existing radial freeway as a part of the route. The Victorian Transport Association has expressed its preference for an unconstrained ring road (known as Option C) to be constructed in the future.

North East Link is the most expensive road project ever constructed in Victoria and has already faced significant cost blowouts from an originally planned $10bn to $26bn.

A shift away from public transport to road transport of around 25,000 commuters per day is expected, with Tony Morton of the Public Transport Users Association quoted as saying "It's remarkable that anyone working in the public interest would be so positive about a project they find will put more traffic on the road at the expense of public transport."

== Community opposition ==
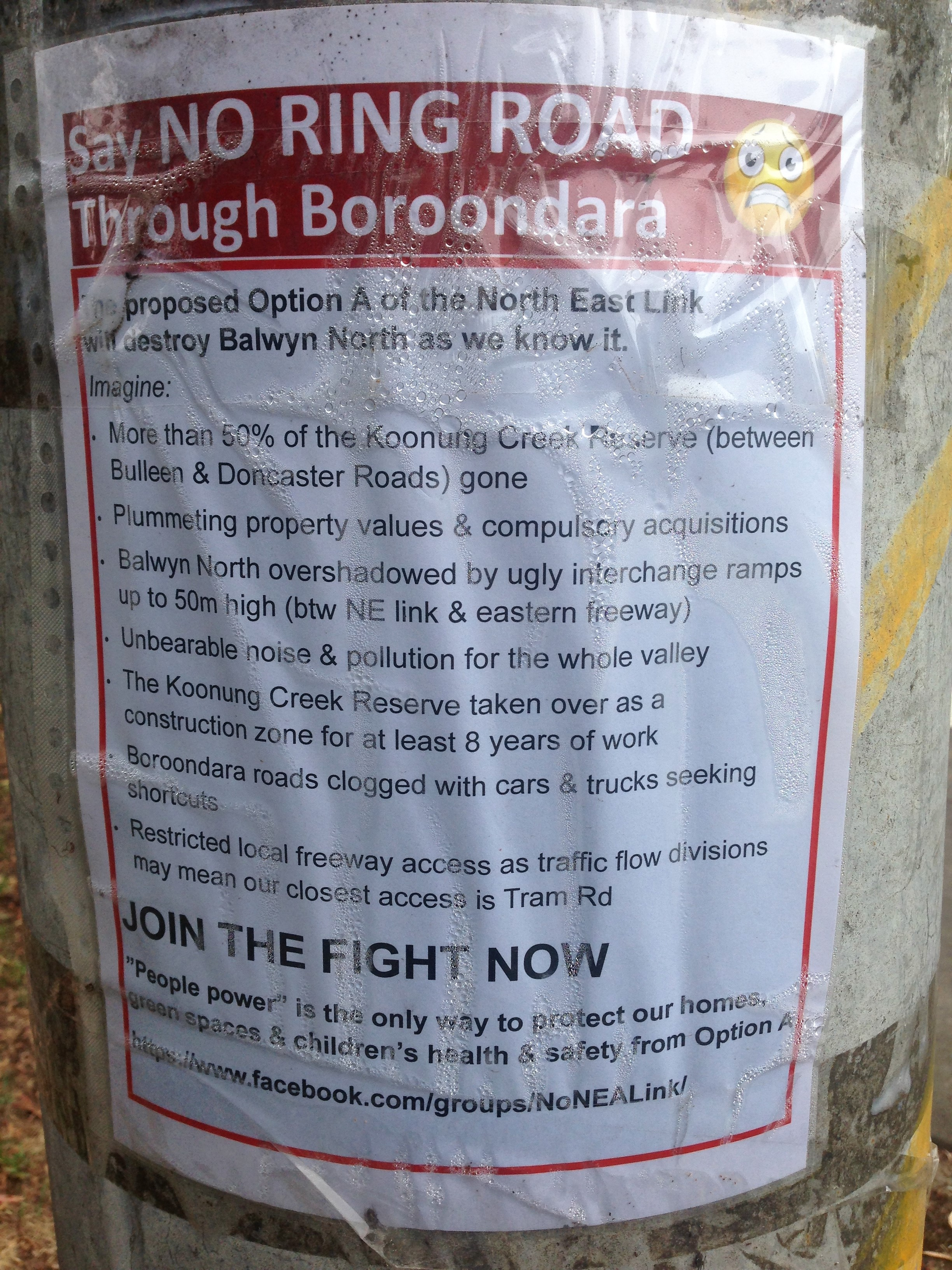
North East Link protest sign in North Balwyn, December 2017.

Since the announcement of the North East Link project, several community groups and local councils have voiced their opposition to the planned tollway.

Boroondara, Whitehorse, Manningham and Banyule city councils undertook legal action to challenge the project in 2020. Each had previously passed council resolutions to either not support or to directly oppose the chosen North East Link route.

Yarra City Council also independently opposes the North East Link, making a submission detailing its concerns with the project to the Independent and Advisory Committee in 2019.

== See also ==
- East West Link, Melbourne (A similar proposed freeway project in Melbourne)
- Eastern Busway, Melbourne (A dedicated busway that will be built with this project)
