= Bulleen Road =

Road in Melbourne, Australia

Bulleen Road Victoria
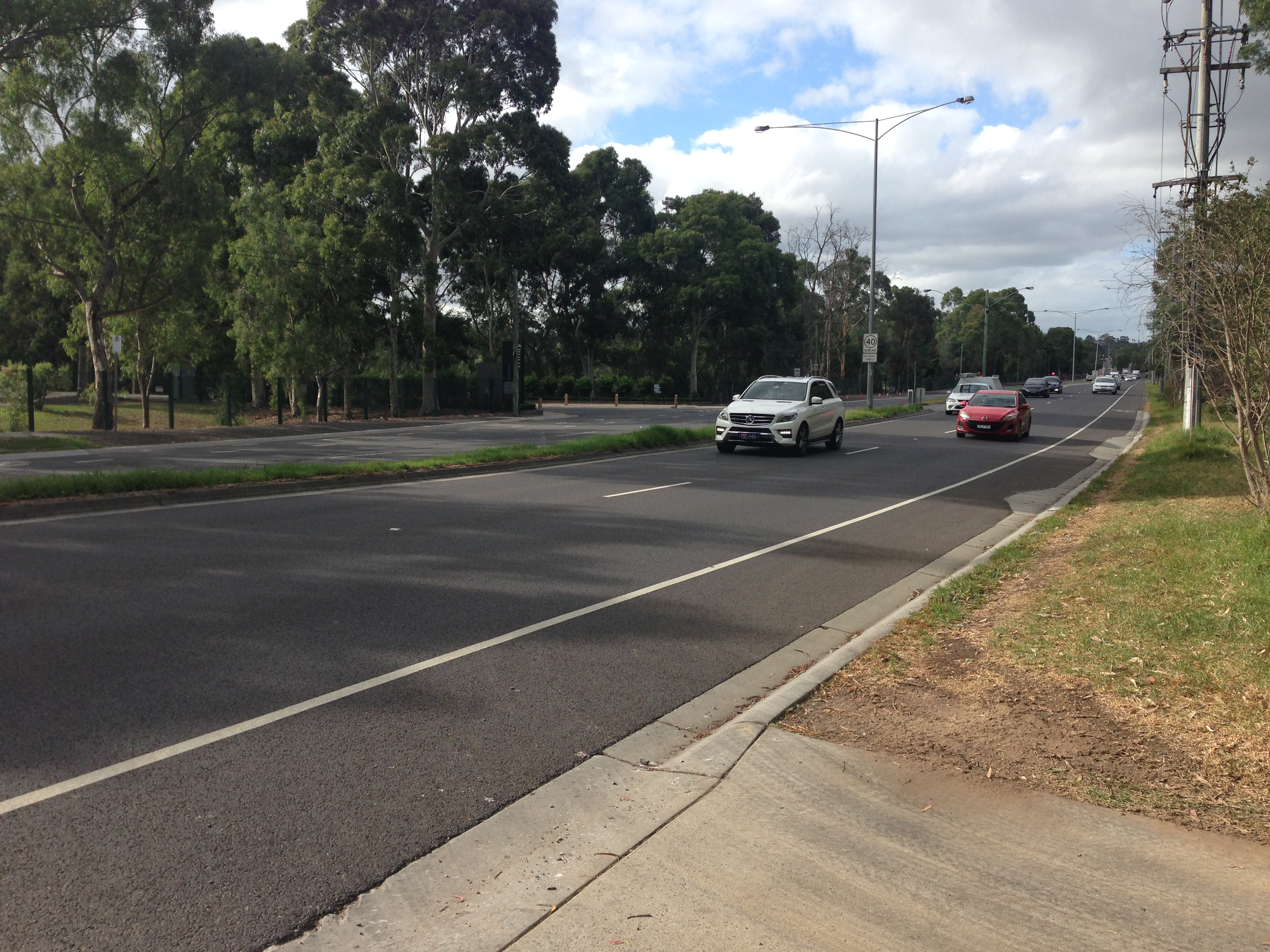
- Bulleen Road in Bulleen
- Coordinates: 37.760425°S 145.083848°E (North end); 37.792609°S 145.070479°E (South end)

General information
- Type: Road
- Length: 3.9 km (2.4 mi)
- Route number(s): Metro Route 52 (1989–present) (through Bulleen); Metro Route 42 (1965–present) (through Balwyn North)

Major junctions
- North end: Templestowe Road; Bulleen, Melbourne
- Manningham Road; Thompsons Road; Eastern Freeway
- South end: Doncaster Road; Balwyn North, Melbourne

Bulleen Road is a 4 kilometre long road in north-eastern Melbourne, Australia serving the suburbs of Bulleen and Balwyn North, which can be seen as an alternative thoroughfare between Heidelberg and Doncaster via the Eastern Freeway.

Since the opening of EastLink the road has seen significantly larger volumes of traffic, particularly between the Eastern Freeway and Manningham Road due to the traffic between the Eastern Freeway and the Metropolitan Ring Road.

== Route ==
Bulleen Road starts at the intersection with Templestowe Road and Bridge Street in Bulleen and runs south as a four-lane, single-carriageway road, nearly immediately crossing Manningham Road, eventually widening to a four-lane, dual-carriageway road a short distance south. It continues south until reaching the interchange with Thompsons Road and the Eastern Freeway, before narrowing backing to a four-lane, single-carriageway road and ending at the intersection with Doncaster Road in Balwyn North.

Marcellin College is located on the road in Bulleen. The Bulleen section is also subject to flooding on extremely wet days.

== History ==
Bulleen Road was signed as Metropolitan Route 42 between Thompsons and Doncaster Roads through Balwyn North in 1965; its northern half between Templestowe and Thompsons Roads through Bulleen was signed Metropolitan Route 52 in 1989.

The passing of the Road Management Act 2004 granted the responsibility of overall management and development of Victoria's major arterial roads to VicRoads: in 2004, VicRoads re-declared the road as Bulleen Highway (Arterial #6320), beginning at Manningham Road at Bulleen and ending at the Eastern Freeway in Balwyn North, while re-declaring the remnants between Bulleen and Balwyn North as Bulleen Road (Arterial #5363). The road is still presently known (and signposted) as Bulleen Road along its entire length.

== Major intersections ==
LGA	Location	km	mi	Destinations	Notes
Manningham	Bulleen	0.0	0.0	Templestowe Road (Metro Route 52/Tourist Route 2 north) – Templestowe, Doncaster East; Bridge Street (Tourist Route 2 west) – Heidelberg	Northern terminus of road; Metro Route 52 continues north along Templestowe Road
Manningham	Bulleen	0.2	0.12	Manningham Road (Metro Route 40) – Doncaster, Heidelberg	
Boroondara	Balwyn North	2.3	1.4	Eastern Freeway (M3 west, east) – Clifton Hill, Frankston, Ringwood; Thompsons Road (Metro Route 42 northeast) – Templestowe, Warrandyte	Grade separated interchange, eastbound freeway entrance via Thompsons Road; Southern terminus of Metro Route 52; Metro Route 42 continues south from Thompsons Road
Boroondara	Balwyn North	3.9	2.4	Doncaster Road (Metro Route 36) – Doncaster, Kew	Southern terminus of road and Metro Route 42
1.000 mi = 1.609 km; 1.000 km = 0.621 mi: Route transition

== See also ==
- List of Melbourne highways
