= Eastern Freeway (Melbourne) =

Freeway in Melbourne, Australia

Eastern Freeway Victoria
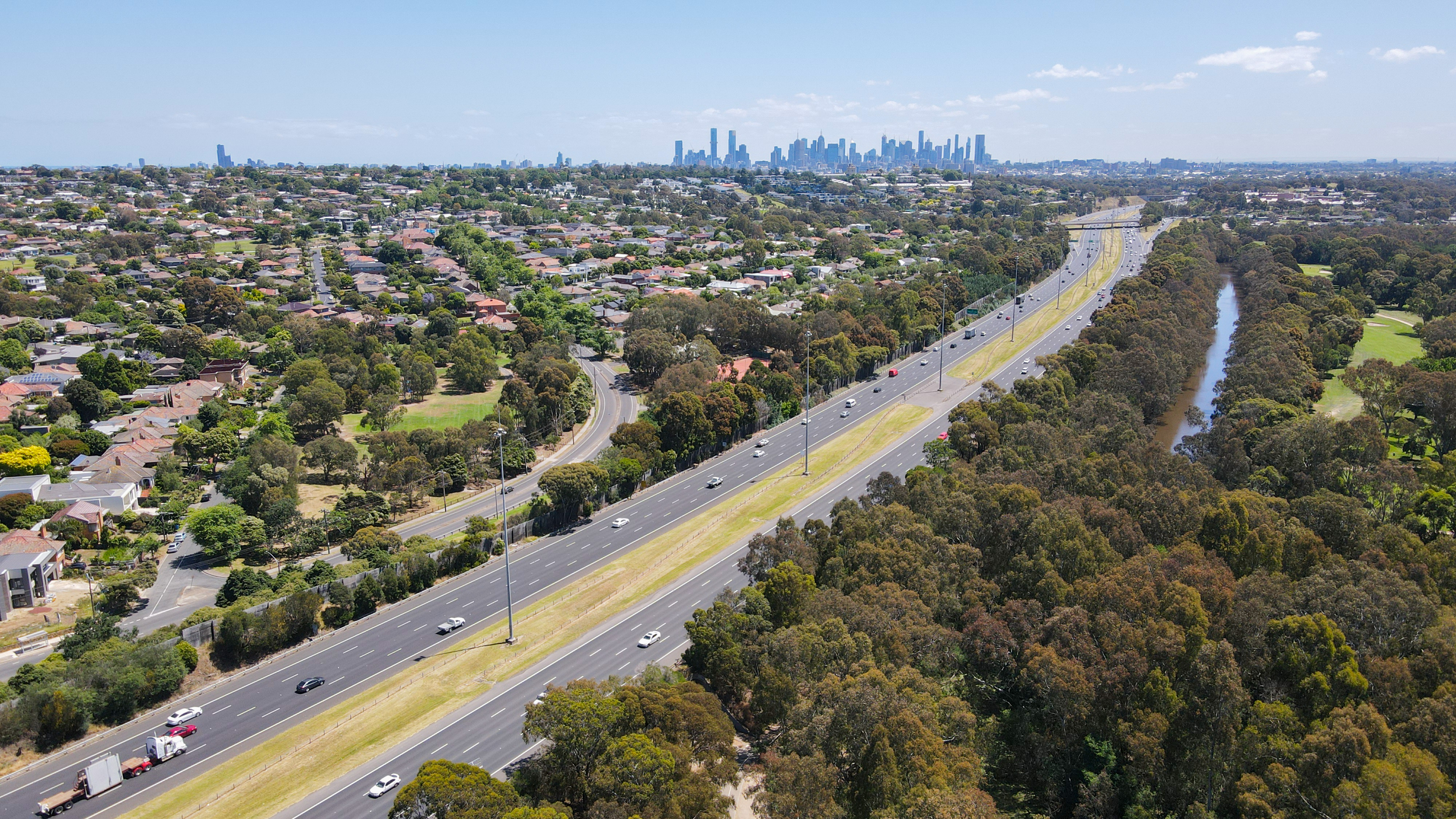
- Aerial view of the Eastern Freeway looking towards Melbourne CBD
- Coordinates: 37°47′39″S 144°59′22″E (West end); 37°48′14″S 145°10′42″E (East end)

General information
- Type: Freeway
- Length: 17.9 km (11 mi)
- Opened: 1977–1997
- Route number(s): (2008–present)
- Former route number: Freeway Route 83 (1977–1989) (Clifton Hill–Doncaster); Metro Route 83 (1989–2008) Entire route

Major junctions
- West end: Alexandra Parade; Collingwood, Melbourne
- Hoddle Street; Chandler Highway; Bulleen Road; Doncaster Road; Middleborough Road; Springvale Road
- East end: EastLink; Donvale, Melbourne

Location(s)
- LGA(s): City of Yarra; City of Boroondara; City of Manningham; City of Whitehorse
- Major suburbs / towns: Bulleen, Doncaster, Box Hill North

Highway system
- Highways in Australia; National Highway • Freeways in Australia; Highways in Victoria

The Eastern Freeway is an urban freeway in eastern Melbourne, the state capital of Victoria, Australia. It is one of the busiest freeways in the city, running in an east-west direction between the two major inner-urban arterial roads of Alexandra Parade and Hoddle Street, and the EastLink tollway. It is continually the widest freeway in Melbourne, with 12 lanes altogether at its western end. In other locations it consists of between six and 12 lanes. One of these lanes is reserved as an inbound transit lane reserved for vehicles with two or more occupants during peak hours west of Burke Road.

== Route ==
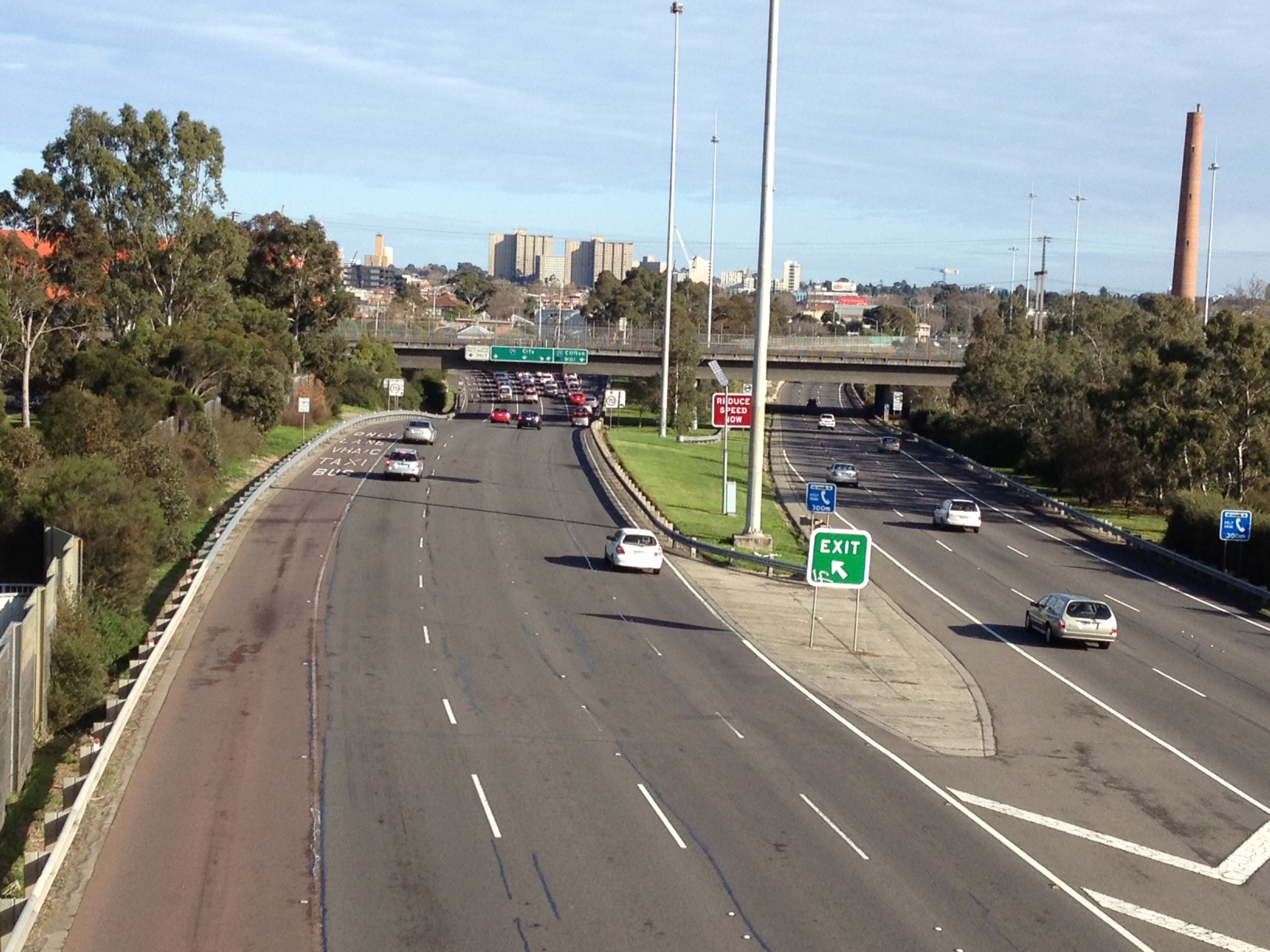
Hoddle Street exit viewed from the east

The Eastern Freeway starts at its junction with Hoddle Street, as an eastern continuation of Alexandra Parade, with six lanes eastbound and three lanes westbound. Three more lanes (that provide an exit to Hoddle Street) join the westbound carriageway after it leaves the junction, and after a short distance both directions narrow from six to five lanes in each direction. The freeway narrows again to four lanes in each direction near Chandler Highway and Yarra Bend.

The freeway narrows once more to three lanes just before Bulleen Road, and features a concrete barrier rather than the grassy median that was designed to carry a railway. There is a short four lane section between Tram and Blackburn Roads, then three lanes to the end at Springvale Road, and connects to the EastLink toll road to Ringwood and Frankston. The freeway was unique in that it did not connect to any other freeway prior to EastLink being built.

The travel time on the Eastern Freeway in each direction is 13 minutes: 5 minutes between Springvale Road and Doncaster Road, and 8 minutes between Doncaster Road and Hoddle Street). In peak period, travel time is between 16–26 minutes. However, during times of extreme congestion, including residual from an incident, the travel time can go well beyond half an hour.

The entire freeway has a 100 km/h (62 mph) speed limit. There are no fixed speed cameras, however Victoria Police regularly patrol the full length of the freeway to enforce the speed limit. VicRoads also operates a network of CCTV cameras across the entire length of the freeway and abnormal traffic movements by vehicles are reported to Victoria Police.

== History ==
Construction started on the first section of freeway between Hoddle Street, Clifton Hill and Bulleen Road Balwyn North in 1971 by the Melbourne and Metropolitan Board of Works (MMBW), but the project and its construction was transferred to be under the direct responsibility of the Country Roads Board on 1 July 1974; the section was opened in 1977. The central reservation was designed to be wide enough to cater for a proposed Doncaster railway line between Hoddle Street and Bulleen Road, bridges over it deliberately kept free of support pylons to allow for it. The bridges were designed by Melbourne engineer Bruce Day, with particular attention paid to the aesthetics of each bridge so that they fitted in their landscape, were related to one another, and also provided a variety and progression of design themes. Land was also reserved from Bulleen Road to Doncaster East to extend the proposed railway line, but the plan fell out of favour in the 1980s and the land was sold. The freeway was extended further south-east through Balwyn North from Bulleen Road to Doncaster Road and opened in 1982, with a major part being the undergrounding of 2.4 km of Koonung Creek in a precast reinforced concrete conduit to allow more room for the freeway. The freeway was extended for the last time to Donvale in December 1997.

The Eastern Freeway was signed as Freeway Route 83 between Alexandra Parade and Bulleen Road upon opening in 1977, then extended eastward to Doncaster Road when that section of freeway was opened in 1982; this was replaced by Metropolitan Route 83 in 1989, itself extended eastward to Donvale when that section of freeway was opened in 1997. With Victoria's conversion to the newer alphanumeric system in the late 1990s, it was replaced by route M3 when EastLink opened in 2008.

The passing of the Road Management Act 2004 granted the responsibility of overall management and development of Victoria's major arterial roads to VicRoads: in 2004, VicRoads re-declared Eastern Freeway (Freeway #1830) from Gold Street in Collingwood to Springvale Road in Donvale.

=== Timeline of construction ===
- 1977 – Initial stage, 9 km from Alexandra Parade to Bulleen Road, opened December 1977 in three stages: Hoddle Street to Chandler Highway; Chandler Highway to Burke Road; Burke Road to Bulleen Road; total cost (including associated works in Hoddle Street) of A$84 million.
- 1982 – Second stage, extended 3km from Bulleen Road to Doncaster Road, opened 3 June 1982, by Minister for Transport, the Hon S M Crabb MP. Two lanes in each direction, plus emergency stopping lanes, at a cost of $24 million.
- 1997 – Third stage, extended 7km from Doncaster Road to Springvale Road, opened December 1997, at a cost of $250 million. The sound barriers built in Stage 3 designed by architects Wood Marsh/Pels Innes Neilson Kosloff won the Australian Institute of Architects Victorian Architecture Medal and the national Walter Burley Griffin Award for Urban Design in 1998.

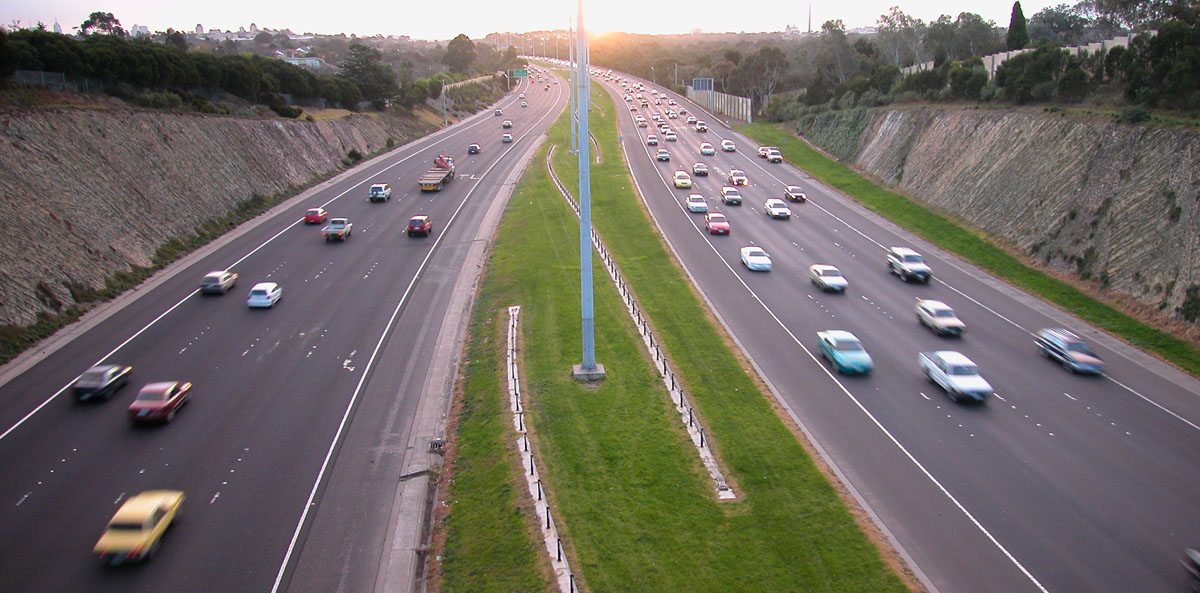
Eastern Freeway viewed facing the city at sunset from the Belford Road overpass, in Kew. The wide median, designed to accommodate a double-track railway, can be seen.

The first and second stages were controversial and met much opposition due to the first being constructed through the middle of Yarra Bend Park and the second stage to Doncaster Road through parkland now named Koonung Creek Reserve.

In recent years, amidst growing congestion problems and increased awareness of unsustainable methods of transport in Melbourne, there has been massive local council lobbying (by Melbourne, Yarra and Manningham) and public pressure placed on the State Government for the Doncaster railway line to be constructed.

One last 5km extension to the Eastern Freeway, to terminate at the intersection of Maroondah Highway and Mount Dandenong Road via the eastern half of the Ringwood Bypass in Ringwood, was planned in October 2000: this would include tunnels 1.5km in length and a connection with the planned Scoresby Freeway (later EastLink), cost $326 million, and was scheduled for completion in mid-2005. Instead, the Scoresby Freeway and the planned Eastern Freeway extension was merged into the Eastlink project, and the remainder of the Eastern Freeway reservation was built into the western half of the Ringwood Bypass, which opened in July 2008. Eastlink connected the freeway to the Monash, Mornington Peninsula and Frankston Freeways.

=== 1969 Melbourne Transportation Plan ===
Originally designated F-19 under the 1969 Melbourne Transportation Plan during its construction in the early 1970s, it was supposed to be linked to the then-new Tullamarine Freeway, as well as taking traffic off the Maroondah Highway. Protests from inner Melbourne suburbs residents led to it being terminated at Hoddle Street.

=== April 2020 crash ===
On 22 April 2020, a drunk truck driver, Mohinder Singh, crashed his truck into a Porsche 911 and two police cars. Four police officers in the police cars were killed. The driver of the Porsche, Richard Pusey, was also drunk and was later arrested for running away from the scene and for filming the dying police officers, later pleading guilty to three charges, and was jailed for 10 months.

On 14 April 2021, truck driver Singh was sentenced to at least 22 years in prison by the Supreme Court of Victoria over the manslaughter of four police officers.

== Safety ==
Despite the inherent danger in small and large vehicles travelling at high speeds, the freeway is generally considered one of the safest in Melbourne, with minimal changes of elevation, a flowing route, ample shoulder space and well-maintained safety barriers. Long sections of the freeway suffer from low lighting levels due to its route and proximity to residential areas.

In the seven years preceding and including 2009, six people died in a section of the freeway known as the Bulleen Bend. This is the tightest bend in the freeway's length, between the Bulleen and Doncaster Road interchanges. Despite the relatively tight bend and 100 km/h (62 mph) limit, there were few safety barriers on the extremities of the road surface, leaving nothing between the cars and the trees on the road shoulder. Flexible barriers were installed along lengths of the freeway in an attempt to improve safety. These measures reduced the relative risk of casualty crashes by approximately 75 percent.

== Widening and upgrades (North East Link) ==
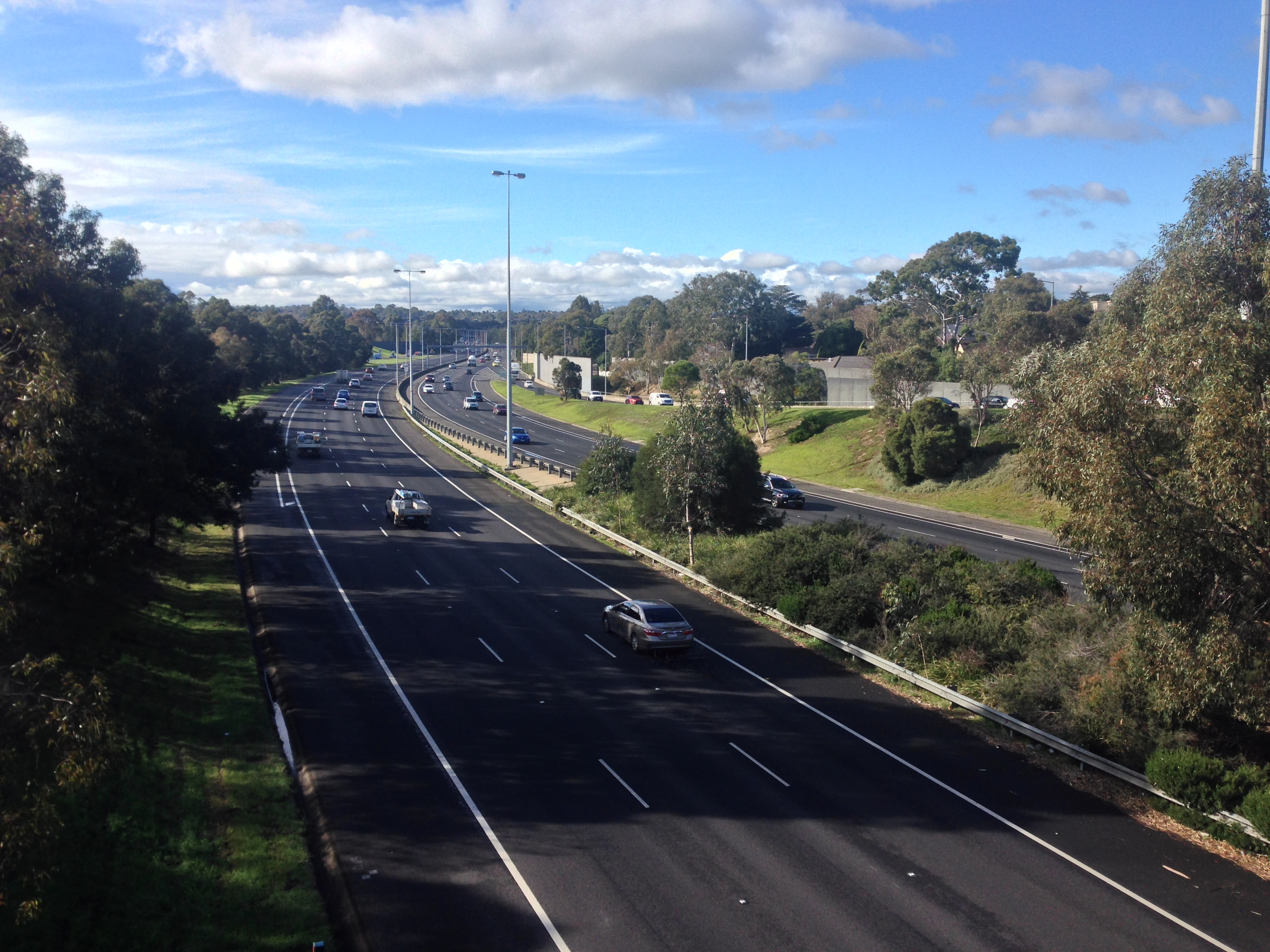
The Eastern Freeway viewed from Bulleen Road. The North East link will terminate at this location.

The Eastern Freeway is one of the primary freeways feeding into the CBD. Despite decades of road widenings and infrastructure investment, it experiences periods of traffic congestion. In 2016, the Victorian State Government announced plans to construct a new tolled freeway to connect to the Eastern Freeway. Termed the North East Link, the main component of the project is two tunnels connecting the M80 Ring Road in the north-eastern suburb of Greensborough to the Eastern Freeway at Bulleen Road in Balwyn North. It is anticipated to add up to 135,000 extra vehicles to the Eastern Freeway and surrounding suburbs every day.

One component of the project is widening the entire freeway from Hoddle Street to Springvale Road. 45 kilometres of new lanes will be added, including six 'express' lanes between Middleborough Road and the Chandler Highway. In some locations east of Bulleen Road, it will be more than doubled in width from nine lanes to 20 lanes, making it one of the widest roads in the world. Construction on the first section to be upgraded between Burke Road and Tram Road will begin in 2024 with the other stages to follow in 2025. The upgrade is anticipated to be completed by 2028 to coincide with the opening of the tunnels.

== Western extension (East West Link) ==
The Eastern Freeway has no connecting freeways at its western end in Clifton Hill. As a result, traffic from the Eastern Freeway is released westward along Alexandra Parade and north–south along Hoddle Street. There have been proposals to extend the freeway further west to connect with the CityLink network and ultimately to the Western Ring Road at Sunshine West, but none have been constructed to date.

On 1 March 2007, the Victorian Government announced a study linking the major freeways conducted by international transport expert Sir Rod Eddington. The Eddington Transport Report was released in early 2008 and outlined 20 main recommendations for the city, including a tunnel from the Eastern Freeway to CityLink under Royal Park. The newly elected state Liberal government announced in 2013 that they would commence construction of the tunnel. This announcement sparked heated public debate and protests both in favour and against the proposal until the newly elected Labor government renounced the contracts signed by the previous government in 2015 and scrapped the project.

One aspect of the East West Link proposal was to widen the Eastern Freeway between Hoddle Street and Tram Road in Doncaster. While the exact details of the proposal were not released before the project was abandoned, this was opposed by residents and councils along its length.

== Exits and interchanges ==
LGA	Location	km	mi	Destinations	Notes
Yarra	Collingwood–Clifton Hill boundary	0.0	0.0	Alexandra Parade (Metro Route 83 west) – Carlton, Parkville	Western freeway terminus: continues west as Alexandra Parade
Yarra	Collingwood–Abbotsford–Clifton Hill tripoint	0.35	0.22	Hoddle Street (Metro Route 29) - City, Richmond, Clifton Hill	
Boroondara	Kew	3.5	2.2	Chandler Highway (Metro Route 21) – Kew, Alphington	
Boroondara	Kew East–Balwyn North boundary	6.8	4.2	Burke Road (Metro Route 17) – Heidelberg, Camberwell, Caulfield	Eastbound exit and westbound entrance only
Boroondara	Balwyn North	8.2	5.1	North East Link – Greensborough	Under construction
Boroondara	Balwyn North	8.2	5.1	Bulleen Road (Metro Route 42 south) – Balwyn North; Bulleen Road (Metro Route 52 north) – Bulleen; Thompsons Road (Metro Route 42 north-east) – Templestowe	Eastbound entrance via Thompsons Road
Boroondara	Balwyn North	11.0	6.8	Doncaster Road (Metro Route 36) – Balwyn North, Doncaster	Future single point urban interchange
Manningham–Whitehorse boundary	Mont Albert North–Doncaster–Box Hill North tripoint	12.6	7.8	Elgar Road – Doncaster, Burwood	Eastbound exit and westbound entrance only
Manningham–Whitehorse boundary	Doncaster–Box Hill North boundary	13.3	8.3	Tram Road (Metro Route 47 north) – Doncaster; Station Street (Metro Route 47 south) – Box Hill	Westbound exit and eastbound entrance only
Manningham–Whitehorse boundary	Box Hill North–Blackburn North boundary	14.7	9.1	Middleborough Road (Metro Route 23 south) – Mount Waverley; Wetherby Road (Metro Route 23 north) – Templestowe	
Manningham–Whitehorse boundary	Blackburn North	16.3	10.1	Blackburn Road (Metro Route 13 north) – Warrandyte; Surrey Road (Metro Route 13 south) – Blackburn	Eastbound exit and westbound entrance only
Manningham–Whitehorse boundary	Nunawading–Donvale boundary	17.9	11.1	Springvale Road (Metro Route 40) – Donvale, Nunawading	Single point urban interchange
Manningham–Whitehorse boundary	Nunawading–Donvale boundary	17.9	11.1	EastLink (M3 east) – Ringwood, Frankston	Eastern freeway terminus, continues east as EastLink
Incomplete access; Route transition; Unopened

=== Freeway map ===
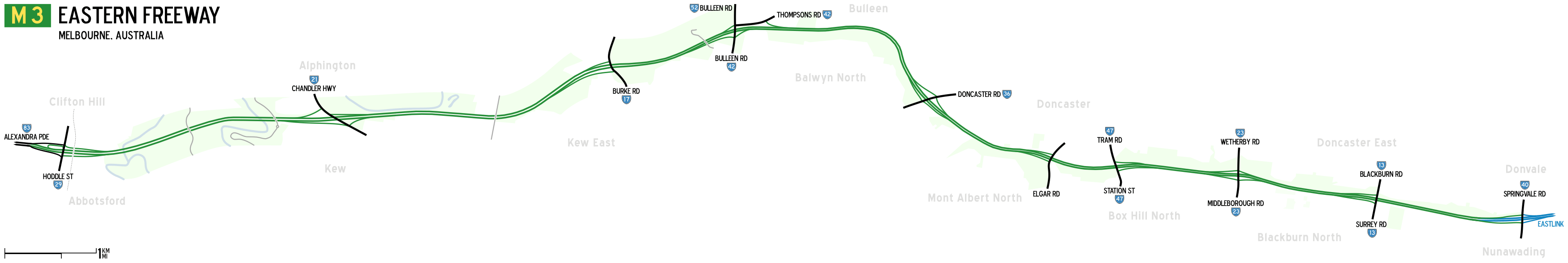

== See also ==
- Doncaster railway line
- Eastern Busway
- Freeways in Australia
- Freeways in Victoria
- Road transport in Victoria
