= Koonung =

Koonung may refer to:

- Koonung Creek, a small tributary of the Yarra River in the eastern suburbs of Melbourne, Victoria, Australia
- Koonung Province, an electorate of the Victorian Legislative Council, Victoria, Australia, 1992–2006
- Koonung Secondary College, a secondary state school in Mont Albert North, Victoria, Australia, in the eastern suburbs of Melbourne
- Koonung Creek Trail, a shared use path for cyclists and pedestrians, which follows Koonung Creek in the eastern suburbs of Melbourne, Victoria, Australia
