= Gawler Chain Trail =

Shared use path in Melbourne, Australia

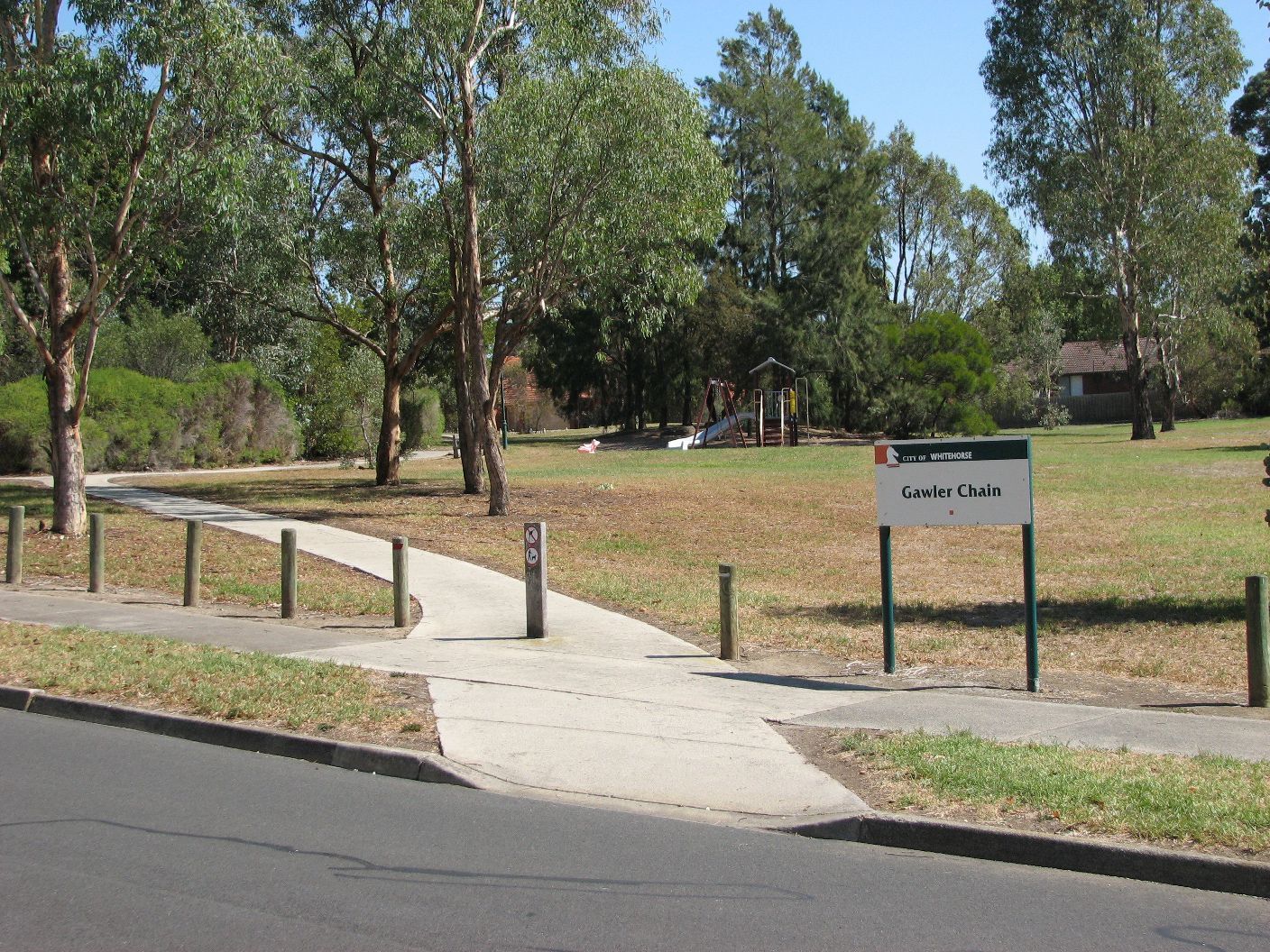
- Near Eastern End of the Trail
- Length: 2km
- Location: Melbourne, Victoria, Australia
- Difficulty: Easy
- Hazards: None
- Surface: Bitumen, compacted gravel and dirt
- Hills: Some near western end
- Water: None
- Train: Surrey Hills station
- Tram: 109

The Gawler Chain Trail is a shared use path for cyclists and pedestrians in the inner eastern suburb of Mont Albert in Melbourne, Victoria, Australia.

The trail has some short road sections and the western section is fairly rough.

== Following the Path ==
The trail starts at the corner of Arnott and Costello Streets. This section consists of a concrete path following an easement. It crosses several quiet streets. The concrete section ends at Strabane Avenue. Head to the right up Strabane Avenue and turn left into Kerry Parade then right into Madang Avenue. At the end, head through the laneway between the houses to Union Road. Turn right and after 100m, turn left into the easement. This part is fairly rough, with only a walking track and some fairly steep, short sections. Continue to the end at the intersection of Greythorn and Belmore Roads.

== Connections ==
Connects via a road section to the Bushy Creek Trail. At the eastern end, proceed down Arnott Street and turn left into Box Hill Crescent. Head past the rear of Koonung Secondary College to the end of the street. Cross Belmore Road and join the Bushy Creek Trail at the children's playground. The Koonung Creek Trail can also be accessed by crossing Belmore Road, and continuing north up Elgar Road, and into Elgar Park.

West end at 37.803961°S 145.096889°E East end at 37.802461°S 145.113628°E.
