= Elgar's Special Survey =

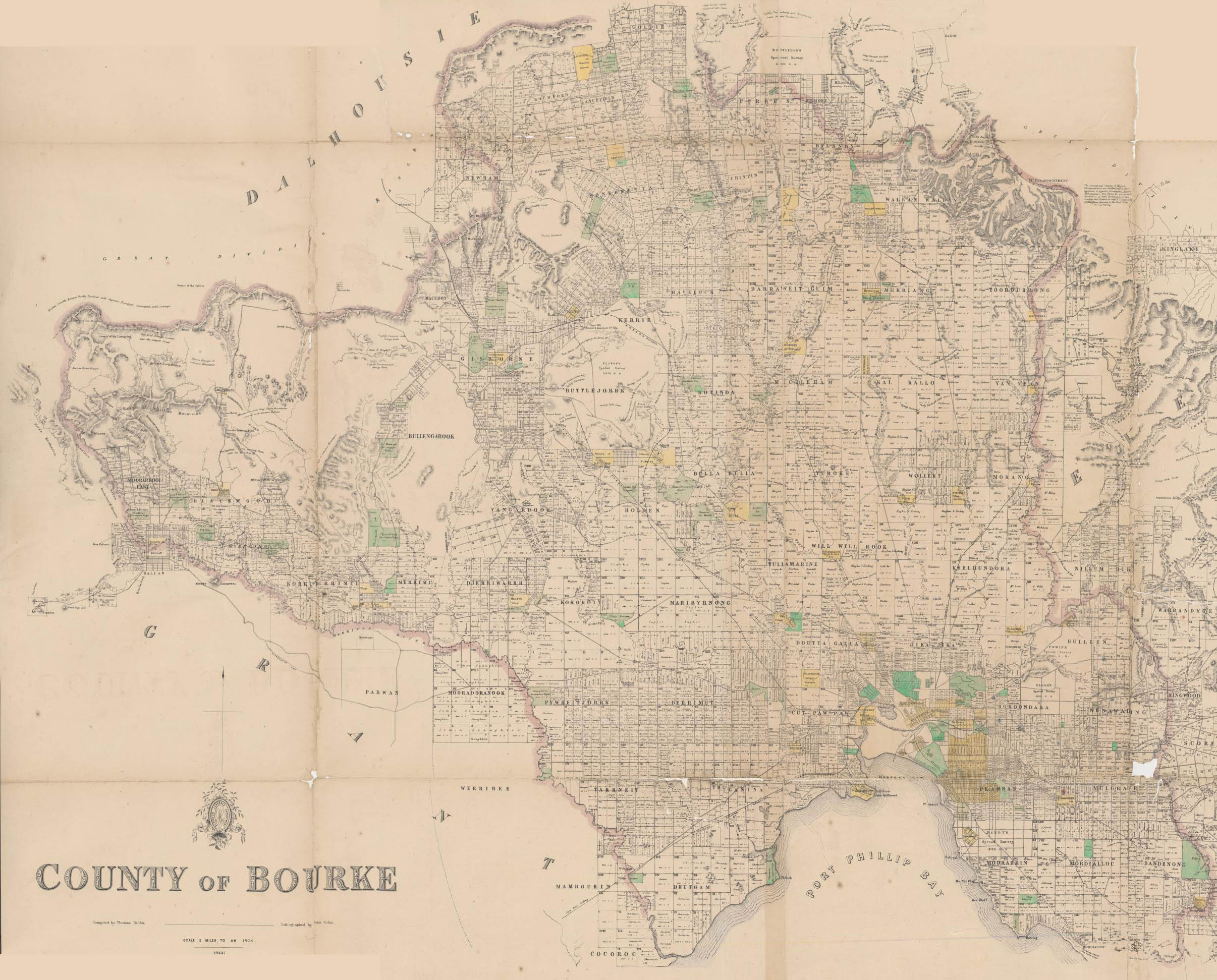
1866 map of County of Bourke. Elgar's Special Survey is in the Parish of Boroondara, east of Melbourne.

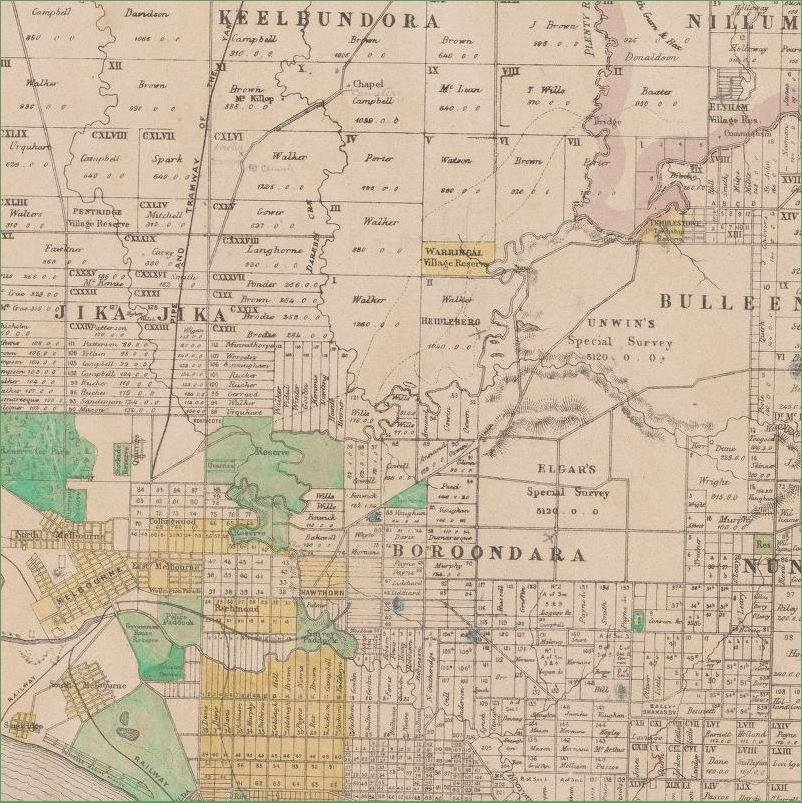
Portion of 1866 map of County of Bourke showing Elgar's and Unwin's Special Survey

In 1841, Henry Elgar purchased 5,120 acres (20.7 km^{2}) or eight square miles of land approximately 10 km east of Melbourne, Victoria, Australia. The land was purchased from the Crown for one pound an acre under the terms of the short-lived Special Survey regulations. The land was considered to be amongst the best land in Boroondara, especially given its convenient location near the established suburbs of Kew, Hawthorn and Camberwell.

Elgar's Special Survey covered the area now bounded by Burke Road (west), Canterbury Road (south), Elgar Road (east) and the Yarra River and Koonung Creek (north). It includes all of the Melbourne suburbs of Balwyn, Balwyn North, Mont Albert and Mont Albert North, and the parts of Canterbury and Surrey Hills north of Canterbury Road.

The land is in the parishes of Boroondara and Nunawading in the County of Bourke.

The Elgar's Special Survey had a lasting effect on the alignment of Boroondara subdivisions and roads as some boundaries did not conform to the one mile (1.6 km) interval cadastral survey Section lines running north–south and east–west, referenced from the survey datum at Batman's Hill. It is noted by the Australian Bureau of Statistics as being a particularly well known example of the short-lived special survey system.
