= Blackburn North =

- Suburb
- Interactive map of Blackburn North
- Coordinates: 37.810°S 145.152°E
- Country: Australia
- State: Victoria
- City: Melbourne
- LGA: City of Whitehorse
- Location: 17 km (11 mi) from Melbourne

Government
  - State electorates: Box Hill; Ringwood
  - Federal divisions: Deakin; Menzies

Area
  - Total: 2.6 km^{2} (1.0 sq mi)
- Elevation: 96 m (315 ft)

Population
  - Total: 7,627 (2021 census)
  - Density: 2,930/km^{2} (7,600/sq mi)
- Postcode: 3130
Suburbs around Blackburn North
Doncaster	Doncaster East	Donvale
Box Hill North	Blackburn North	Nunawading
Box Hill	Blackburn	Nunawading

Blackburn North (formerly North Blackburn) is a suburb of Melbourne, Victoria, Australia, 17 km east of Melbourne's Central Business District, located within the City of Whitehorse local government area. Blackburn North recorded a population of 7,627 at the 2021 census.

Blackburn North is a predominantly residential suburb, with wide green and leafy streets and houses on quarter acre blocks. The suburb had its start in the early 1960s, much of it being built on land formerly used as an apple orchard. North Blackburn Shopping Centre was originally known as Old Orchard Shopping Centre for this reason, as is Old Orchard Primary School today. North Blackburn Post Office opened on 2 May 1955 and was renamed Blackburn North around 1990.

Prior to the formation of the City of Whitehorse in 1994, Blackburn North was a part of the now defunct City of Nunawading.

== Industry ==
A small light industrial area is located in the north-east corner of the suburb, along Joseph Street. A former clay pipe factory on Springfield Road has been closed and replaced by housing.

== Shopping ==
No major shopping centre exists in Blackburn North. While it is well served by North Blackburn Square Shopping Centre on Springfield Road, it is in fact located in Blackburn. The large Westfield Doncaster is located in nearby Doncaster.

Box Hill Central, can also be found in Box Hill. It can be accessed through several buses, notably bus routes 270/271, which can also be taken in the opposite direction to Eastland Shopping Centre and other shopping locations.

Small strip shopping areas exist in Raymond Street, Katrina Street and Diana Drive.

== Transport ==
No railway station serves Blackburn North. However bus routes service the area.

These routes run through the suburb to the nearby public transport hub at Box Hill, where a bus terminus, tram terminus and Box Hill railway station can be found.

Other nearby train stations are Laburnum and Blackburn. Blackburn Station can be reached by bus from Blackburn North.

On its northern boundary is the Eastern Freeway, along which also runs a bicycle track, the Koonung Creek Trail. The northern boundary is also marked by Koonung Creek, which flows into the Yarra River further downstream. Exit the Freeway at Middleborough Road or Blackburn Road to best reach Blackburn North.

== Schools ==
There are two public primary schools in Blackburn North, Old Orchard Primary School and St. Philips (Catholic) on Junction Road. Whitehorse Primary school, which although is next door to St. Philips, is actually in neighbouring Nunawading.

Middlefield Primary School, formerly located on Verbena street, has now been torn down and replaced with housing. Its soccer pitch survives as part of Koonung Reserve. It amalgamated with Blackburn North Primary School in 1992 to form Old Orchard Primary School. Once located on Springfield Road, it has now also been replaced by housing on the new street of Kurrajong Way.

There is one secondary school located in Blackburn North. Blackburn High School can be found in across the road from North Blackburn Square, and was established in 1956. The former Blackburn Technical School has closed down, and since 1995, Old Orchard Primary School has used a portion of that site.

== Sport and recreation ==
The area is well serviced by Koonung Reserve, located on Springfield Road. It has cricket nets, a cricket/football oval, a tennis club and a soccer field. It is the sporting home of several cricket and football teams, including the Eastern Football League's Nunawading Football Club. Also situated in Blackburn North is Slater Reserve, home of the Blackburn Vikings Basketball Association competing in the VJBL for juniors and BigV for seniors.

== Notable residents ==
- Ronnie Biggs - In 1970, English fugitive Ronnie Biggs arrived in Australia while on the run from the UK authorities for his part in the Great Train Robbery of 1963. After a stint in Adelaide, he and his family settled in 52 Hibiscus Road, Blackburn North, under the assumed name of Cook. There the family briefly lived a normal life, before Biggs fled alone to Brazil the day before police raided his house. His subsequently ex-wife, Charmian, and children remained as lifelong Melbourne residents, albeit not in Blackburn North. Charmian Brent died in December 2014 in Melbourne.
- Dee Ryall - politician
- Ben Simmons - basketball player for the Brooklyn Nets of the National Basketball Association.

== See also ==
- City of Nunawading – Blackburn North was previously within this former local government area.
