= Box Hill North =

- Suburb
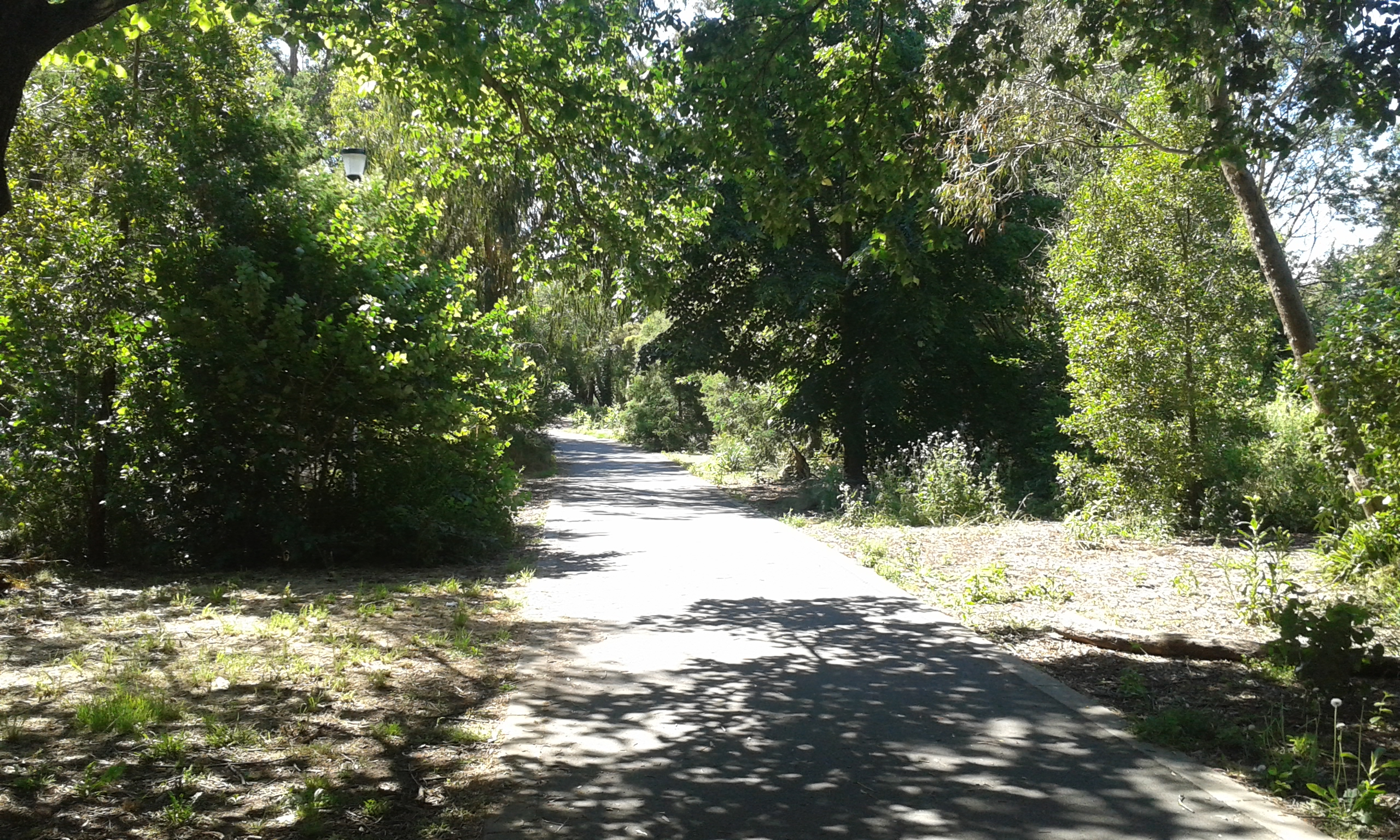
- The Bushy Creek Trail that travels through parkland to the north of the suburb.

- Interactive map of Box Hill North
- Coordinates: 37.807°S 145.12°E
- Country: Australia
- State: Victoria
- City: Melbourne
- LGA: City of Whitehorse
- Location: 14 km (8.7 mi) from Melbourne

Government
  - State electorate: Box Hill
  - Federal division: Menzies

Area
  - Total: 4 km^{2} (1.5 sq mi)

Population
  - Total: 12,337 (2021 census)
  - Density: 3,100/km^{2} (8,000/sq mi)
- Postcode: 3129
Suburbs around Box Hill North
Doncaster	Doncaster	Doncaster East
Mont Albert North	Box Hill North	Blackburn North
Mont Albert	Box Hill	Blackburn

Box Hill North is a suburb of Melbourne, Victoria, Australia, 14 km east from the Melbourne central business district, located within the City of Whitehorse local government area. Box Hill North recorded a population of 12,337 at the 2021 census.

Box Hill North's boundaries are Koonung Creek in the north, Elgar Road in the west, Middleborough Road in the east, and Thames Street in the south. The eastern part of Box Hill North is also known as Kerrimuir.

In the 12-month period to January 2020, Box Hill North reported a median house price of A$1.03 million for a three bedroom house.

== History ==
=== Early settlement ===
The earliest permanent European presence in the area was Arundel Wrighte's pastoral lease, established in 1838. A Wesleyan Methodist Chapel was built of local stone in 1858 and is the oldest building in the area.

=== Post-war development ===
Although central Box Hill was established in 1861, Box Hill North was largely developed and organised as a suburban area following the Second World War during a period of suburbanisation and development of its capabilities as a residential neighbourhood. Prior to the end of World War II, much of the area remained rural and mostly filled with orchards and dairy farms. As the post-war boom bought further reorganisation and development opportunities, corresponding local public services were developed. The Kerrimuir Post Office opened on 1 April 1955 and Box Hill North Post Office opened on 1 August 1955 as the population increased, requiring more dedicated postal services to meet the demands of an increasing population.

== Demographics ==
At the 2021 Australian census, there is recorded a total population of 12,337 people. At the 2011 Australian census, there was a recorded total population of 10,971 people, wherein 11.2% of residents reported being born in China.

== Shopping ==
Box Hill North has many shopping areas at the following locations;

- The corner of Station Street and Woodhouse Grove
- The corner of Elgar Road and Woodhouse Grove
- The corner of Middleborough Road and Springfield Road
- Trawool Street, between Dorking Road and Tynong Street
- Second Avenue, between Toogoods Rise and Cherry Orchard Rise

A better array of shops are just up the road by bus to Box Hill Central in the south, the Westfield owned Westfield Doncaster in the north and North Blackburn Shopping Centre to the east.

Box Hill North has a light industrial area in Lexton Street, at the Middleborough Road end of the street. It includes hot food snack bars open during weekday business hours to service the light industrial businesses and several shops and factory outlets.

== Education ==
Box Hill North has two public primary schools; Kerrimuir Primary School and Box Hill North Primary School and Kindergarten. Another school, St Clare's Catholic Primary School, closed down in the early 2000s.

The suburb has one independent specialist secondary school, The Berengarra School, for students with social or emotional difficulties, on the old site of St Clare's Catholic Primary School. Koonung Secondary College, Box Hill High School and Blackburn High School are in the neighbouring suburbs of Mont Albert North, Box Hill and Blackburn North respectively.

== Transport ==
The major north–south roads in Box Hill North are (from east–west); Elgar Road, Station Street, Dorking Road and Middleborough Road. Major east–west roads include (from north–south); Eastern Freeway, Woodhouse Grove, Wimmera Street/Springfield Road and Thames/Margaret Street.

The closest train station is Box Hill, located underneath Box Hill Central in Box Hill. The station is located on both the Belgrave and Lilydale lines.

Buses run on Elgar Road, Station Street, Dorking Road and Middleborough Road, as well as various side streets.

Routes on Elgar Road;

- Route 281 – Templestowe to Deakin University
- Route 293 – Greensborough station to Box Hill
- Route 302 – Lonsdale Street to Box Hill
- Route 304 – Lonsdale Street to Westfield Doncaster (Belmore Road to Eastern Freeway only)

Routes on Station Street;

- SmartBus Route 903 – Altona station to Mordialloc station

Routes on Dorking Road;

- Route 270 – Box Hill to Mitcham station

Routes on Middleborough Road;

- Route 279 -–Box Hill to Doncaster
- Route 303 -–City (Queen Street) to Ringwood North

Routes on side streets;

- Route 612 – Box Hill to Chadstone Shopping Centre

== Sports clubs ==
- East Box Hill Cricket Club
- Box Hill North Football Club Inc
- Whitehorse Pioneers Football Club Inc
- SFX Whitehorse Colts Junior Football Club Inc
- North Box Hill Tennis Club (NBHTC)(Frank Sedgman Reserve)
- Elgar Park Cricket Club (Previously Box Hill Church of Christ Cricket Club)
- Box Hill North Cricket Club
- Kerrimuir United Cricket Club
- Eastern Gymnastics Club (Previously Box Hill Gymnastics Club)
- Box Hill Little Athletics Centre
- Whitehorse Pole Vault Club
- Koonung Comets Basketball Club

== Parkland ==
There are many parks in the suburb, including Elgar Park, Bushy Creek Park, Memorial Park, Springfield Park, Tassell's Park, Frank Sedgman Reserve, Hagenauer Reserve, Halligan Park, Eram Park as well as many smaller, often unnamed, reserves. Of these, only Elgar Park and Springfield Park contain an Australian rules football oval. Most of these parks have walking and bicycle paths and children's playgrounds.

As well as this, there is two multi purpose tracks run through the suburb. The Bushy Creek Trail runs from the intersection at Elgar Road and Belmore Road, near Elgar Park, to the intersection at Dorking Road and Wimmera Street, near Springfield Park. The Koonung Creek Trial also runs through the north of the suburb, connecting it with neighbouring suburbs, such as Mont Albert North, Blackburn North, Nunawading, and Balwyn North.

== Religion ==
The residents of Box Hill North profess several religions, although the majority are either Christian or non-religious. There are five churches in the suburb;

- Manningham Uniting Church - Woodhouse Grove
- St Clare Catholic Church - corner of Woodhouse Grove and Killara Street
- GO Evangelical Church - Elgar Road
- True Jesus Church - corner of Watts Street and Medway Street
- St Philip's Anglican Church - Lawford Street

== See also ==
- City of Box Hill – Box Hill North was previously within this former local government area.
