= Bushy Creek Trail =

Path for cyclists and pedestrians in Melbourne, Australia

- Trail east of Elgar Road
- Length: About 3km
- Location: Melbourne, Victoria, Australia
- Difficulty: Easy
- Hazards: None
- Surface: Bitumen and compacted gravel
- Hills: None
- Water: None
- Train: Laburnum station

The Bushy Creek Trail is a shared use path for cyclists and pedestrians in the inner eastern suburb of Box Hill North in Melbourne, Victoria, Australia.

The trail has some short road sections including an unshared path along Springfield Road.

== Route ==
The trail starts from the Koonung Creek Trail. Look for the signpost just east of the Koonung Creek Wetlands area and the spectacular red freeway bridge. The first part of the trail is gravel and follows the Bushy Creek channel to a playground near Belmore Road. Branch off here for the Gawler Chain Trail (see Connections). The Bushy Creek Trail continues to the left past the Box Hill Miniature Steam Railway. Cross Elgar Road at the lights at the end of Belmore Road and head through the church car park opposite, through the opening in the wooden rail fence (see photo). The path is bitumen from here on. The actual Bushy Creek after which the trail is named runs underground below the trail corridor and is visible in two sections under grates flowing northwest.

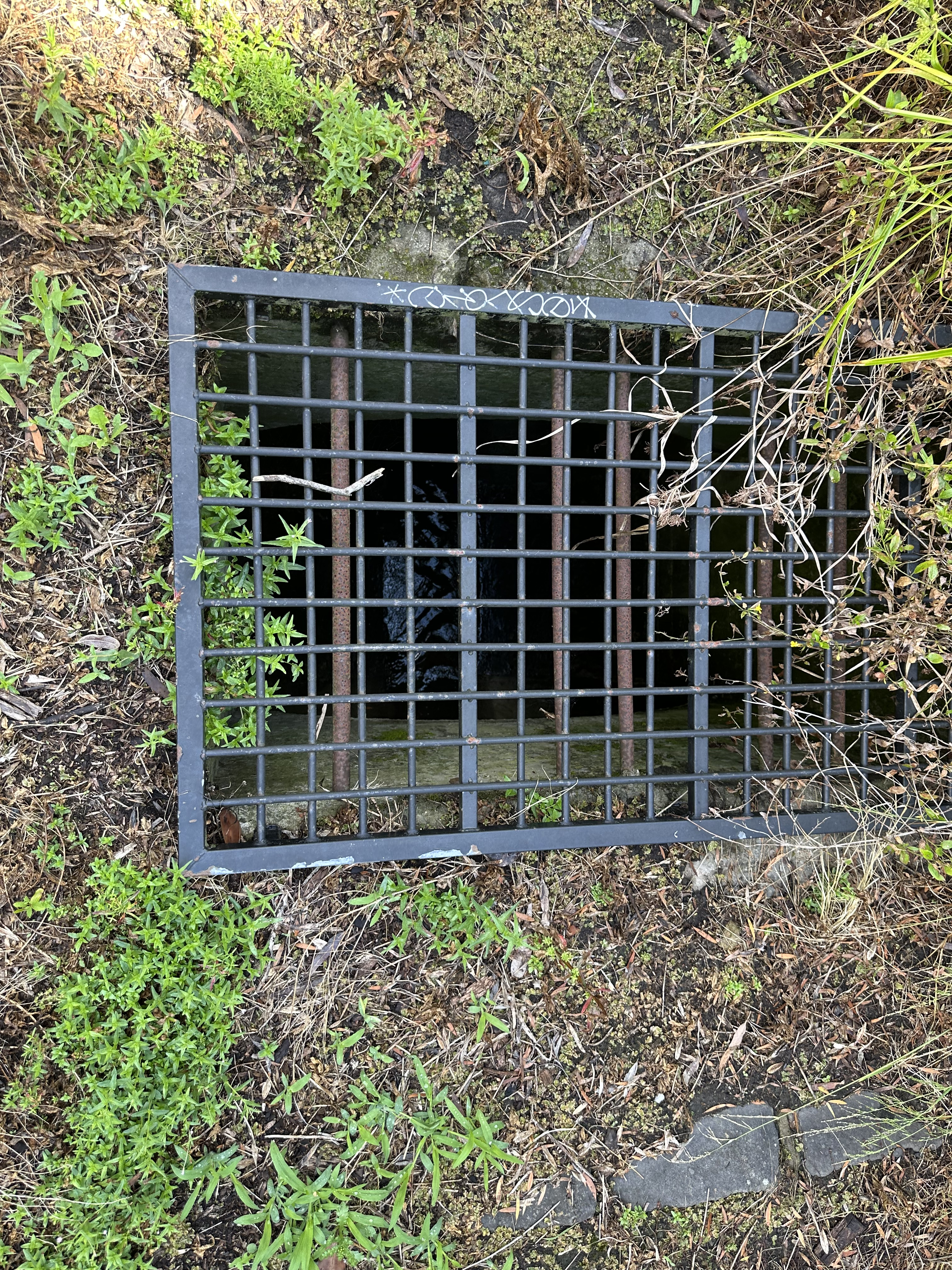
Bushy Creek flowing underground along Bushy Creek Trail

The trail follows an easement crossing several roads. There are two unclear forks in the path - keep right at each. Pedestrian lights at Station Street help with this busy road. Look for the wooden bus shelter on the eastern side of Station Street that marks the site of the first Electric Tram Depot (1889 - 1896). At Station Street there is a remnant Australian bushland preserve with native plants which is along the trail.

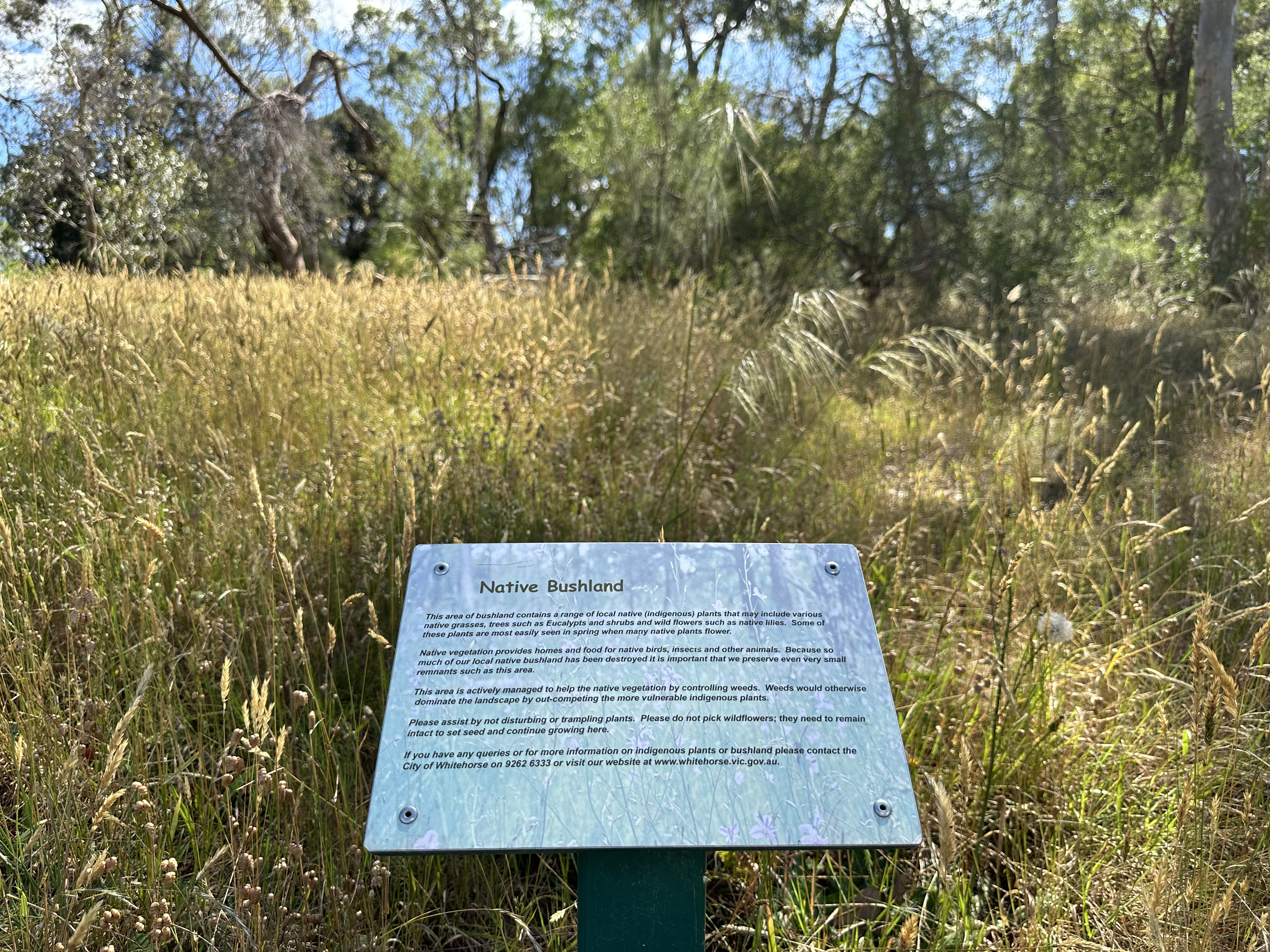
Sign describing native, Australian bushland at preserve along Bushy Creek Trail

At Dorking Road, the bushy area ends. The trail continues along Springfield Road as segregated pedestrian and bike paths on the nature strip nearly to Middleborough Road where the trail ends.

== Connections ==
The Koonung Creek Trail can be accessed from the northern end of the trail. The start of the Gawler Chain Trail is near the Belmore Road playground. Cross Belmore Road and proceed up Box Hill Crescent behind Koonung Secondary College. Turn right at the second street - Arnott Street - and 150 metres up, the trail starts in a small park on the left on a street corner.

To access the Box Hill to Ringwood Rail Trail, turn south at the Dorking Road intersection, continuing to the Maroondah Highway. Turn right and cross the highway, and continue down Linsley Street to access the trail.

At the end of the trail, head north down Middleborough Rd for 1.4 km to rejoin the Koonung Creek Trail.

West end at 37.796215°S 145.113950°E. East end at 37.809053°S 145.140480°E.
