= Koonung Creek =

Coordinates: 37°47′12″S 145°06′17″E

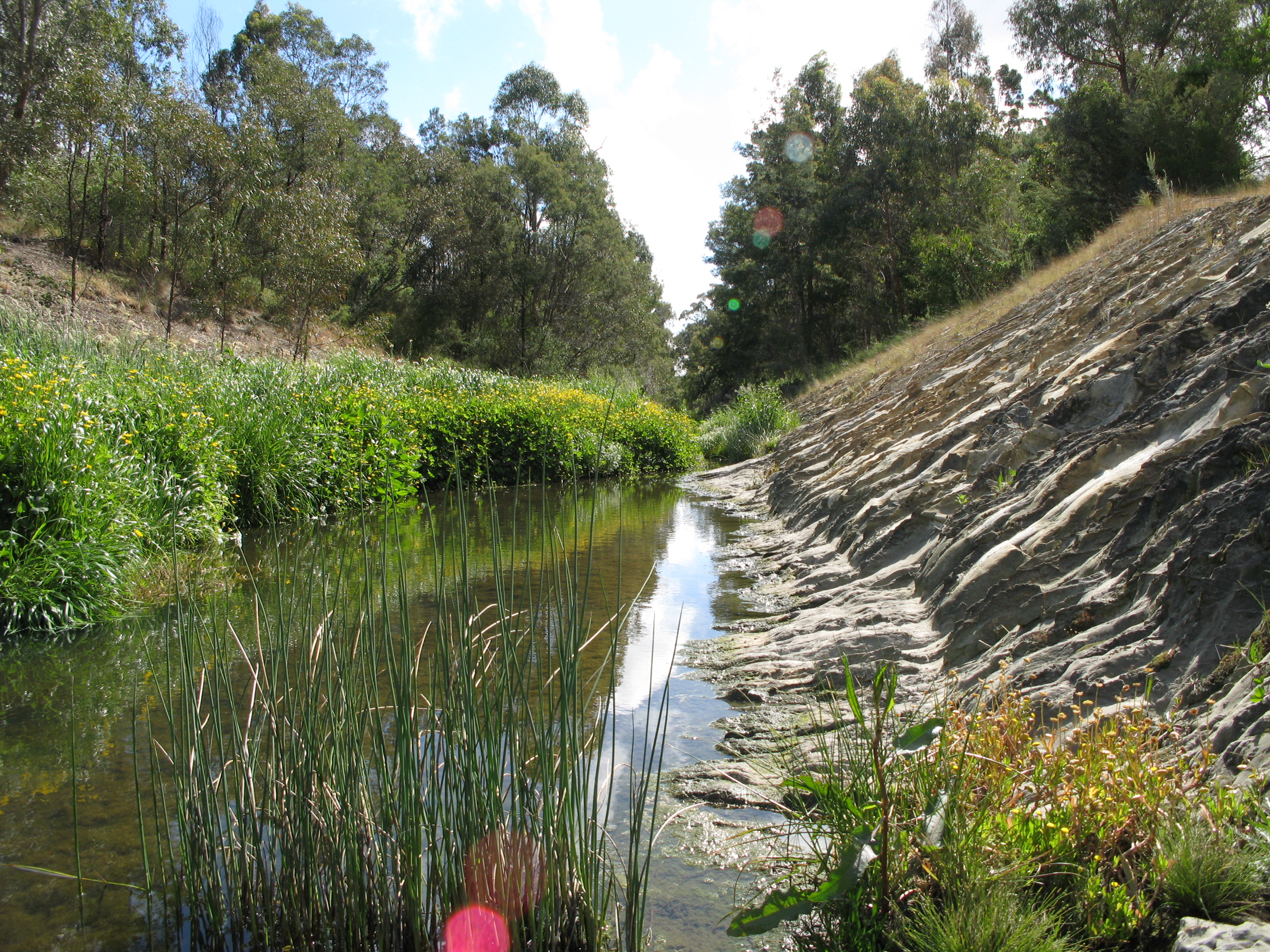
- Koonung Creek, downstream from Blackburn Road, showing realignment works on the right

Location
- Country: Australia
- State: Victoria

Physical characteristics
- Length: 11 km (6.8 mi)
- Basin size: Unknown

Koonung Creek (or Koonung Koonung Creek) is a small tributary of the Yarra River in Melbourne's east. The creek originates in Nunawading near Springvale Road, and flows to join the Yarra at the border between Ivanhoe East, Bulleen and Balwyn North. The place the two waterways meet forms the borders between these suburbs. Bushy Creek (now carried by an underground pipe) is a tributary to the creek, joining near Elgar Park in Mont Albert North. A shared use path follows the course of the creek (and therefore also the Freeway), known as the Koonung Creek Trail.

Melbourne Water rates the condition of the creek as 'Very Poor'. Also according to Melbourne Water, the river is the unhealthiest waterway in Melbourne. Melbourne Water's monitoring station for the creek at Bulleen Road in Bulleen, detected an average E. coli count of 1800, this is nine times the safe swimming level (200). This was the highest level of E. coli measured in all of metropolitan Melbourne's waterways. The poor condition of the creek has been evident from the earliest days of European settlement.

Five species of frog call the creek home, these are the Common eastern froglet, the Spotted Marsh Frog, the Striped Marsh Frog, the Eastern or Pobblebonk Frog and the Southern Brown or Ewing's Tree Frog. The Eastern Freeway follows the path of the creek within the band of parkland that adjoins the creek over its entire length.

== Geography ==
The creek's headwaters meet near the borders of Nunawading and Donvale, 21 km east of Melbourne. From here, the creek flows in a roughly westerly direction for around 11 km, before reaching the Yarra River below the Yarra Flats in southern Bulleen. The creek is joined by various gullies and creeks, the most prominent of the tributaries include; St Clems Gully, Bushy Creek and Gawler/Lungren Gully.

=== Geographic Features ===
- Boronia Grove Wetlands
- Doncaster Hill
- Other various wetlands & billabongs

=== Settlements ===
Approximately 80–90,000 people live in the creek's catchment area. Most settlements are extensions of suburban areas down the Koonung Creek Valley, with Doncaster and Balwyn North being notable exceptions. The settlements located along its course are listed below, from downstream to upstream;

- Southern Bulleen – 5,000~
- Balwyn North – 20,000

Bellvue
Greythorn

- Doncaster – 18,000
- Mont Albert North – 5,000
- Box Hill North – 10,000

Kerrimuir

- Southern Doncaster East – 7,500~
- Blackburn North – 6,800
- Southern Donvale – 2,000~
- Northern Nunawading – 5,000~

== Crossings ==
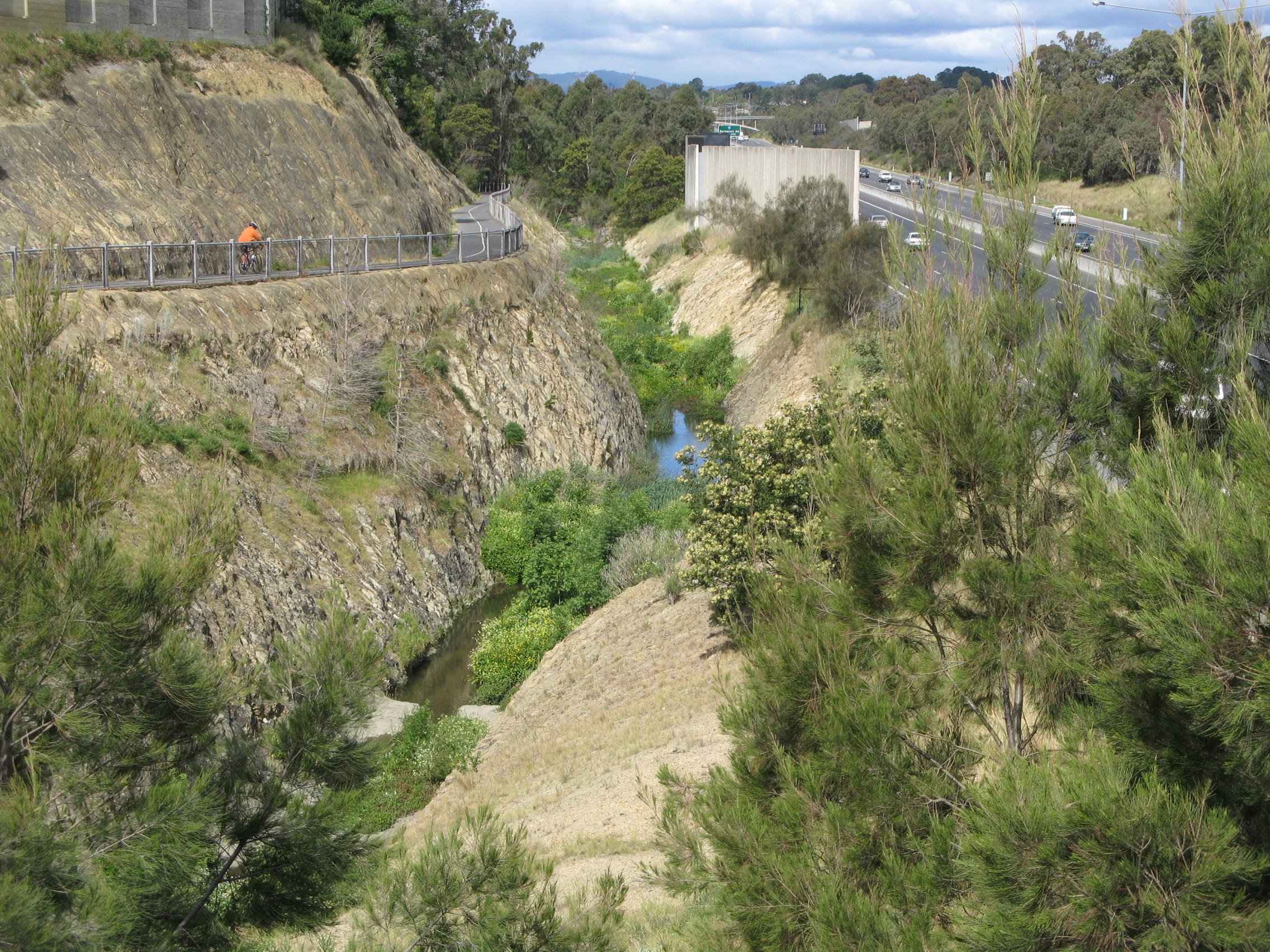
The Koonung Creek (center) since its diversion for the construction of the Eastern Freeway (right) and the Koonung Creek Trail (left)

- Freeway Golf Course Footbridge
- Bulleen Road
- Thompsons Road
- Eastern Freeway
- Doncaster Road (creek tunnel)
- Elgar Park Footbridge
- Elgar Road
- Tram Road
- Wetherby Road
- Eastern Freeway
- Boronia Grove Footbridges
- Blackburn Road (creek tunnel, 1995)
- Koonung Creek Park Footbridges
- Springvale Road
- Eastern Freeway

== Other information ==
Koonung Creek lends its name to many things, including many local streets and roads;

- Koonung Park, Blackburn North and the Koonung Park Tennis Centre
- Koonung Road, Blackburn North
- Koonung Creek Reserve
- The Koonung Ward in the local government area of the City of Manningham
- The Koonung Creek Trail
- Koonung Secondary College
- Koonung Heights Cricket Club

== See also ==
- Yarra River
- Mullum Mullum Creek
- Kooyongkoot Creek
- List of reduplicated Australian place names
