= City of Whitehorse =

Coordinates: 37°50′S 145°09′E

- Local government area
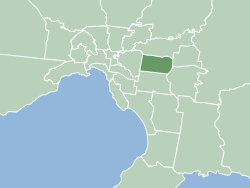
- Map of Melbourne showing City of Whitehorse
- Interactive map of City of Whitehorse
- Country: Australia
- State: Victoria
- Region: Greater Melbourne
- Established: 15 December 1994
- Council seat: Nunawading

Government
  - Mayor: Cr Andrew Davenport
  - State electorates: Ashwood; Box Hill; Glen Waverley; Ringwood
  - Federal divisions: Chisholm; Deakin; Menzies

Area
  - Total: 64.2 km^{2} (24.8 sq mi)

Population
  - Total: 183,462 (2024)
  - Density: 2,854.1/km^{2} (7,392/sq mi)
- Website: City of Whitehorse
LGAs around City of Whitehorse
Manningham	Manningham	Maroondah
Boroondara	City of Whitehorse	Maroondah
Boroondara	Monash	Knox

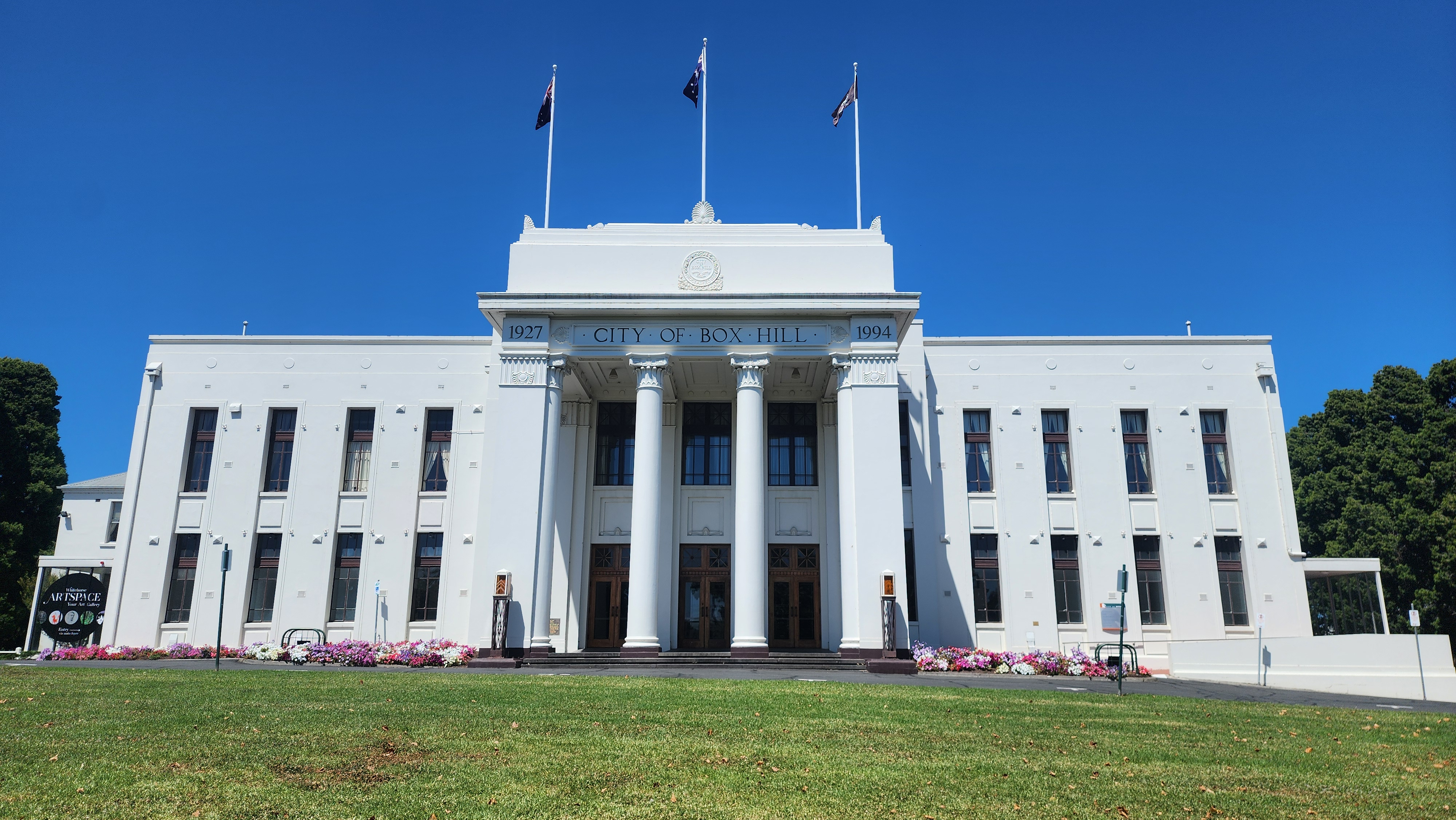
Box Hill Town Hall.

The City of Whitehorse is a local government area in Victoria, Australia in the eastern suburbs of Melbourne. It has an area of 64.2 km^{2} (25 sq mi) and an estimated residential population of 183,462 as of June 2024.

== History ==
The City of Whitehorse was created in December 1994 following the amalgamation of the City of Box Hill and the City of Nunawading, which shared a boundary along Middleborough Road. Earlier plans to form a smaller City of Whitehorse by merging the City of Box Hill and the eastern part of the City of Camberwell were not followed through.

The municipality derives its name and logo from The White Horse Hotel, a popular coaching inn located on the corner of Elgar Road and Whitehorse Road. After its demolition in 1933, the Council acquired the horse and porch from the hotel, and they were erected on Whitehorse Road. In 1986, the monument was relocated to Box Hill Town Hall and a replica was erected in its place.

== Council ==
The City of Whitehorse is divided into eleven wards: Cootamundra, Eley, Elgar, Kingsley, Lake, Mahoneys, Simpson, Sparks, Terrara, Walker and Wattle. One Councillor is elected to represent each ward, every four years. Council elections are conducted by postal voting and votes are counted using preferential voting. Voting is compulsory for residents who are on the electoral roll for state elections, but voters aged 70 years or over are not obliged to vote at local council elections. The Mayor and Deputy Mayor are elected by the Councillors to serve as the principal ambassador for the city for a twelve-month term.

The current council was elected in November 2024, and its composition is:

Party	Councillors
Independent	7
Independent Liberal	2
Independent Labor	2
Total	11

2020 and 2024 ward boundaries. Expand the map and click on a ward to see the ward name.

Ward	Party	Councillor	Notes
Cootamundra	Independent Labor	Kieran Simpson	
Eley	Independent	Daniel Griffiths	
Elgar	Independent	Blair Barker	Mayor
Kingsley	Independent Liberal	Kirsten Langford	
Lake	Independent Labor	Hayley Weller	Deputy Mayor
Mahoneys	Independent	Jason Martin	
Simpson	Independent	Prue Cutts	
Sparks	Independent	Peter Allan	
Terrara	Independent	Jarrod Gunn	
Walker	Independent	Ben Stennett	
Wattle	Independent Liberal	Andrew Davenport	

== Past councillors ==
=== 2000−2020 (multi-member wards) ===
Whitehorse comprised five two-member wards until 2020, when they were replaced by single-member wards.

Year	Central		Elgar		Morack		Riversdale		Springfield	
Year	Councillor	Councillor	Councillor	Councillor	Councillor	Councillor	Councillor	Councillor	Councillor	Councillor
2000	Jessie McCallum (Ind)	Peter Allan (Ind)	Bernie Millane (Ind)	Robert Chong (Ind)	Bill Bowie (Ind)	Noel Spurr (Ind)	Helen Buckingham (Ind)	Richard Anderson (Ind)	Chris Aubrey (Ind)	Kaele Way (Ind)
2003	Jessie McCallum (Ind)	Peter Allan (Ind)	Bernie Millane (Ind)	Robert Chong (Ind)	Bill Bowie (Ind)	George Droutsas (Ind)	Sharon Ellis (Ind)	John Koutras (Ind)	Chris Aubrey (Ind)	Sharon Patridge (Ind)
2004	Haley Weller (Ind)	Peter Allan (Ind)	Bernie Millane (Ind)	Robert Chong (Ind)	Bill Bowie (Ind)	George Droutsas (Ind)	Sharon Ellis (Ind)	John Koutras (Ind)	Chris Aubrey (Ind)	Sharon Patridge (Ind)
2005	Haley Weller (Ind)	Peter Allan (Ind)	Helen Harris (Ind)	Robert Chong (Ind)	Bill Bowie (Ind)	George Droutsas (Ind)	Sharon Ellis (Ind)	John Koutras (Ind)	Chris Aubrey (Ind)	Pauline Richards (Labor)
2006	Haley Weller (Ind)	Peter Allan (Ind)	Helen Harris (Ind)	Robert Chong (Ind)	Bill Bowie (Ind)	George Droutsas (Ind)	Sharon Ellis (Ind)	John Koutras (Ind)	Chris Aubrey (Ind)	Ben Stennett (Ind)
2008	Andrew Munroe (Liberal)	Bill Pemberton (Ind)	Helen Harris (Ind)	Robert Chong (Ind)	Mark Lane (Liberal)	Raylene Carr (Ind)	Sharon Ellis (Ind)	John Koutras (Ind)	Phillip Daw (Ind)	Ben Stennett (Ind)
2012	Andrew Munroe (Liberal)	Denise Massoud (Liberal)	Helen Harris (Ind)	Robert Chong (Ind)	Bill Bennett (Ind)	Raylene Carr (Ind)	Sharon Ellis (Ind)	Andrew Davenport (Liberal)	Phillip Daw (Ind)	Ben Stennett (Ind)
2016	Andrew Munroe (Liberal)	Denise Massoud (Liberal)	Tanya Tescher (Liberal)	Tina Liu (Ind)	Bill Bennett (Ind)	Raylene Carr (Ind)	Sharon Ellis (Ind)	Andrew Davenport (Liberal)	Prue Cutts (Ind)	Ben Stennett (Ind)
2017	Andrew Munroe (Liberal)	Denise Massoud (Liberal)	Blair Barker (Liberal)	Tina Liu (Ind)	Bill Bennett (Ind)	Raylene Carr (Ind)	Sharon Ellis (Ind)	Andrew Davenport (Liberal)	Prue Cutts (Ind)	Ben Stennett (Ind)

== Townships and localities ==
The 2021 Census counted 169,346 residents in the City of Whitehorse, up from 162,078 in the 2016 Census.

Population
Locality	2016	2021
Balwyn North^	20,406	21,302
Blackburn	13,940	14,478
Blackburn North	7,436	7,627
Blackburn South	10,793	10,939
Box Hill	11,395	14,353
Box Hill North	11,874	12,337
Box Hill South	8,434	8,491
Burwood^	15,019	15,147
Burwood East	10,273	10,675
Forest Hill	10,626	10,780
Mitcham	16,148	16,795
Mont Albert^	4,840	4,948
Mont Albert North	5,503	5,609
Nunawading^	11,876	12,413
Surrey Hills^	13,605	13,655
Vermont^	10,442	10,993
Vermont South	11,678	11,954

^ - Territory divided with another LGA

== Major thoroughfares ==
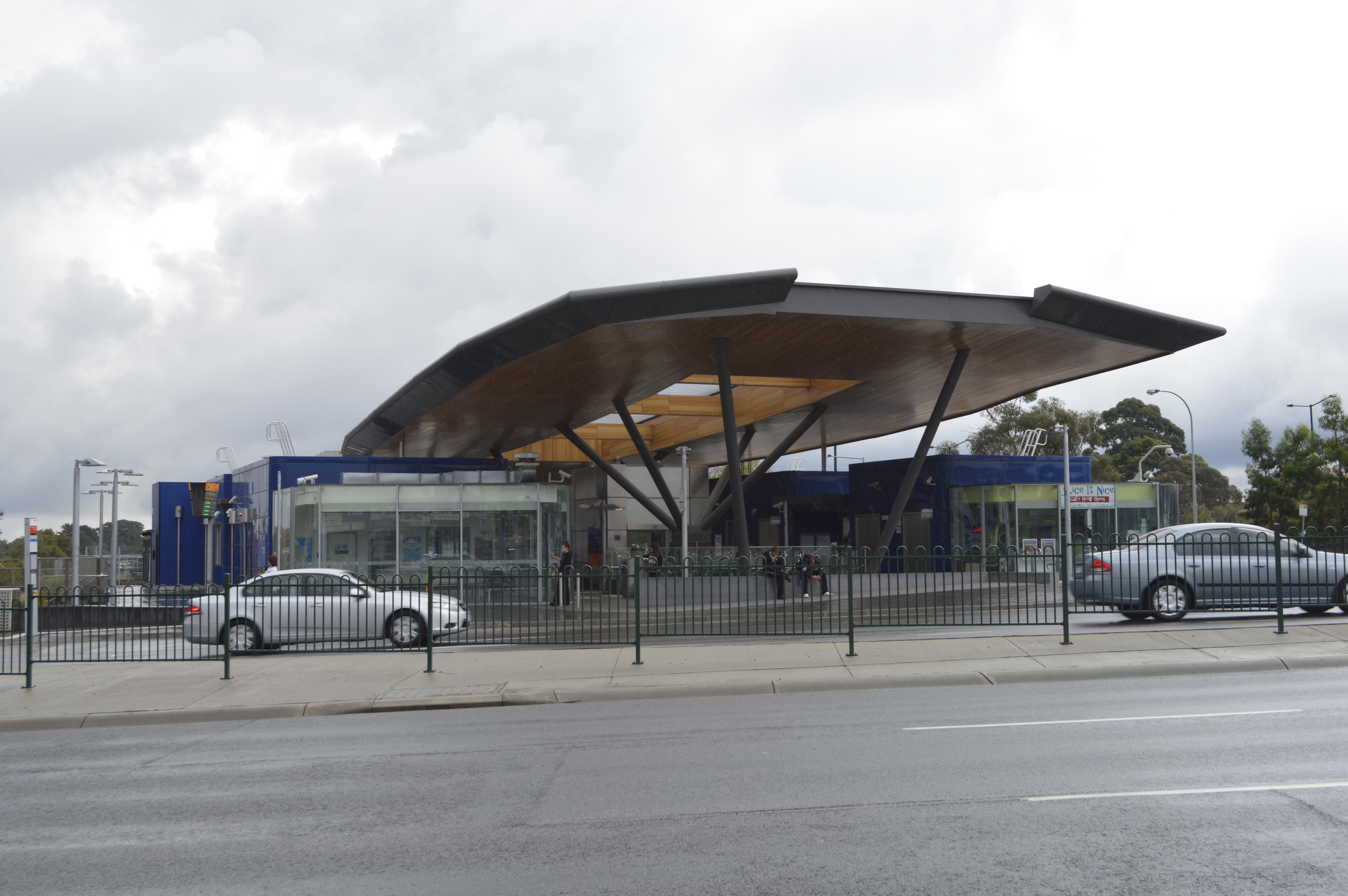
Picture of Nunawading railway station exterior, taken from across Springvale Road in May 2014.

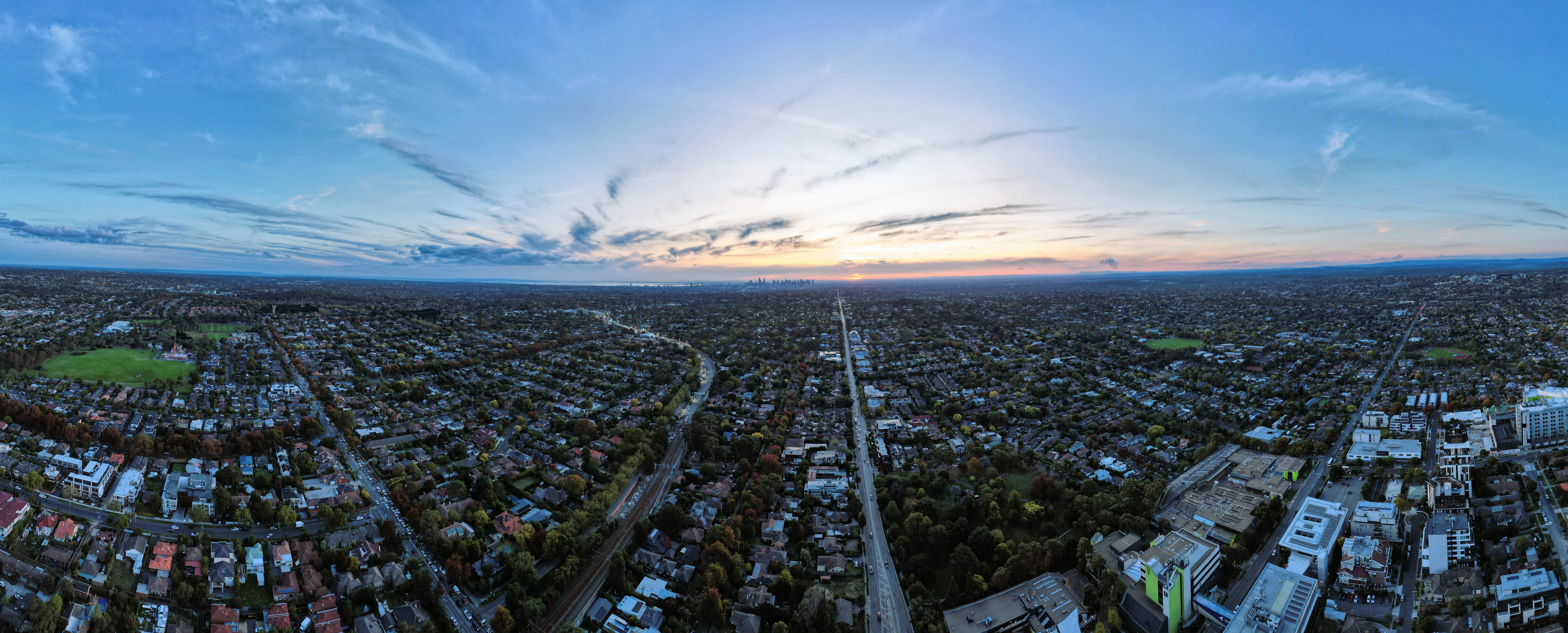
Aerial panorama of Whitehorse LGA facing west towards the Melbourne skyline. April 2023.

- Blackburn Road (State Route 13)
- Boronia Road (State Route 36)
- Burwood Highway (State Route 26)
- Canterbury Road (State Route 32)
- Elgar Road (B970)
- Eastern Freeway (M3)
- Highbury Road
- Maroondah Highway (Whitehorse Road) (State Route 34)
- Middleborough Road (State Route 23)
- Mitcham Road (State Route 36)
- Riversdale Road (State Route 20)
- Springvale Road (State Route 40)
- Station Street (State Route 47)
- Surrey Road (State Route 13)
- Warrigal Road (State Route 15)

== Culture ==
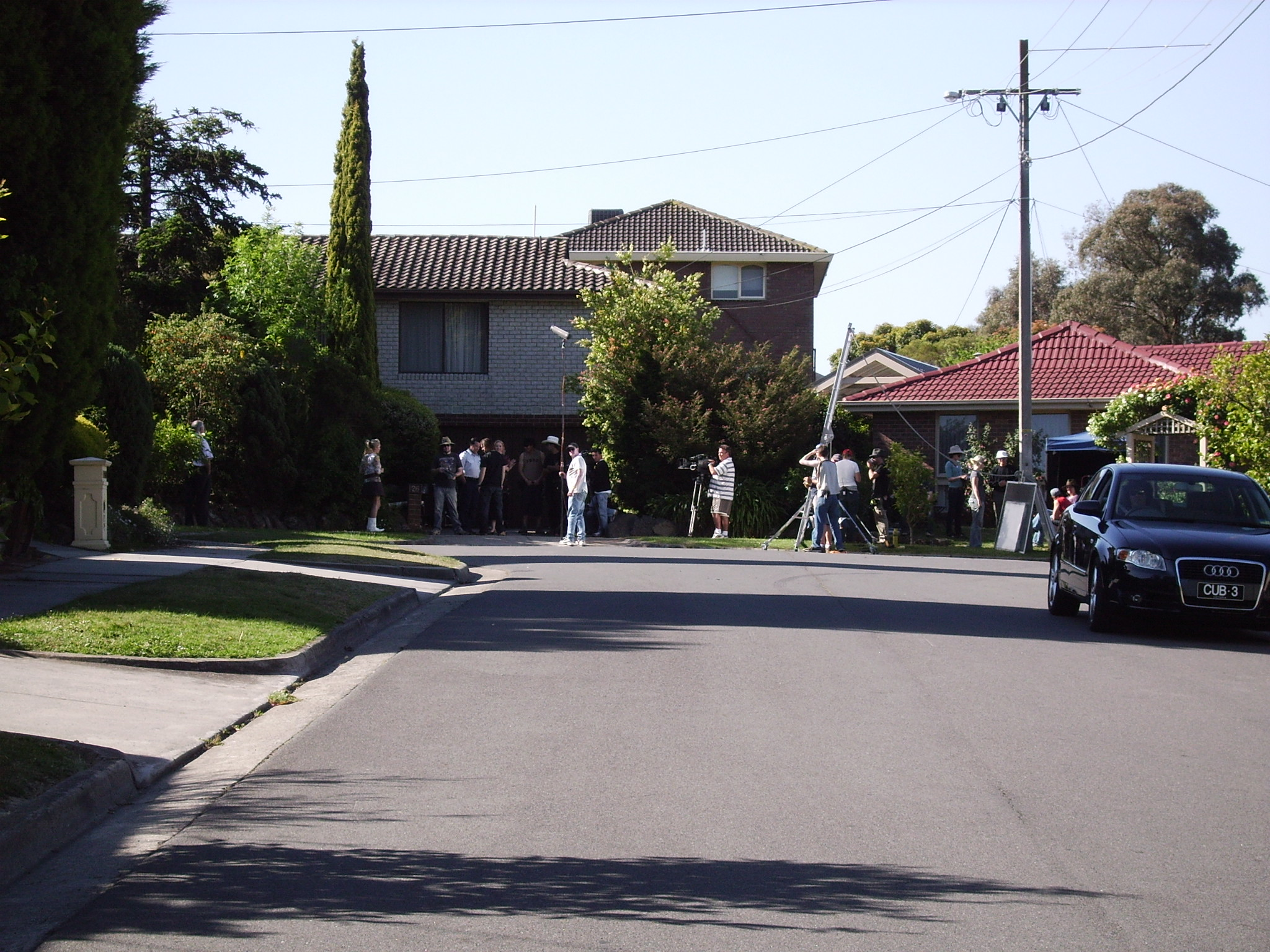
An episode of Neighbours being filmed at Pin Oak Court

Neighbours is filmed in Vermont South; Pin Oak Court is the real cul-de-sac that has doubled for Ramsay Street since 1985. All of the houses featured in the show are real and the residents allow Neighbours to shoot external scenes in their front and back yards and on occasions, in their garages. Owing to its association with the show, Pin Oak Court is popular with tourists. Interior scenes were filmed at Global Television studios in the adjacent suburb of Forest Hill.

Box Hill has variously supported an eponymous brass band since 1889.

== Sister city relations ==
On 12 May 1971, the City of Box Hill established a sister city relationship with Matsudo, in Chiba, Japan. In December 1994, when Box Hill amalgamated with Nunawading, the City of Whitehorse re-affirmed its relationship with Matsudo.

In April 2005, the City of Whitehorse signed a Memorandum of Friendship and Understanding with Shaoxing, in Zhejiang, China. The Memorandum of Friendship and Understanding aims to foster international liaisons and links and facilitate the exchange of information and personal visits, as well as to strengthen economic, tourism and educational connections between the two cities through sharing knowledge and cultural understanding.

== Libraries ==
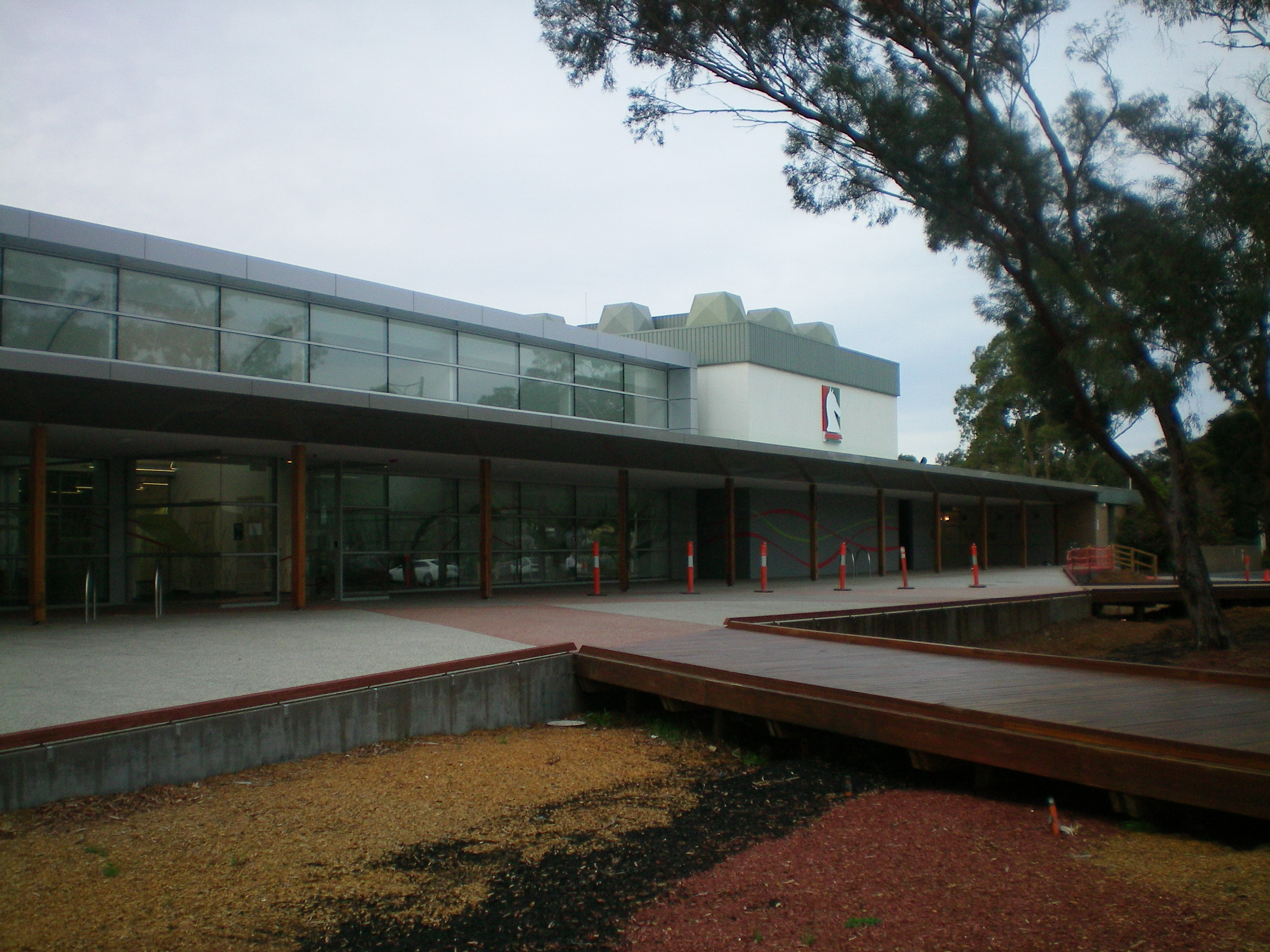
Nunawading Library

Libraries in the City of Whitehorse are operated by Whitehorse Manningham Libraries, which also has branches in the City of Manningham.

The branches in Whitehorse include:

- Blackburn Library – Located at Cnr Blackburn and Central Roads, Blackburn.
- Box Hill Library – Located at 1040 Maroondah Highway, Box Hill.
- Nunawading Library – Located at 379 Maroondah Highway, Nunawading.
- Vermont South Library – Located at Pavey Place, Vermont South.

== See also ==
- List of places on the Victorian Heritage Register in the City of Whitehorse
