= Berengarra School =

Coordinates: 37°48′14″S 145°7′55″E

- Box Hill North, Melbourne, Victoria, Australia

Information
- Opened: 7 January 1977
- Gender: Co-educational
- Website: www.berengarra.vic.edu.au

Berengarra School is a school in the suburb of Box Hill North, Melbourne, Victoria, Australia. Berengarra School is a specialist independent secondary school for students in Years 7–12. The school is non-denominational and co-educational for students with social and emotional complexity.

The Chadstone Campus caters to senior secondary students in Years 11–12, offering the Victorian Pathways Certificate (VPC) and the VCE Vocational Major (VM). These programs support students preparing for apprenticeships, further education, or employment.

In 2004, Berengarra Secondary School was one of the schools linked to the launch of itsallright.org, a youth mental health website developed by SANE Australia to support young people with a parent or friend affected by mental illness.

Berengarra School has been recognised as a key provider of alternative education pathways in Melbourne's eastern suburbs. A 2010 report commissioned by the Gateway Local Learning and Employment Network (LLEN) identified the school as a critical support for students who are disengaged from mainstream education. The report describes Berengarra as an independent, non-profit secondary school established in 1976, which offers small class sizes and tailored learning environments for young people with social and emotional complexities. Its programs are designed to build resilience, self-understanding, and foundational learning skills in students who have experienced barriers to success in conventional schooling.

In 2013, the school introduced a later start time, which then-principal Mark Heuston claimed led to a 70 percent drop in behavioural time-outs issued to students.
