= Michael George (footballer) =

Australian rules footballer

Personal information
- Full name: Michael Peter George
- Born: 18 December 1888; Nunawading, Victoria
- Died: 10 June 1957 (aged 68); Mitcham, Victoria
- Original teams: Mitcham, Tunstall
- Height: 179 cm (5 ft 10 in)

Playing career^{1}
Years	Club	Games (Goals)
1910	Melbourne	3 (0)
- ^{1} Playing statistics correct to the end of 1910.

Michael Peter George (18 December 1888 – 10 June 1957) was an Australian rules footballer who played with Melbourne in the Victorian Football League (VFL). He was cleared to Victorian Football Association side Prahran in 1919.
