= Balwyn =

- Suburb
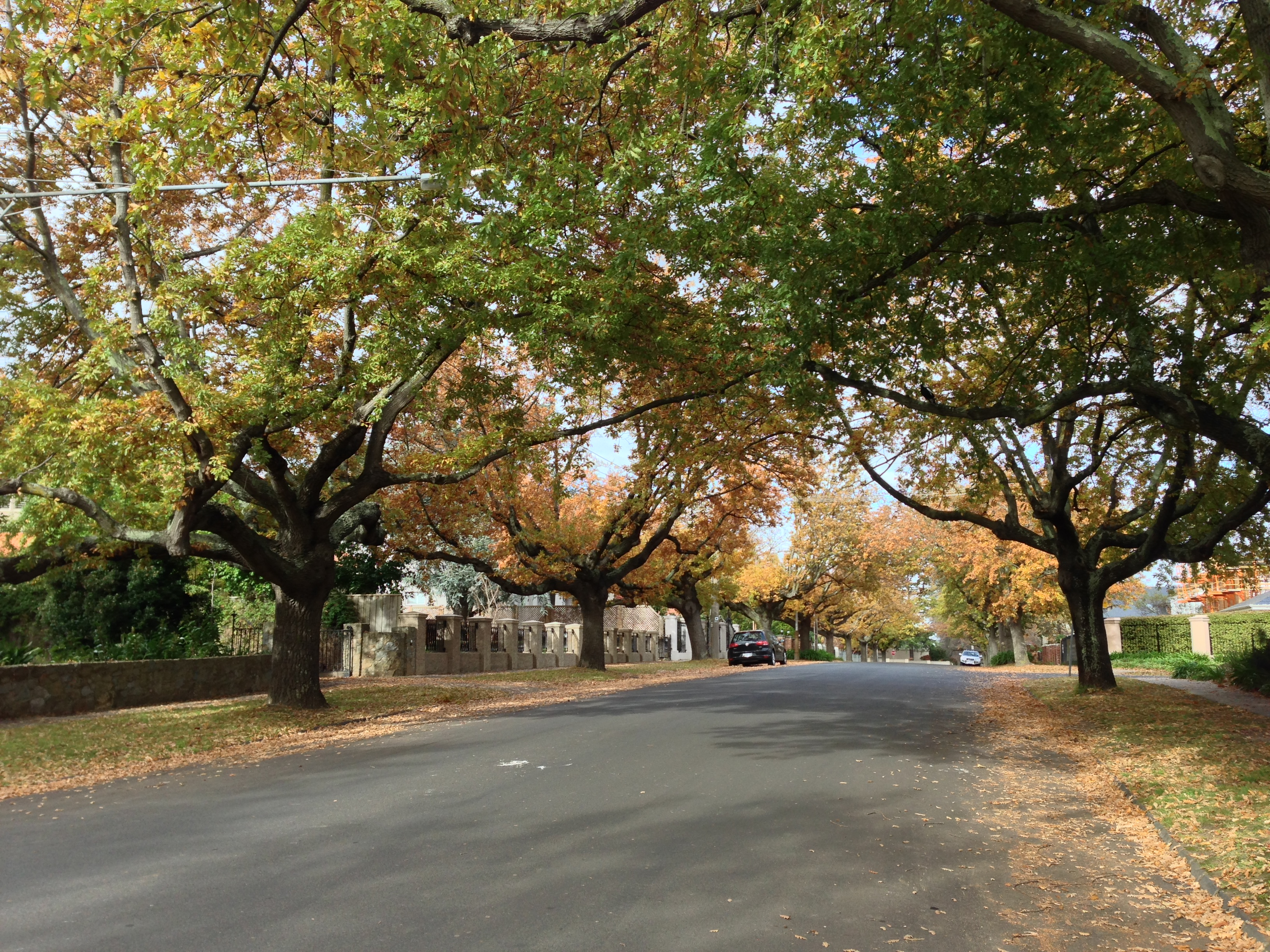
- Knutsford Street, Balwyn

- Interactive map of Balwyn
- Coordinates: 37°48′32″S 145°4′44″E
- Country: Australia
- State: Victoria
- City: Melbourne
- LGA: City of Boroondara
- Location: 10 km (6.2 mi) from Melbourne

Government
  - State electorate: Kew
  - Federal divisions: Kooyong; Menzies

Area
  - Total: 5.6 km^{2} (2.2 sq mi)
- Elevation: 84 m (276 ft)

Population
  - Total: 13,495 (SAL 2021)
- Postcode: 3103
Suburbs around Balwyn
Kew East	Balwyn North	Mont Albert North
Kew	Balwyn	Mont Albert North
Deepdene	Canterbury	Mont Albert

Balwyn (/ˈbɔːlwən/) is a suburb of Melbourne, Victoria, Australia, 10 km (6.2 mi) east of Melbourne's Central Business District, located within the City of Boroondara local government area. Balwyn recorded a population of 13,495 at the 2021 census.

The suburb's post-European settlement character was initially agricultural with several large estates built around a small village centre. Since the early 20th century, farms and mansions gave way to suburban development as the population of Melbourne rapidly grew. Today Balwyn is almost entirely residential and one of Victoria's most affluent suburbs, regularly ranking in the state's top 10 most expensive suburbs.

== Etymology ==
In the late 1850s Andrew Murray, commercial editor and political writer for The Argus newspaper, bought land on the hill overlooking Canterbury Gardens. He named his house Balwyn from the Gaelic bal and the Saxon wyn, meaning 'the home of the vine'. Balwyn Road and the district were named after it. The house was located on the site that is now part of Fintona Girls' School.

== History ==
=== Pre-European settlement ===
The formally recognised traditional owners for the area in which Balwyn is located are the Wurundjeri people, who lived on the land for at least 14,000 years. The Wurundjeri People are represented by the Wurundjeri Woi Wurrung Cultural Heritage Aboriginal Corporation.

=== 19th century ===
Following the Foundation of Melbourne, Balwyn was part of Henry Elgar's Special Survey of 8 square miles (21 km^{2}) in 1841, which was subdivided into small farms and grazing runs.

In 1868 Balwyn Primary School was opened in Balwyn Road about 100 metres north of Whitehorse Road. It was moved to its present site, south of Whitehorse Road, in 1880, opposite Murray's property. Balwyn's first town centre was near the intersection of Balwyn and Whitehorse Roads, containing a few shops, a blacksmith and the athenaeum or mechanics' institute. Anglican services began in 1868 and the St. Barnabas church, Balwyn Road, was opened in 1872.

Balwyn Post Office first opened on 26 August 1874, in a rural area, closed in 1894, then reopened in 1920. It faced a second closure on 11 February 2011 but due to a campaign by local residents and the intervention of the Federal Member, Josh Frydenberg, the service was reopened.

The Outer Circle railway line, with a station at Deepdene, opened in 1891, was closed in 1893, re-opened in 1900 then finally closed to passenger traffic in 1927.

=== 20th century ===
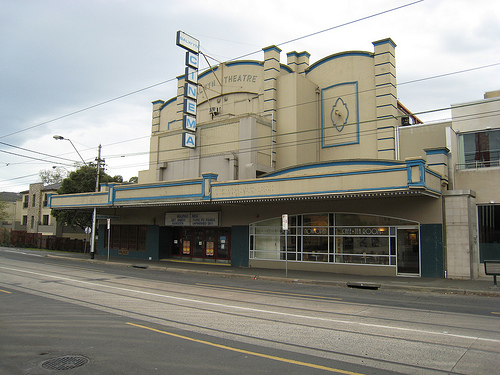
Balwyn Cinema on Whitehorse Road

The electric tram system was extended along Cotham Road to terminate at Burke Road, Deepdene, on 30 May 1913. The line was extended along Whitehorse Road, through Balwyn to terminate at Union Road, Mont Albert, on 30 September 1916.

The Balwyn Cinema opened as a single screen theatre in 1930. It was converted into a three-screen cinema in February 1994, after it was acquired by Palace Cinemas.

A considerable number of local churches, such as the Deepdene Methodist Church, were constructed during the post-World War II boom of suburban development in the area.

Balwyn's status as an affluent suburb has seen middle to upper-middle-class families from suburbs such as Kew and Brighton move to the area for the suburb's relatively large block sizes and proximity to some of Victoria's best private schools, including those in the neighbouring suburbs of Canterbury and Kew. Some of the initial development of the suburb occurred along the Whitehorse Road tramline, along which the Wade handbag and the Jarvis Walker fishing rod factories were once located.

=== 21st century ===
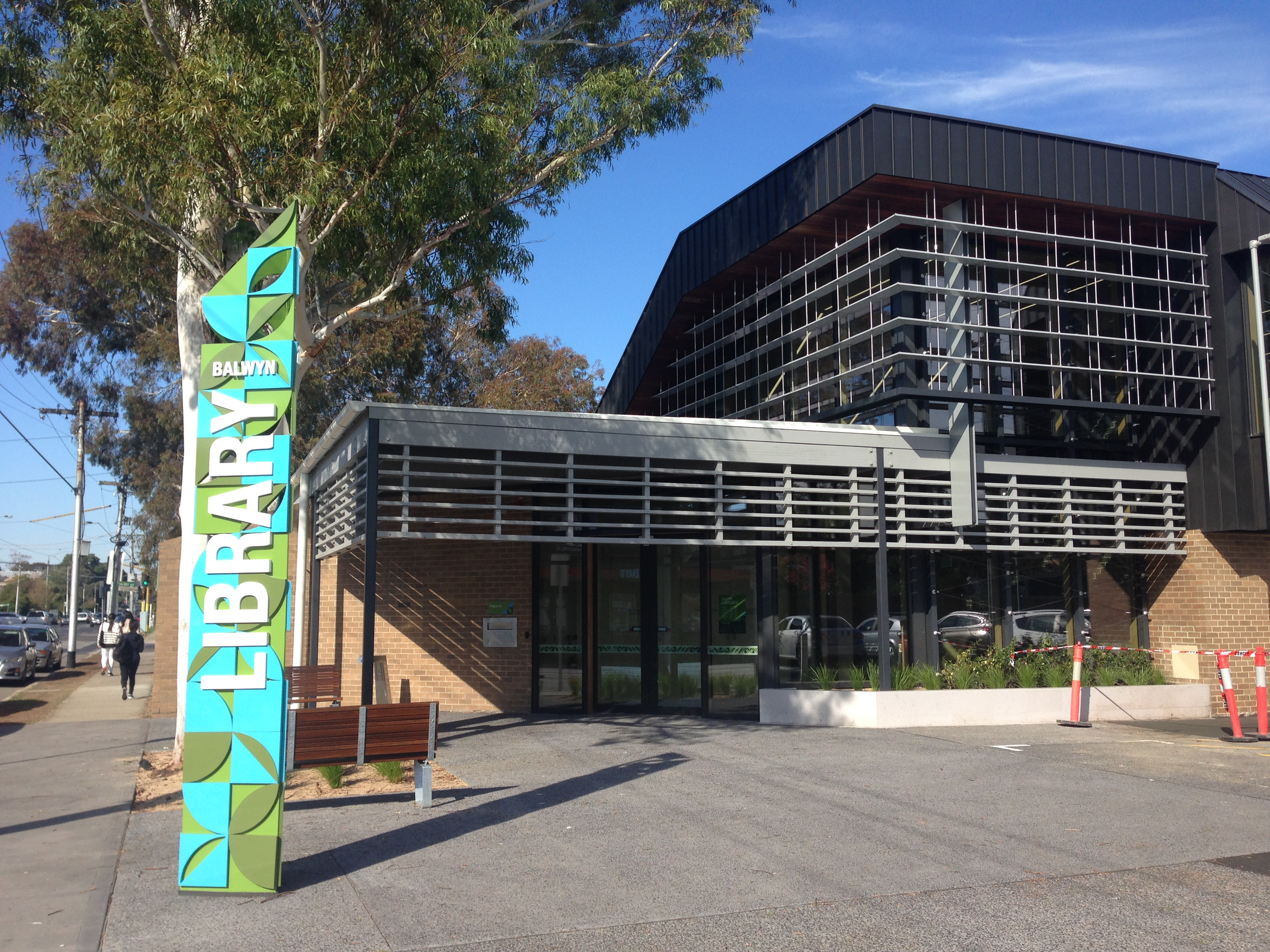
The refurbished Balwyn Library in 2018. Balwyn is the most popular public library in the state behind the State Library of Victoria.

The south western part of Balwyn was excised as the suburb of Deepdene in 2010.

In 2005, Balwyn Cinema was converted into a five-screen cinema, and had its foyer restored after a major flood, uncovering the original 1930s tiled floor. It also served as the head office of Palace Cinemas until 2016, when the head office was moved to South Yarra. In December 2016, four more screens were added. In March 2017, another two screens were added, which makes 11 screens in total.

Balwyn is consistently ranked as one of Melbourne's five most exclusive suburbs. The heritage-protected Reid Estate, between Mont Albert and Whitehorse Roads, contains many architecturally significant Interwar houses.

The suburb was lampooned by the Skyhooks in their single, Balwyn Calling, and was once described as "arguably Melbourne's most maligned".

== Geography ==
=== Localities ===
==== Balwyn East ====
A small area adjacent to Mont Albert North is sometimes known as Balwyn East. This name is generally used to refer to parts around the East Balwyn Shopping Centre at the intersection of Union Road and Belmore Road.

=== Landmarks ===
Balwyn is home to the Maranoa Botanic Gardens, Australia's first botanical garden dedicated to indigenous flora.

== Economy ==
The main shopping area is located around the intersection of Whitehorse Road and Balwyn Road.

== Transport ==
=== Road ===
Whitehorse Road runs east–west along the ridgeline through the centre of Balwyn. Balwyn Road runs north–south from Koonung Creek Reserve (adjacent to the Eastern Freeway) to Canterbury Road.

=== Public transport ===
==== Tram ====
The 109 tram line runs from Port Melbourne to Box Hill via Whitehorse Road.

==== Bus ====
The following bus routes go to or pass through Balwyn:

- 284 – Doncaster Park & Ride – Box Hill Station via Union Road
- 285 – Doncaster Park & Ride – Camberwell via North Balwyn
- 302 – City – Box Hill Station via Belmore Road and Eastern Freeway
- 304 – City – Doncaster SC via Belmore Road and Eastern Freeway
- 302-304 – Combined City – Box Hill – Doncaster SC
- 548 – Kew (Cotham Road) – La Trobe University Bundoora
- 612 - Box Hill Station - Chadstone Shopping Centre via Camberwell Shopping Centre and Glen Iris

=== Active transport ===
The two main designated north-south cycling routes are along Balwyn Road and the Anniversary Trail. Mont Albert Road is similarly classified as the main east-west route.

Almost all roads and streets in Balwyn have sealed footpaths and several parks provide connections between neighbourhoods. Some older parts of Balwyn have service lanes to the rear of properties, an uncommon feature for a suburb outside of the inner city of Melbourne.

== Education ==
=== Preschool ===
- Balwyn East Kindergarten
- Yongala Preschool

=== Primary ===
- Balwyn Primary School

=== Secondary ===
- Fintona Girls' School

== Sport ==
The suburb has an Australian Rules football team, the Balwyn Tigers. Their home ground is Balwyn Park. There are several junior teams including the Balwyn and Greythorn Jets, competing in the Eastern Football League.

It also has the Balwyn Cricket Club.

== Notable people ==
- Warwick Capper – former Australian Rules footballer, singer, actor and media personality, resident of Balwyn
- Olivia Deeble – Home And Away actress
- Steve Hooker – former pole vaulter and olympic gold medallist, grew up in Balwyn
- Kathy Jackson – former national secretary of the Health Services Union
- Jane Kennedy – semi-regular panellist on television chat show The Circle, grew up in Balwyn
- Belle Bruce Reid – Australia's first female veterinarian, established the Balwyn Veterinary Surgery

== See also ==
- City of Camberwell – Balwyn was previously within this former local government area.
- Bonjour Balwyn – A 1971 Australian independent film.
- Electoral district of Balwyn – An electoral district of the Victorian Legislative Assembly (1955–1992).
