= Koonung Secondary College =

Location
- 68 Box Hill Crescent, Mont Albert North; Melbourne, Victoria, 3129; Australia; 37.8021°S 145.1169°E

Information
- Former name: Koonung High School (until the early 1990s)
- Type: State school
- Motto: Excellence Through Endeavor
- Established: 1964
- Principal: Andrew McNeil
- Grades: 7 to 12
- Gender: Coeducational
- Enrolment: Approx. 1,000
- Colours: blue / navy blue, yellow (plus maroon for senior school)
- Publication: Weekly newsletter, semesterly Koonung Chronicle magazine
- Yearbook: School Fossicker magazine, student-produced yearbook
- Website: www.koonung.vic.edu.au

Koonung Secondary College is a secondary state school in Mont Albert North, Victoria, in the eastern suburbs of Melbourne, Australia. The school takes its name from the nearby Koonung Creek.

Its school catchment includes the suburbs of Mont Albert, Mont Albert North, Balwyn, Balwyn North, Doncaster, Box Hill, Box Hill North, Surrey Hills and Burwood.

On 13 June 2019, it received a grant of $6.05 million to improve its facilities.

== Curriculum ==
Koonung follows the VELS (Victorian Essential Learning Standards) for the years 7–10 curriculum. A standard VCE (Victorian Certificate of Education) course is run in years 11 & 12 (year 10 students also have the option to take one or two VCE subjects), with a range of VET (Vocational educational Training) subjects also available.

== Notable former students ==
- Jo Hall, television presenter
- Daniel Pearce, AFL player
- Josh Daicos, AFL player
- Swaying Abyss, Former artist, Political leader
