= Nunawading, Victoria =

Nunawading
- Suburb
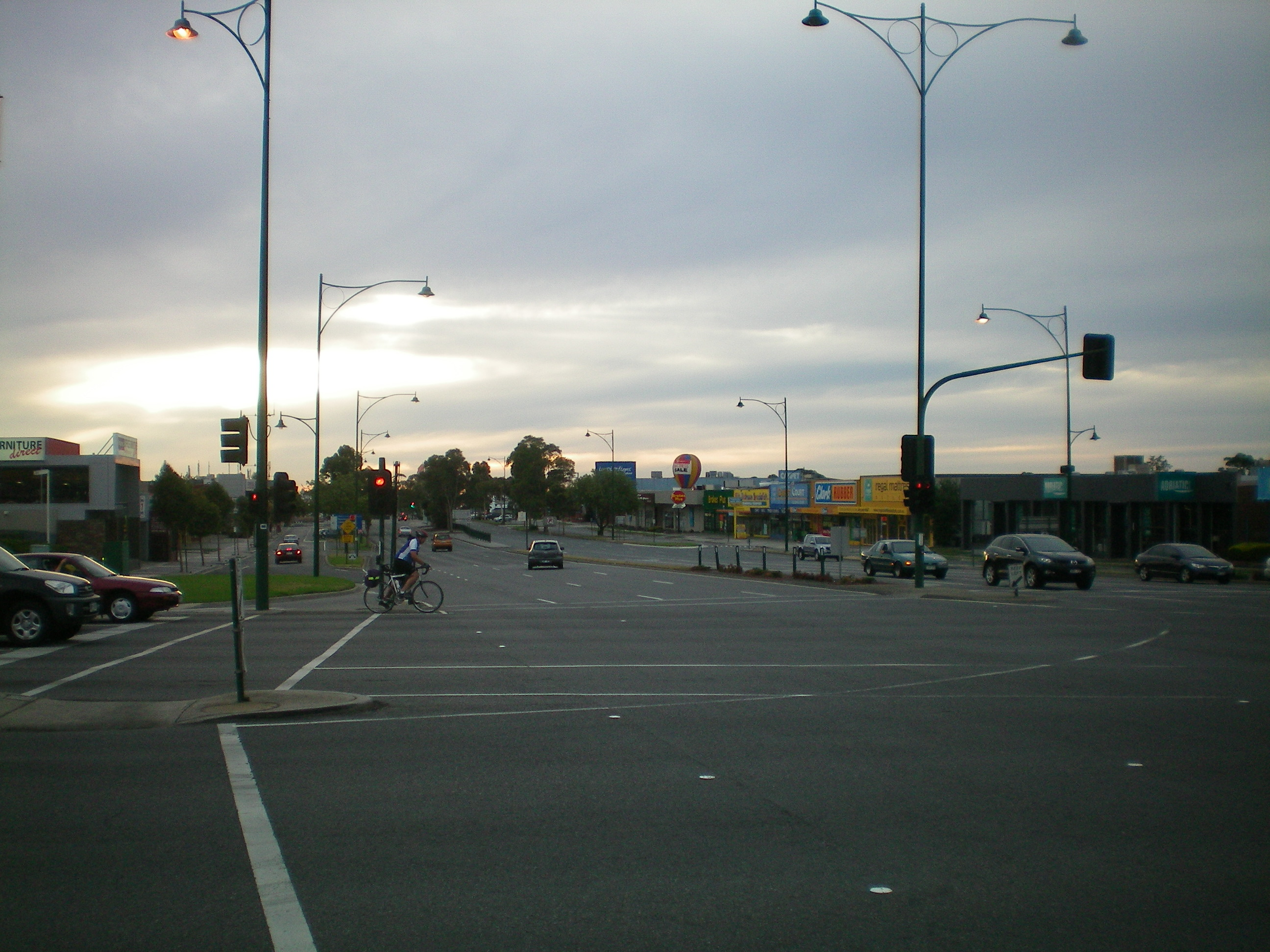

- Interactive map of Nunawading
- Coordinates: 37.817°S 145.177°E
- Country: Australia
- State: Victoria
- City: Melbourne
- LGAs: City of Manningham; City of Whitehorse
- Location: 18 km (11 mi) from Melbourne
- Established: 1870s

Government
  - State electorate: Ringwood
  - Federal division: Deakin

Area
  - Total: 5.4 km^{2} (2.1 sq mi)
- Elevation: 130 m (430 ft)

Population
  - Total: 12,413 (2021 census)
  - Density: 2,299/km^{2} (5,950/sq mi)
- Postcode: 3131
Suburbs around Nunawading
Doncaster East	Donvale	Donvale
Blackburn North	Nunawading	Mitcham
Blackburn	Forest Hill	Vermont

Nunawading (/ˌnʌnəˈwɒdɪŋ/) is an eastern suburb of Melbourne, Victoria, Australia, 18 km (11 miles) east of Melbourne's Central Business District, located within the City of Whitehorse and City of Manningham local government areas. Nunawading recorded a population of 12,413 at the 2021 census.

Most of Nunawading is located in the City of Whitehorse, although the City of Manningham governs part of it. It is centred at the intersection of Whitehorse Road and Springvale Road, in Melbourne's eastern suburbs and is the site of the main office of the City of Whitehorse, as well as large retail (e.g. furniture, auto dealerships, hardware, and electrical) and wholesale businesses, along Whitehorse Road.

== History ==
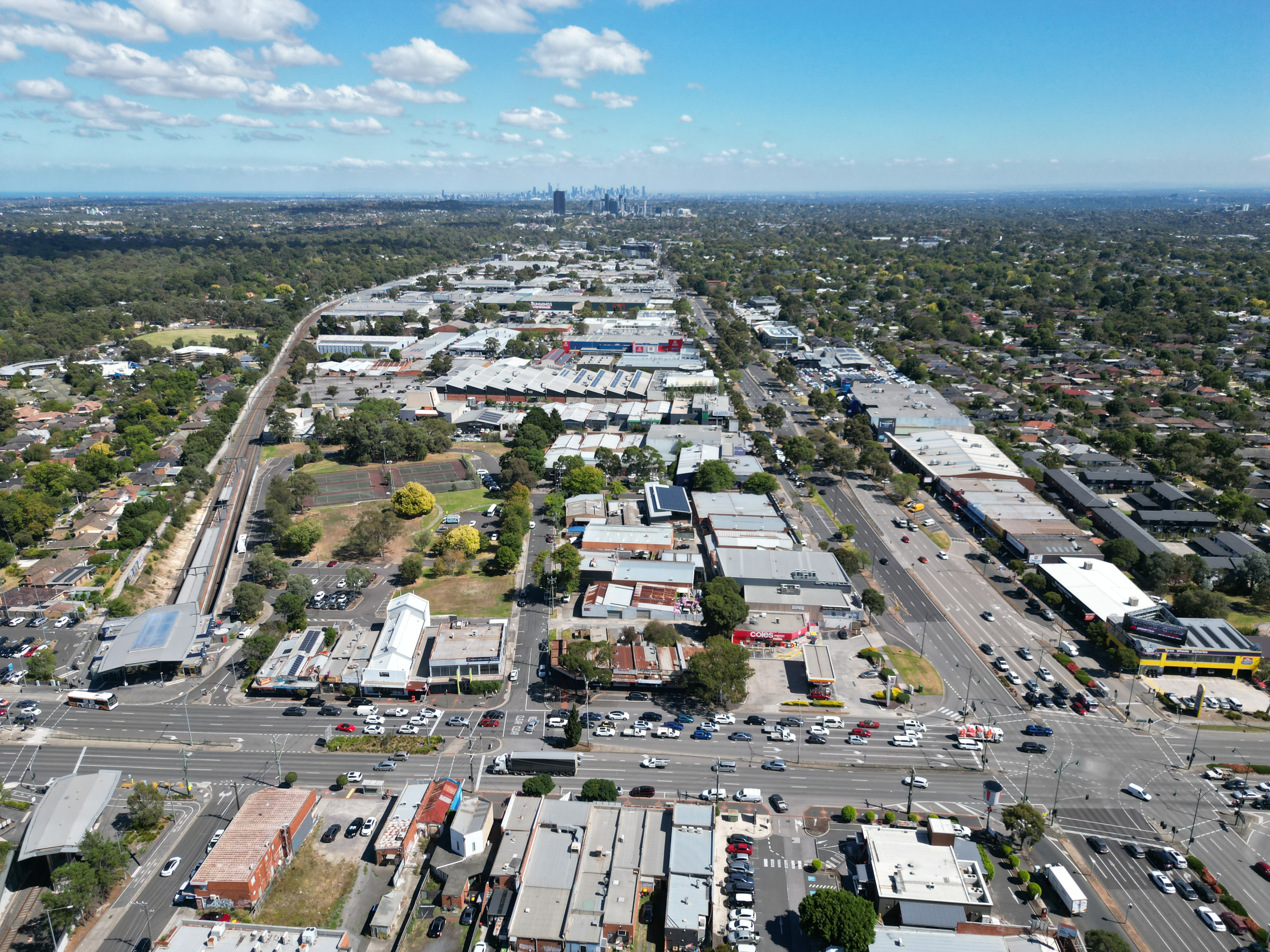
Nunawading train station from above facing the Melbourne CBD March 2024

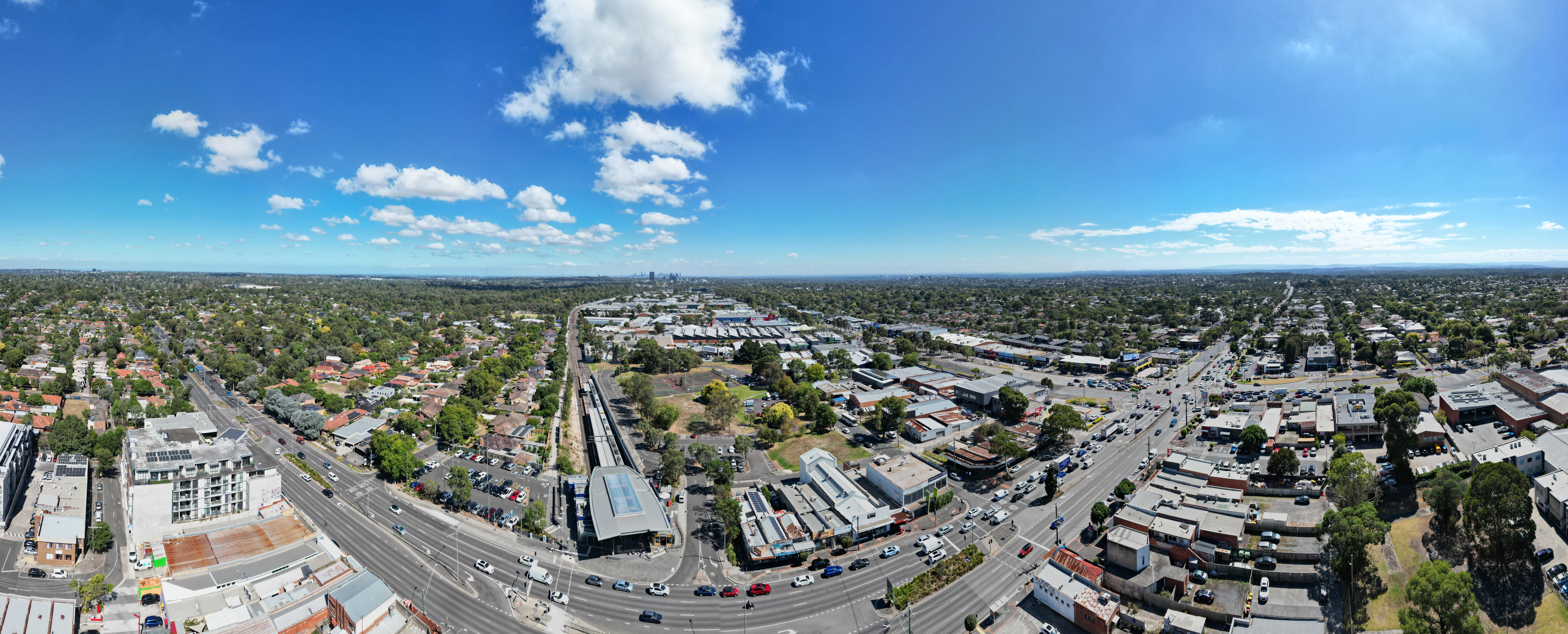
Nunawading aerial panorama facing Melbourne skyline. March 2024.

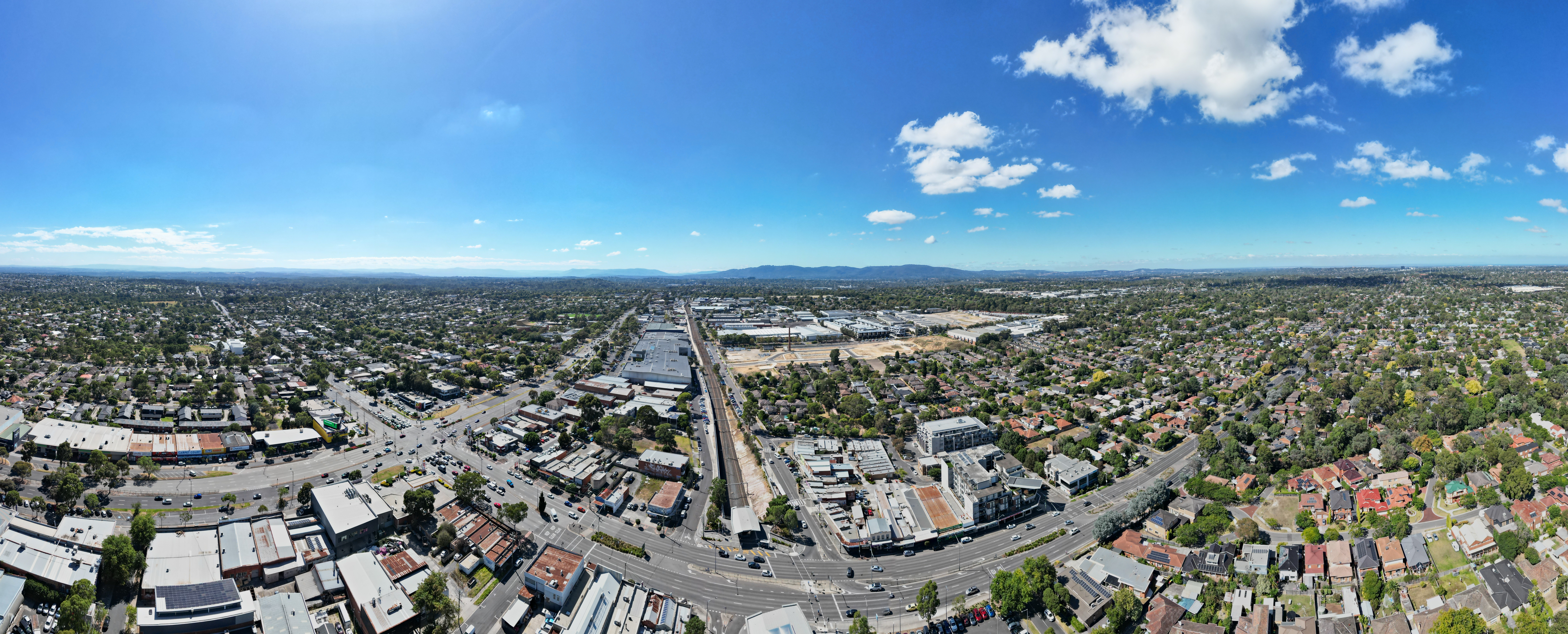
Nunawading aerial panorama facing the Dandenong Ranges. March 2024.

The name Nunawading, thought to be derived from an Aboriginal word meaning either "battlefield" or "ceremonial ground", was initially applied to a vast area which now incorporates Box Hill, Blackburn, Mitcham, Forest Hill and Vermont.

The township of Nunawading began life in the 1870s as a site of brick and clay production. The name Tunstall, derived from the famed English pottery town, was given to the area, centred at the intersection of Whitehorse Road and Springvale Road. The former name is still reflected in Tunstall Park, on Luckie Street, Tunstall Avenue, off Springvale Road, and the Tunstall Square Shopping Centre, on Tunstall Road, in nearby Donvale. The opening of the Tunstall railway station contributed to the growth of brick and clay industries, with orchards soon following. Tunstall Post Office opened on 1 February 1889 and was renamed Nunawading in 1945.

Following a series of local government subdivisions in the 1920s, the name Nunawading fell from use. The name was reinstated in 1945 when it replaced Tunstall.

The period following World War II saw a housing boom in the area, as residential blocks began to replace orchards. The civic centre was opened in 1968 and became the administrative centre for the City of Nunawading, which was incorporated into the City of Whitehorse, in 1994, along with the City of Box Hill.

Nunawading Primary School on Springvale Road closed in 2012 and the main building is now the Nunawading Community Hub, which opened in 2020.

The suburb was formerly home to the Winlaton Youth Training Centre (closed in 1993) and the Wobbies World amusement park (closed in 1999).

== Places of interest ==
Whitehorse Road is the site of the largest retail strip for bulk goods in Melbourne. The City of Whitehorse has named this strip the MegaMile, in an attempt to provide brand recognition for retailers. Nunawading is home to a large Pacific Brands clothing factory and a brick factory. The head office of Bird Observation & Conservation Australia is on Springvale Road. It is also one of the suburbs where the soap opera Neighbours is filmed.

== Education ==
- Whitehorse Primary School opened on the site of the former Springview Primary School following its merger with Nunawading Primary School in 2010.
- St Phillip's Catholic primary school, next to Whitehorse Primary School.
- Mount Pleasant Road Primary School, formerly Nunawading South Primary School, is located on the corner of Mount Pleasant Road and Eugenia Street.
- It is also the site of Nunawading Christian College.

== Transport ==
Nunawading has benefited from the new Nunawading railway station, one of the larger metropolitan stations in the eastern suburbs, and the Springvale Road grade separation, in 2010. The southern and northern areas of Nunawading are now more unified, with better access to the Eastern Freeway, which runs along the north the suburb.

== Demographics ==
In the 2021 census, the population of Nunawading was 12,413, with 51.3% being female and 48.7% male.

=== Age ===
The median/average age of the people in Nunawading is 39 years.

=== Country of birth ===
57.4% of people living in Nunawading were born in Australia. The other major countries of birth were China (8.7%), India (4.0%), Malaysia (2.4%), England (2.3%), and Vietnam (1.7%).

=== Language used at home ===
58.2% of people living in Nunawading spoke only English at home. The other languages spoken at home were Mandarin (10.9%), Cantonese (5.3%), Hindi (1.8%), Vietnamese (1.7%), and Punjabi (1.6%).

=== Religious Affiliation ===
40% said they had no religion, 15.6% identified as Catholic, 6.1% Anglican, and 5.4% identified as Buddhist.

== Religion ==
A large Seventh-day Adventist campus exists on Central Road, including a church (Nunawading Seventh-day Adventist Church), church offices, a retail book shop, Coronella Retirement Village and a coeducational Christian college.

There is also the Whitehorse Uniting Church Nunawading on Whitehorse Road.

== Sport ==
The area has an Association Football team, Nunawading City FC, that competes in NPL2 Victoria. It also has an Australian rules football team, the Nunawading Lions, competing in the Eastern Football League. However, their home ground is in the suburb of Blackburn North.

The Nunawading Cricket Club is based at Mahoneys Reserve, in Forest Hill. Competing in the Box Hill Reporter District Cricket Association, the club holds the record number of premierships in the competition and has been the breeding ground of many prominent Australian cricketers, including the Victorian and Tasmanian seam bowler David Saker, after whose ancestors the club's main ground is named.

Nunawading is home to the Nunawading Swimming Club, which is the largest swimming club in the Southern Hemisphere.

Nunawading is also home to the Beavers Basketball Team and Nunawading Netball Team. The Beavers currently play section 9 on Sundays and are aiming to win the championship this season under the guidance of ex-Warrior Nick Papaziakas.

Although their home ground, Nunawading Stadium, is in Burwood East, the Nunawading Spectres represent Nunawading in the Melbourne East Basketball Association (MEBA).

== Notable people ==
- Michael George - VFL footballer
- Mark Jackson - VFL footballer
- Cecilia McIntosh - athlete and AFL footballer
- Ian Stacker - basketball player and coach

== See also ==
- City of Nunawading – Nunawading was previously within this former local government area.
