= Koonung Creek Reserve =

Park in Victoria, Australia

- Grassed informal open space in the reserve looking west, prior to North East Link construction.
- Interactive map of Koonung Creek Reserve
- Location: Melbourne
- Coordinates: 37.780891°S 145.095517°E
- Area: 313,352sqm
- Operator: City of Boroondara
- Paths: Mix of formal and informal pathways
- Terrain: Linear park
- Water: Wetlands
- Vegetation: Australian Native
- Public transit: Bus routes 207, 284, 285, 309, 907, 908
- Facilities: Playground, barbeques, toilets, Dog off-lead

Koonung Creek Reserve is a linear park in the suburb of Balwyn North, Melbourne, Australia. It follows the path of the Eastern Freeway from Bulleen Road in the west to Doncaster Road to the east.

== History ==
The area has been green open space since before European settlement, being situated in a valley near the Yarra River. It was not formally declared as parkland as late as 1966, and its exact date of proclamation is unknown.

It remained relatively unaffected by suburban development in its immediate vicinity until the construction of the second stage of the Eastern Freeway in 1982. To provide some compensation for the significant loss of green space by the construction of the freeway, the Country Roads Board and the affected municipalities of Camberwell and Doncaster & Templestowe planted over 12,000 trees, primarily on the North Balwyn side of the freeway. The works also included undergrounding Koonung Creek for 2.4 km to allow for construction of the freeway. These works formed the basis for the use of the area as parkland.

The construction of the freeway through the area also sparked the commencement of a long-standing issue between local residents and the state government on traffic noise. Residents and the local council have lobbied the state government for many years to improve noise attenuation measures, particularly on the stretch of the road in Koonung Creek Reserve. The lack of any artificial noise barriers, relying instead on small dirt mounds and vegetation, has resulted in noise levels well above the 63 decibel limit for new freeways.

More recently, the reserve and surrounding parklands were involved in the East West Link project. Proposed works for the project included widening the Eastern Freeway by one lane in each direction up to Tram Road. The City of Boroondara strongly objected to any potential for parkland to be used in the widening of the road reserve in numerous submissions in 2013 and 2014.

The North East Link has had a significant impact on the Reserve. Despite opposition from local residents and local Council, 65% of the land is now used for construction and storage of materials, scheduled to continue until the planned completion date of 2028. Once built approximately 25% of the parkland will be replaced by the widened Eastern Freeway.

== Facilities ==
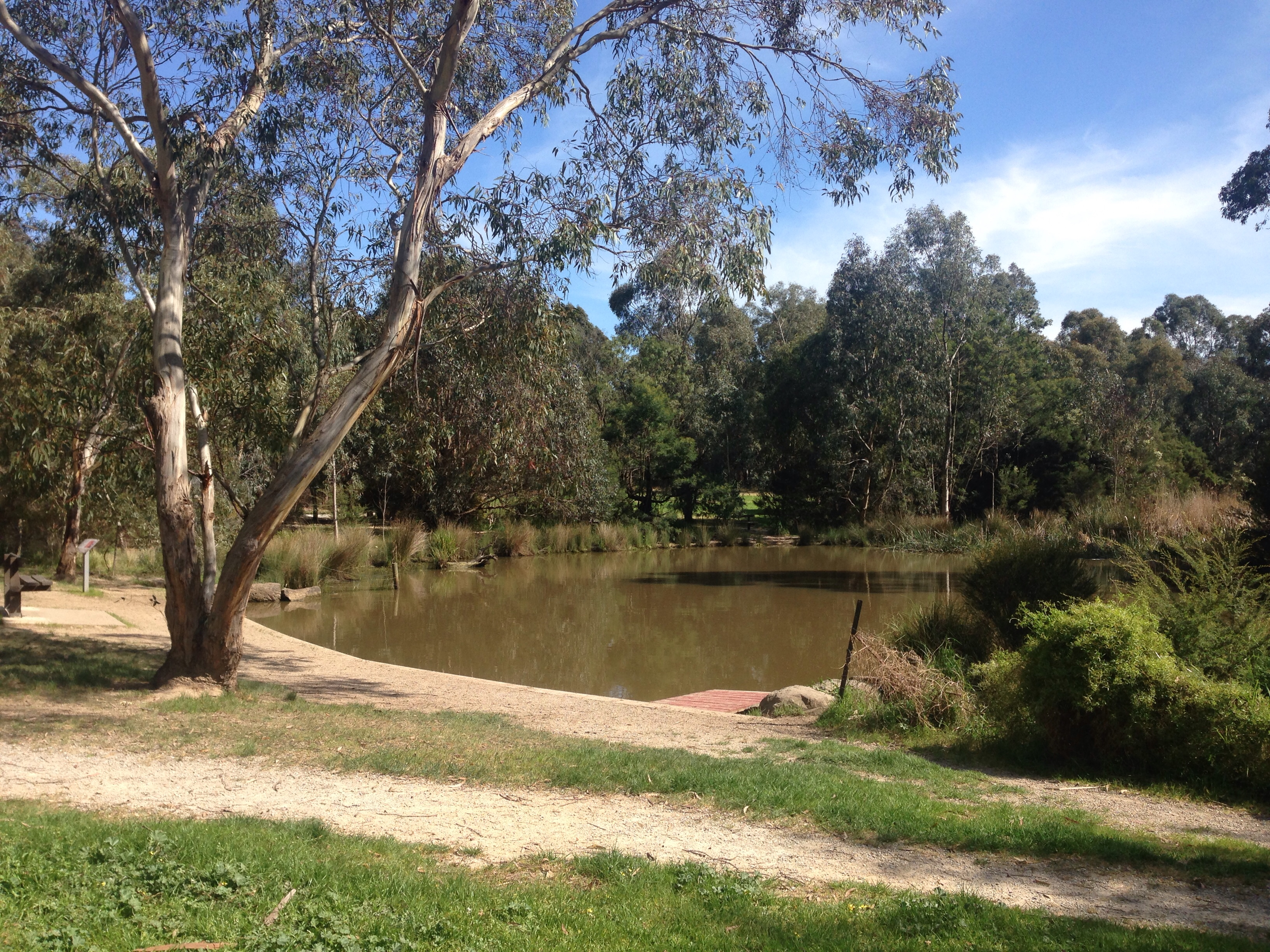
Wetlands formerly located in Koonung Creek Reserve prior to North East Link works.

The Koonung Creek Trail runs through the park from east to west along a fully paved 3m wide path. Separate gravel paths have been provided for pedestrians along certain stretches. A playground and public toilet is located near the corner of Wilburton Parade and Arama Street.

Large open sections of the park are dog off-lead areas, while council local laws and a fence prohibit dogs close to the playground. A number of informal ovals are also located throughout the park.

== Access ==
The main sealed pathway runs through the reserve from west to east as part of the Koonung Creek Trail and provides easy pedestrian and bicycle access to the entire park. Many frequent freeway bus services stop on the Eastern Freeway on ramp on the eastern end of the reserve. A small carpark is also accessible off Doncaster Road near the bus stop. The 285 bus provides the only direct access by public transport to the centre of the park. Unrestricted street parking is available along the entire length of the park adjacent to residential areas.

== See also ==
- Eastern Freeway
- Balwyn North
