= Mont Albert, Victoria =

Mont Albert Melbourne, Victoria
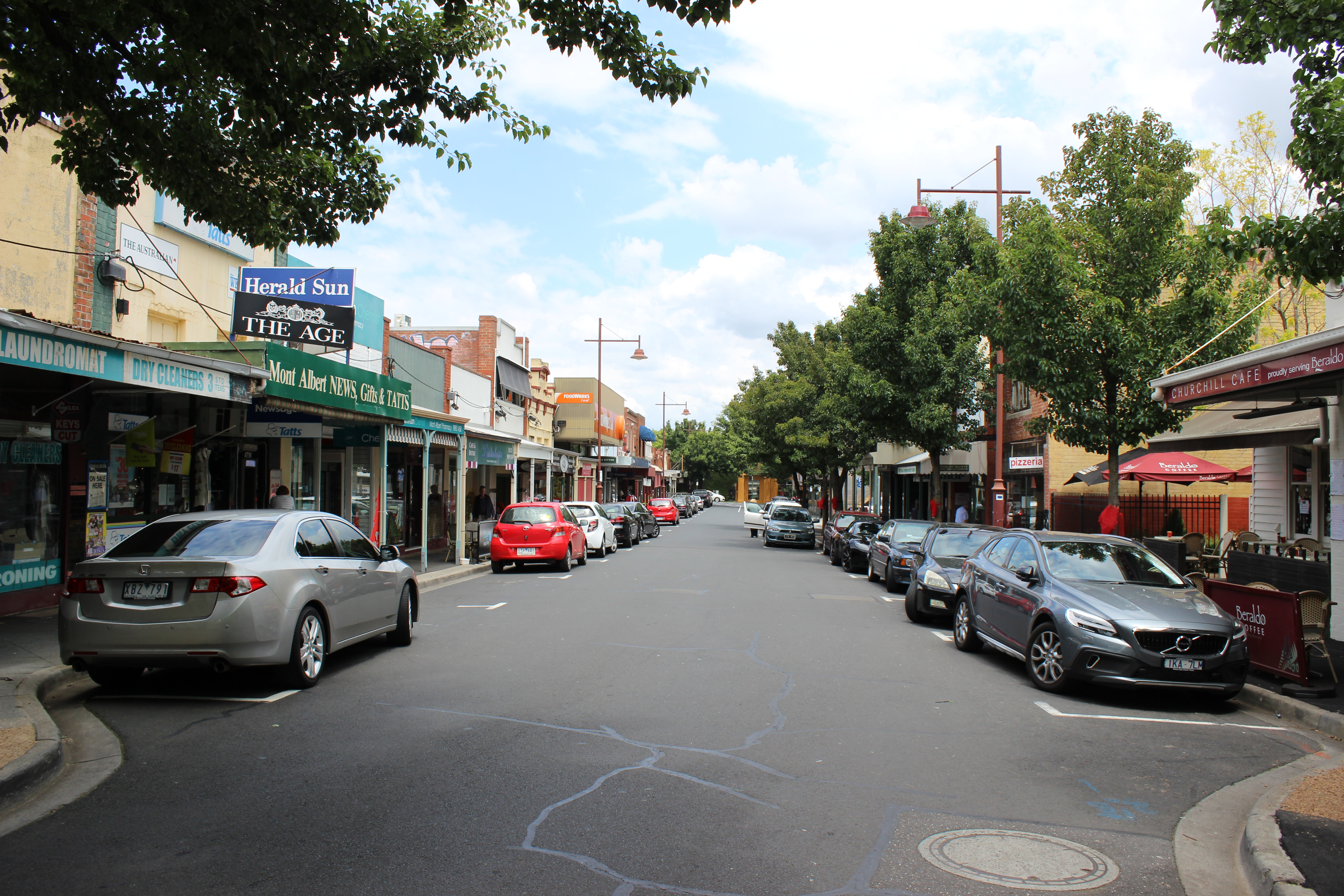
- Hamilton Street

- Coordinates: 37°48′58″S 145°6′36″E
- Population: 4,948 (SAL 2021)
- Postcode(s): 3127
- Area: 1.6 km^{2} (0.6 sq mi)
- Location: 12 km (7 mi) from Melbourne
- LGA(s): City of Boroondara; City of Whitehorse
- State electorate(s): Box Hill; Kew
- Federal division(s): Menzies
Suburbs around Mont Albert:
Balwyn	Mont Albert North	Box Hill North
Surrey Hills	Mont Albert	Box Hill
	Surrey Hills	Box Hill South

Mont Albert is an inner eastern suburb of Melbourne, Victoria, Australia, 12 kilometres east of Melbourne's Central Business District, located within the Cities of Boroondara and Whitehorse local government areas. Mont Albert recorded a population of 4,948 at the 2021 census.

The main shopping centre of Mont Albert is Hamilton Street, a small street lined with shops. The suburb had its own railway station before being demolished as part of the Level Crossing Removal Project.

== History ==
A residential subdivision south of the railway line, containing the current shopping centre, was put up for sale in 1887. The subdivision was planned in expectation of further land investment, which was delayed by the 1890s slump. Despite this, a local advancement association obtained the establishment of a railway station in 1891. The Surrey Hills golf club (1892-1907) utilized the ground on the north side of the railway line until residences appeared in any number.

The local shopping centre, located just south of the railway station, began construction in 1913. In 1915, a tram service along Whitehorse Road to the suburb's north-western corner was established. Houses between tram and railway lines are distinguished by Edwardian, English Domestic Revival, and Arts and Crafts styles.

Mont Albert was an upper middle-class neighbourhood, and its strong brick three-story elementary school (1917) boasts many outstanding students, including MPs, scholars, and a university vice-chancellor. Houses are generously proportioned and sit on large lots. In 2014, Mont Albert Primary School had 691 students.

The Mont Albert businesses have kept a wider variety of retail establishments than is typical for a small town, however several were lost when the Salvation Army's southern headquarters were established there. The eastern edge of Mont Albert is Elgar Road, which has been home to a gas factory, a technical college, and the Elgar campus of Box Hill TAFE. The Kingsley Gardens public reserve is right next door.

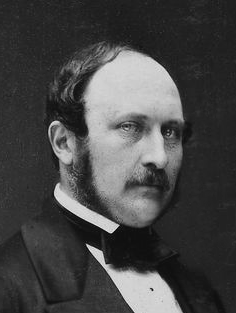
Albert, Prince Consort – The likely namesake of Mont Albert. Photograph by J. J. E. Mayall, 1860

=== Historical population ===
Mont Albert's census populations have been:
CENSUS DATE	POPULATION
2001	4143
2006	4419
2011	4954

== Demographics ==
At the 2016 Australian Census, there were 4,840 people living in Mont Albert as their hometown.

- 47.6% of the population were male and 52.4% were female.
- The median age of a resident in Mont Albert was 40 years old.
- There were 1,286 families residing in Mont Albert.
- There were 2,018 private dwellings in Mont Albert, with 1.7 motor vehicles being owned as a median.
- 52.9% of the population were married and 32.5% were never married.
- 23.5% of the registered citizens were of English ancestry, 21.4% of Australian ancestry, 13.3% of Chinese ancestry, 9.0% of Irish ancestry and 7.8% of Scottish ancestry.
- 66.6% of Citizens were born in Australia.
- 39.8% of the population in Mont Albert are irreligious, 19.3% Catholic, 11.0% Anglican, 7.2% not stated and 3.9% Uniting Church.

Largest Groups of Foreign Residents
Nationality	Population (2016 Census)
China (Excluding SARs and Taiwan)	452
England	152
Malaysia	111
India	93
New Zealand	91

== Education ==
- Mont Albert Primary School, opened in 1917
- Box Hill Institute (though the buildings on the East side of Elgar Road are part of Box Hill)

== Public transport ==
=== Tram ===
- Route 109 (Melbourne Trams) travels on Whitehorse Road through the suburb. It travels from Box Hill to Port Melbourne, and back.

=== Bus ===
- The nearest bus terminal lies at Box Hill Railway Station, where many buses terminate and depart from. Box Hill is a neighbouring suburb of Mont Albert.

=== Train ===
- The Mont Albert Railway Station, which was positioned on Churchill Street, ran through the suburb. Opened in August 1890, this three platform station ran along the Belgrave/Lilydale Line. Services offered were in towards the city (Flinders Street Station), or out to Blackburn, Belgrave or Lilydale, run by Metro Trains. The station was closed on 17 February 2023, as part of the Level Crossing Removal Project with the new Union station northern entrance in Mont Albert.

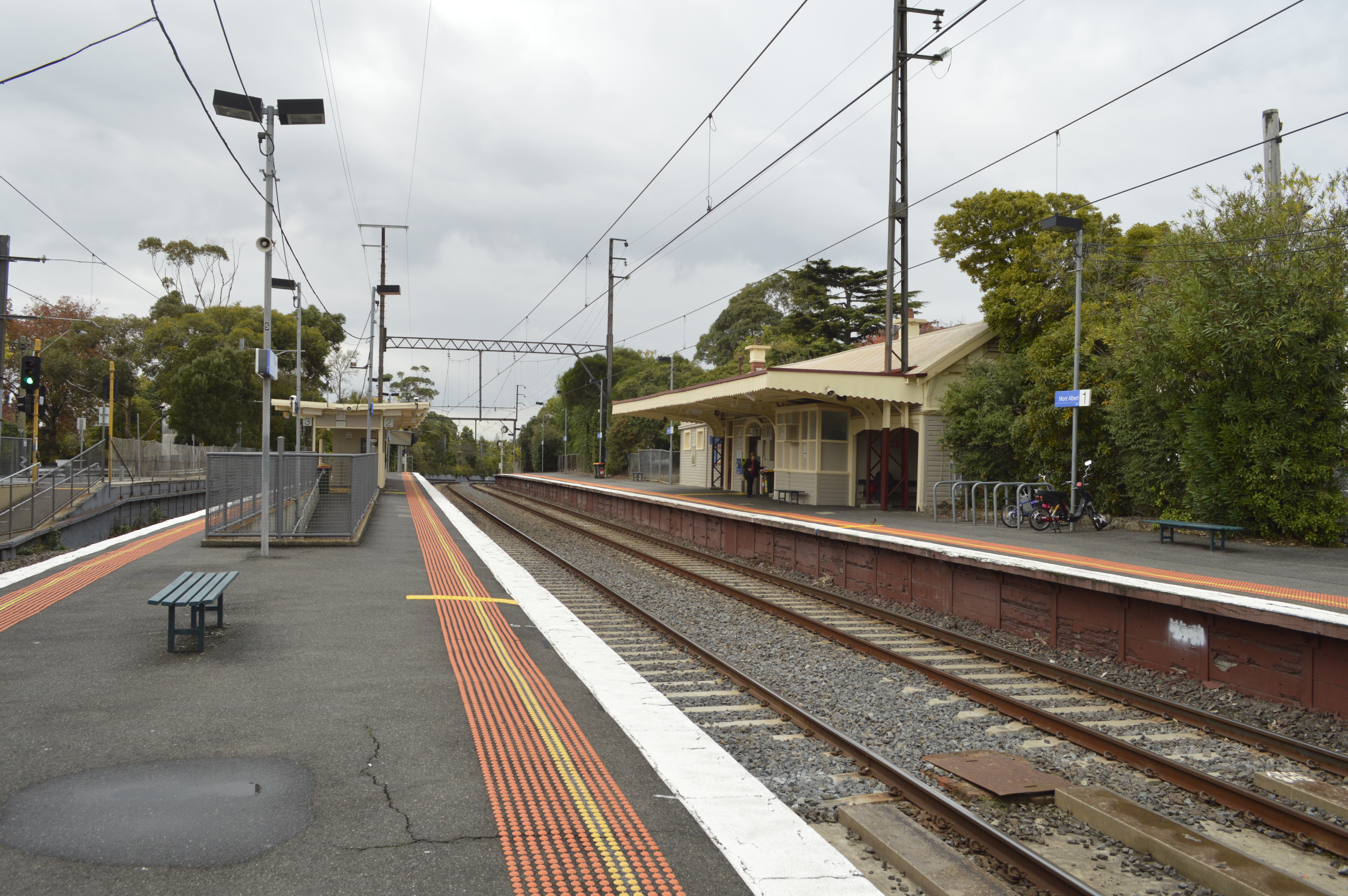
Mont Albert Railway Station before removal

== Major attractions ==
=== Walking trails ===
Mont Albert (and Mont Albert North) contain many walking trails. These include:

==== Heritage Trail ====
This is a Heritage Trail, about 5 km, developed by the City of Whitehorse. This starts and ends at the Mont Albert single storey railway station, constructed in 1911, and head east along Churchill Street.

==== Gawler Chain ====
A shared two-kilometre trail which runs along Bushy Creek in Mont Albert North. It starts near Koonung Secondary College (a local State School in Mont Albert North) and passes through several small parks and picnic grounds.

==== Koonung Trail ====
This trail runs through Elgar Park in Mont Albert North, and through the Koonung Creek Linear Park. It passes by wetlands, which are a key feature of this trail.

=== Commercial area ===
Mont Albert has many cafés, restaurants and eateries, mainly on Hamilton Street, Whitehorse Road and Mont Albert Road. Hamilton Street also has retail stores, pharmacies, butchers and supermarkets. These stores are all accessible from the street.

== Sport ==
There are many sporting opportunities for people of all ages, and many clubs and facilities in the neighbouring suburbs. These include:

- Mont Albert Cricket Club
- Surrey Park Lacrosse Club
- ECHO Hockey Club

== Notable people ==
- Matt Rowell, AFL footballer
- Frank Sedgman, former world No. 1 tennis player
- Jake Fraser-McGurk

== Politics ==
State:

- In the 2018 Victorian State Election, the polling booth in Mont Albert returned the following votes:
  - Clark, Robert, Liberal Party of Victoria: 697 votes
  - Hamer, Paul, Labor Party of Victoria: 585 votes
  - Other candidates: 250 votes
- Despite citizens of Mont Albert favouring Robert Clark over Paul Hamer, Hamer was elected as the MP for Box Hill.
- After the distribution of preferences, Paul Hamer received 19,982 votes (52.10% of the vote), whilst Robert Clark received 18,369 votes (47.90% of the vote).

Federal:

- In the 2019 Australian Federal Election, the polling booth in Mont Albert returned the following votes:
  - Frydenberg, Josh, Liberal Party of Australia: 460 votes
  - Burnside, Julian, Australian Greens: 284 votes
  - Stewart, Jana, Australian Labor Party: 220 votes
  - Other candidates: 126 votes
- The citizens of Mont Albert favoured Josh Frydenberg to be returned for a third term. Frydenberg suffered a −6.4% swing in Kooyong, however, he still retained the seat described as a 'blue ribbon' seat.
- After the distribution of preferences, Josh Frydenberg received 55,159 votes (55.70% of the vote), whilst Julian Burnside received 43,870 votes (44.30% of the vote).

== See also ==
- City of Box Hill – Mont Albert was previously within this former local government area.
- List of Government Schools in Victoria – A list of Government schools, including Mont Albert Primary School
- Belgrave Railway Line
- Lilydale Railway Line
