= Mont Albert North, Victoria =

Mont Albert North
- Suburb
- Interactive map of Mont Albert North
- Coordinates: 37°48′29″S 145°6′50″E
- Country: Australia
- State: Victoria
- City: Melbourne
- LGA: City of Whitehorse
- Location: 13 km (8.1 mi) from Melbourne
- Established: 1990s

Government
  - State electorate: Box Hill
  - Federal division: Menzies

Area
  - Total: 2.2 km^{2} (0.85 sq mi)

Population
  - Total: 5,609 (2021 census)
  - Density: 2,550/km^{2} (6,600/sq mi)
- Postcode: 3129
Suburbs around Mont Albert North
Balwyn North	Doncaster	Doncaster
Balwyn	Mont Albert North	Box Hill North
Surrey Hills	Mont Albert	Box Hill

Mont Albert North is a suburb of Melbourne, Victoria, Australia, 13 km east of Melbourne's Central Business District, located within the City of Whitehorse local government area. Mont Albert North recorded a population of 5,609 at the 2021 census.

The northern border of the suburb is the Eastern Freeway and the southern border is Kenmare Street, while Elgar Road constitutes the boundary in the east. The western boundary is a series of back streets running close to Union Road. This boundary follows the municipal boundary with the City of Boroondara.

In the 12-month period to January 2020 Mont Albert North reported a median house price of A$1.15 million for a three bedroom house.

== History ==
The area was originally called Mont Albert North. It was then renamed Box Hill North, then subsequently renamed back to Mont Albert North.

The Mont Albert North Post Office opened on 1 July 1957 and closed in 1993.

=== Heritage listings ===
The following places in Mont Albert North are listed on the Victorian Heritage Register:

- Chapel of St Joseph (former), at 27-29 Strabane Avenue

== Milk bar ==
One of the famous sites in Mont Albert North has been the milk bar, located on the corner of Access Road and Arcade Road. For many years this has been the meeting place of many young adults within the area and it continues to be an iconic part of Mont Albert North. In mid-2008 the popular soap opera Neighbours was filmed at the milk bar. In early 2021, the milk bar was sold and re-constructed into a café called "Matilda".

== Education ==
- Koonung Secondary College on Elgar and Cairo Roads, established in 1966
- Box Hill Senior Secondary College (formerly Box Hill Technical School)
- Box Hill University of the Third Age, found just north of Box Hill Senior on Strabane Avenue

== See also ==
- City of Box Hill – Mont Albert North was previously within this former local government area.
