= Koonung Creek Trail =

Path in Melbourne, Australia

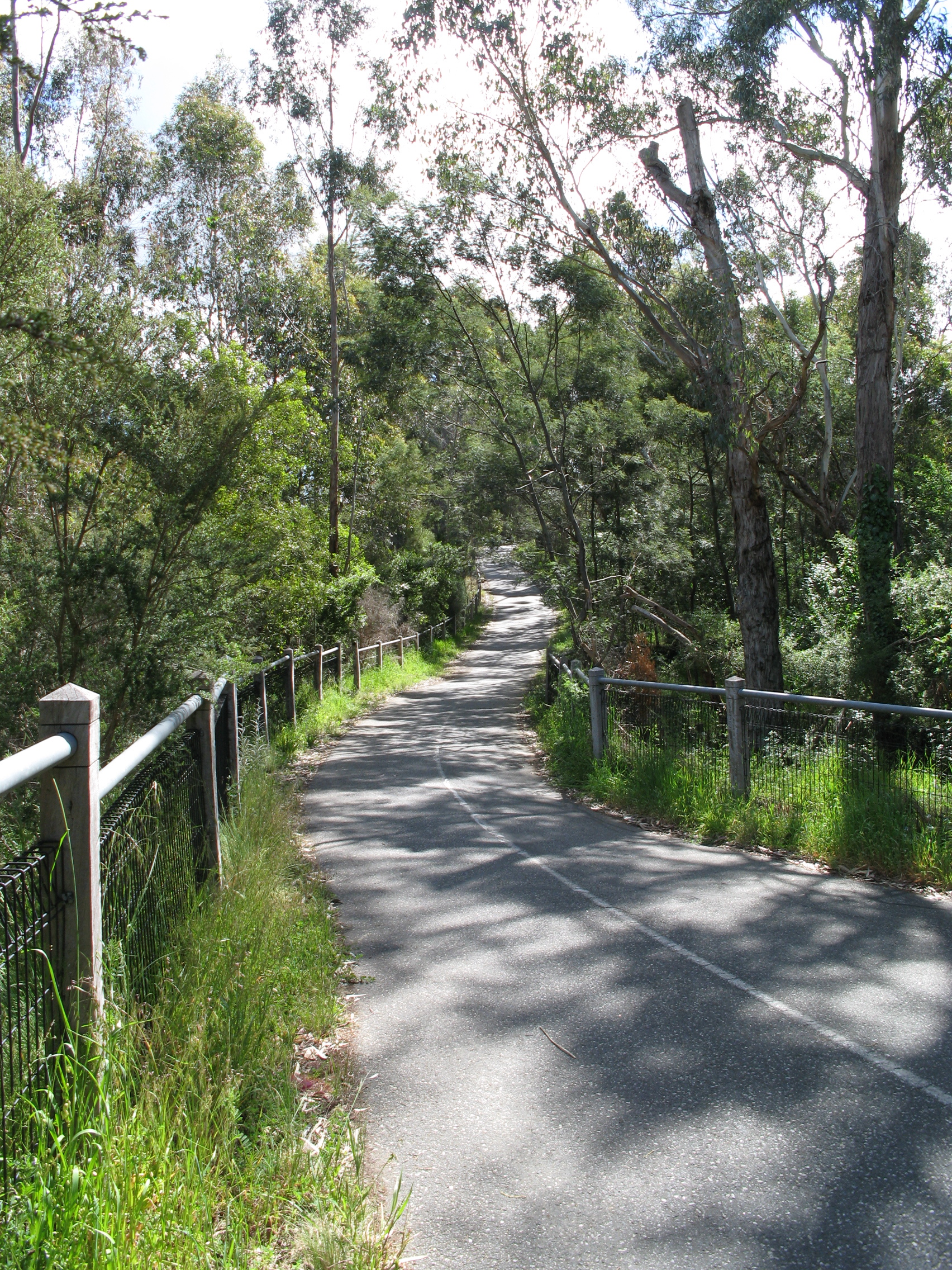
- The Koonung Creek Trail west of Blackburn Road.
- Length: 13.5km
- Location: Melbourne, Victoria, Australia
- Difficulty: Easy
- Surface: Concrete and bitumen
- Hills: Some minor hilly sections
- Water: None
- Train: None

The Koonung Creek Trail, also known as the Koonung Trail, is a shared use path for cyclists and pedestrians, which follows Koonung Creek in the eastern suburbs of Melbourne, Victoria, Australia. The trail also follows the course of the Eastern Freeway as it too, follows the course of the Koonung Creek, and has good connections to on-road paths.

== Following the path ==
The path is easy to follow as it travels parallel to the Eastern Freeway. 600 m west of Middleborough Road the trail is located on the south side of the freeway. East of that point it runs along the north side of the freeway.

Near the Bushy Creek Trail turnoff is a small wetland area with purple swamphens and the occasional little pied cormorant. Koonung Creek Reserve also contains a small wetland which contains some native wildlife.

== Connections ==
Yarra River Trail in the west. Intersects the Bushy Creek Trail in the middle. Since the completion of the EastLink project (2008), the trail links to the Mullum Mullum Creek Trail in the east, just 80 m west of Beckett Rd.

Leaving the trail at Middleborough Rd and travelling north 1.9 km by road, leads to the Ruffey Creek Trail near George St. Leaving the trail at Middleborough Rd and travelling south 1.4 km by road, leads to the Bushy Creek Trail via Springfield Rd.

The west end is at 37.781635°S 145.062340°E, and the east end is at 37.804200°S 145.204411°E.
