= Safety Beach =

- Suburb
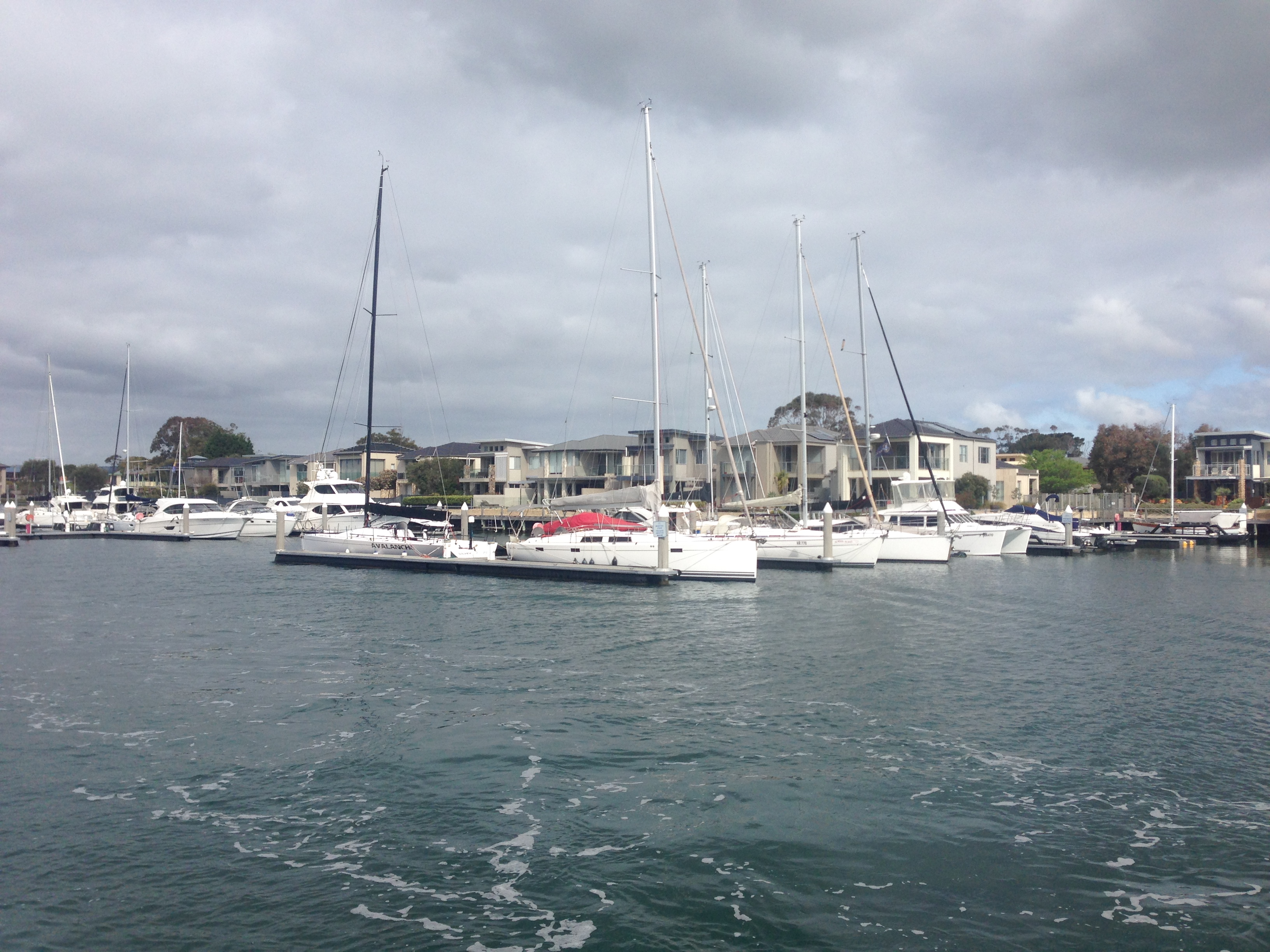
- Boats at Martha Cove, Safety Beach

- Interactive map of Safety Beach
- Coordinates: 38.322°S 144.986°E
- Country: Australia
- State: Victoria
- City: Melbourne
- LGA: Shire of Mornington Peninsula
- Location: 56 km (35 mi) from Melbourne; 9 km (5.6 mi) from Rosebud

Government
  - State electorate: Nepean
  - Federal division: Flinders

Area
  - Total: 6 km^{2} (2.3 sq mi)

Population
  - Total: 6,328 (2021 census)
  - Density: 1,050/km^{2} (2,730/sq mi)
- Postcode: 3936
Suburbs around Safety Beach
Port Phillip		Mount Martha
Port Phillip	Safety Beach
Dromana		Red Hill

Safety Beach is a seaside suburb on the Mornington Peninsula in Melbourne, Victoria, Australia, 56 km (35 mi) south of Melbourne's city centre, located within the Shire of Mornington Peninsula local government area. Safety Beach recorded a population of 6,328 at the 2021 census.

Safety Beach occupies slightly less than half the area of land between the foothills of Mount Martha and Arthurs Seat and borders Port Philip Bay to its west.

Martha Cove is a large inland harbour and residential development at Safety Beach, named after its location in a cove at the foot of Mount Martha. The project, which began in 2004, initially sparked protests by residents. After experiencing considerable financial difficulties, Martha Cove recovered and became a thriving residential community.

Golfers play at the Mount Martha Valley Golf Club on Country Club Drive, or at the Safety Beach Golf Course nearby.

There used to be an abattoir nearby to slaughter local farm animals. Blood and offal from the abattoir operations were dumped into the Sheepwash and Dunns Creeks, and carried into Dromana Bay at Safety Beach. That attracted sharks and led to people calling Safety Beach “Shark Bay” for some years. Eventually, the state Health Department ordered the abattoir to clean up its operations and Safety Beach retains the name given to it by John Aitken in 1836.

== Beach activities ==
The area has a calm, sandy bay and a swimming beach which is popular for boating. The foreshore reserve has an attractive children's playground and BBQ areas with shading. Safety Beach Sailing Club was established in 1967. Safety Beach Sailing Club has hosted many State and National titles and SBSC sailors are recognised by the sailing community for their excellence in sailing with success at regattas and at State, National and International level.

== History ==
Many believe Safety Beach to originally have been named 'Shark Bay', however this isn't true. No official maps ever recorded the name "Shark Bay"; the nickname was used only informally for a period after blood and offal from a nearby abattoir was discharged into local creeks, attracting large amounts of sharks into Domana Bay. The area of port Phillip bay is called Dromana Bay and the first domestic subdivision around 1912 was called Dromana estate and was the blocks of land off Marine Drive and Dromana Parade from Pt Nepean road to around Dunns creek. Safety Beach gets its name from a journal entry of a trading vessel that run aground in storm and they were able to off load the livestock safely. In 1841, Hugh Jamieson purchased 5,120 acres (2,070 ha), or eight square miles, of land from the Crown for £1 an acre under the terms of the short-lived Special Survey regulations.

The purchase included all of the present suburb of Safety Beach . The area is known as Jamieson's Special Survey in cadastral surveys. The survey extended east as far as Bulldog Creek Rd. Henry Dunn had leased the Survey from 1846 until 1851 and was succeeded by tenants such as the Griffith, Eaton, Peatey, McLear, Clydesdale, Wilson, Cottier and Gibson families, which were involved with the History of Dromana. Edward Louis Tassell leased the northern 1,000 acres (4.0 km^{2}) for some time near the creek that is named after him.

Big Clarke William John Turner Clarke later owned the survey, and sold the northern 1000 or so acres to John Vans Agnew Bruce. Maria Stenniken, who married Godfrey Burdett Wilson, used to work at Bruce's house as a servant during the summer. At the eastern end of the Survey, many of the pioneers worked at goldmining for Bernard Eaton. (Sources: A Dreamtime of Dromana, Lime Land Leisure, Rate records, 1888 Post office directory.)

Safety Beach Post Office opened on 1 October 1953 and closed in 1974.

== Notable people ==
- George Calombaris

== See also ==
- Shire of Flinders – Safety Beach was previously within this former local government area.
