= Henry Dendy =

Mates only

- Born: 24 May 1800; Abinger, Surrey, England
- Died: 11 February 1881 (aged 80); Walhalla, Victoria, Australia
- Occupations: Brewer, grazier, land speculator, landowner
- Known for: Founder of Brighton, Victoria, Australia

Henry Dendy (24 May 1800 – 11 February 1881) was an English settler in the colony of Victoria, Australia. He was a brewer, grazier, and land speculator.

== Biography ==
Henry Dendy was born in Abinger, Surrey, England, on 24 May 1800.

Dendy is best known for his purchase in 1841 of 5,120 acres (2,070 ha), or eight square miles, of land approximately 12 km (7.5 mi) south-east of Melbourne, Victoria, Australia. The land, known as Dendy's Special Survey, was purchased from the Crown for one pound an acre under the terms of the short-lived Special Survey regulations.

He established the township of Brighton on his land purchase. Dendy is also associated with Eltham, Victoria, where he was an early settler and operated a flour mill.

An economic depression hit the colony in 1843 and Dendy was bankrupted in 1845.

Dendy died at Walhalla, Victoria on 11 February 1881.

The Dendy Theatre, built in 1940 in Middle Brighton, was named after Henry Dendy. This subsequently developed into a national cinema chain, with Dendy Cinemas ultimately bearing his name.
