= Templestowe Lower =

- Suburb
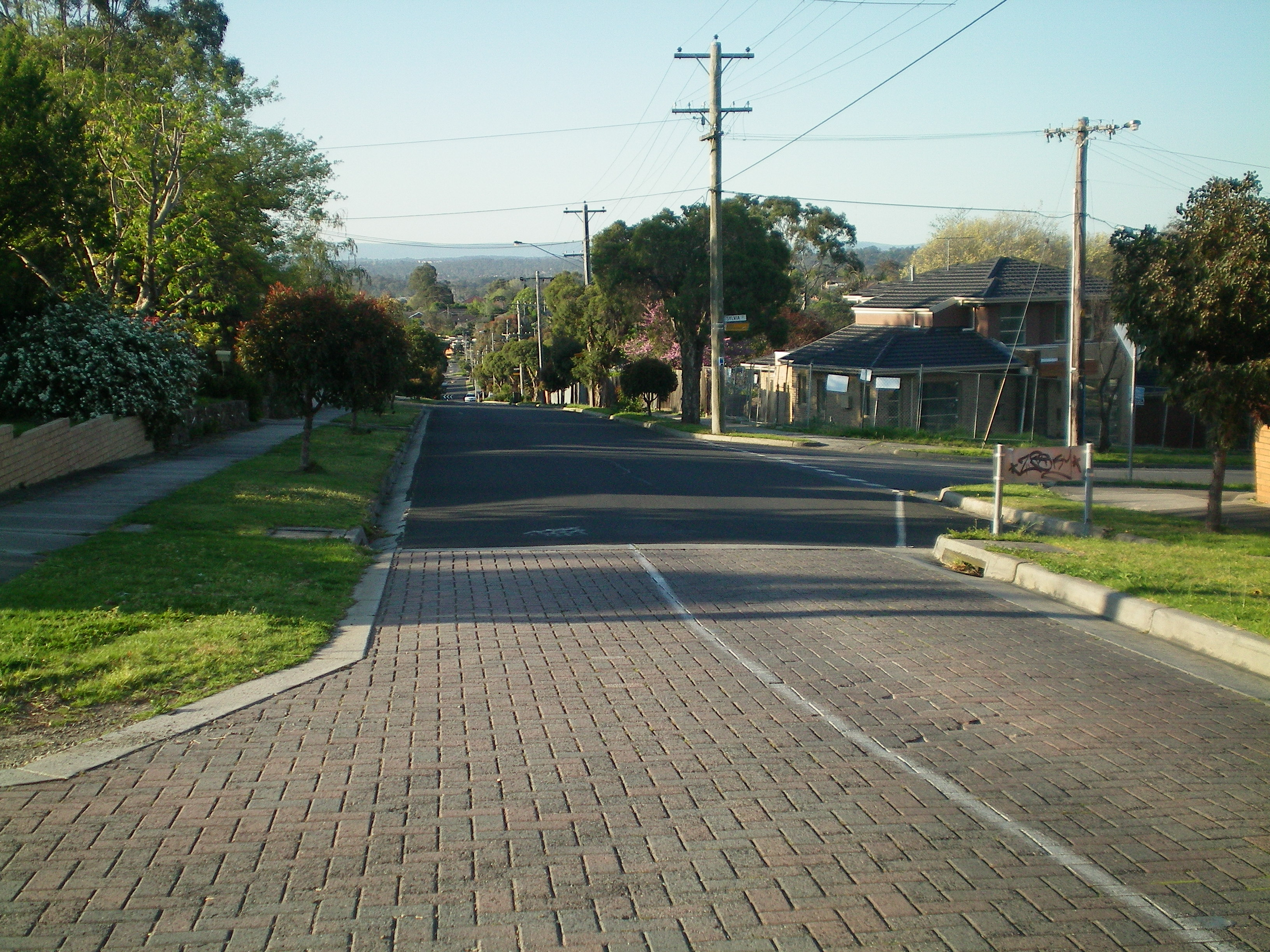

- Interactive map of Templestowe Lower
- Coordinates: 37.765°S 145.114°E
- Country: Australia
- State: Victoria
- City: Melbourne
- LGA: City of Manningham
- Location: 14 km (8.7 mi) from Melbourne

Government
  - State electorate: Bulleen
  - Federal division: Menzies

Area
  - Total: 6 km^{2} (2.3 sq mi)

Population
  - Total: 14,098 (SAL 2021)
- Postcode: 3107
Suburbs around Templestowe Lower
| Viewbank | Lower Plenty | Eltham |
| Bulleen | Templestowe Lower | Templestowe |
| Bulleen | Doncaster | Doncaster |

Templestowe Lower is a suburb of Melbourne, Victoria, Australia, 14 km northeast of Melbourne's Central Business District, located within the City of Manningham local government area. Templestowe Lower recorded a population of 14,098 at the 2021 census.

Its name reflects the fact that Lower Templestowe is situated on the Yarra River, but downstream from the neighbouring suburb of Templestowe. It is bounded in the west by Rose Avenue, Russell Street and Sheahans Road, in the north by the Yarra River, in the east by Ruffey Creek and Williamsons Road and in the south generally by Manningham Road.

It is home to primary schools and a secondary school; Templestowe Secondary College. Like neighbouring Templestowe, it is poorly serviced by public transportation, lying geographically between three existing rail lines (Hurstbridge and Lilydale/Belgrave). An excellent and frequent bus service exists, running from Lower Templestowe into the city or to the nearest train lines.

== History ==
The traditional owners of the land that came to be known as Lower Templestowe were the Wurundjeri people.

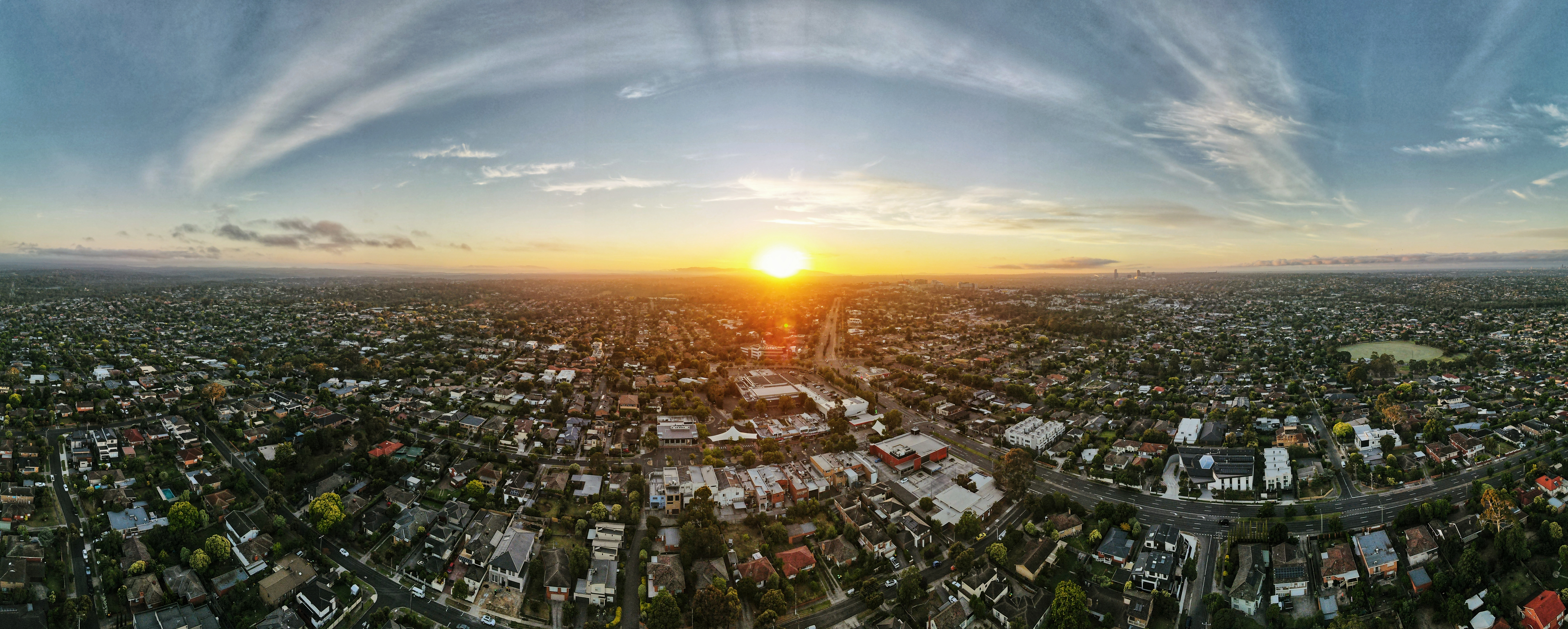
Templestowe sunrise

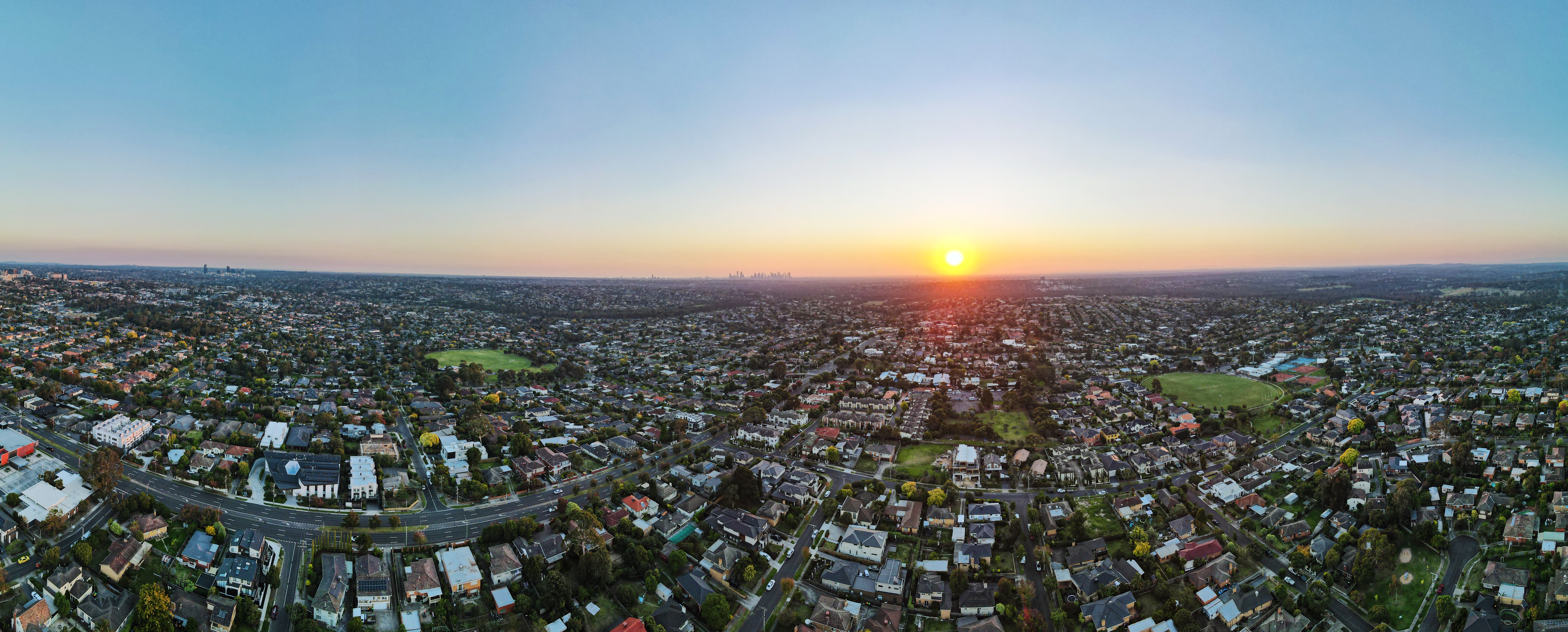
Templestowe Lower Sunset 2 April 2021

In 1841 Frederic Unwin, a Sydney solicitor, purchased 5,120 acres, or eight square miles of land, including most of the present suburb of Lower Templestowe, from the Crown, for one pound an acre under the terms of the short-lived Special Survey regulations. The area was sometimes known as Unwin's Special Survey.

Lower Templestowe Post Office opened around 1902 and closed in 1973.

Many European immigrants moved to Lower Templestowe in the 1970s.

== Points of interest ==
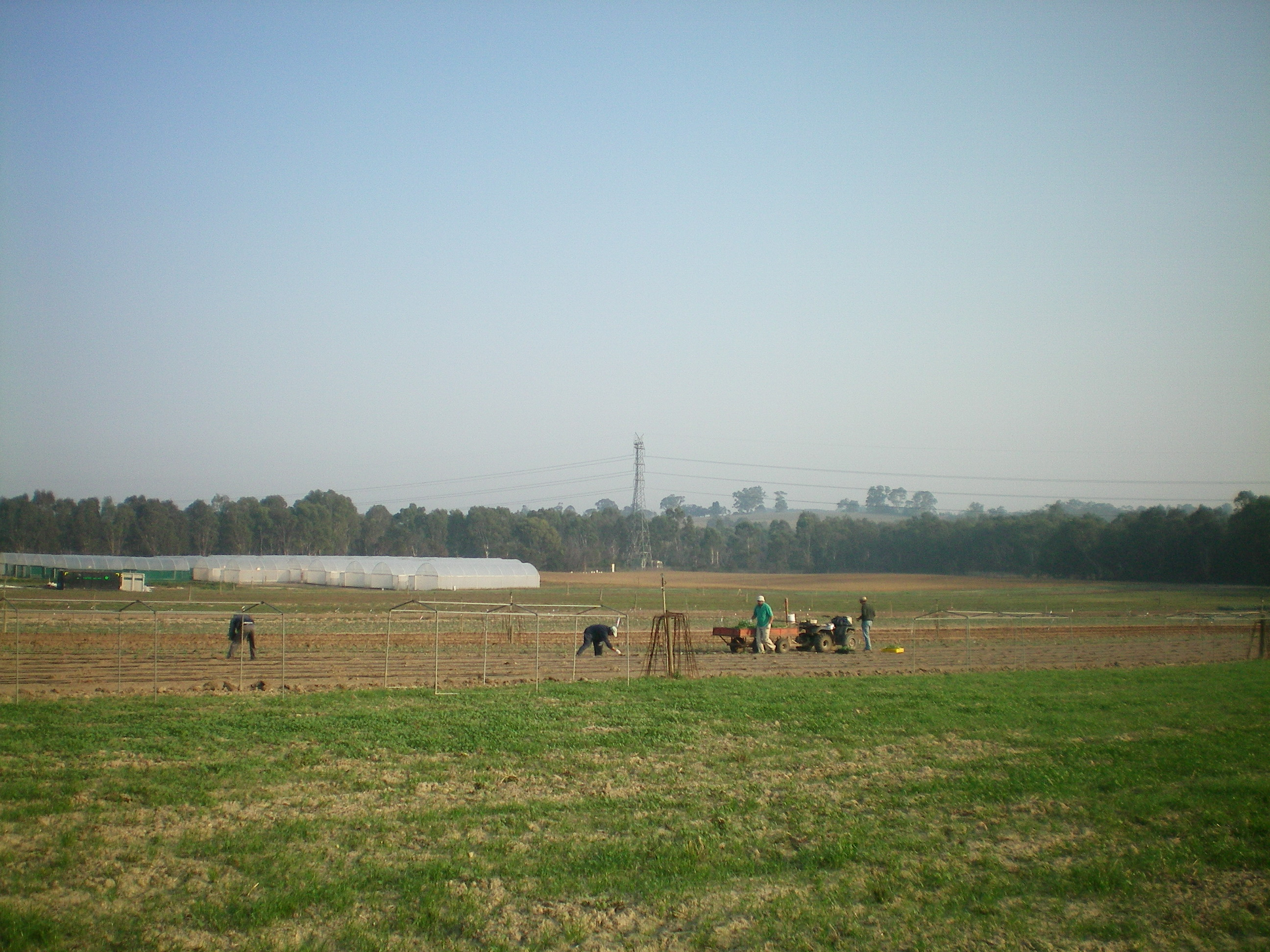
Henderson's seed farm

Lower Templestowe has one shopping centre, Macedon Square and Macedon Plaza. Templestowe Hotel, despite the name, is actually located in Lower Templestowe.

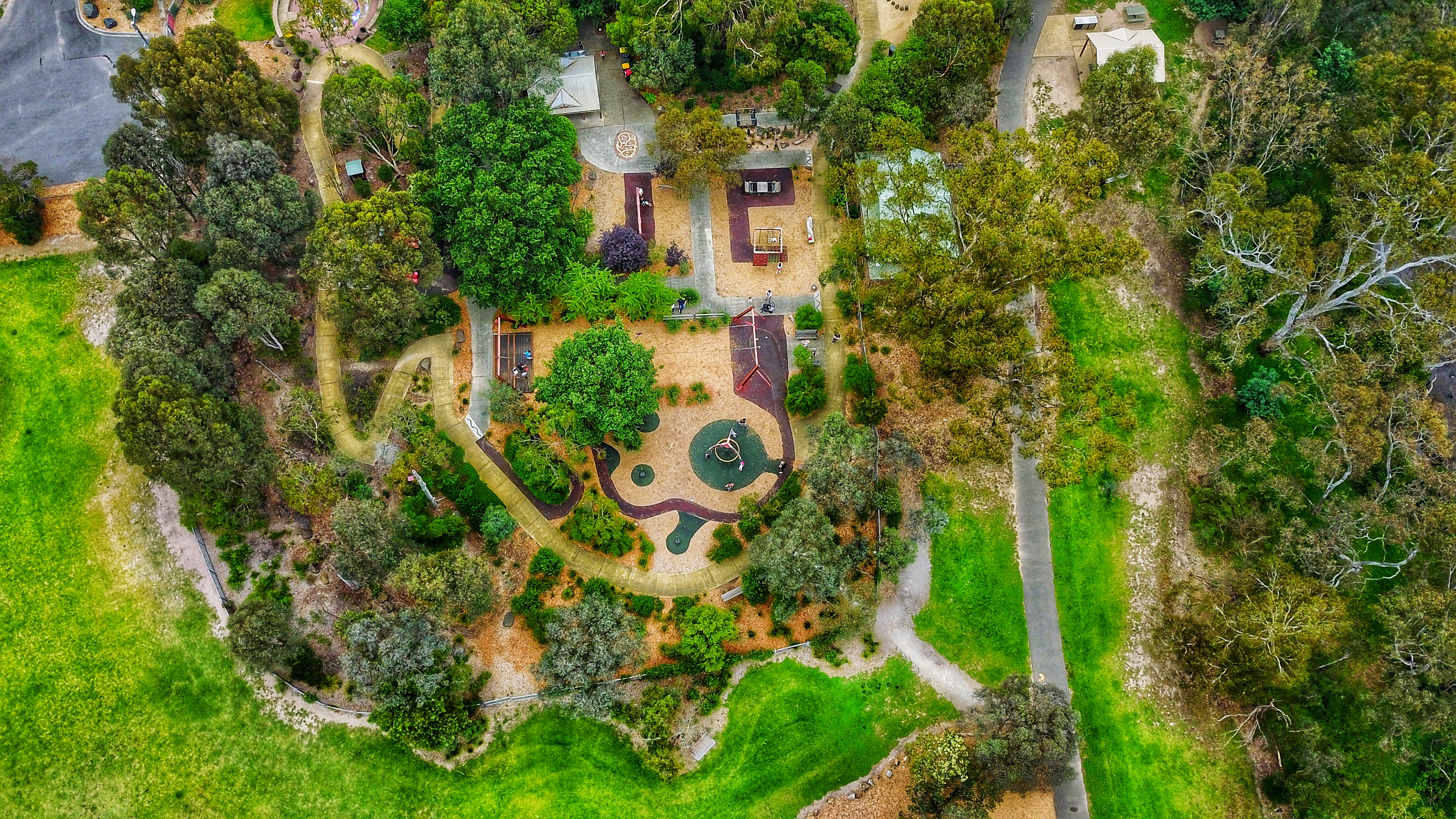
Topdown of the nature themed playground at Wombat Bend Park near Finns Reserve

Lower Templestowe boasts two parks by the Yarra River, Birrarung Park and Finns Reserve. Both parks offer walking tracks, and access to the river for swimming and rafting.

== Education ==
Lower Templestowe has 2 government primary schools, Templestowe Valley Primary School and Templestowe Heights Primary School, as well as a Catholic primary school, St Kevin's. There is also a high school, Templestowe College.

== Transport ==
Like all other suburbs in the Local Government Area of Manningham, Lower Templestowe does not have any tram or train services. Lower Templestowe is served solely by buses in terms of public transport.

Lower Templestowe's main roads include High Street, Lynwood Parade, Thompsons Road, Manningham Road and Williamsons Road.

== Notable residents ==
- Kim Brennan, Olympic rower.
- Scott Martin, shot putter, who is best known for appearing on Commonwealth Bank TV advertisements, which aired during the 2006 Commonwealth Games.
- Mark Wilson – Ran a dance studio on Thompsons Road until it was burnt down in 2008.
- Mathew Hilakari, Researcher, writer and politician, later became Member of the Victorian Legislative Assembly for the Electoral district of Point Cook.

== See also ==
- City of Doncaster & Templestowe – Templestowe Lower was previously within this former local government area.
