= Doncaster, Victoria =

Doncaster
- Suburb
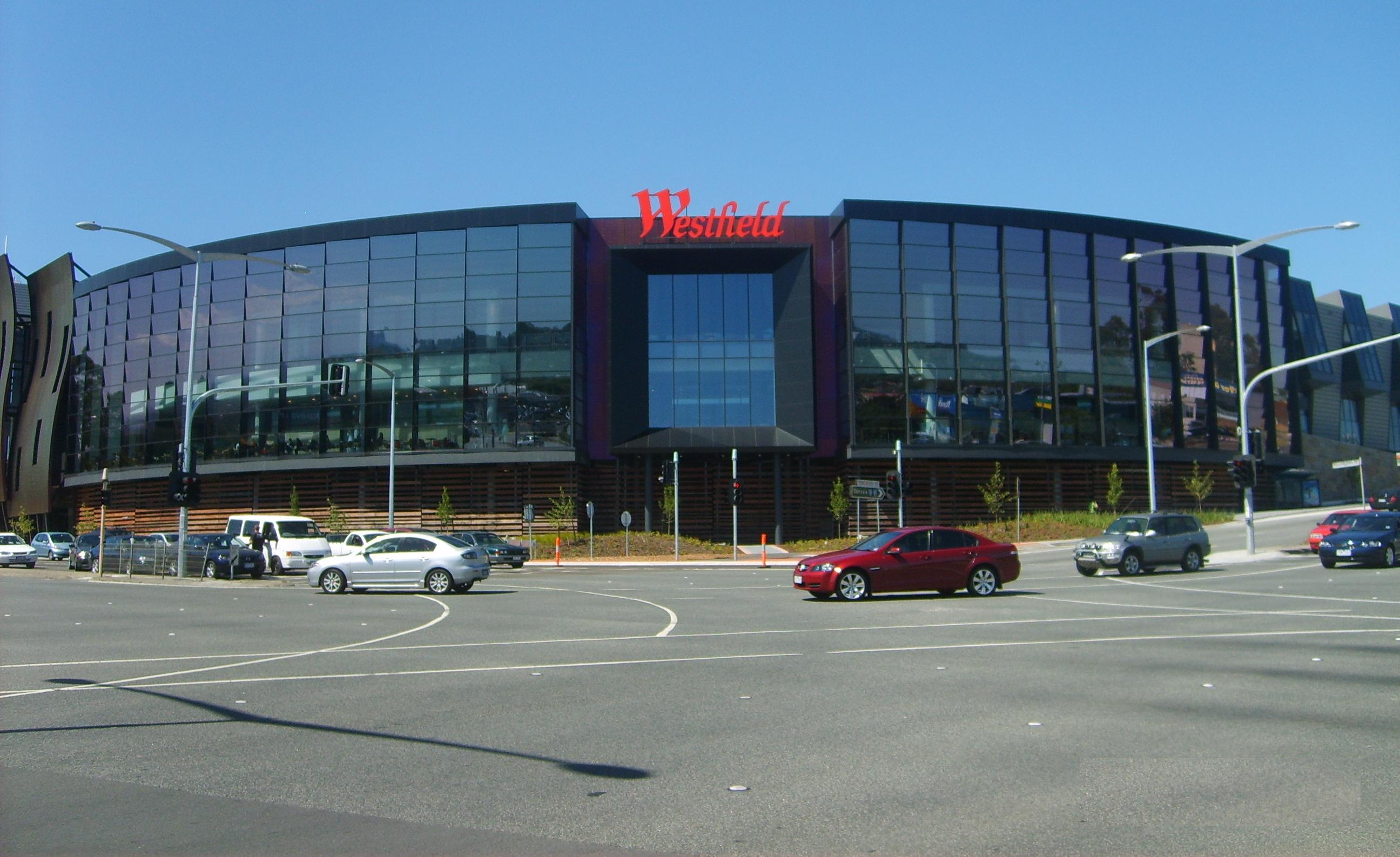
- The front of Westfield Doncaster

- Interactive map of Doncaster
- Coordinates: 37.78°S 145.124°E
- Country: Australia
- State: Victoria
- City: Melbourne
- LGA: City of Manningham
- Location: 18 km (11 mi) from Melbourne
- Established: 1860s

Government
  - State electorate: Bulleen
  - Federal division: Menzies

Area
  - Total: 8.9 km^{2} (3.4 sq mi)
- Elevation: 108 m (354 ft)

Population
  - Total: 25,020 (2021 census)
  - Density: 2,811/km^{2} (7,280/sq mi)
- Postcode: 3108
Suburbs around Doncaster
| Templestowe Lower | Templestowe | Templestowe |
| Bulleen | Doncaster | Doncaster East |
| Mont Albert North | Box Hill North | Blackburn North |

Doncaster (/ˈdɒŋkɑːstər/ DONK-ah-stər) is a suburb of Melbourne, Victoria, Australia, 18 km (11 mi) east of Melbourne's Central Business District, located within the City of Manningham local government area. Doncaster recorded a population of 25,020 at the 2021 census.

The suburb is situated on 8.9 km^{2} (3.4 sq mi) of land, around the top of the 120 m (390 ft) high Doncaster Hill. The suburb consists of a central area along the top of Doncaster Hill, which includes several historical buildings along Doncaster Road, the Westfield Doncaster Shopping Centre and surrounding high-rise apartments, while the rest of the suburb is typical of many of Melbourne's eastern suburbs, with extensive low-density housing.

== Geography ==
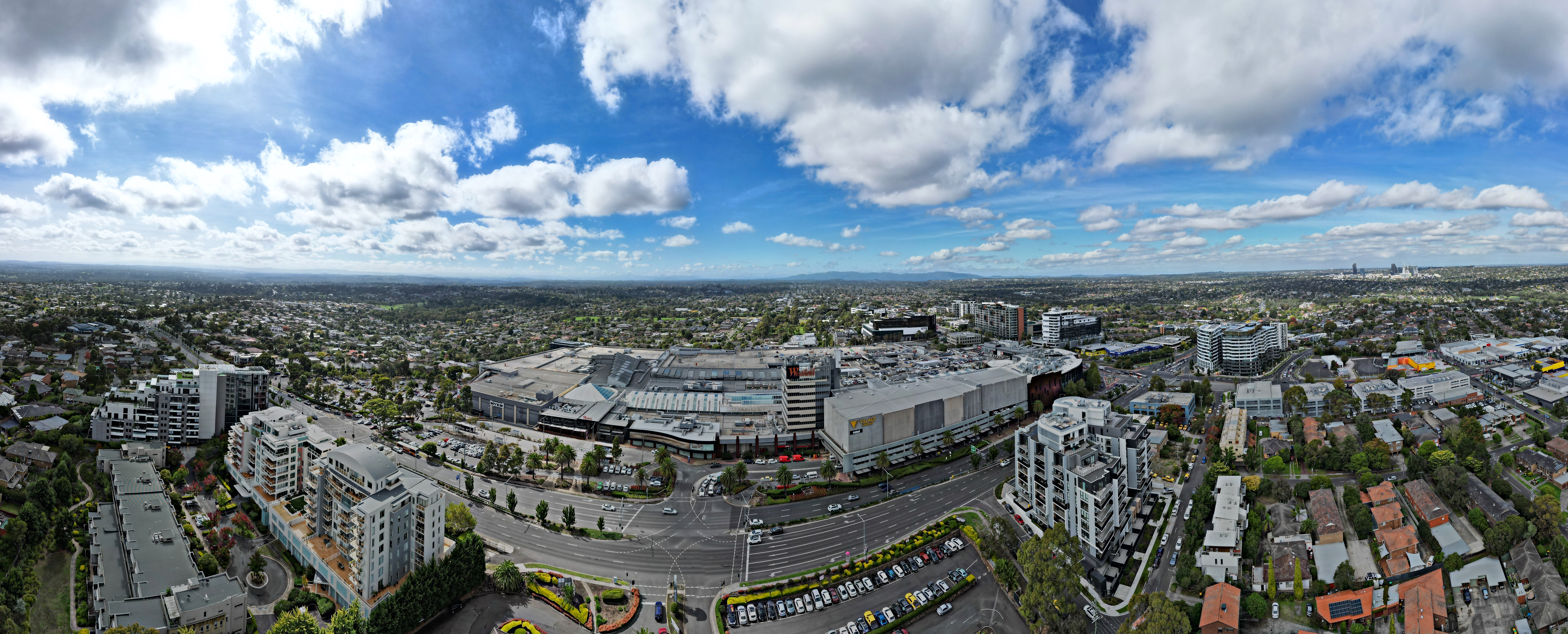
Aerial panorama of Westfield Doncaster and its surrounds on Doncaster Hill. April 2023. Mount Dandenong sits on the horizon.

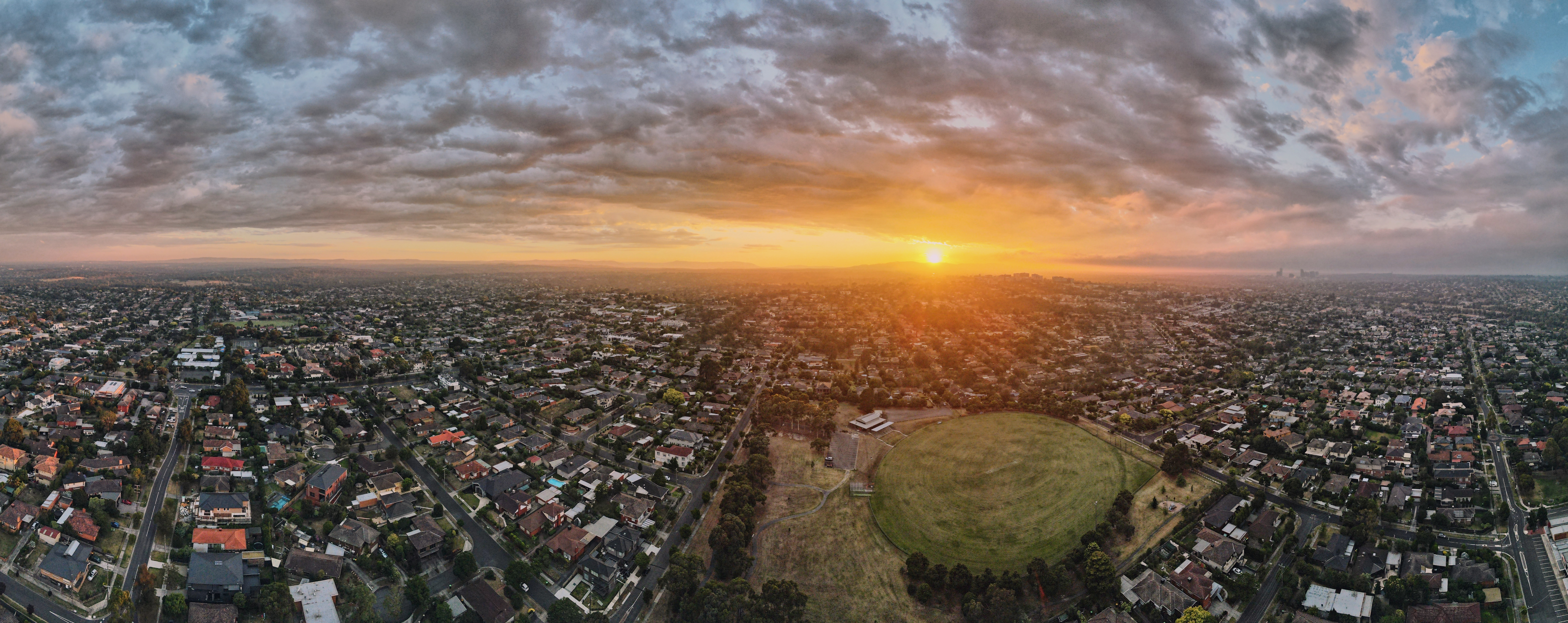
Doncaster sunrise panorama, January 2022

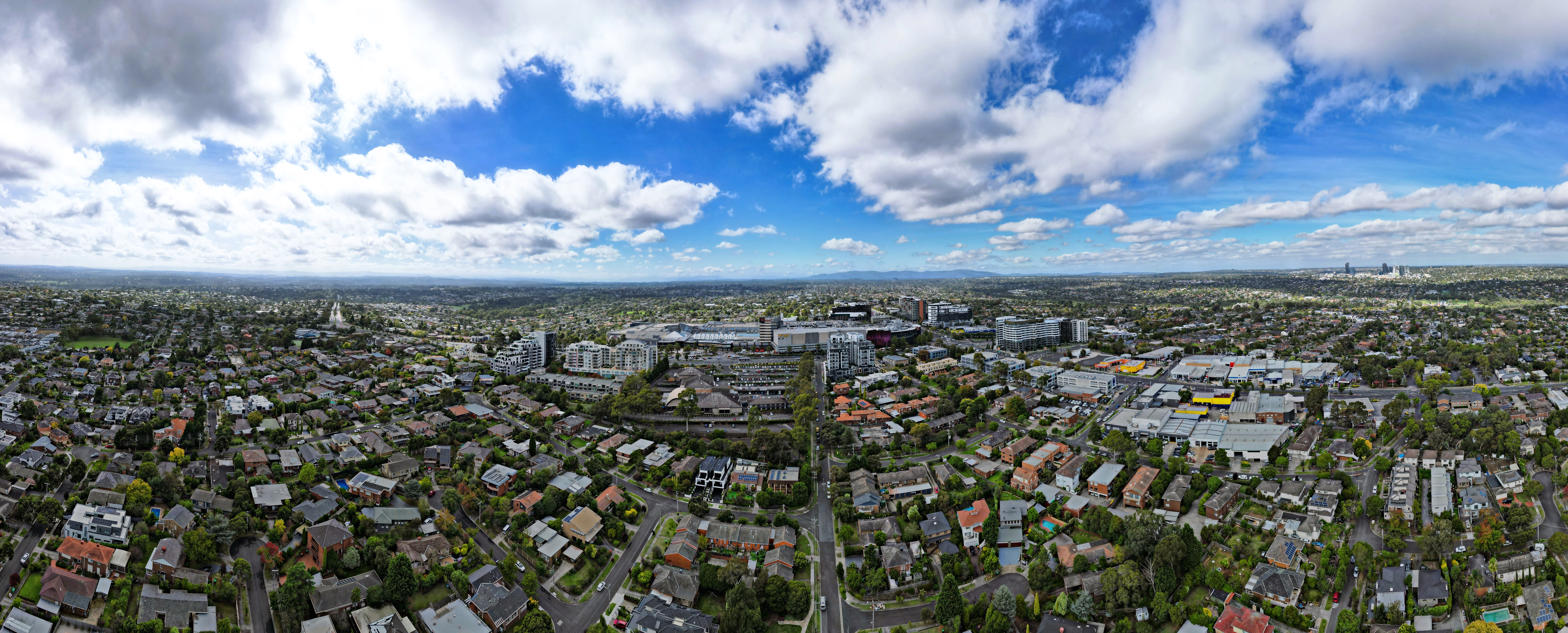
Aerial panorama of the elevation of Doncaster Hill and its surrounds, April 2023

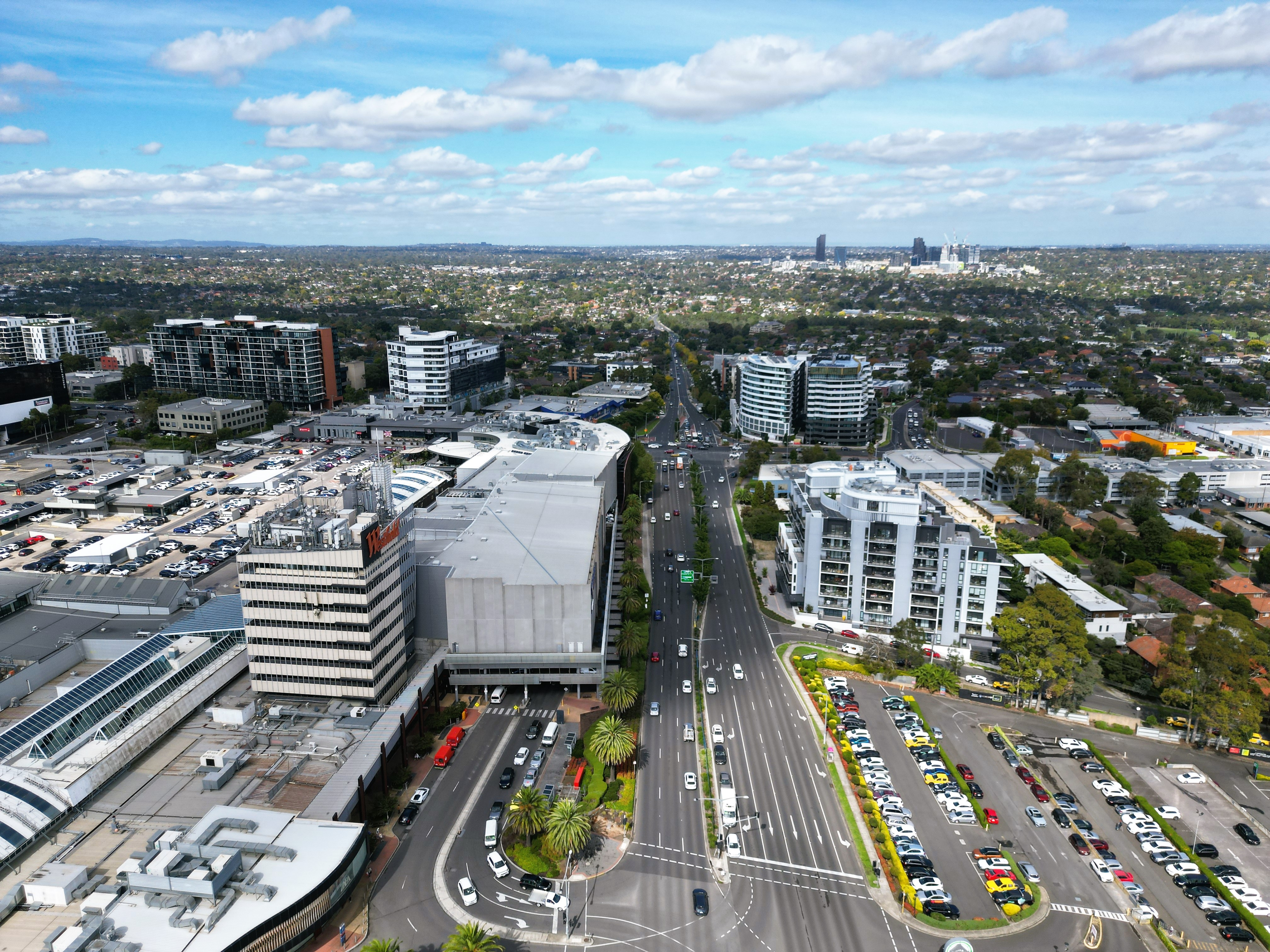
Aerial perspective of Westfield Doncaster from Williamsons Road looking south towards Box Hill, April 2023

The border of the suburb follows Koonung Creek from Doncaster Road, along the south of the suburb to Wetherby Road, which, with Victoria Street, forms the eastern border. The northern border follows Ruffey Creek, Williamsons Road, Manningham Road and Ayr Street, to the junction of Koonung Creek and Doncaster Road.

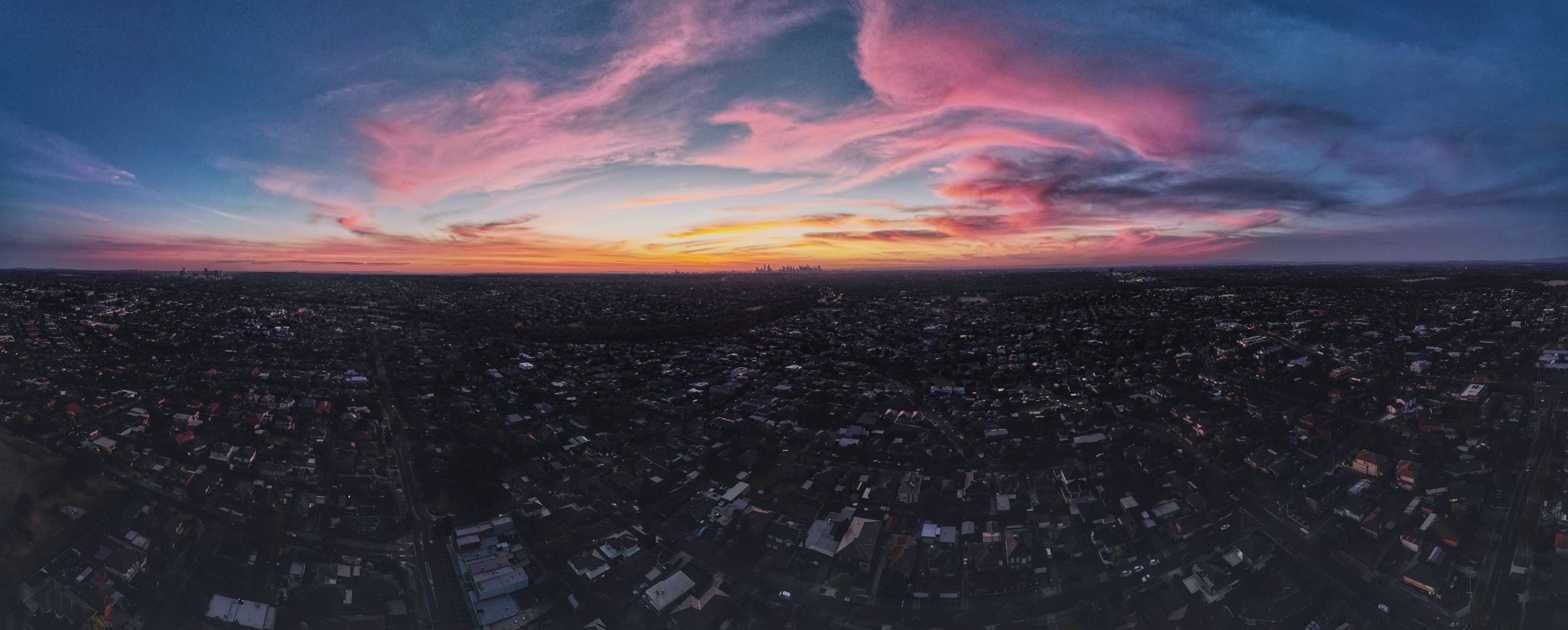
Doncaster sunset panorama, January 2022

The suburb is very hilly and due to its location has panoramic views in every direction with the view to the west through the city stretching out to Bacchus Marsh on a clear day and the Macedon Ranges, to the north the Kinglake Ranges, to the east Dandenong and Healesville ranges and south across the eastern suburbs to Glen Waverley/Mt Waverley.

As of April 2024, a project to install a water recycling plant is currently planned at Tram Road Reserve.

== History ==
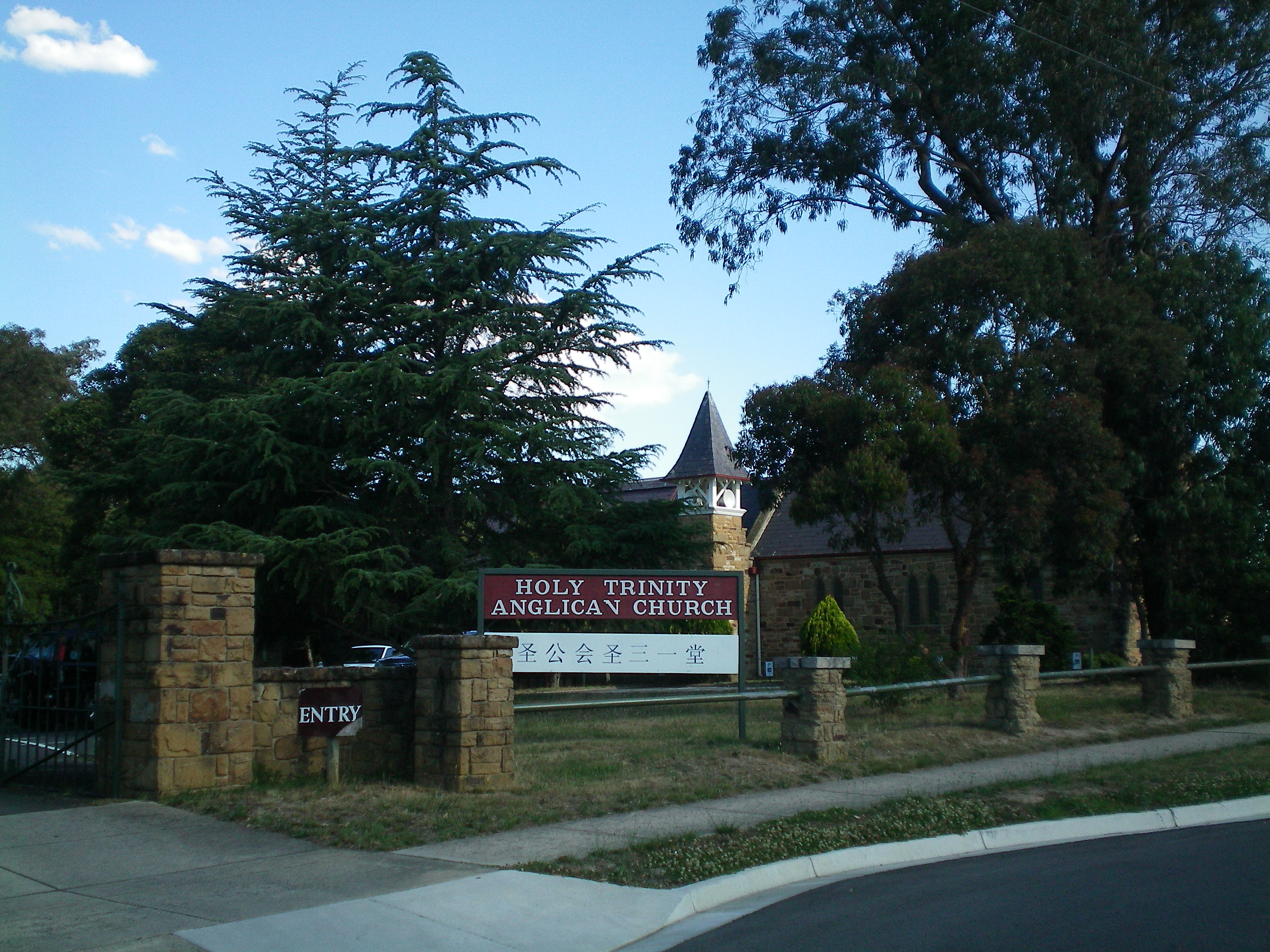
Holy Trinity Anglican Church

In 1841, Frederic Unwin, a Sydney solicitor, bought 5,120 acres (20.7 km^{2}) of land, including most of the present suburb of Doncaster, from the Crown for one pound an acre under the terms of the short-lived Special Survey regulations. The area was sometimes known as Unwin's Special Survey.

The Doncaster region was settled in the 1860s and 1870s, predominantly by German settler orchardists. The German community was named Waldau, but the name Doncaster gradually became commonly accepted. A Lutheran church was the first one in Doncaster in 1858. A Lutheran school opened in 1860 and a denominational school in 1861. Doncaster Post Office opened on 17 May 1860.

Schramm's Cottage, an historic stone cottage originally located on Doncaster Road (at the site of the fountain next to the Municipal Offices), was relocated to the site of the original Lutheran Church building in Victoria Street in the 1970s. The remains of the Waldau Cemetery, where approximately 150 burials took place between 1853 and 1888, are located on the grounds of Schramm's Cottage.

Doncaster was the location of the first electric tram to run in Melbourne in 1889. The tram started in Doncaster and ended in Box Hill (about 3.5 km (2.2 mi) away). Consequently, this was named "Tram Road". However, the service did not earn any profit, so it ended in 1896 due to feuds with land holders and financial problems. The main road through the suburb, Doncaster Road, was formerly named Main Street.

Doncaster remained an orchard area until the 1970s, with the majority of houses built from the 1950s to the 1980s.

In the 1960s and 1970s, the suburb was very sought after and many famous builders chose the area along with other similar suburbs like Glen Waverley and Mt Waverley to build their project homes with some very modern designs of which several still remain though, due to redevelopment, some are disappearing.

One good example of modern design and also being of a "cluster housing" project is the Winter Park estate on High St.

In the 1960s and 1970s, Doncaster had a predominantly English ancestral descent population but now has a large Chinese descent population and after several years of stagnant progress, has become a boom suburb for developers.

== Traditional ownership ==
The formally recognised traditional owners for the area in which Doncaster is located are the Wurundjeri people. The Wurundjeri people are represented by the Wurundjeri Woi Wurrung Cultural Heritage Aboriginal Corporation.

== Demographics ==
Historical population
| Year | Pop. | ±% |
|---|---|---|
| 2001 | 17,292 | — |
| 2006 | 17,879 | +3.4% |
| 2011 | 18,359 | +2.7% |
| 2016 | 20,946 | +14.1% |
| 2021 | 25,020 | +19.5% |

In the 2016 Census, there were 20,946 people in Doncaster. 44.6% of people were born in Australia. The next most common countries of birth were China 15.8%, Malaysia 4.0%, Greece 3.4%, Hong Kong 3.0% and Italy 2.7%. 40.5% of people spoke only English at home. Other languages spoken at home included Mandarin 17.6%, Cantonese 10.1%, Greek 7.8%, Italian 3.6% and Persian 2.5%. The most common responses for religion were No Religion 33.9%, Catholic 17.6% and Eastern Orthodox 10.2%.

== Transport ==
The major east–west road (Doncaster Road) leads from Kew to Donvale. The Eastern Freeway terminated at Doncaster Road at the western edge of the suburb from 1983 to December 1997. The section from Bulleen Road to Doncaster Road was originally built as two lanes each way. During this period Doncaster Road carried 60,000 vehicles a day as a major arterial road. Since then, the Eastern Freeway was extended along the course of the Koonung Creek to Springvale Road.

Throughout the 1970s, the Doncaster line was planned by the State Government to run down the middle of the Eastern Freeway, with land acquired for the line, but was sold in the 1980s. Various plans have also been made for extension of the tram route 48 north to Doncaster. Today the closest railway station to Doncaster remains Box Hill railway station, 3 km (1.9 mi) to the south.

Several bus services run in the area including routes to the CBD from the Doncaster Park & Ride bus station centre.

== Shopping ==
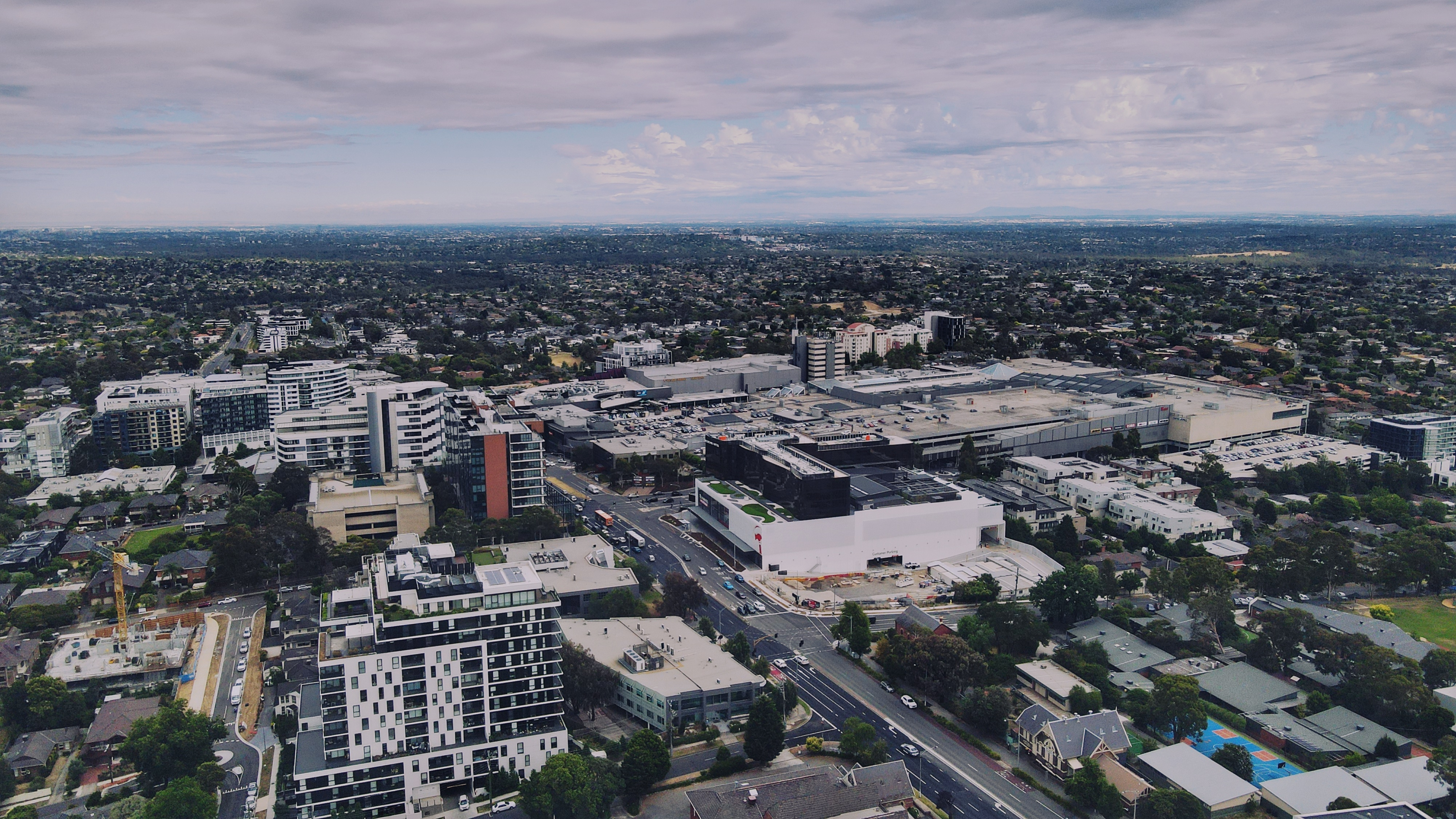
Doncaster Hill, January 2022

In 1969, Westfield Doncaster was built on the corner of Doncaster and Williamsons Roads and is a well-known shopping complex in Melbourne. In the early 1980s and again in the early 1990s, it was renovated and extended. From September 2006 to October 2008, it went through a large revitalisation, improving and enlarging the centre dramatically.

== Education ==
Schools located in Doncaster include:

- Doncaster Secondary College
- Birralee Primary School
- St. Gregory the Great Primary School
- Doncaster Primary School

== Sport ==
The Doncaster Hockey Club was established in October 1974. The council first allowed them to start the club at Timber Ridge Reserve. It was later moved to George Street before being allowed to establish a home at Mullum Mullum Reserve where it is today. In 1985 it was the first Australian Club to have a synthetic turf. The club has had six Olympians as members: Chris Ciriello, Russell Ford, Andrew Smith, Lachlan and James Elmer and Joshua Simmonds.

The suburb has an Australian Rules football team, The Doncaster Sharks, competing in the Eastern Football League.

The Doncaster Rovers SC are a Doncaster-based association football club, currently associated with Football Federation Victoria.

The Manningham Cricket Club caters for the area, playing in the Eastern Cricket Association and based at Rieschiecks Reserve, on the corner of Victoria Road and George Street.

The Doncaster Baseball Club was awarded a Diamond Award in 2008 after 10 of the 17 teams it fielded in 2007 made the finals, and three won their premiership titles. In recent years many players from the Dragons (men's 18+ team) have gone on to play for Victoria.

Golfers formerly played at the course of the Eastern Golf Club, on Doncaster Road. The club has since relocated, with the land now being developed into a housing estate.

== Government ==
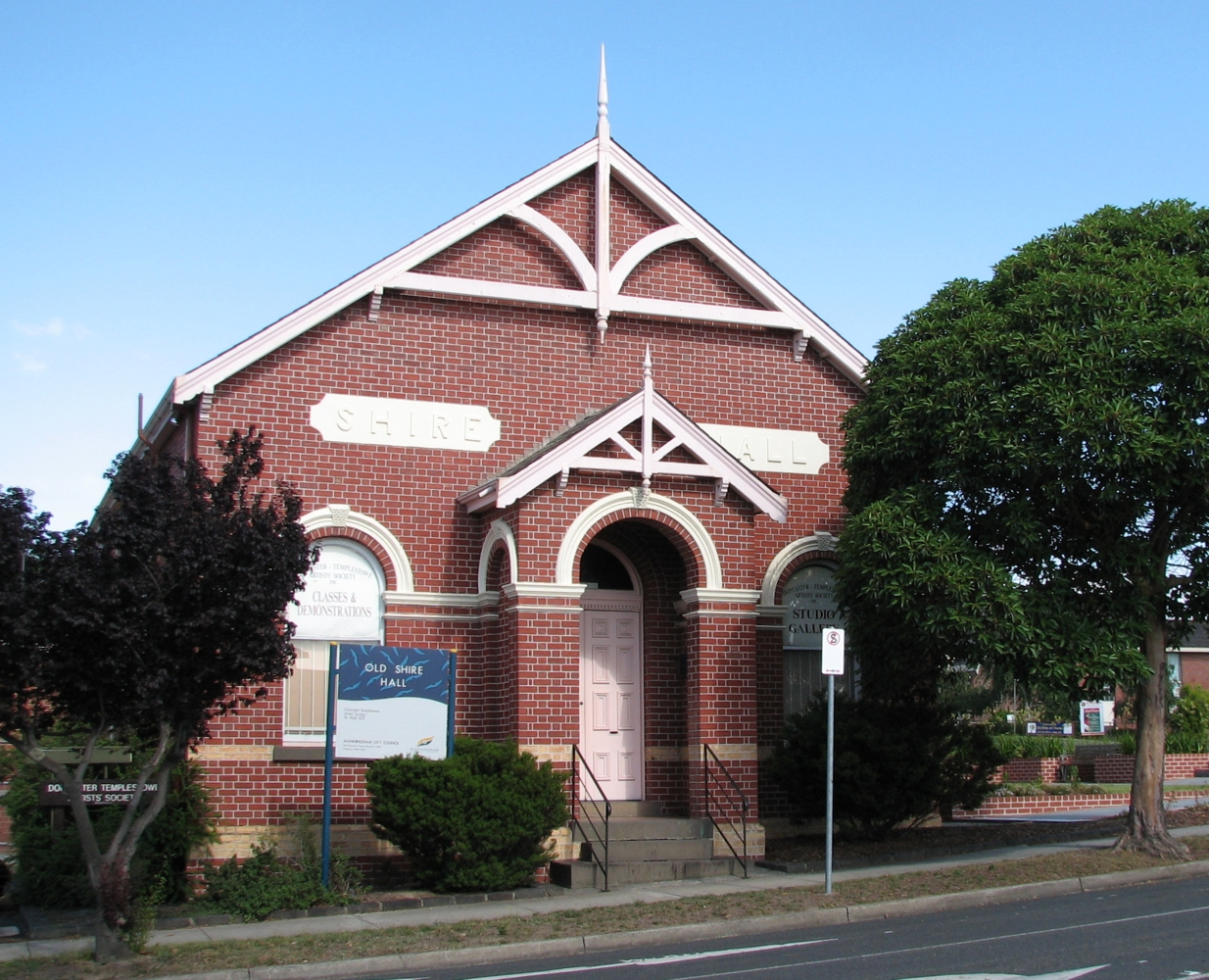
Doncaster Shire Hall

Prior to 2014, Doncaster formerly had a Victorian State Parliamentary seat named after it, the Electoral district of Doncaster. It is now in the electorate of Bulleen. The current member for Bulleen is Matthew Guy. Doncaster is encompassed within the Federal Seat of Menzies and Gabriel Ng is the local member. At the municipal level, it is located within the City of Manningham.

== Sister cities ==
- Century City, California, United States

== See also ==
- City of Doncaster and Templestowe – Doncaster was previously within this former local government area.
