= Bulleen =

- Suburb
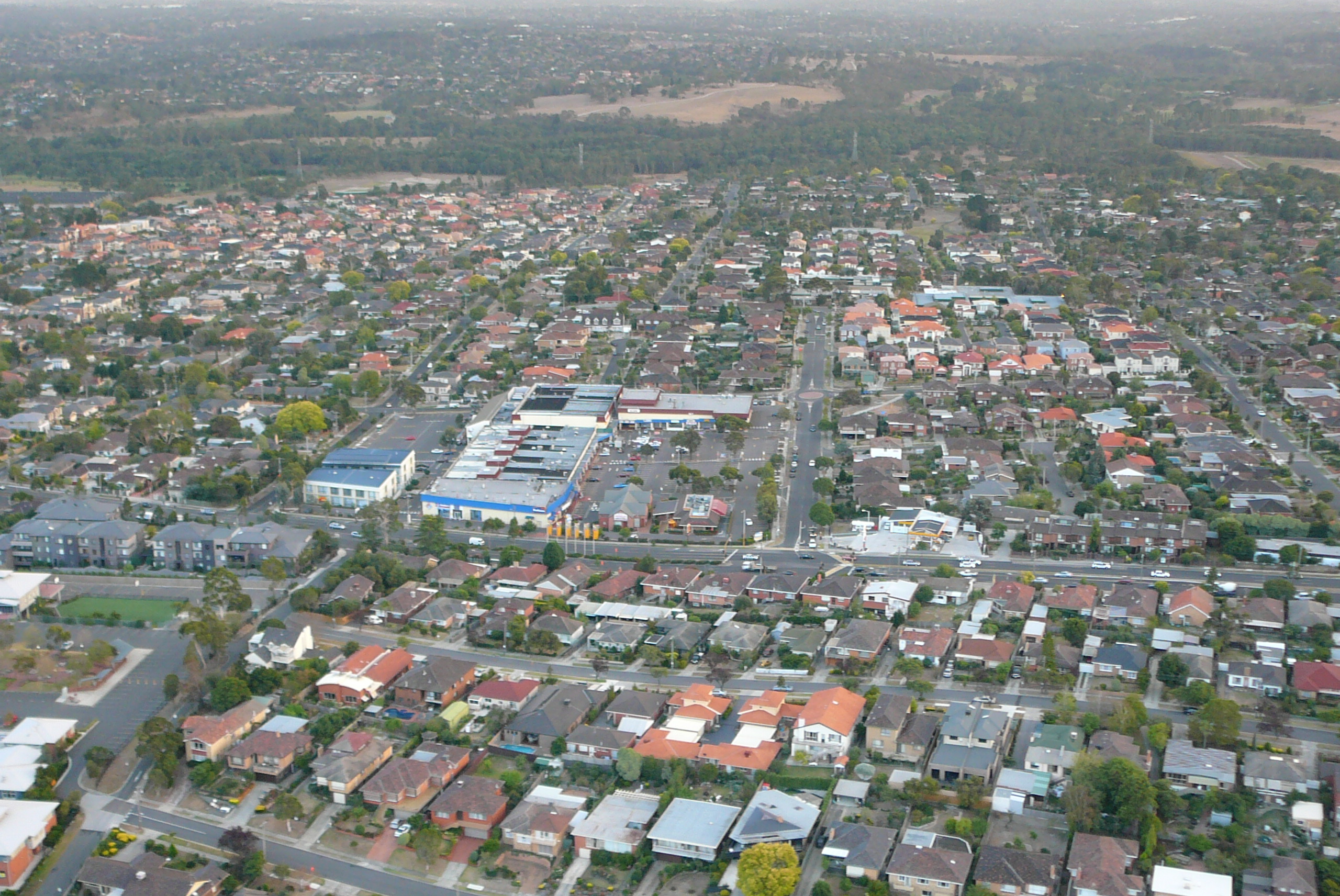
- Bulleen Plaza Shopping Centre and surrounding area

- Interactive map of Bulleen
- Coordinates: 37.77°S 145.09°E
- Country: Australia
- State: Victoria
- City: Melbourne
- LGA: City of Manningham
- Location: 13 km (8.1 mi) from Melbourne

Government
  - State electorate: Bulleen
  - Federal division: Menzies

Area
  - Total: 6.7 km^{2} (2.6 sq mi)
- Elevation: 55 m (180 ft)

Population
  - Total: 11,219 (2021 census)
  - Density: 1,674/km^{2} (4,340/sq mi)
- Postcode: 3105
Suburbs around Bulleen
Heidelberg	Viewbank	Templestowe Lower
Ivanhoe East	Bulleen	Templestowe Lower
Kew East	Balwyn North	Doncaster

Bulleen (/bʊliːn/ BULL-een) is an eastern suburb in Melbourne, Australia, 13 km north-east of the Melbourne central business district, located within the City of Manningham local government area. Bulleen recorded a population of 11,219 at the 2021 census.

== Etymology ==
The name Bulleen originates from the nearby Bolin Bolin Billabong. Buln-Buln translates to lyrebird, which is generally accepted to be the suburb's name meaning.

== Geography ==
=== Climate ===
Temperatures in Bulleen are known to fluctuate. During the 2009 southeastern Australia heat wave the suburb was reportedly around one degree cooler (at 43 °C) than in the city, but during a heat wave just the next month it peaked at a record 49 °C, on 7 February – compared to 46 °C in the city.

== History ==
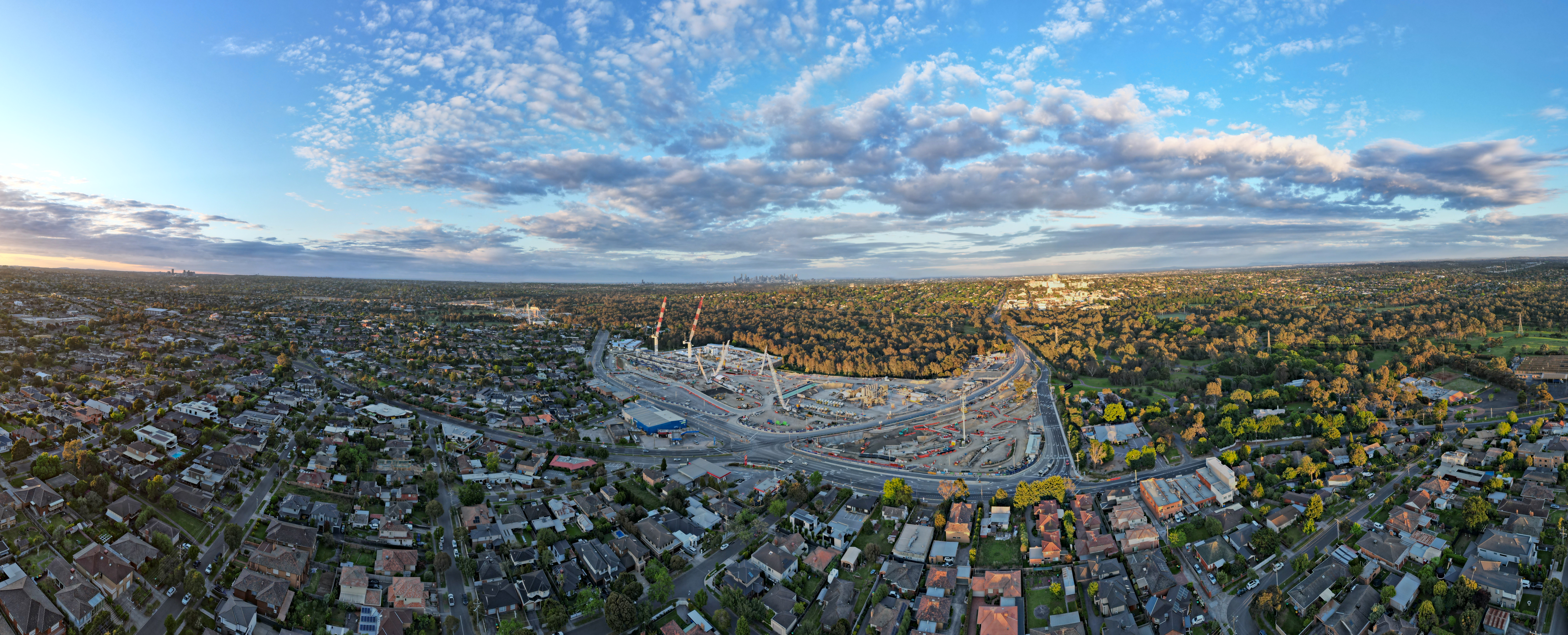
Bulleen aerial panorama with the North East Link Build

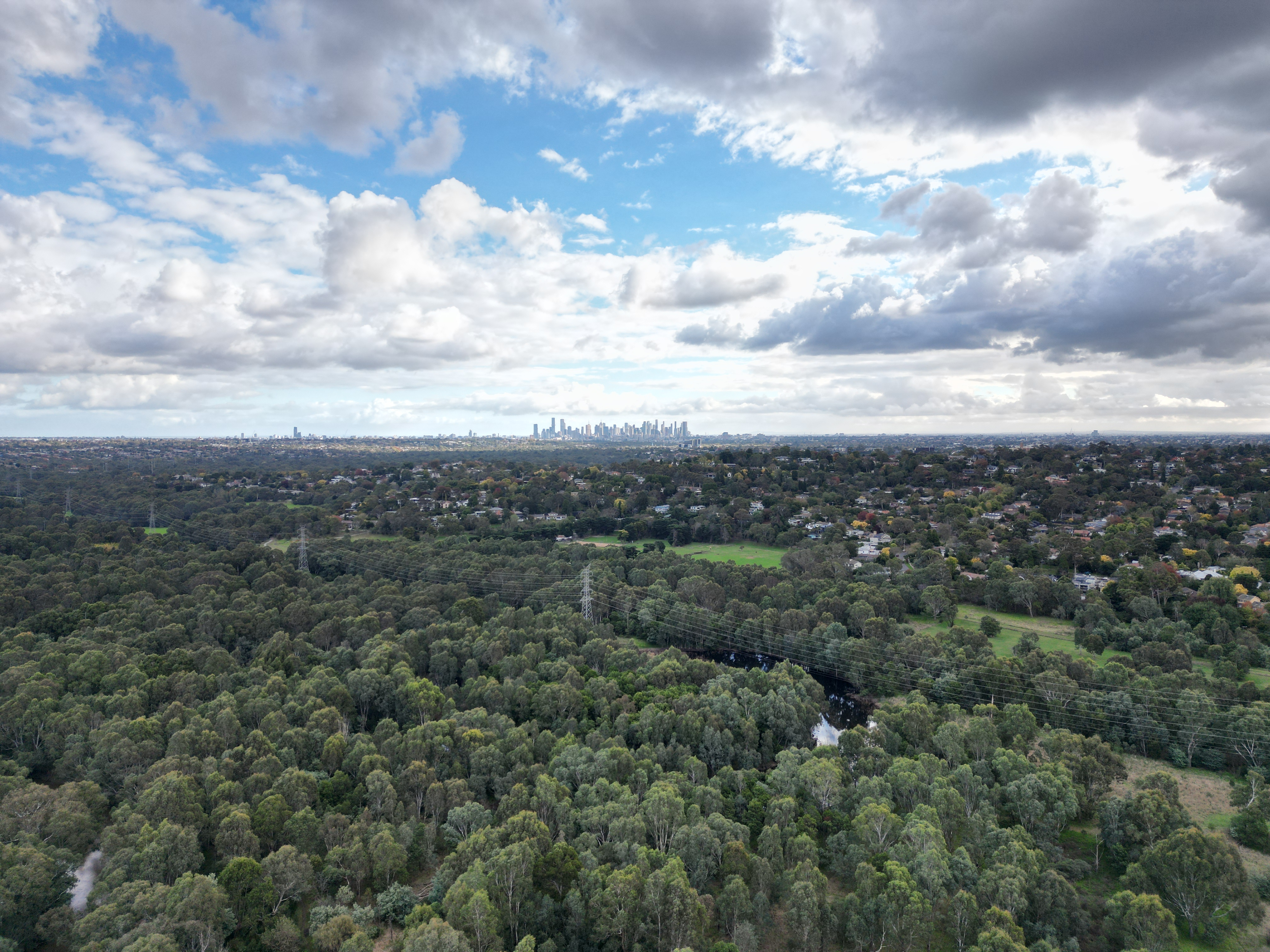
Yarra Flats Park facing the Melbourne skyline. April 2024.

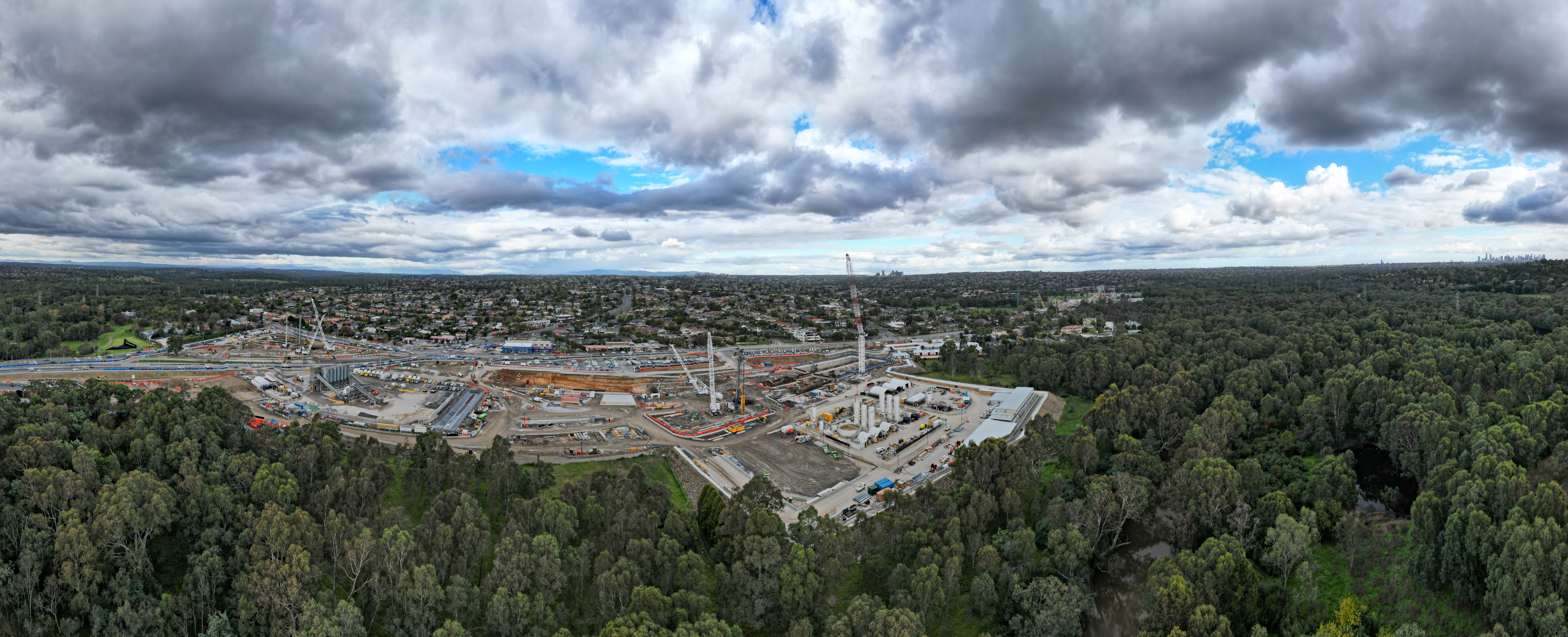
The Northeast Link works around Yarra Flats Park. April 2024.

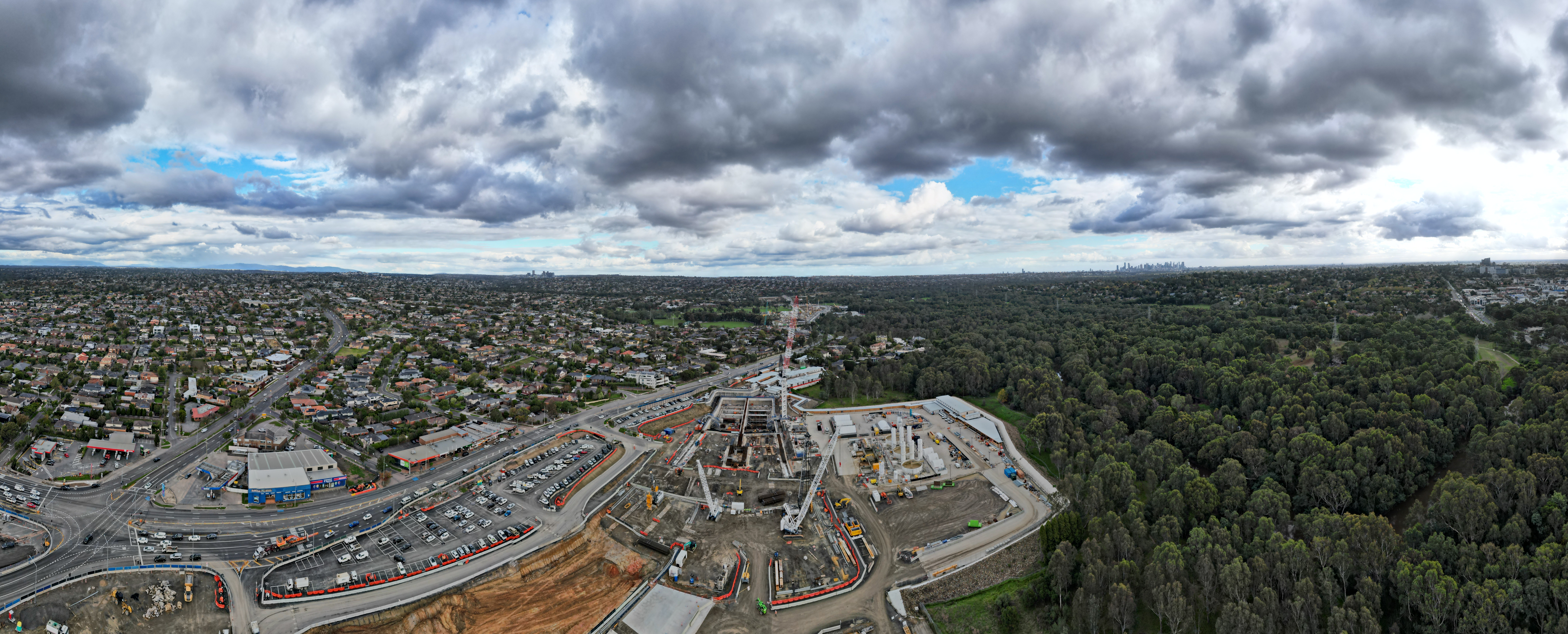
The Yarra Flats, Northeast Link build and the Melbourne skyline. April 2024.

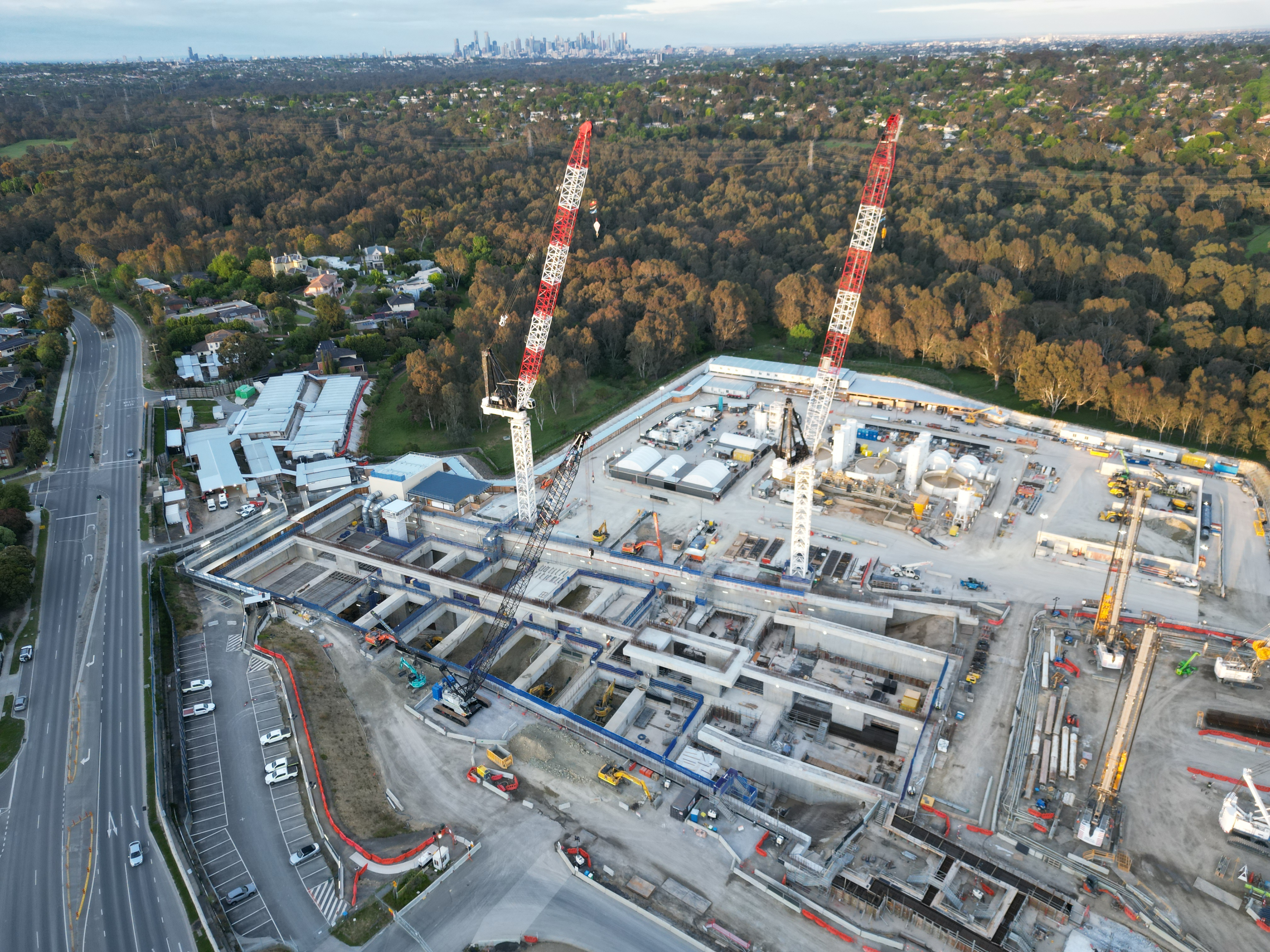
Closeup of the North East Link build in Bulleen

=== Pre-European settlement ===
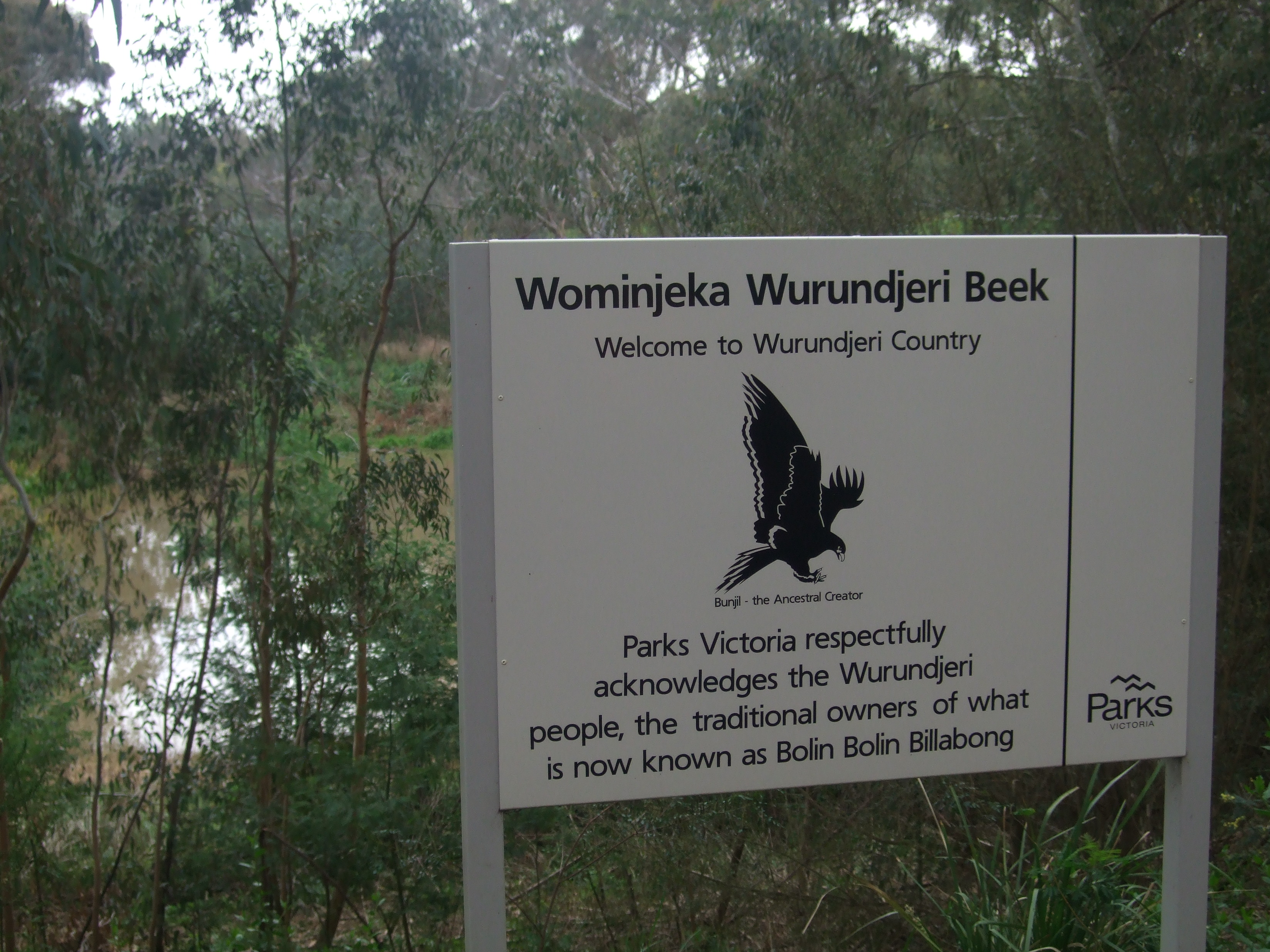
Entrance to the billabong from Bulleen Road

The Bulleen billabongs were an important territory for the Manna Gum people for approximately 5,000 years. Generations had lived on the river flats when wild fish and ducks were abundant. Bolin was the largest lake/billabong in the area and was a significant ritual meeting place for the Aboriginal people, where numerous corroborees were held either by the billabong or on the hills.

=== Post-European settlement ===
In 1841, Frederic Unwin, a Sydney solicitor, purchased 5,120 acres – or eight square miles – of land, including all of the present suburb of Bulleen. The land was purchased from the Crown for one pound an acre under the terms of the short-lived Special Survey regulations. The area was sometimes known as Unwin's Special Survey.

The first Bulleen Post Office opened on 1 April 1952, was renamed Bulleen West in 1960 and closed in 1976. Bulleen South office opened in 1959, was renamed Bulleen in 1960 and again named Bulleen South in 1969 when the current Bulleen office opened.

== Facilities ==
Bulleen Plaza (previously known as Bulleen Village) is the main shopping complex, located on Manningham Road. It includes a library (Bulleen Branch of the Whitehorse Manningham Regional Library), post office, medical centre, business centre, a Coles Supermarket and various specialty shops, cafes.

== Education ==
- St Clement of Rome – A Prep-Grade 6 Catholic primary school.
- Marcellin College – A Catholic secondary school.
- Bulleen Heights School – A school for students with Autism Spectrum Disorder.

Bulleen is home to extensive sporting facilities belonging to the private schools of Carey and Trinity.

== Transport ==
Major roads in Bulleen include:

- Manningham Road (40)
- Thompsons Road (42)
- Bulleen Road (52)
- Templestowe Road (52)
- Eastern Freeway (M3)

Public transport in Bulleen is limited to bus services, many of them running to the Melbourne CBD via dedicated bus lanes on the Eastern Freeway and Hoddle Street. Bus routes in Bulleen are operated by Kinetic Melbourne and operate primarily on main roads, though Templestowe Road in the north of the suburb is a notable exception of proper bus services.

Throughout the 1970s the Doncaster railway line was planned by the State Government to run down the middle of the Eastern Freeway and serve the suburb. Land was acquired for the line but was sold in the 1980s. Various plans have also been made for extension of the tram route 48 north to Doncaster.

== Attractions ==
On Bulleen's northern border is the Yarra River, which adjoins parklands, including Banksia Park with its bike paths and picnic facilities. Adjacent to Banksia Park is the Heide Museum of Modern Art. Other important reserves include the Bulleen Park sporting grounds and approximately in the centre of the suburb, Yarraleen and Morris Williams reserves, which offer an adventure playground and general open space.

To the west of Bulleen Road is the Yarra Flats Park, with bike tracks, walking tracks, picnic tables, shelter, wood barbecues, birdlife, wild berries, billabongs and views of the Yarra River. Yarra Flats Park adjoins Bulleen and Banksia Parks. The Bulleen Park complex has a number of grounds suitable for Australian rules football, cricket and soccer, as well as an archery range and model aeroplane club. The Yarraleen Cricket Club, which plays in the Box Hill Reporter District Cricket Association, is located in the Bulleen Park pavilions at the rear of the complex.

== Sport ==
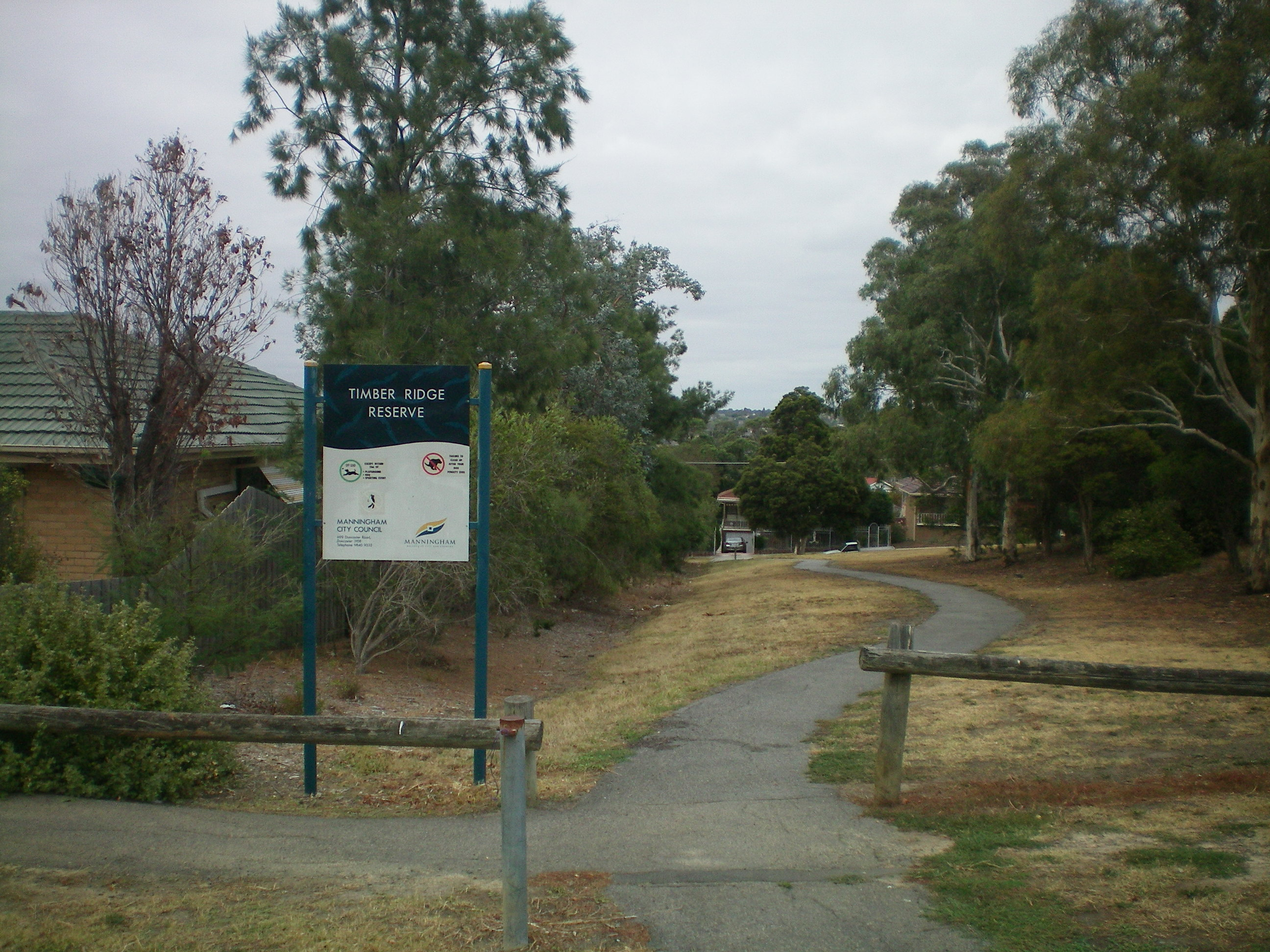
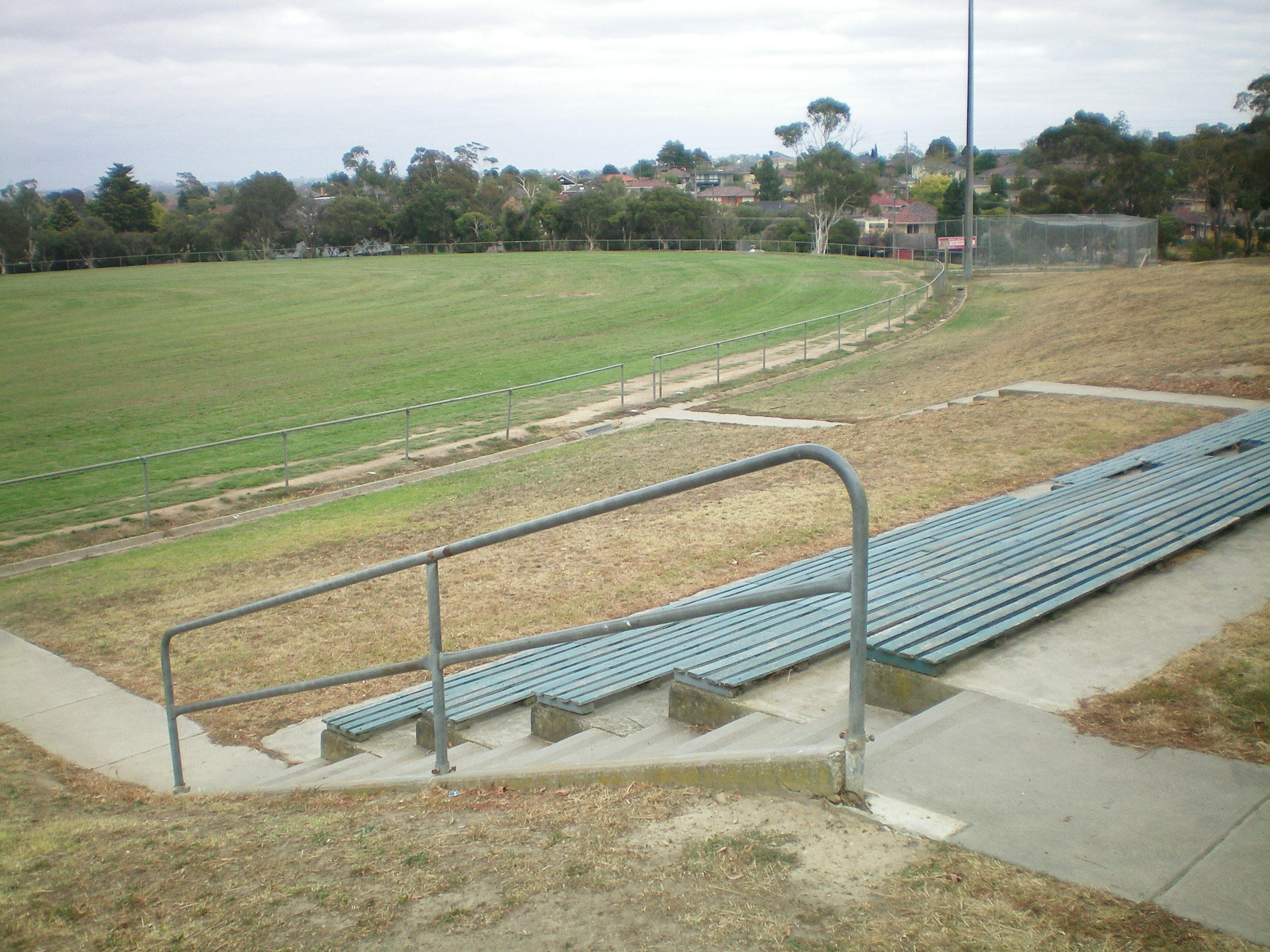
Junior teams play at Timber Ridge Reserve in Doncaster, in close proximity to the Bulleen Templestowe Cricket Club

Ted Ajani Reserve, home of the Bulleen Templestowe Football Club, is located on Thompson Road. The "Bullants" are a proud family club, who had some recent premiership success at senior level (2004, 2008, 2012). The Reserves side were also Premiers in 2012 making it a very successful year for the Club after building upon the success of the Under 19's who were Premiers in 2011. The Club have been moved to the Eastern Football League for the 2025 season

Koonung Park, home of the Bulleen Cricket Club and the Manningham Cobras Football Club, is located just off Thompsons Road, near the Eastern Freeway.

Koonung Park regularly hosts the Dunstan Shield Grand Final, the highest grade of turf cricket in the Eastern Cricket Association.

Golfers play at the course of the Yarra Valley Golf Club, on Templestowe Road.

Other reserves include:

- Sheahans Rd Reserve (basketball, tennis, play)
- Swanston St Reserve (play)
- Bulleen Park (Australian rules football in winter and cricket in summer – Yarraleen CC)

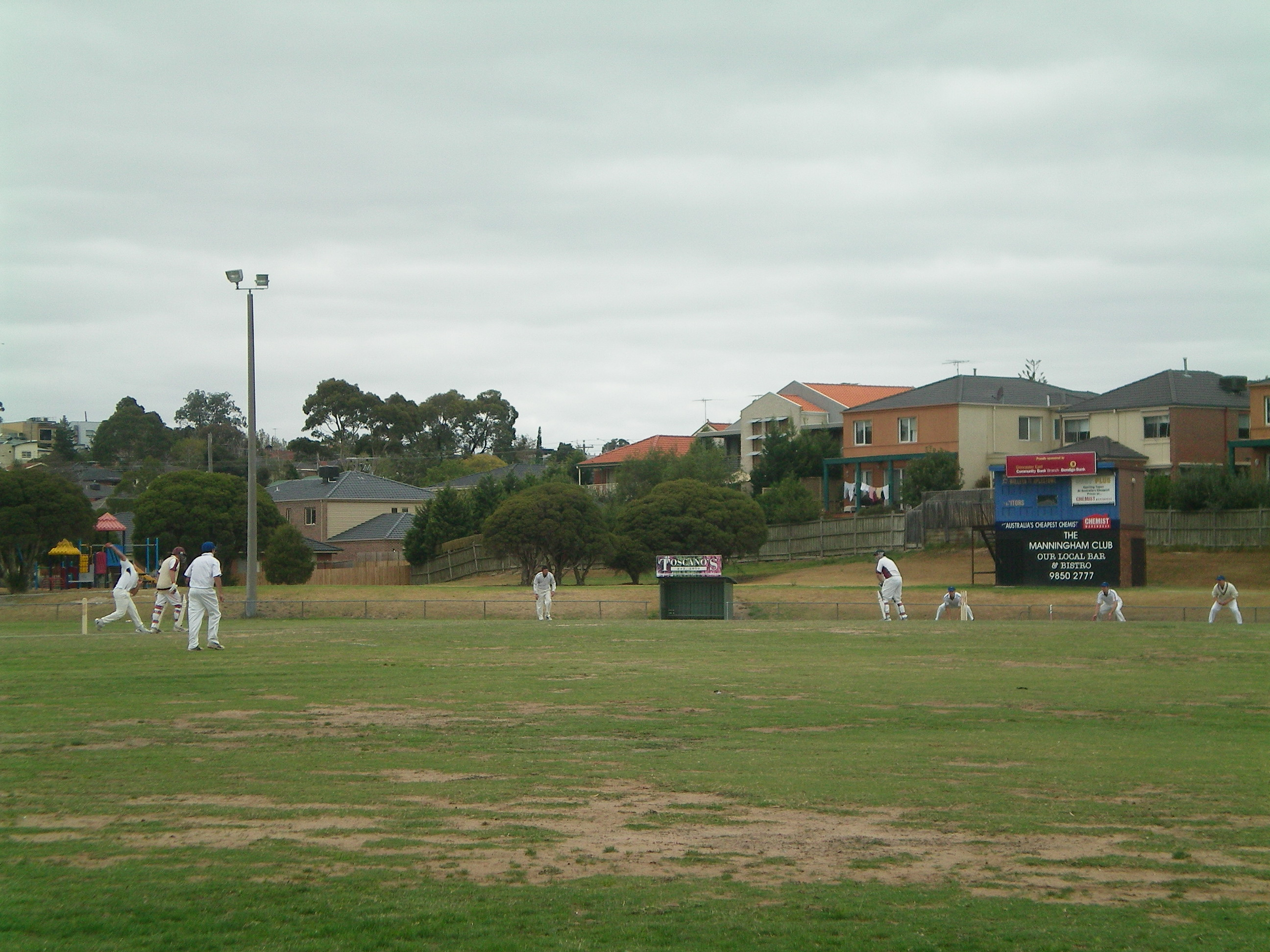
The Bulleen Templestowe Cricket Club playing at Ted Ajani Reserve in Lower Templestowe

The Boorondara Tennis Centre and a swimming centre are located on Bulleen Road and a Golf driving range is located on Templestowe Road.

FC Bulleen Lions play soccer at the Veneto Club and currently compete in the National Premier Leagues of Victoria 2 East.

== Notable residents ==
- Stephen Mayne – Journalist, Councillor for Heide Ward from 2009 to present
- Roseanne Park - member of K-pop group Blackpink

== See also ==
- City of Doncaster and Templestowe – Bulleen was previously within this former local government area.
- Electoral district of Bulleen
