= Dromana =

- Suburb
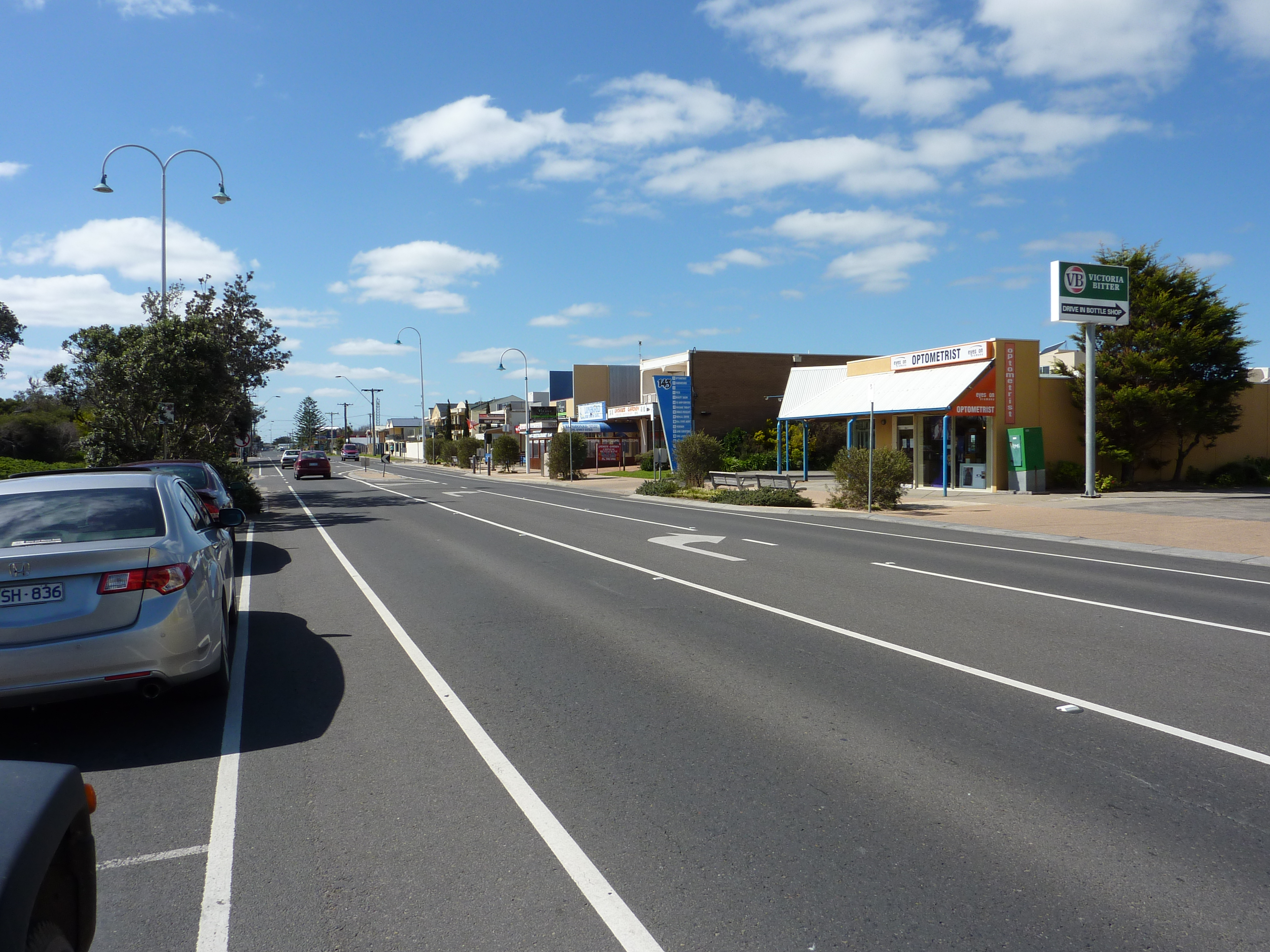
- Point Nepean Road and shops

- Interactive map of Dromana
- Coordinates: 38.338°S 144.965°E
- Country: Australia
- State: Victoria
- City: Melbourne
- LGA: Shire of Mornington Peninsula
- Location: 75 km (47 mi) from Melbourne; 7 km (4.3 mi) from Rosebud

Government
  - State electorate: Nepean
  - Federal division: Flinders

Area
  - Total: 6.2 km^{2} (2.4 sq mi)

Population
  - Total: 6,626 (2021 census)
  - Density: 1,069/km^{2} (2,768/sq mi)
- Postcode: 3936
Suburbs around Dromana
Port Phillip	Safety Beach	Safety Beach
Port Phillip	Dromana	Merricks North
McCrae	Arthurs Seat	Red Hill

Dromana (/drəˈmɑːnə/ drə-MAH-nə) is a seaside suburb on the Mornington Peninsula in Melbourne, Victoria, Australia, 57 km (35 mi) south of Melbourne's Central Business District, located within the Shire of Mornington Peninsula local government area. Dromana recorded a population of 6,626 at the 2021 census.

== Geography ==
Dromana is located in Victoria, south of the capital city, Melbourne, between Safety Beach, Rosebud and Red Hill. It is located west of Merricks Beach and French Island. Overlooking Dromana from the south, Arthurs Seat is the highest point on the Mornington Peninsula.

== History ==
Prior to European colonisation, the area now known as Dromana was known to the Boonwurrung as Kangerrong.

It is believed that the name Dromana is of Irish origin and that it came about from the influx of gold prospectors in the late 1830s. There is a Dromana (Irish: Drom Eanaigh) on the tidal section of the River Blackwater, near Cappoquin, County Waterford in Ireland, and this is the most likely origin of the name.

In 1841, Hugh Jamieson purchased 5,120 acres (2,070 ha), or eight square miles, of land from the Crown for £1 an acre under the terms of the short-lived Special Survey regulations. The purchase included the northern part of the present suburb of Dromana to the east of Safety Beach. The area is known as Jamieson's Special Survey in cadastral surveys.

The first subdivision of Crown lands in Dromana occurred in 1854. Dromana Post Office opened on 12 April 1858. The completion of its pier took place in 1872, allowing the shipping of produce to the city markets. In 1881, Dromana was well established as a seaside resort.

A travel brochure of the time describes it as follows: "Sheltered from the untempered violence of the elements by the lofty ranges by which it is encircled, Dromana presents an air of homely comfort, singularly foreign to the majority of watering places." Dromana was proclaimed a town in February 1861.

A major contributor to the development of Dromana was Spencer Jackson. One of his greatest achievements was the facilitation of the construction of a road to the summit of Arthurs Seat in 1929. Dromana's pier was much longer in those days and Dromana shared with Sorrento the ability to accommodate the bay steamers which did much to promote Dromana as a tourist destination. The McKeown and Shaw families ran guest houses for over half a century.

One of the oldest buildings that remains is the Dromana Hotel, established in 1862 by Richard Watkin, but it was a much more beautiful building before Lou Carrigg commissioned Howard Lawson to remodel the facade in 1934. There was a racecourse behind the hotel for years, as well as one near the site of the Dromana Secondary College. The Arthurs Seat Hotel, which stood on the west corner of Esplanade and Permien St was destroyed by a fire in 1898.

Much of the early work in the area involved cutting, sawing and dressing timber from Arthurs Seat for the construction of piers around the bay and at Flinders. Farmers were involved with this livelihood and were carting the wood on Bullock drays to Captain Peter Pidoto's Little Angelina to Sheepwash Creek. Many of the grantees of land around the township were at first tenants on Jamieson's Special Survey. (Sources as above plus Rosebud;Flower of the Peninsula.)

Dromana's commercial centre is concentrated on Point Nepean Road, with Arthurs Seat and surrounding bushland providing a scenic backdrop. Across the road is an attractive foreshore with calm, sandy beaches, including designated camping areas. It is also home to the D.A. Christie Public Barbecue, which started manufacture in the Dromana Industrial Estate in 1974. Points of interest along the coast include the Dromana Pier, the rocky cutting at Anthonys Nose and the Mornington Peninsula Visitor Information Centre.

=== Heritage listings ===
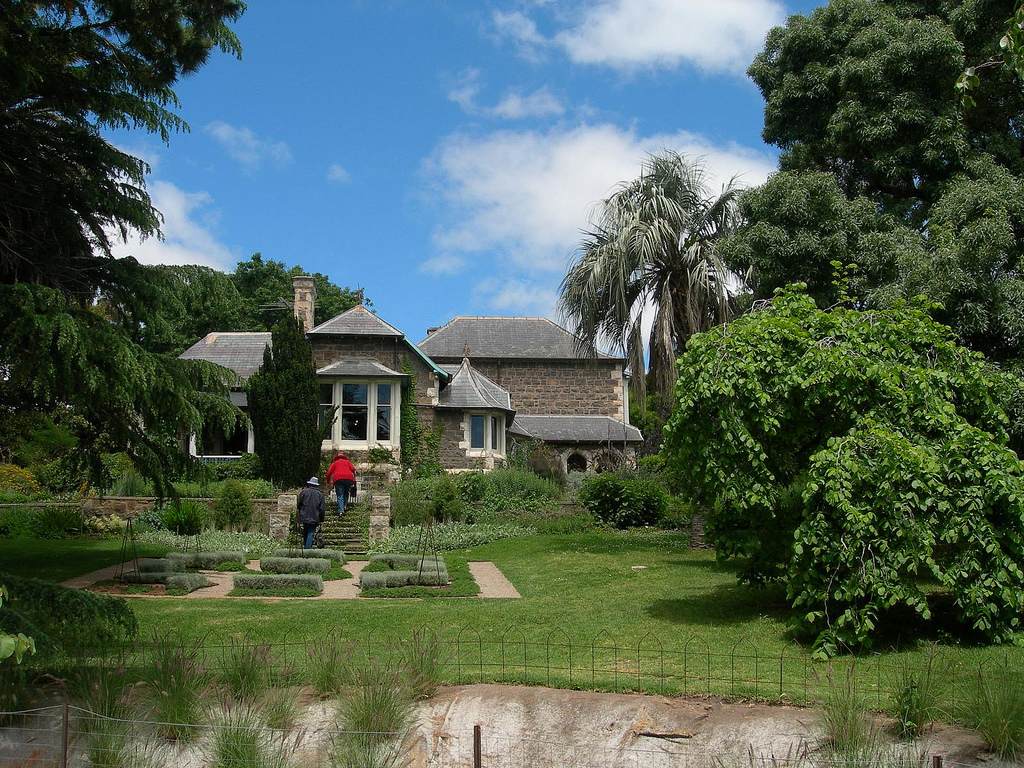
Heronswood, in 2008

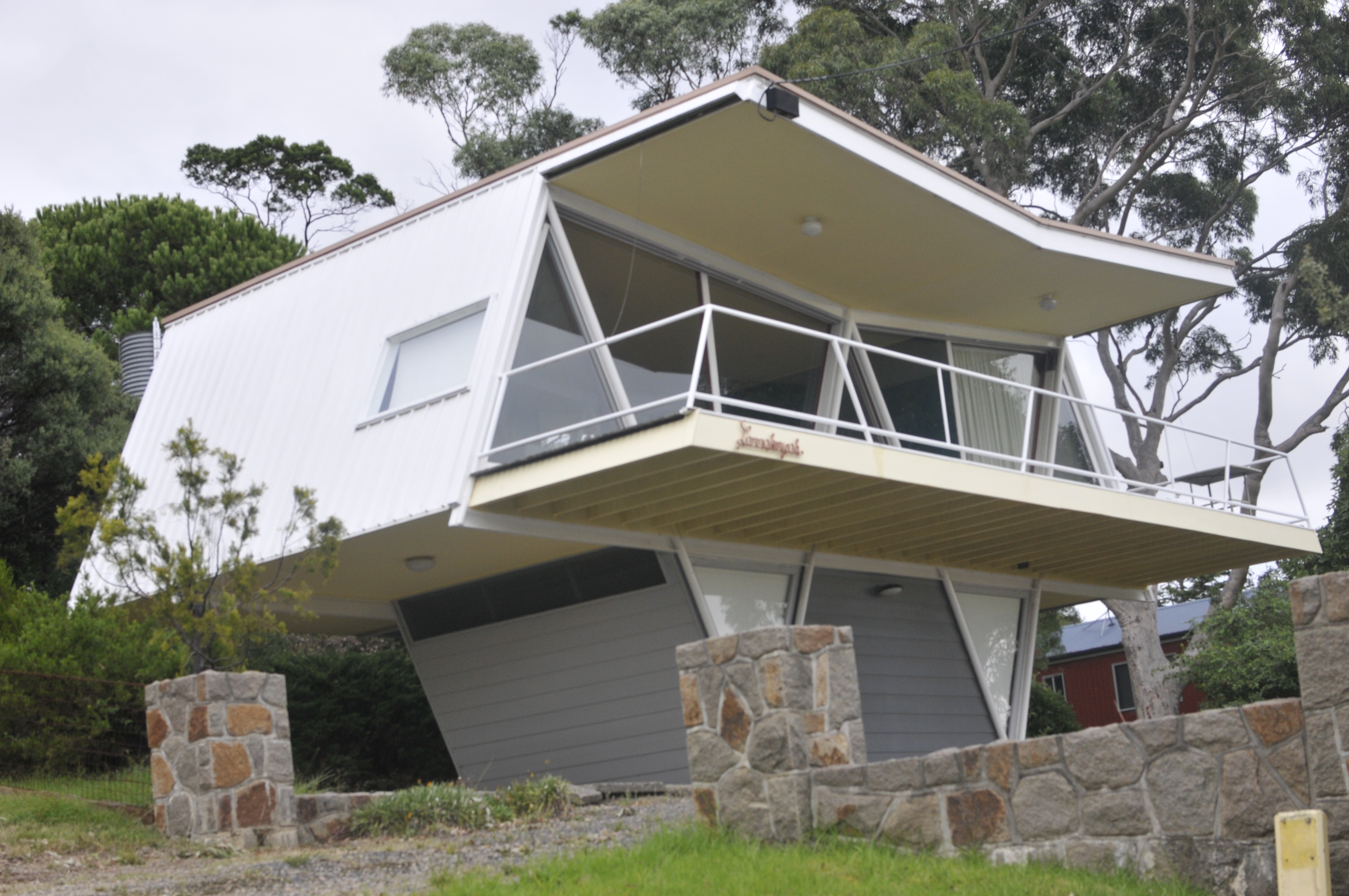
McCraith House, in 2012

The following places in Dromana are listed on the Victorian Heritage Register:

- Dromana Drive-In, 133 Nepean Highway
- Heronswood, 105 Latrobe Parade
- McCraith House, 1 Atunga Terrace

== Present day ==
Dromana is known for its number of vineyards. More than 22 separate vintners operate within Dromana, as well as several vineyards. The Dromana 3 Drive-In cinema is a popular entertainment spot for locals and holidaymakers alike.

Overlooking Dromana from the south Arthurs Seat, is the highest point on the Mornington Peninsula offering panoramic views of Port Phillip, Safety Beach, Mount Martha, Rosebud and Portsea.

Dromana's retail environment is mostly restaurants and take away food shops, present on the main strip is also a drive through bottle shop, it also has a small shopping centre that contains Bakers Delight, Ritchies IGA, café, pharmacy, newsagent and a liquor store.

The town has an Australian Rules football team competing in the Mornington Peninsula Nepean Football League.

== Schools ==
- Dromana Primary School
- Dromana Secondary College (Formerly Dromana Technical College)
- Dromana Special School

== Notable people ==
- Bridie Kennedy

== See also ==
- Shire of Flinders – Dromana was previously within this former local government area.
