= Jamieson's Special Survey =

In 1841, Hugh Jamieson purchased 5,120 acres (2,070 ha), or eight square miles, of land near Dromana on the Mornington Peninsula approximately 60 km south of Melbourne, Victoria, Australia. The land was purchased from the Crown for one pound an acre under the terms of the short-lived Special Survey regulations.

The land was leased and sublet in small lots and eventually became part of the Mount Martha sheep station.

Jamieson's Special Survey is bounded by the line Ellerina Road/Bruce Road/Foxeys Road to the north, the line of Point Nepean Road/Dunns Creek Road to the south, Port Phillip Bay near Safety Beach to the west and the line of Bulldog Creek Road to the east. It covers the entire suburb of Safety Beach and the part of Dromana north of the line of Point Nepean Road/Dunns Creek Road.

The name is used as a locality in historical and cadastral surveys and title documents.
