= Unwin's Special Survey =

Fredrick Unwin's survey of land he purchased in Melbourne, Victoria, Australia

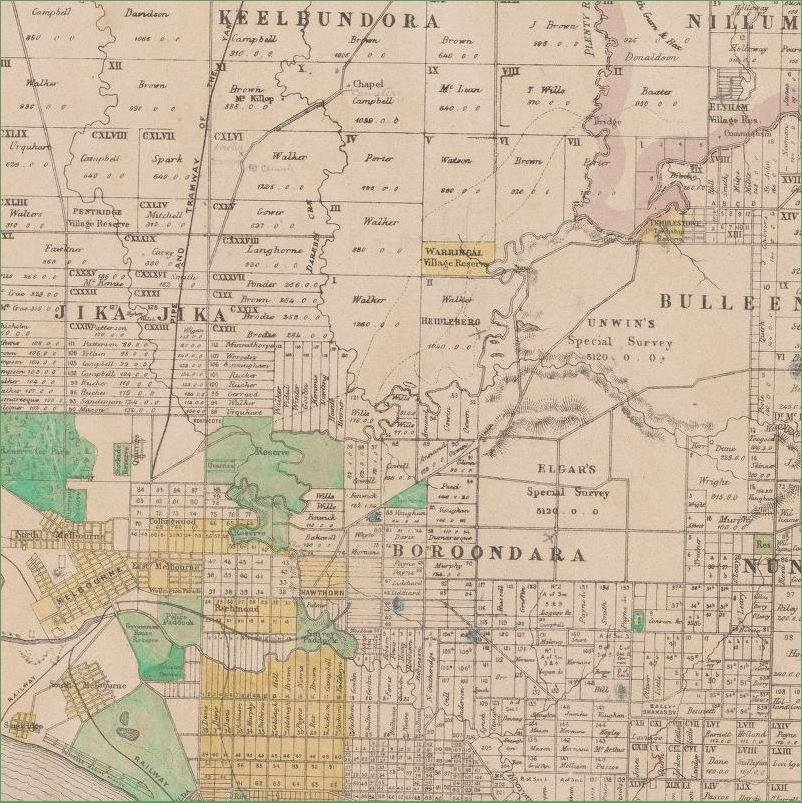
Portion of 1866 map of County of Bourke showing Elgar's and Unwin's Special Survey

In 1841, Frederic Wright Unwin, a Sydney solicitor, purchased 5,120 acres or eight square miles of land approximately 10 km north-east of Melbourne, Victoria, Australia. The land was purchased from the Crown for one pound an acre under the terms of the short-lived Special Survey regulations.

Unwin's Special Survey covered the area now bounded by the Yarra River (west), Koonung Creek (south), Church Rd (east) and Templestowe Road/Foote St/Reynolds Rd (north). It includes all of the Melbourne suburb of Bulleen, most of Templestowe Lower and Doncaster and the parts of Templestowe
