= Dendy's Special Survey =

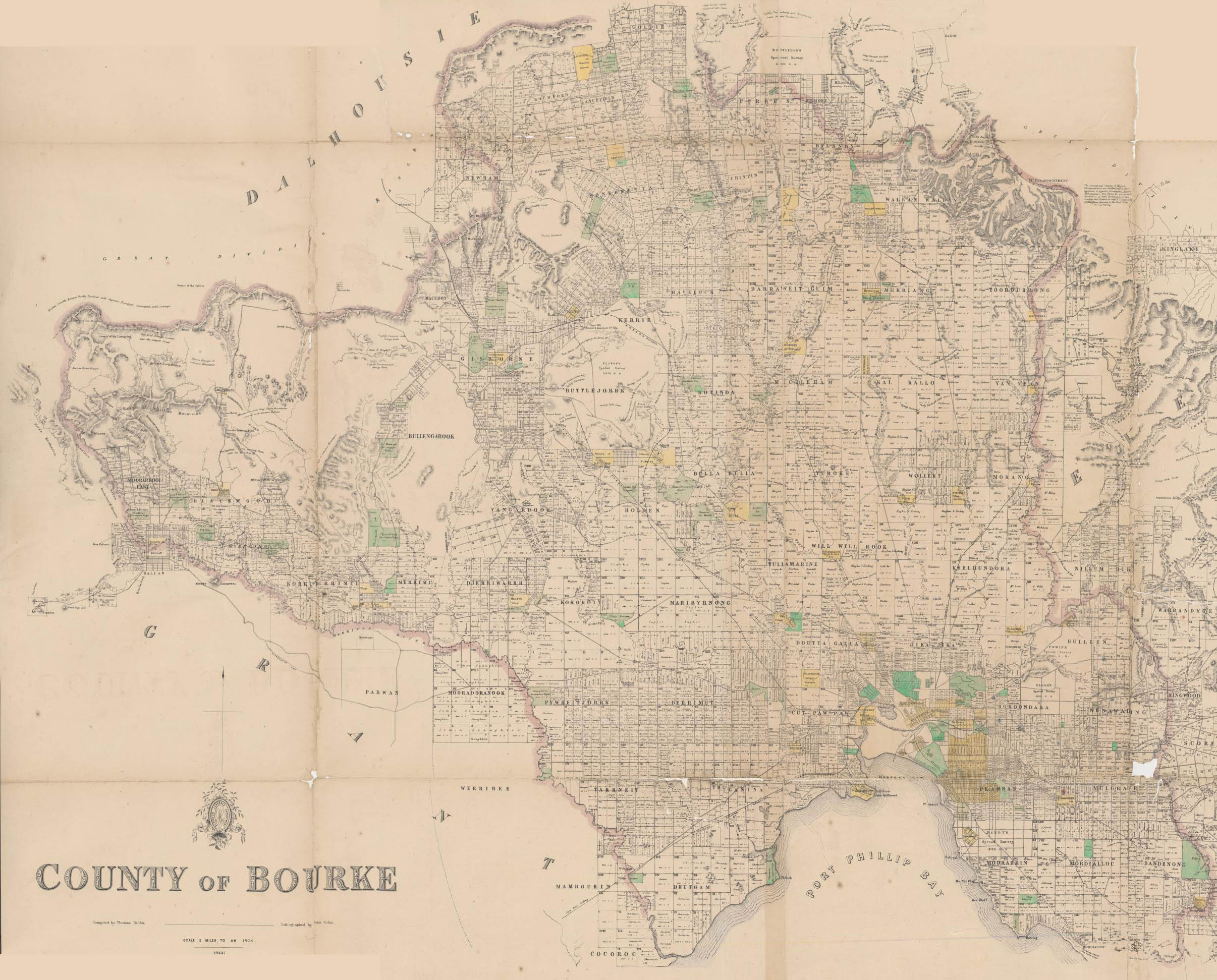
1866 map of County of Bourke. Dendy's Special Survey is south-east of Melbourne on the coast.

Dendy's Special Survey formed the basis for the settlement of Brighton. It covered the area now bounded by North Road; South Road; on the west by the Port Phillip Bay; and on the east by East Boundary Road. It includes: all of the Melbourne suburbs of Bentleigh, Brighton East, Ormond; and parts of Brighton, Bentleigh East and McKinnon.

The Special Survey regulations determined that the land should:

- be at least five miles (8 km) from Melbourne: North Road runs east–west on the survey Section line five miles (8 km) south of Batman's Hill
- have no more than two miles (3 km) of water-frontage: South Road runs east–west two miles (3 km) south of North Road
- have an area of eight square miles: so East Boundary Road runs north–south four miles (6 km) from the coast

As the alignment of East Boundary Road is determined by the coastline, it does not lie on a survey Section line and therefore isn't aligned with the Melbourne one-mile (1.6 km) survey grid.
