= Port Phillip District Special Surveys =

In August 1840, the Colonial Land and Emigration Commissioners of the British Government decided to allow the purchase of land anywhere in the Port Phillip District of New South Wales (now in Victoria), Australia. Special Surveys could be requested to enable the purchase of 5,120 acres (2,070 ha), or eight square miles, for £1 per acre. This price was significantly below the value of the land at that time.

To restrict the sale of valuable land, Governor Gipps introduced regulations in March 1841 that required the land to be more than 5 miles (8.0 km) from a surveyed township, and to restrict the water-frontage to one mile (1.6 km) per four square miles of area.

Eight special surveys were advertised in June 1841:

1. Frederic Unwin's survey at Templestowe, near Melbourne
2. Henry Dendy's survey at Brighton, near Melbourne
3. William Rutledge's survey at Kilmore
4. John Orr's survey near the Albert River, near Corner Inlet
5. William Rutledge's survey near the Albert River, near Corner Inlet
6. Hugh Jamieson's survey between Mount Martha and Arthur's Seat on the Mornington Peninsula.
7. Henry Elgar's survey at Box Hill and Balwyn, near Melbourne
8. John Reeve's survey on the Tarra River, near Corner Inlet

A survey for James Atkinson for 5,120 acres (2,070 ha) near Port Fairy was advertised in 1843. This survey had been delayed by disputes over the boundaries.

Rutledge did not take up the Port Albert survey. In its place he purchased land near the present Koroit in western Victoria.

Originally the five mile (8 km) distance from Melbourne was taken from the declared outer boundary of Melbourne, Hoddle Street. This was later amended to the distance from the centre of Melbourne, apparently taken as the intersection of Bourke Street and Elizabeth Street. As a consequence, Unwin and Elgar were granted land nearer to the city. The original location of the special surveys are shown in maps of Port Phillip District by Russell and Hoddle, drawn in 1841.

The regulation was rescinded in August 1841.

The Unwin's, Dendy's and especially Elgar's Special Surveys have had a lasting effect on the alignment of Melbourne subdivisions and roads as some boundaries did not conform to the one mile (1.6 km) interval survey Section lines running north–south and east–west referenced from the survey datum at Batman's Hill.

== Notes ==
1. According to The Sydney Gazette of 24 June 1841, Those gentleman who have been fortunate enough to obtain special surveys in our province, have had ample reason to be thankful. Mr. Rutledge has disposed of one acre of his special survey on the Sydney road (which cost him £1) for £100, and he has refused an offer of £2 per acre for the whole. Mr. Elgar, who holds another special survey near the Yarra Yarra, about 7 miles from Melbourne, has refused £8 an acre for one hundred acres. Mr. Unwin of Sydney is asking £30 an acre for his selection, and has been made a very liberal offer for the whole. Mr. Jamieson, who took his special survey on the margin of our magnificent bay near Mount Barker, has been offered a handsome price for a large portion of his estate. Verily the time for speculating in land has not yet gone by.
2. Further information can be found in the books by Shaw, Bate, and Lay.
