= Gordon Barnard Reserve =

Park in Melbourne, Australia

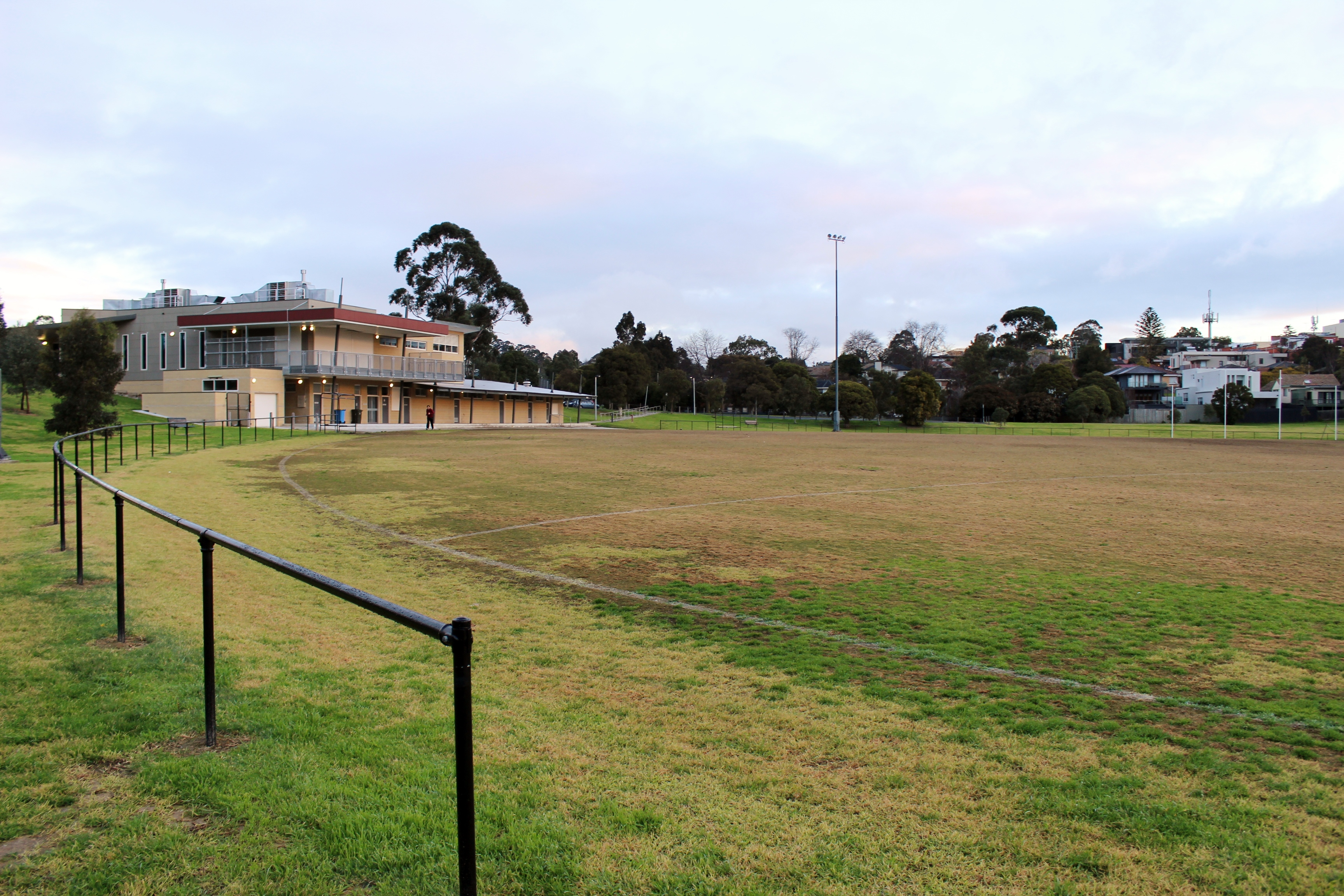
- Sports pavilion looking south
- Interactive map of Gordon Barnard Reserve
- Location: Melbourne, Australia
- Coordinates: 37.801114°S 145.085308°E
- Operator: City of Boroondara
- Terrain: Open ovals surrounded by vegetation
- Vegetation: Australian Native
- Public transit: Bus route 285
- Facilities: Playground, sports pavilion, leisure centre

Gordon Barnard Reserve is a park in the suburb of Balwyn North, Melbourne, Victoria, Australia. It is primarily used for sporting purposes on its two ovals but also contains a significant amount of native vegetation and gravel paths.

== History ==
The site of the reserve was originally part of the creekbed for Glass Creek, being situated in a valley. It then became the municipal rubbish tip for the former City of Camberwell in the 1950s as the area rapidly developed. The Northern Pool, now Boroondara Sports Complex, was built in 1962 at the southern end of the area adjacent to Belmore Road. The date for the closing of the tip and its conversion to the present-day reserve is unknown.

The reserve is named for a former curator of the City of Camberwell, Gordon Barnard.

== Access ==
Cars may access the reserve through a small carpark off Balwyn Road in the west or a larger carpark adjacent to the sports pavilion and Boroondara Sports Complex in the south. Street parking is also available on Tuxen and Tovey Streets to the north. There is no through access between carparks for vehicles. Balwyn Road features the 285 bus service with a stop directly servicing the reserve near the Balwyn Leisure Centre building. The park is also indirectly accessible from Belmore Road bus routes 302 and 304.

There is an extensive network of gravel and sealed paths throughout the park connecting various points inside the reserve. A primary circuit path follows the boundaries of most ovals which is suitable for walking, jogging or cycling. Paths also run through to Jacka Street Reserve in the east, Belmore Road to the south and Tovey Street to the north. Hislop Park is also accessible across Balwyn Road.

== Sporting clubs ==
The following sporting clubs use the park:

- Balwyn Cricket Club
- Old Camberwell Grammarians Football Club
- Greythorn Football Club
- Canterbury Junior Football Club

== See also ==
- Hislop Park
- Macleay Park
- Balwyn North
