= Riverside Estate, Victoria =

Riverside Estate Melbourne, Victoria
- Coordinates: 37°47′37″S 145°5′11″E
- Established: 1938; 87 years ago
- Postcode(s): 3104
- Location: 11 km (7 mi) from Melbourne
- LGA(s): City of Boroondara

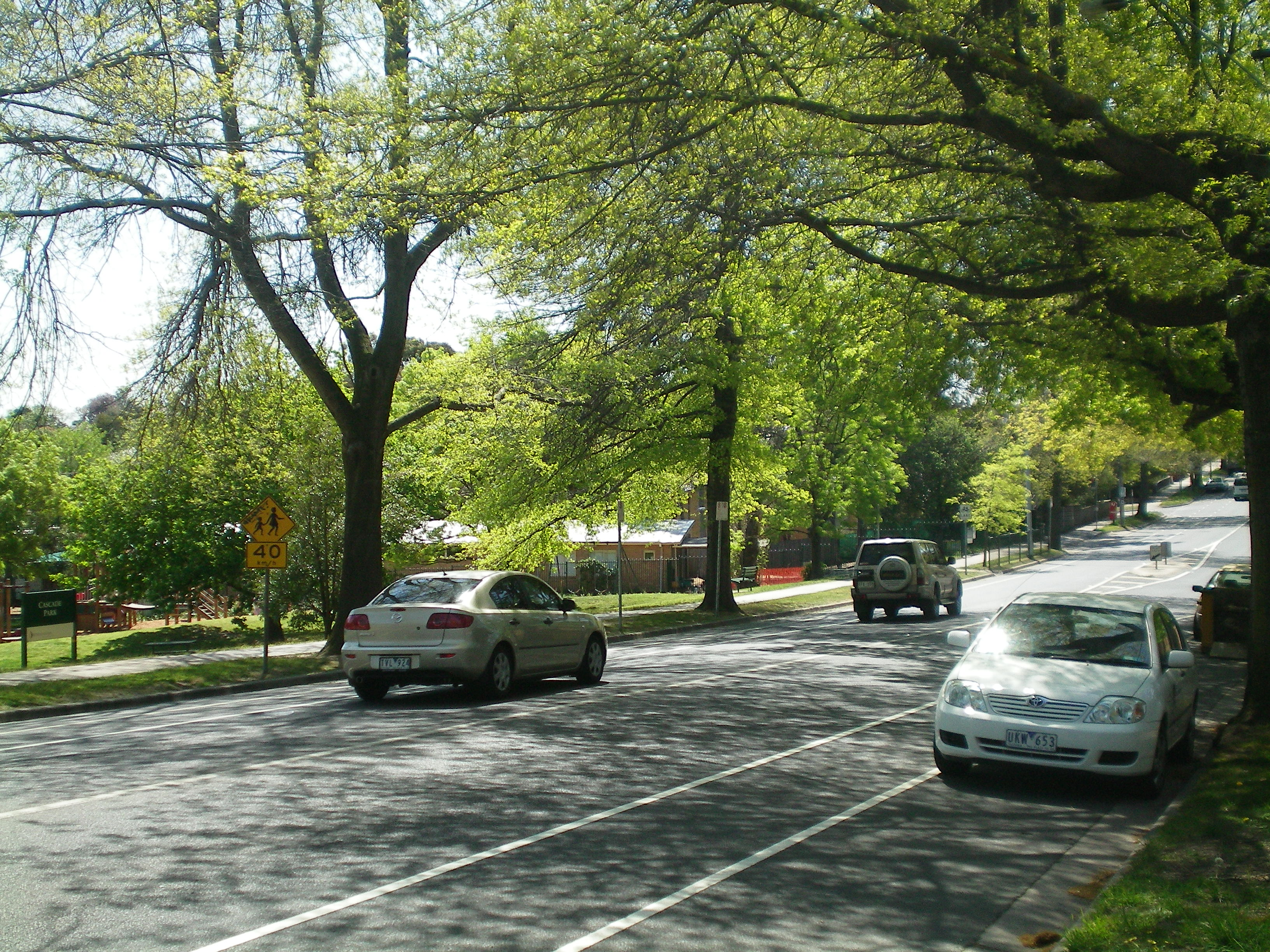
Leafy green trees provide a canopy over Bulleen Road, with Bellevue Kindergarten in the background. October 2008.

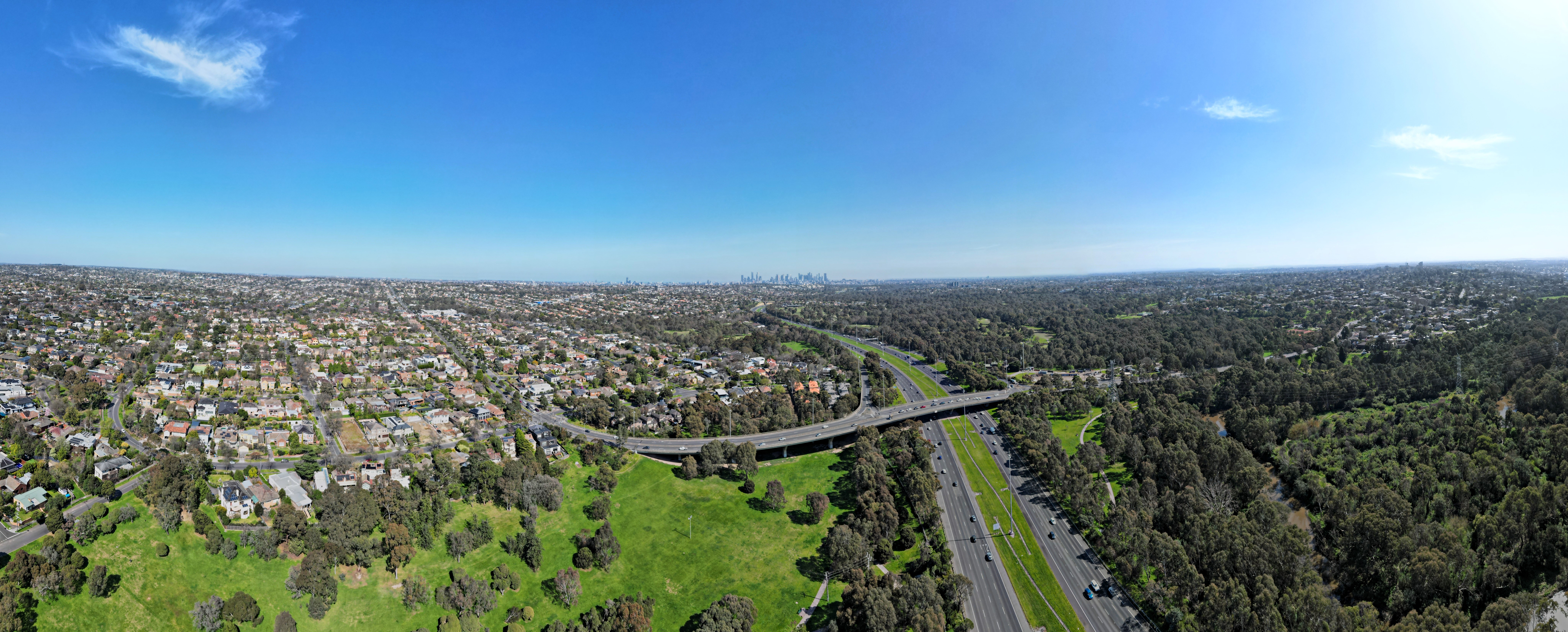
Aerial panorama of the Eastern Freeway section in Balwyn North facing the city skyline, with the Riverside Estate on the left. September 2023.

Riverside Estate is a residential area of Melbourne located in the north western corner of Balwyn North, 11km north-east of the Melbourne CBD. Established in 1938, the area is bordered by Burke Road to the west, the Eastern Freeway to the north, Doncaster Road to the south, and Bulleen Road to the east.

Famed for its leafy green streets and for its interwar art deco architecture, the estate is one of the most well known neighbourhoods within the City of Boroondara, with its entirety being recognized by the Victorian Heritage Register.

== History ==
The estate comes into note in early 1938, when an advertisement of an auction for 41 lots of subdivided blocks of land appeared in an unstated newspaper. The suburb of the estate was then 'Camberwell North', which fell under the local government area of City of Camberwell. The first lots to be sold within the subdivision were auctioned on February 12th. Later that year in December, the neighbourhood was connected by tram with the still operating 48 route being established, and commencing operations from Doncaster road.

Today, following the amalgamation of the Cities of Kew, Camberwell and Hawthorn, the neighbourhood is within the administration of the local government of Boroondara, falling under the council ward of 'Bellevue'. Following multiple seat changes over decades, the neighbourhood's state electorate now falls under the seat Kew, with the federal electorate seat being Kooyong.

== Parks ==
The neighbourhood has three parks & reserves, being Cascade Park, Corona Reserve, and the largest, Musca Street Reserve. The Musca Street Reserve parkland is shared with the neighbouring suburb of Kew East, with the Burke Road bridge above the Eastern freeway being situated over the reserve. The reserve is most known for being the western end of the Koonung Creek Trail commences, connecting to the neighbouring linear park of Koonung Creek Reserve, which is also in Balwyn North, but in the bordering Panoramic estate. The parkland was used as an administrative site during the construction of the North East Link.

== Public transport ==
The area is serviced by both a tram line and three bus routes, along with being a regularly mentioned suitable location for a train station to be built along the long-proposed proposed Doncaster railway line.

The neighbourhood's tram line is the 48 route, being stops 45 & 46 along Doncaster Road. This section of the line was part of the original section that was built when the line commenced service on 11 December 1938, shortly after the estate's establishment. Along the tram on Doncaster road, the area is serviced by the 200 & 207 bus routes, and also has the 548 route operating via Burke road.
