= Greythorn Park =

Park in Balwyn North, Australia

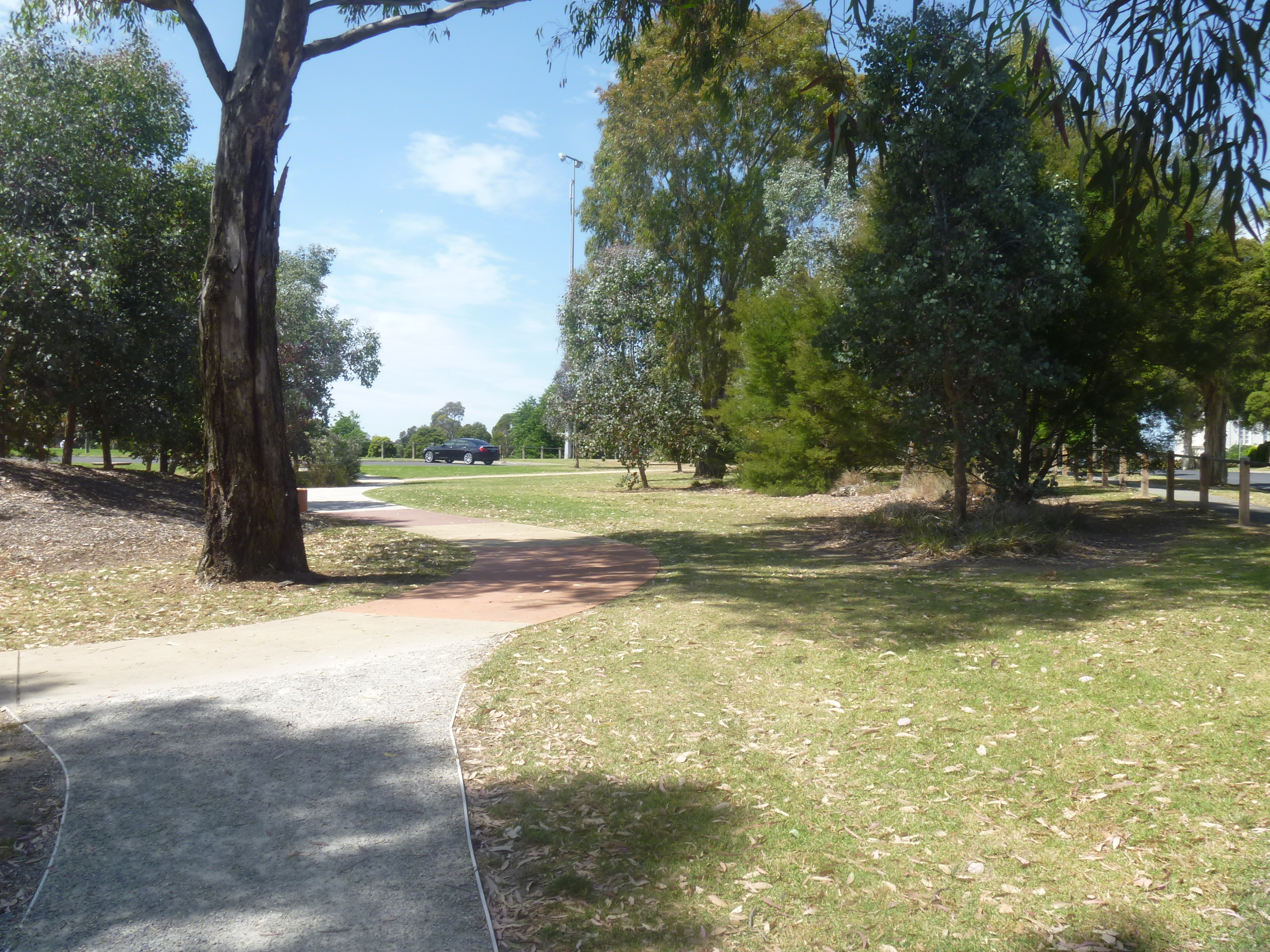
- The south-western entrance to the park off Robert Street
- Interactive map of Greythorn Park
- Location: Melbourne, Australia
- Coordinates: 37.797966°S 145.094138°E
- Area: 6.34 hectares (15.7 acres)
- Opened: 1951
- Operator: City of Boroondara
- Paths: Mix of formal and informal pathways
- Terrain: Green open space interspersed with vegetation
- Water: Small unnamed pond
- Vegetation: Australian Native
- Facilities: Playground, 2 sports pavilions, tennis courts, scout hall, Barbecues, toilets

Greythorn Park is a park in the suburb of Balwyn North, Melbourne, Victoria, Australia. It is located in the eastern part of the suburb known as Greythorn, from which the park gets its name.

== History ==
The land where Greythorn Park currently is situated was owned by the Maughan family from 1838, when the area was thinly settled and largely bushland. When electric trams first began reaching the area, most notably the tram to Burke Road Kew in 1938 (present day route 48), it encouraged further subdivision of the area. By this time, the area was known as 'Whitethorn', which was later changed to 'Greythorn' to avoid confusion with Whitehorse Road.

In 1938, with the tram now extended to Balwyn Road, the North Balwyn Wildlife Sanctuary was opened on the present-day side of the park. Operated by the Maughan family, the facility contained Australian native animals, and played host to many American serviceman who were stationed in Melbourne during the Second World War in the 1940s. The sanctuary closed in 1954, but not before most of the land was bequeathed to the City of Camberwell for a recreational park in 1951. The remainder of the land was subdivided into 62 blocks, and the legacy of the sanctuary survives through street names such as 'Wildlife Parade'.

The tennis courts at the Greythorn Tennis Club opened in 1968 and the scout hall was constructed in 1976.

Recently, in collaboration with the Friends of Greythorn Park and the local council, the City of Boroondara, two signs were erected in the middle of the park, close to the Playground and 1st Greythorn Park Scout Hall. These signs display information regarding the history of Greythorn Park and the surrounding area.

== Landscape ==
The park is located on top of a large hill, with an elevation of 91.2m above sea level. The park consists of two main open spaces. The western oval is used by various sporting clubs over summer and winter, with the eastern oval being allocated for passive recreation. A sports pavilion is situation between the two spaces, with a scout hall and tennis club pavilion also situated nearby. A small artificial creek is located near the centre of the park, next to a children's playground.

== Access ==
No public transport directly services the site, but the park is a short walk from the 48 tram terminus on Balwyn Road and from bus route 284 operating along Greythorn Road to the east. Two carparks are located within the park. One is access via Robert Street and the other off Alpha Street. A number of informal walking tracks also circle the park.

== Clubs and groups ==
A number of sporting clubs and other community organisations utilise the park:

- 1st Greythorn Park Scouts
- Greythorn Park Tennis Club
- Kew Rovers Football Club
- Koonung Heights Cricket Club
- North Balwyn Combined Cricket Club

The Friends of Greythorn Park, formerly the Greythorn Park Advisory Committee, are also present at the site, and help to maintain the park with the assistance of local residents.

== See also ==
- Hislop Park
- Macleay Park
- Balwyn North
