= Macleay Park =

Multi-sports complex in Balwyn North, Victoria

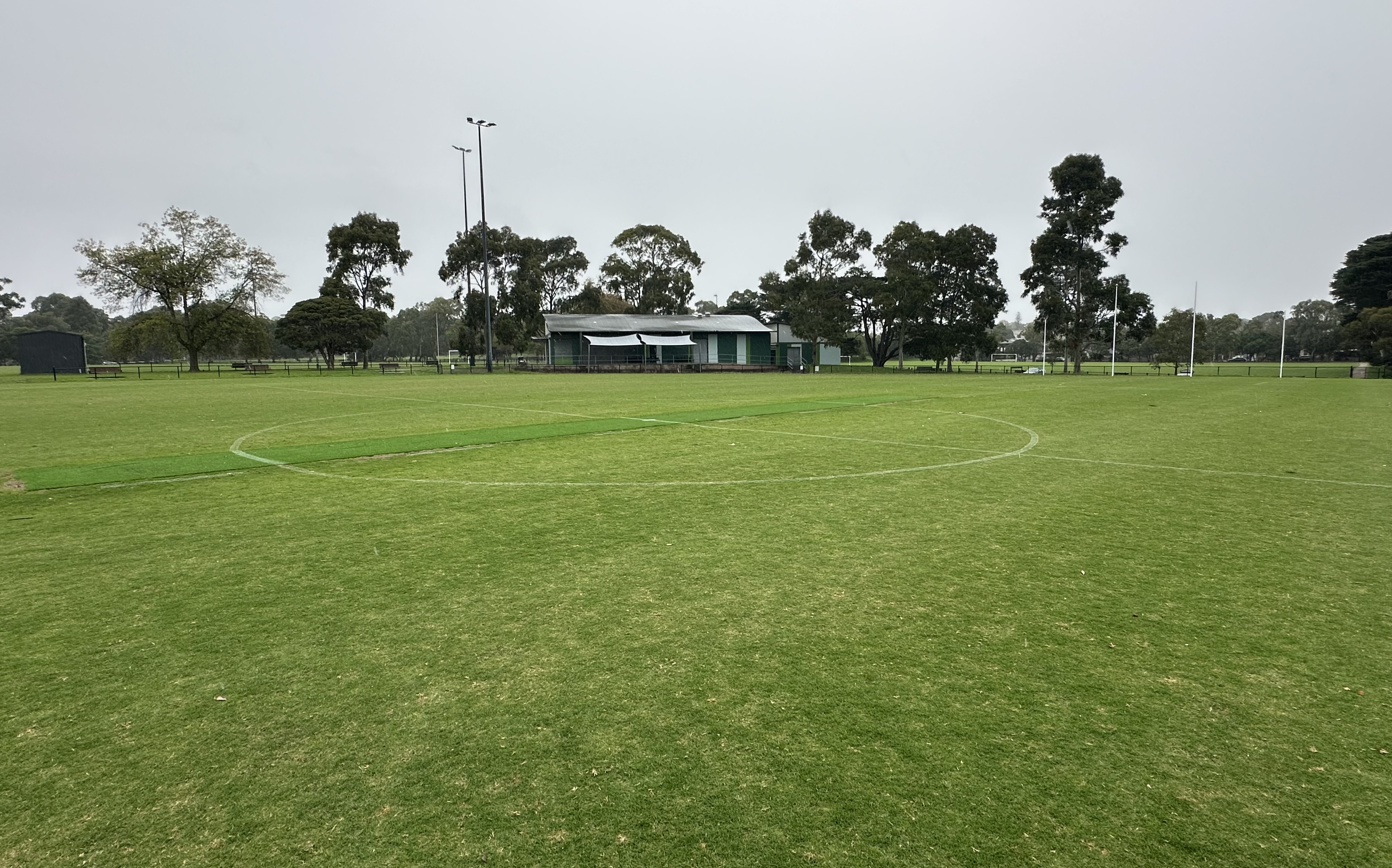
- View of Macleay Park from Oval 2 in 2026
- Interactive map of Macleay Park
- Location: Balwyn North, Victoria
- Coordinates: 37.79979832755992°S 145.0729882017467°E
- Owner: City of Boroondara

Macleay Park is a multi-sports complex in the Melbourne suburb of Balwyn North. It hosts Australian rules football, cricket, soccer, baseball and netball matches. The name also refers to the wider public park in which the sporting grounds are located, while the western half of the venue is also referred to as Myrtle Park.

== History ==
In 1923, the Camberwell City Council acquired the land on which the park stands today. In its early years, the parkland was known as Myrtle Park. The North Balwyn Cricket Club was established in 1927, followed by the North Balwyn Baseball Club in 1937.

During the post-war housing boom in Melbourne during the 1950s, the park became increasingly used by the increase in population, including by travelling circuses, and the original sporting pavilion was opened in 1962 and rebuilt in 2007.

It is situated between Severn St and Buchanan Avenue in a portion of a valley through which the Glass Creek runs, now largely through underground drains.

== Access ==
Cars enter the park from one of two separate entrances, either from Belmore Road directly or from Gildan Street. There is no through access between the carparks. Belmore Road features frequent bus services, with both the 302 and 304 routes servicing the park at two stops. A path, crossing Buchanan Avenue to the east, links Macleay Park with Hislop Park through the North Balwyn Tennis Club. There is also pedestrian access from Severn Street in the west, Balwyn High School and Cobham Street to the north, Buchanan Avenue in the east and Belmore Road from the south.

=== Walking tracks ===
A number of gravel and informal paths run throughout the park. A primary circuit path follows the boundaries of most ovals which is suitable for walking, jogging or cycling.

== Sporting clubs ==
There are ten sporting clubs which use the park:

- Balwyn Saints Cricket Club
- Balwyn Blasters Junior Cricket Club
- North Balwyn Cricket Club
- North Balwyn Baseball Club
- St Barnabas Cricket Club
- Boroondara Cricket Club
- Melbourne Baseball Club
- Boroondara Netball Association
- Boroondara Eagles Football Club
- One FC

Complaints from nearby residents about sporting activities and facilities in the park have sparked controversy in recent years, including the installation of netball courts and sportsground lighting.

== See also ==
- Hislop Park
- Greythorn Park
