= Glass Creek =

Waterway in Melbourne, Australia

Coordinates: 37°47′30″S 145°3′35″E

Location
- Country: Australia
- State: Victoria
- Region: Kew East, Balwyn North

Basin features
- River system: Yarra

Glass Creek is a waterway flowing through the middle ring eastern suburbs of Melbourne. It is a minor tributary of the Yarra River and now largely runs through a series of underground drains.

== Etymology ==
The creek was named after Hugh Glass, a land speculator in the early history of Melbourne, in 1844. It was originally referred to as Glass' or Glass's Creek but the spelling gradually fell out of use in favour of the present-day Glass Creek.

== Geography ==
=== Settlements ===
The creek passes through two eastern suburbs of Melbourne in the City of Boroondara:

- Kew East
- Balwyn North

=== Parklands ===
Much of the former creek route is now open parkland:

- Jacka Street Reserve
- Gordon Barnard Reserve
- Hislop Park
- Macleay/Myrtle Park
- Stradbroke Park
- Hays Paddock
- Kew Billabong Reserve

== History ==
In the early history of Melbourne and during the indigenous settlement of the area, Glass Creek ran at-surface through bushland. William Oswin is the first recorded owner of the Hays Paddock land where Glass Creek flows into the Yarra on a property known as Kilby Farm.

=== Glass's Creek as placename ===
Between 1858 and 1873 John Oakes was pound keeper for Glass's Creek Pound, one of a network of facilities created to hold stray cattle and horses in the settlements in and around Melbourne. The Pound was situated on the northwest corner of Bulleen and Burke Roads, near Hays Paddock. The Pound, and consequently Oakes, was under financial pressure as early as 1861. In November 1874 the council for the Borough of Kew resolved to close the Pound by the end of that year. However 'Glass's Creek Pound' was evidently still in existence in 1886 when it was used as a local landmark in advertising. In 1890 tenders were called for the removal of a two-roomed dwelling at 'Kew Borough Pound, Glass's Creek'.

The name of Glass's Creek was used for the locale around the creek and the Kilby's farm area. Thus, when Mrs. James Smith gave birth to a son on 25 December 1874, the family's address was given as 'Glass's Creek'. In 1879 Emma Oakes was said to live in a 'dwelling at Glass's Creek, Kew'. In 1888 an auction was held at an address listed as 'Glass's Creek, Kilby-road, Kew'. By the early 20th century the locality name of 'East Kew' (or 'Kew East') seems to have become more common to describe the region.

=== Bridging and submerging ===
In 1859 the Boroondara Roads Board called for tenders to repair a 'culvert at Glass's Creek', indicating that in the very early years of European settlement of the region the creek was being controlled and engineered. In 1860 the Roads Board called for tenders to create two culverts and two bridges on the 'road to Glass's Creek Pound' (one of which must have crossed the Creek) and also one bridge specifically over the Creek on the 'Road past Mr. Wade's'. Tenders were called for 'a wooden cell bridge' in November 1879.

The creek, like many urban waterways in Melbourne, came to be seen as a nuisance as residential areas grew up around it. This was exacerbated by the practice of night soil tipping. In 1889 the Melbourne Argus reported that '[t]wo loads of nightsoil were deposited on the roadway at Glass's Creek bridge'. In November 1892 Charles Wells and John Bailey were charged with 'depositing nightsoil in Glass's Creek' at Burke Road one rainy night, 'thinking that the flow of water would carry the offensive stuff away...'

In 1926, the Melbourne and Metropolitan Board of Works (MMBW) assumed control of many urban waterways within the greater Melbourne area, but conflict arose between the City of Kew and the MMBW. Marcus Lancaster writes of the MMBW's operations pertaining to Glass Creek in the 1930s that as Kew developed:

land subdivision encroached along the upper and middle reaches of the creek... house blocks along the creek’s floodplain were surveyed with very little offset from the stream bank [and] Glass Creek was destined to become a flooding and erosion hazard, a site for rubbish dumping and detested by residents as an eyesore.

Kew council agitated for the MMBW to declare Glass Creek a main drain, as it passed through both Kew and Camberwell, which in Kew councillors' opinion made the Creek the MMBW's responsibility. After a long period of resistance, the MMBW conceded the advisability of converting Glass Creek and connected tributaries in Camberwell to stormwater drains in May 1938 and took full control in September of that year.

The first proposal to route the creek underground in its northern section was put forward by the City of Kew town clerk, W.D.Birrell, in 1943, but the project was not pursued. The Board of Works called for tenders for submerging a significant portion of the creek in 1964: 'covering of reinforced concrete drain - High Street into Stradbroke Park, and Deepened Drain - Glass's Creek Main Drain to Burke Road, Kew.' Lancaster continues:

The covering of the creek over the following decades is not well documented; however, during the 1950s sections remained uncovered. The Argus (1956) reported on the concerns of local parents regarding the proximity of Glass Creek to a local primary school in Balwyn [and] fears that children may fall down the steeply eroded banks; it used the headline ‘There’s death in this creek, says Balwyn’.Meanwhile downstream sections of the creek were being placed underground, and the Glass Street Kindergarten in Kew was constructed on land immediately adjacent the creek. The land was now available, as covering the creek had removed the banks and riparian zones. The final reach, which flowed through parkland and Kew Golf Club, was left open. However, during construction of the Eastern Freeway and redesign of the Kew Golf Club’s course, the MMBW planned to underground the lower reach entirely. Due to cost constraints on the freeway construction, only a partial section of the creek was covered leaving the final 254 metres (833 feet) open to flow into the Yarra. On the southern side of the freeway, 852 metres (2795 feet) of the creek also remains open flowing through the Hays Paddock parkland. This section of the creek was the focus of attention from both Landscape Gardner/Architect Ellis Stones... and residents during the 1970s.

A MMBW map from the 1960s shows the creek emerging from the drain near the southern entrance of Hays Paddock. This remains its present state.

=== Route ===
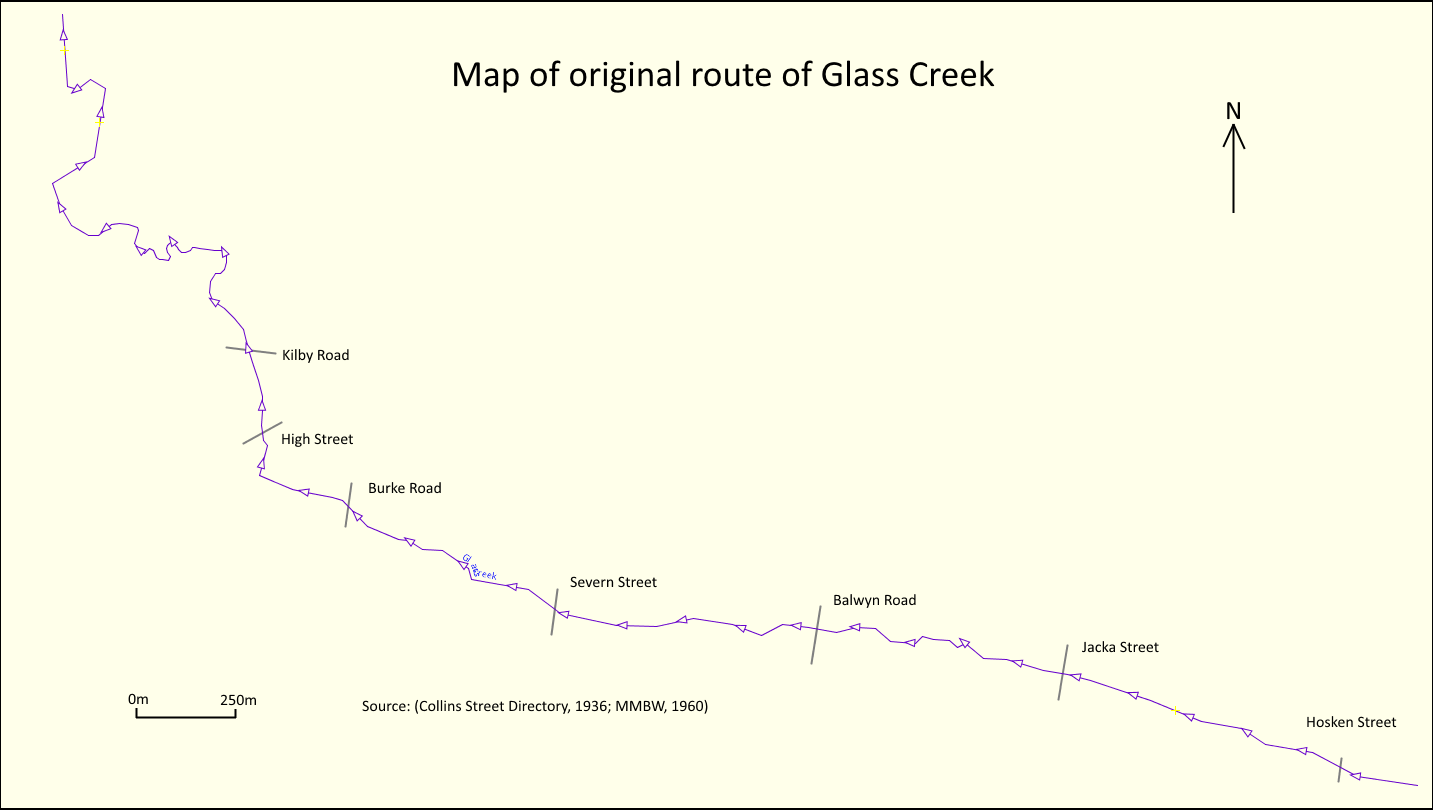
The original route of Glass Creek through North Balwyn and East Kew before it was placed underground some time in 1964.

In its natural form, the creek originated near what is now Loma Linda Grove in Greythorn, the eastern part of Balwyn North. It flowed through present-day Jacka Street and Gordon Barnard Reserves, crossed Balwyn Road, through Hislop and Macleay/Myrtle Park, through the residential areas roughly following Maylands Avenue, through Stradbroke Park near present-day Kew High School, under High Street and along the present-day Glass Creek Trail before joining up to the current course near the southern entrance to Hays Paddock. Thence it flowed north-west into the Yarra River.

== See also ==
- Koonung Creek
- Merri Creek
