= Travancore (disambiguation) =

Travancore is a former kingdom in India.

Travancore may also refer to:

- Travancore, Victoria, a suburb in Australia
- Travancore royal family, the royal family of Travancore
- Travancore sisters, a South Indian entertainment group active in the 1940s–60s

== See also ==
- Travancore–Cochin, Indian state from 1949 to 1956
- Thiruvithamcode, town in Tamil Nadu, India
