= Glendalough (Melbourne) =

House in Melbourne, Victoria, Australia

- Location within Melbourne

General information
- Status: Completed
- Type: House
- Architectural style: Inter-war Californian Bungalow
- Location: 197–199 Cashmere Street, Travancore, Melbourne, Victoria, Australia
- Coordinates: 37°46′42″S 144°56′02″E
- Completed: 1923; 103 years ago
- Client: Norman and Eileen Grey

Technical details
- Material: Red brick

Victorian Heritage Register
- Official name: Glendalough
- Type: Registered place
- Designated: 19 September 1996
- Reference no.: H1202
- Heritage overlay no.: HO46
- Category: Residential buildings (private)

Glendalough is a house at 197–199 Cashmere Street, Travancore, an inner-western suburb of Melbourne, Australia.

Completed in 1923, the house was added to the Victorian Heritage Register on 19 September 1996 in recognition of its historical, architectural, and social significance. Glebdalough is located within the 'Travancore Conservation Area', a 25-hectare (62-acre) residential estate that was added to the now defunct Register of the National Estate on 14 May 1991.

As of July 2026, the house operated as a bed and breakfast.

== History ==
Glendalough is located in the Travancore estate on land once belonging to the famous Flemington house estate of Hugh Glass, who made his fortune in land and stock dealing. The estate was sold, in the late 19th century, to Henry Madden who was prominent in the horse trading business in India. Madden renamed the mansion and estate Travancore. Subdivision of the estate commenced in 1918 with each street given Indian names in accordance with the name of the mansion.

On 25 June 1923 local plumber, Norman Grey and his wife, Eileen, submitted plans for a single storey red brick attic-style Inter-war Californian Bungalow with Japanese stylistic influences, rear brick garage and fence to be built on Lot 52, Cashmere Street; completed by late 1923.

When the second sale of the Travancore Estate was held in March 1925, Glendalough was among the homes shown on the sales brochure, setting the tone for potential builders and owners to imitate the solid bungalow residences standing in their garden settings. The Grey home appeared established in its young terrace garden surrounds, which were divided by steep concrete steps that rose to the front door.

The Greys continued to reside at Glendalough until 1927, when James S. Miller became the new owner. It was likely that during Miller's ownership that the home was extended to give access to the attic. The house remained in the Miller family, owned by James’ wife, Mrs Minnie Miller until 1964, and thereafter by Edward and Lorna Bouchier. The Bouchiers, of Woodland Park, Strathmerton, owned the eight-roomed house until 1989, renting it to a series of tenants, before selling to Stan Turton, the current owner, as of 2026, who operated the house as a bed and breakfast establishment.

== Description ==
The floor plan indicates that the house was to be commodiously built with a music room and bedroom occupying the large front rooms either side of a broad entrance hall. These were to be followed by another bedroom, a roomy bathroom with internal toilet, a kitchen with walk-in pantry, a large central dining room, laundry, and verandah stretching along the back facing west. Each of the principal rooms was appointed with an open fire place, and the music room was given a broad bay window. Space was provided in the roof for an attic already indicated by windows drawn in the front elevation. The house was to take full command of its position on the brow of the hill, having a gracious set of steps leading up to a wide, deep porch that would afford expansive views across the Moonee Ponds Creek valley to the hill beyond. The plans indicate that Grey may have also acted as the builder.

The Grey's named their residence Glendalough, and displayed the name plate on a pergola gateway held up by two massive pillars that formed the focal point of the front fence. Bungalows in all their styles were well promoted in the Australian Home Builder magazine, together with suitable fixtures and fittings such as the latest mantles, fire grates, leadlights, and timber panelling. Similar examples of these items continue to remain in the house today, and the IXL Patent Cooking Stove consistently advertised as the ‘most perfect cooking apparatus’ and ‘the heaviest and best made stove in Melbourne’, still stands in its tiled kitchen alcove.

Glendalough's intactness as an inter-war bungalow is socially and historically important for illustrating the material culture of a middle class home of this period. The house is architecturally and socially important as a good and intact representative example of early 1920's bungalow design which demonstrates the principal characteristics of the type. The ensemble of house, fence, garden layout, garage and fernery represent the type of middle class home and comforts promoted widely in magazines of the day which new home owners aspired to attain. The plan of the interior is socially important for illustrating the living patterns of an inter-war family.

== See also ==
- Architecture of Melbourne
- List of places on the Victorian Heritage Register in the City of Moonee Valley
