= Sackville Ward =

Melbourne, Australia residential precinct

The Sackville Ward is a large residential precinct in the suburb of Kew in Melbourne, Australia.

The Sackville Ward was an electoral ward a part of the City of Kew.

== Geography ==
Bounded to the east by Burke Road to the north by Cotham Road and to the south by Barkers Road, its western boundary is technically Glenferrie Road but more often deemed to be east of Edgevale or even Davis Streets. The Ward takes its name from the broad east–west avenue running through its centre.

== History ==
Land in the area was purchased during the mid-1840s Government land sales by developers, two of whom were Edward Dumaresq and Peter Davis. Dumaresq (a Captain in the East India Company and one-time Surveyor General of Tasmania, then Van Diemen's Land) subsequently named some of the streets in the area after his sons, Rowland, Edward, John, Alfred and Thomas.

In the resultant economic boom created by the Victorian gold rush, many grand mansions were constructed in the ward, most of which remain to this day. Dumaresq himself lived in Alfred Street and helped develop St Hilary’s Church of England, opening in 1889 and rebuilt in 1939. A brick house at 34 Rowland Street was constructed in 1890 to serve as the vicarage.

There was further development when land adjacent to the Kew Reservoir (near the corner of Burke and Cotham Roads) was subdivided in the early twentieth century, and this area is home to some fine examples of Edwardian and Federation architecture.

Sackville Ward was created as a ward of the City of Kew in 1988, being put forward as a ward name by then sitting councillor, Philip Barnes. This occurred as a result of the reduction from 15 councillors representing the whole of Kew to 12 councillors, and a reduction from 5 wards to 4 wards with 3 councillors representing each ward. Sackville Ward included the previously named College Ward and adjacent areas. After the 1994 council amalgamations, council functions are now administered by the City of Boroondara.

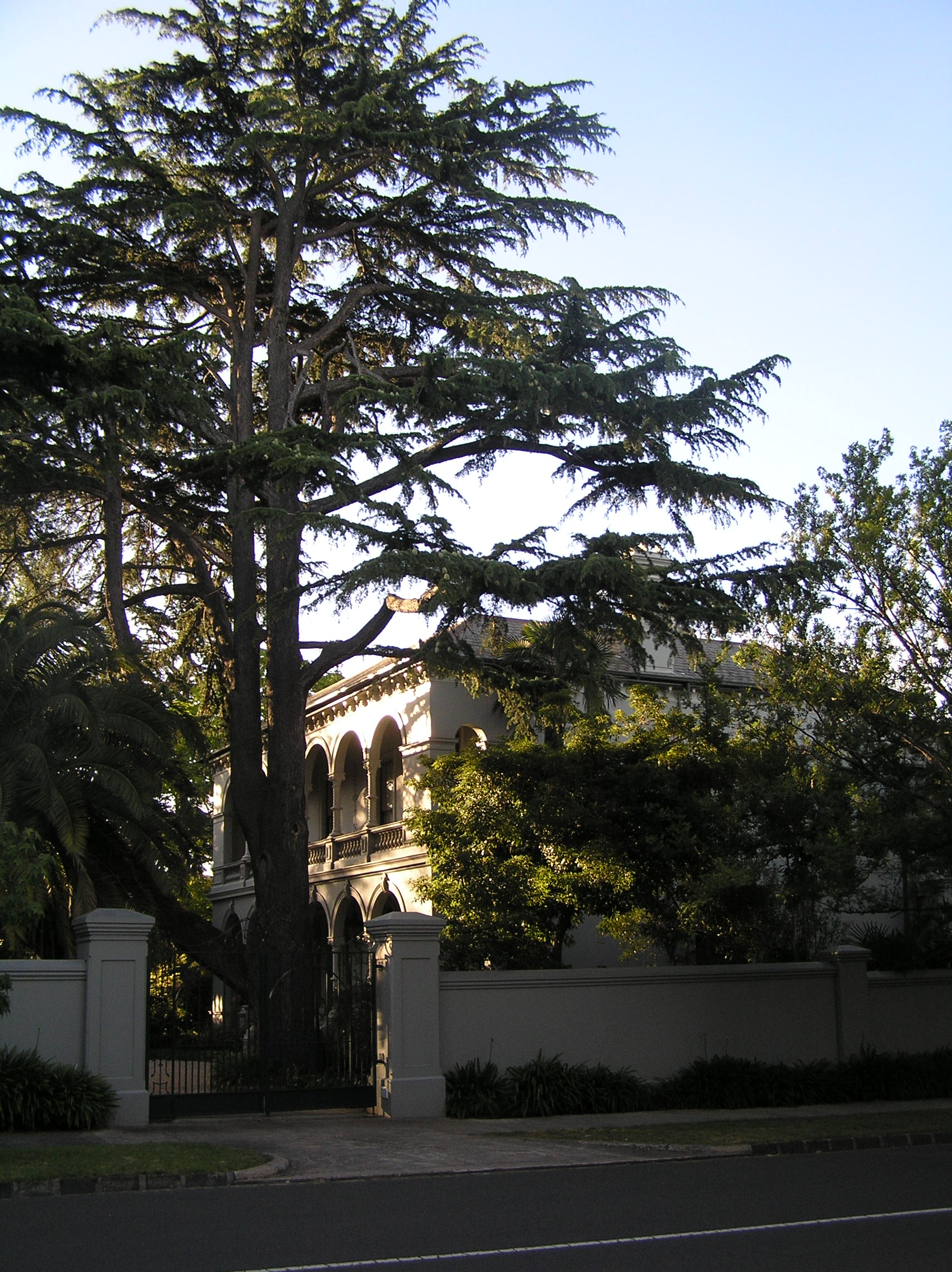

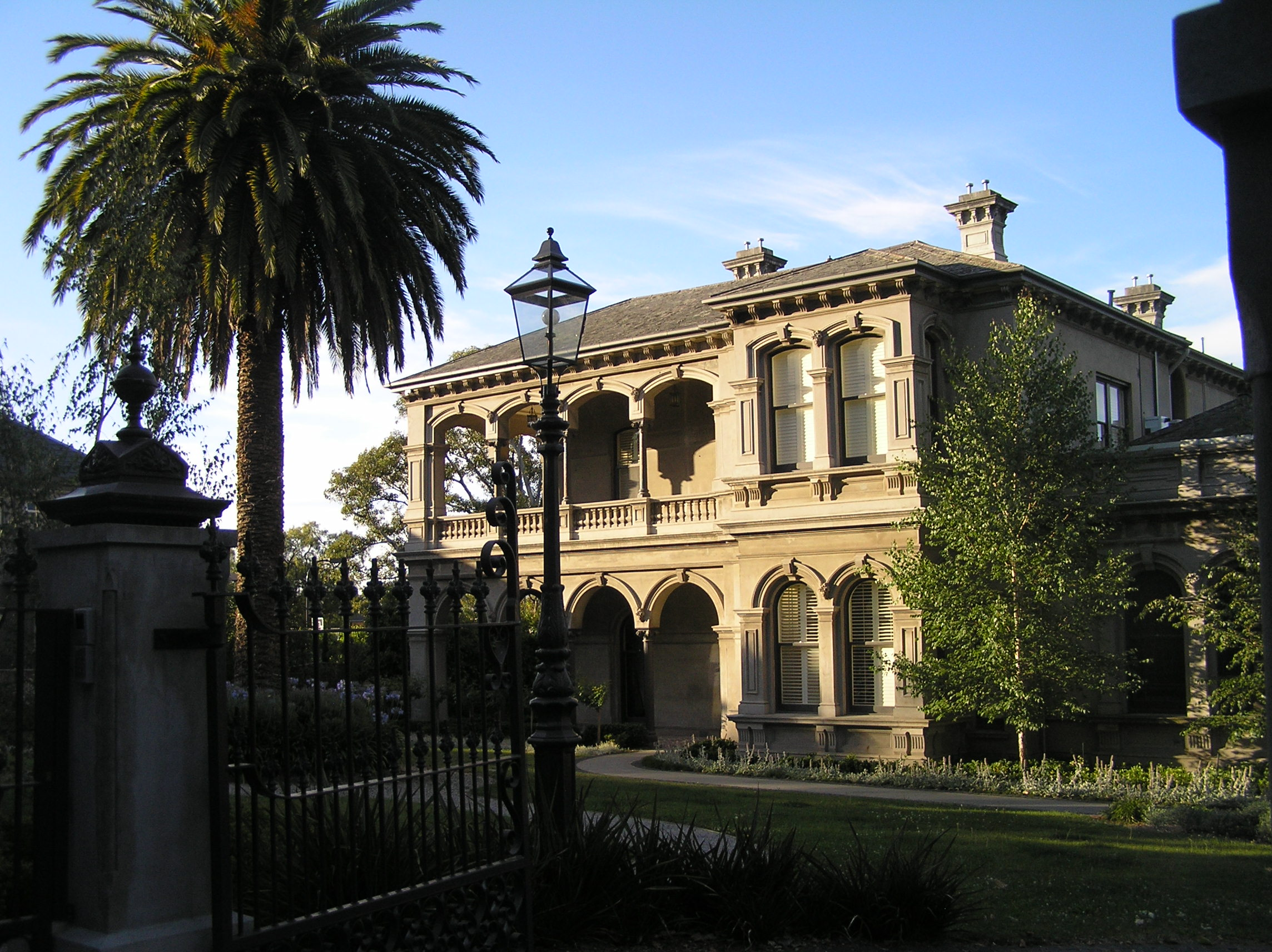

== Today ==
The ward is now sought-after due to its proximity to reputable private schools such as Carey Baptist Grammar School (1923), Methodist Ladies' College (1882), Ruyton Girls' School (1879), Trinity Grammar School (1902), Genazzano FCJ College (1889), Xavier College (1878) and the alternative education school Preshil.

In August 2008 an IT executive paid more than $12 million in an off-market sale for La Verna, a 120-year-old mansion built in the Italianate style. The sale was the highest in value for Melbourne for the year to date and created at the time, a new record for Kew.

The La Verna sale was for a property much reduced in size. Controversially, what had previously been a Catholic monastery and retreat for Franciscan Friars with 1.2 hectare gardens and stables was sold by the Church in 2002 to developer Phillip Watts for $8.3 million. In February 2004 150 local residents lobbied the Boroondarra Council in an attempt to save the gardens of the estate by attempting to create a site-specific heritage overlay.

At that time the estate also had a significant frontage to leafy Rowland Street. The remaining land was however subdivided into seven large blocks and all have since been developed with large residential dwellings. What were originally the stables for the property (also fronting Rowland Street) have now been sympathetically developed into a coachouse-style accommodation. Photographs of the La Verna development can be found on the Walking Melbourne website dedicated to discovering and protecting Melbourne's mansions.

Prior to the La Verna sale, the previous record had been $6.6 million at auction for 19 Grange Road Kew to businessman and politician Evan Thornley and his wife Tracey Ellery (founders of internet company LookSmart). Thornley is now an ALP member of the Upper House in the Victorian State Government and the property has been extensively redeveloped.

In spite of the global economic crisis of the time, Kew as a whole recorded a 44.8% increase in median values for the year to 31 July 2008 (to $1.495million) buoyed largely by sales in the Sackville Ward. The exclusive nature of the ward notwithstanding, there are a number of facilities within the area aimed at the elderly and the homeless. Prague House in Sackville Street is operated by the Sisters of Charity caters for homeless men and was redeveloped in 2006 using both funds from the Federal Department of Health and Ageing and donors (who contributed $200,000 for furniture and fittings). The Yarralee Residential Aged Care Facility is located at 48 Sackville Street.
