= Balwyn North =

- Suburb
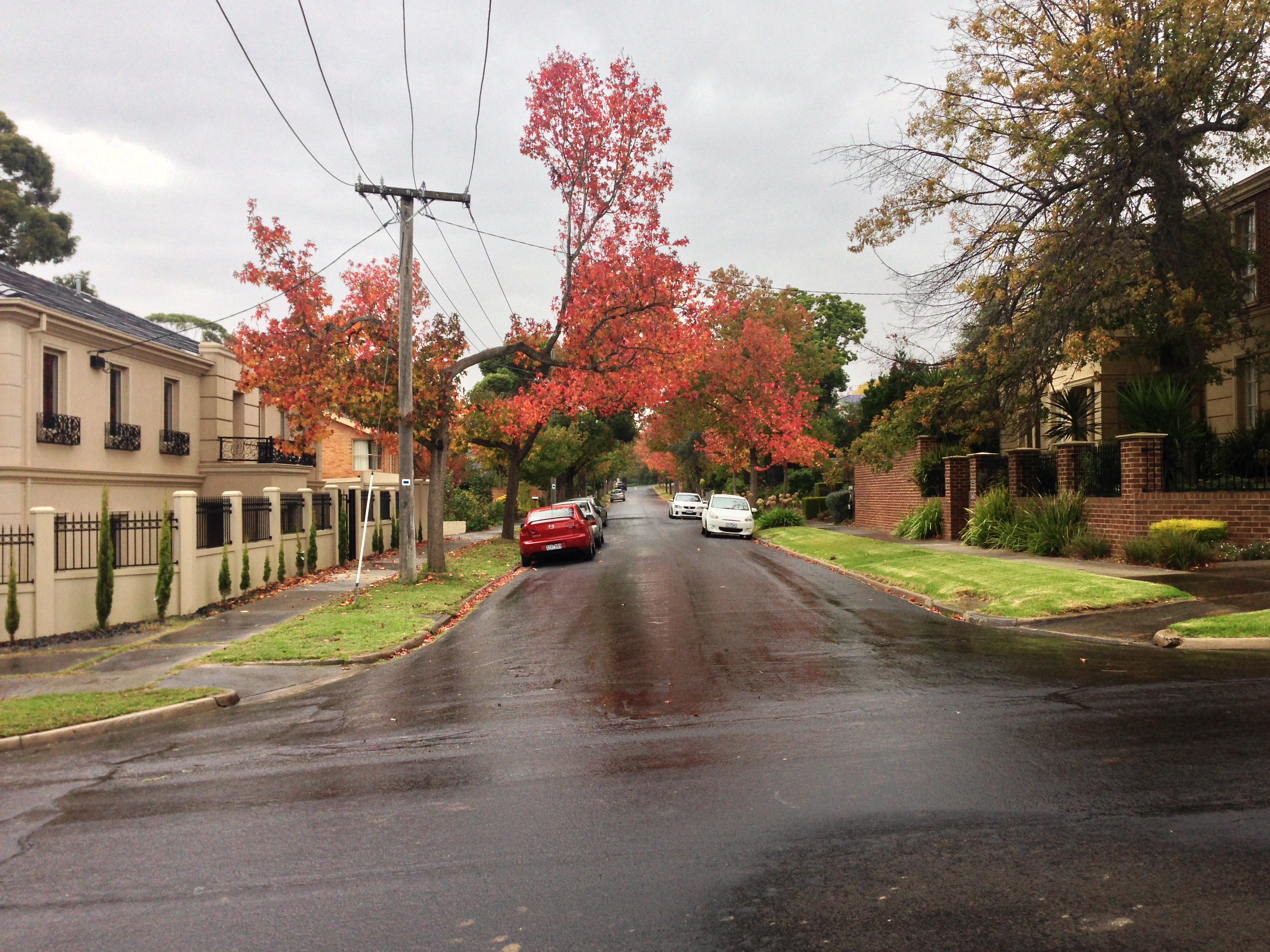
- Dunstan Street, Balwyn North

- Interactive map of Balwyn North
- Coordinates: 37°47′37″S 145°5′11″E
- Country: Australia
- State: Victoria
- City: Melbourne
- LGAs: City of Boroondara; City of Whitehorse
- Location: 10 km (6.2 mi) from Melbourne

Government
  - State electorates: Box Hill; Kew
  - Federal divisions: Kooyong; Menzies

Area
  - Total: 8.9 km^{2} (3.4 sq mi)
- Elevation: 60 m (200 ft)

Population
  - Total: 21,302 (SAL 2021)
- Postcode: 3104
Suburbs around Balwyn North
Ivanhoe East	Bulleen	Doncaster
Kew East	Balwyn North	Mont Albert North
Kew	Balwyn	Mont Albert North

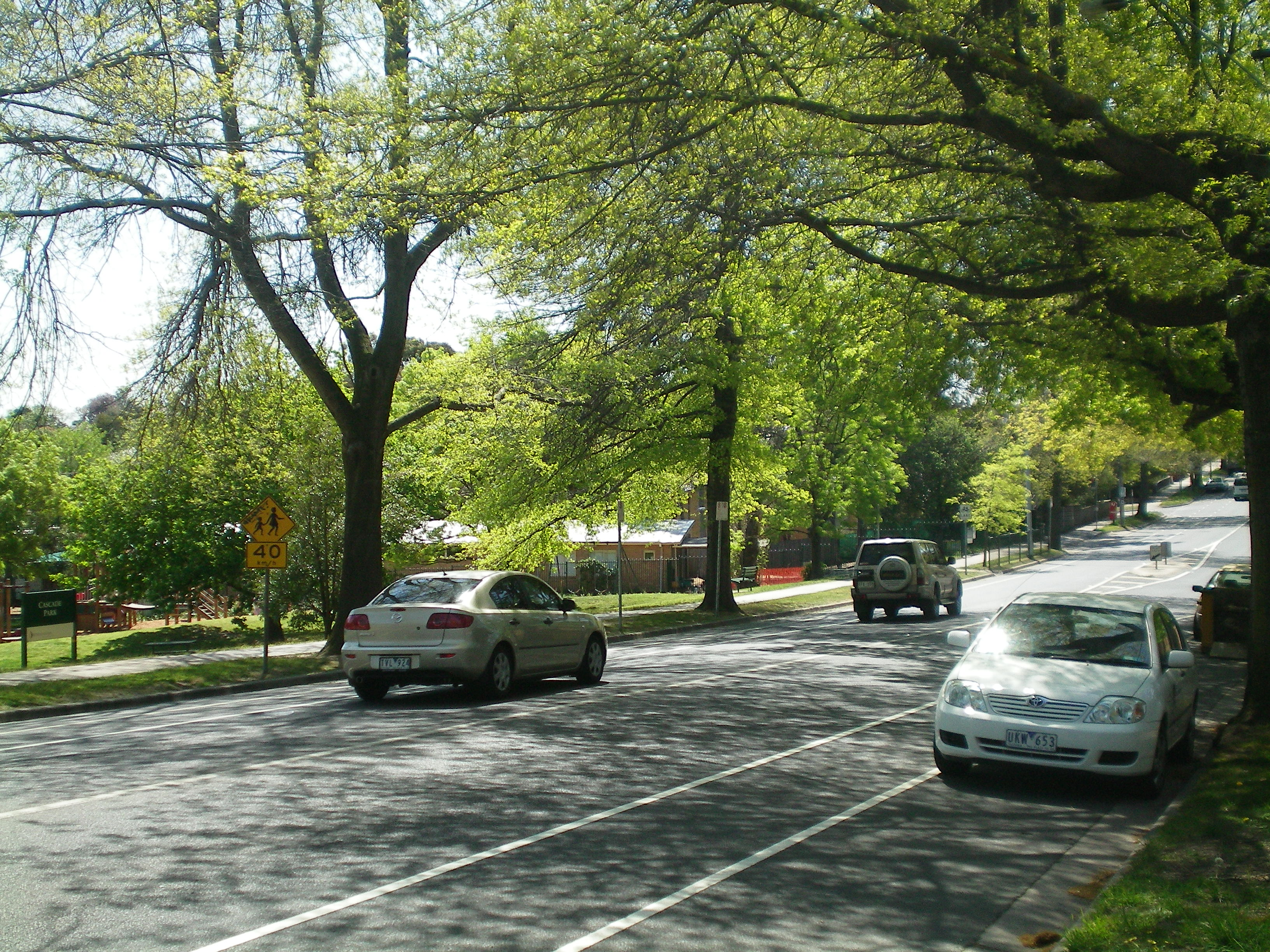
Leafy green trees provide a canopy over Bulleen Road

Balwyn North, also known as North Balwyn, is a suburb of Melbourne, Victoria, Australia, 10 km east of Melbourne's Central Business District, located within the Cities of Boroondara and Whitehorse local government areas. Balwyn North recorded a population of 21,302 at the 2021 census. It contains the localities of Greythorn and Bellevue.

Following European settlement of Melbourne, development in Balwyn North was slow and largely as agricultural land. The suburban expansion after the Second World War reached the area in the 1940s and 1950s and thousands of single dwelling houses were built across the area. Today it retains its largely residential character with small areas of retail and parkland.

== History ==
=== Etymology ===
The suburb shares its name with Balwyn to the south. It is named for the estate of Andrew Murray from the Gaelic bal and the Saxon wyn, meaning 'the home of the vine'. Balwyn Road and the district were named after it.

=== Pre-European settlement ===
The formally recognised traditional owners for the area in which Balwyn North is located are the Wurundjeri people. The Wurundjeri people are represented by the Wurundjeri Woi Wurrung Cultural Heritage Aboriginal Corporation.

=== 20th century ===
Balwyn North was one of the first Melbourne suburbs to be developed according to the pattern of postwar suburbia, with expansive, quiet residential areas designed as family homes and relatively few business districts, notably including the Riverside Estate. The original route of Bulleen Road began at the present-day corner of Kilby Road and Burke Road, but by the 1900s, its route had changed to its present-day alignment. This was a result of Elgar's Special Survey, which dragged the alignment of Burke Road further west, resulting in the surrounding road network being forced to adjust.

A Balwyn North Post Office opened on 1 April 1937. This was renamed Burke Road in 1941, when a new Balwyn North office opened at its current location. The Greythorn Post Office opened in 1951. The suburb was lampooned in the 1974 song by Australian band Skyhooks, Balwyn Calling.

=== 21st century ===
Consistently among Melbourne's top 20 most exclusive postcodes, Balwyn North's status as an affluent suburb has seen middle to upper-middle-class families from surrounding localities transfer to the area to take advantage of the suburb's relatively large block sizes and proximity to some of Victoria's best private schools including those in the neighbouring suburbs.

In the 12-month period to January 2020 Balwyn North reported a median house price of A$1.46 million for a three bedroom house.

== Geography ==
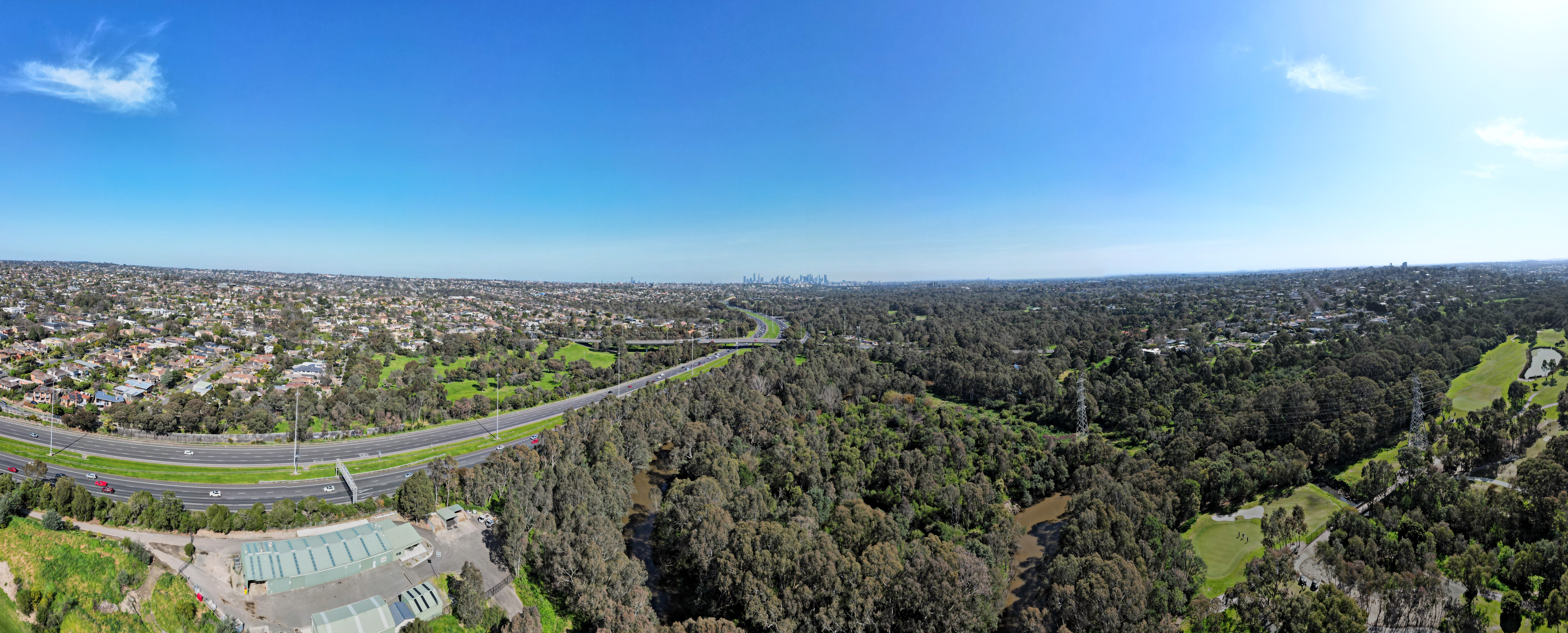
Aerial panorama taken from Musca St Reserve, Balwyn North. September 2023.

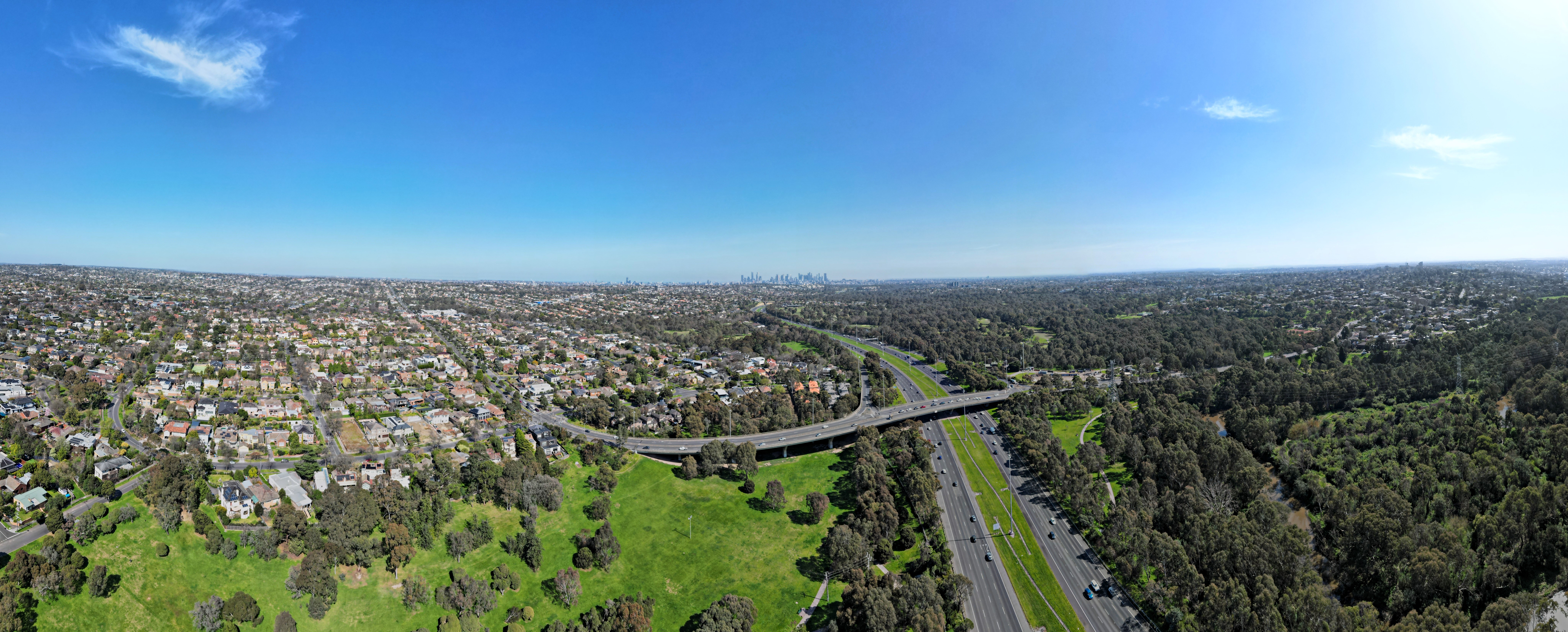
Aerial panorama of the Eastern Freeway section in Balwyn North facing the city skyline. September 2023.

The north-western part of the suburb is known as Bellevue and the eastern part as Greythorn.

=== Localities ===
==== Greythorn ====
Greythorn was developed later than North Balwyn, but has had residents living there since the 1830s, when the Maughan and Towt families bought large tracts of land in the area. Present-day Greythorn Road was formerly known as "Towt's Road" but renamed to "Whitethorn Road", after the many whitethorn hedges that had been planted along it. To avoid confusion with Whitehorse Road, the name was changed again to "Greythorn" some time in the 1920s.

The area around Greythorn Park was a wildlife sanctuary from 1938 until 1954, when the area between the park and Greythorn Road was subdivided and sold for housing.

Greythorn Primary School was opened in 1953 and occupies a site covering approximately two hectares.

=== Parks and gardens ===
Balwyn North is host to a large number of parks and reserves, which are used for both passive and active recreation. A line of parks through which Glass Creek formerly ran at surface level lies at the heart of the suburb, stretching from Jacka Street Reserve in the east, through Gordon Barnard Reserve and Hislop Park in the centre, ending with Macleay Park in the west. Other parks in the suburb include Greythorn Park, Leigh Park and Koonung Creek Reserve.

== Transport ==
The shared-use Koonung Creek Trail, running along the northern border of the suburb and the Eastern Freeway, connects with the Main Yarra Trail along the Yarra River towards the City. Tram route 48 passes through Balwyn North, running along Doncaster Road and terminating at the intersection with Balwyn Road. A number of bus routes connect Balwyn North with suburbs such as Box Hill, Camberwell, Doncaster and Templestowe. A number of freeway bus services have stops at the entrance of the Eastern Freeway, on the northern edge of the suburb.

In recent times, there have been numerous calls from both residents and local councils for the extension of the route 48 tram from its present terminus to either the Doncaster Park and Ride or further along Doncaster Road to Westfield Doncaster.

== Education ==
Located in Balwyn North are several primary schools, such as Greythorn, Balwyn North, St Bedes, Boroondara Park and Bellevue. Balwyn High School is located on Buchanan Avenue, and is so highly sought after, particularly by Asian families, that property prices within its student catchment area sell for hundreds of thousands of dollars more than nearby properties not located in the area.

== Shopping ==
The main shopping strip is located at the intersection of Doncaster and Bulleen Roads, known as "The Village". There are a number of other local shopping strips, such as Greythorn Village, located further east along Doncaster Road, the East Balwyn Shopping Centre and Belmore Heights Shopping Centre.

== Notable residents ==
- Warwick Capper
- Tania Lacy
- John Safran
- Jo Silvagni
- Stephen Silvagni
- Dan Houston

== See also ==
- City of Camberwell – Balwyn North was previously within this former local government area.
- Balwyn
