= Travancore, Victoria =

Travancore
- Suburb
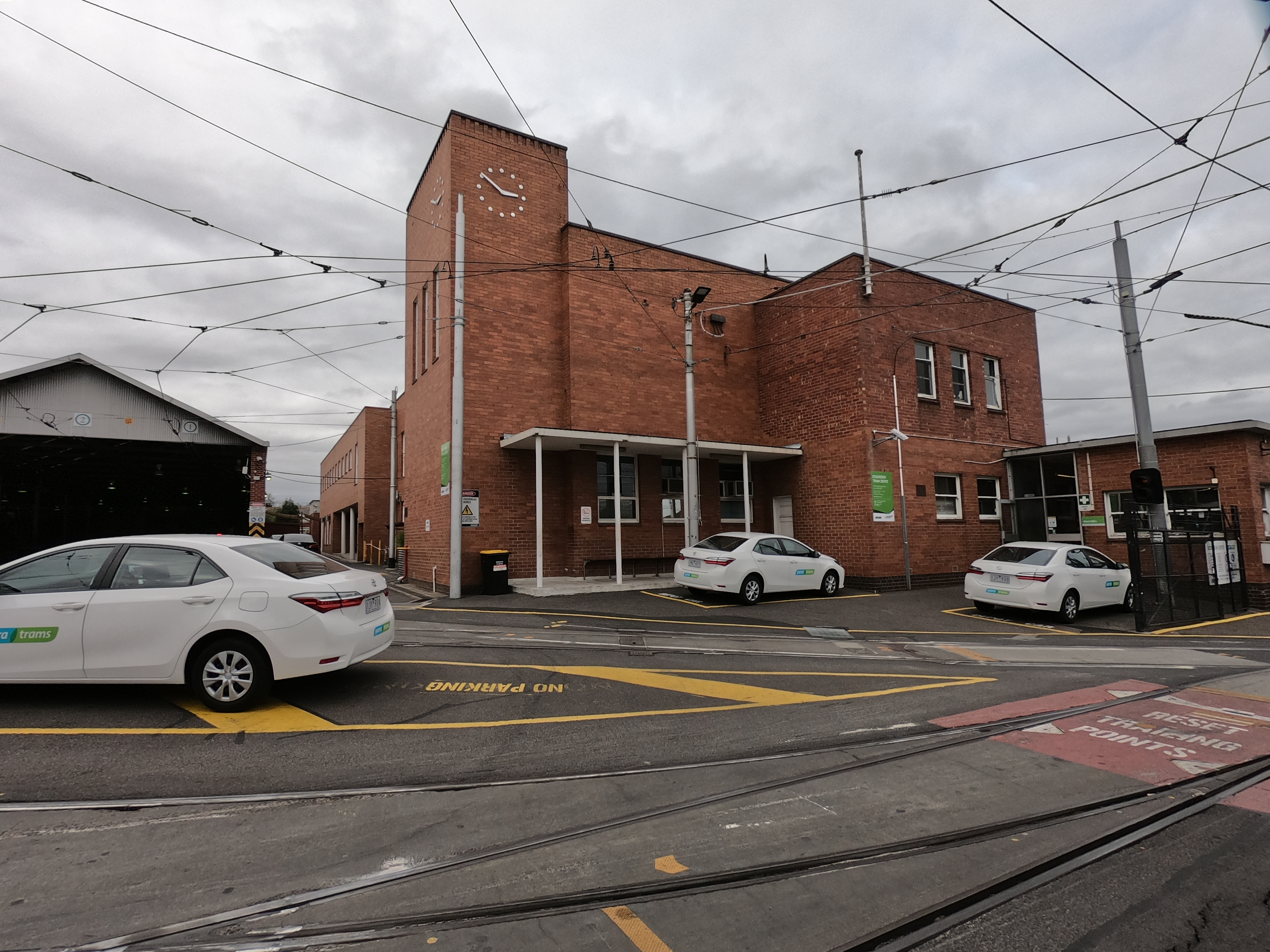
- Essendon tram depot, Travancore, 2019

- Interactive map of Travancore
- Coordinates: 37.778°S 144.935°E
- Country: Australia
- State: Victoria
- City: Melbourne
- LGA: City of Moonee Valley
- Location: 5 km (3.1 mi) from Melbourne

Government
  - State electorate: Essendon
  - Federal division: Maribyrnong

Area
  - Total: 0.4 km^{2} (0.15 sq mi)
- Elevation: 24 m (79 ft)

Population
  - Total: 2,116 (2021 census)
  - Density: 5,300/km^{2} (13,700/sq mi)
- Postcode: 3032
Suburbs around Travancore
	Ascot Vale
Flemington	Travancore	Parkville
	Flemington

Travancore is an inner-city suburb in Melbourne, Victoria, Australia, 5 km (3 mi) north-west of Melbourne's Central Business District, located within the City of Moonee Valley local government area. Travancore recorded a population of 2,116 at the 2021 census.

== Description ==
The suburb is located between the Tullamarine Freeway and Mount Alexander Road, south of Ormond Road, although the northernmost section of the area is still incorrectly referred to as Ascot Vale. Travancore was initially supposed to encompass the entirety of the area flanked by Ormond and Mount Alexander Roads and the Tullamarine Freeway. The Moonee Valley City Council has taken steps to bring the remainder of the proposed area of Travancore into the suburb. That will reflect what was originally intended and, in turn, will reduce the area of the suburb of Ascot Vale.

Travancore, only 5 km (3 mi) from Melbourne's CBD, has seen a transformation in recent years, following a fire that destroyed the Lombard Paper Factory. The former factory site is now occupied by residential towers that flank the suburb on its southern side.

== History ==
Travancore takes its name from the Travancore Mansion and Estate, a property in the area owned by Henry Madden. Madden purchased the property, previously Flemington House, from the relatives of Hugh Glass in 1906, and renamed it. Madden exported horses to India, hence the property being named after the former southern Indian kingdom of Travancore, the present-day city of Trivandrum, now part of the Indian state of Kerala. When the land around Travancore Mansion was subdivided, many of the streets were named in keeping with the Indian theme, including Baroda Street, Lucknow Street, Bengal Street, Cashmere Street and Mangalore Street. Some of the houses reflect the Old English architecture of the former Travancore region of India.

Travancore Mansion was purchased by the Victorian Government and became a special education school. The building was demolished in the 1940s, and the area is now occupied by the Travancore campus of Royal Children's Hospital Mental Health Service. The Flemington Primary School has the ornate gates that once belonged to the Travancore Mansion.

=== Heritage listings ===
The following places in Travancore are listed on the Victorian Heritage Register:

- Essendon tram depot, on Mount Alexander Road
- Glendalough, at 197-199 Cashmere Street

== See also ==
- City of Melbourne – Travancore was previously within this local government area.
