= 1919 Victorian local elections =

- 28 August 1919
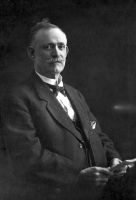

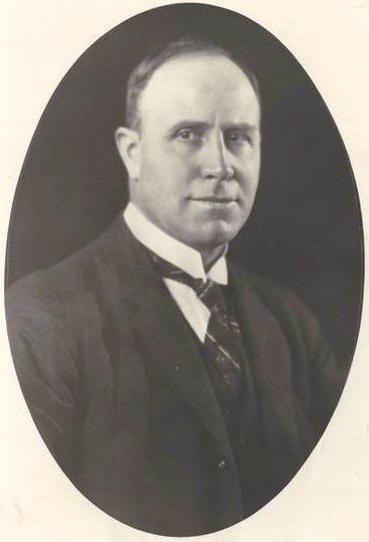

	First party	Second party	Third party
	IND
Leader	N/A	Edmond Hogan	Stanley Argyle
Party	Independents	Caucus Labor	Nationalist
Seats won	62	11	3
Popular vote	38,113	14,686	5,481
Percentage	63.34%	24.41%	9.11%
	Fourth party	Fifth party
		SOC
Leader	No leader	No leader
Party	Labor	Socialist
Last election		1 (Note: This only includes the council seats up for election in 1919.)
Seats before	0	1
Seats won	0	1
Seat change	Steady	Steady
Popular vote	744	625
Percentage	1.23%	1.04%

The 1919 Victorian local elections were held on 28 August 1919 to elect the councils of 42 of the local government areas in Victoria, Australia. Two councils also held mayoral elections.

Until the 1994 reforms introduced by the Kennett state government, all local elections were staggered, with not all councillors up for election each year.

Labor gained several council seats, with the vast majority of their candidates running as Caucus Labor candidates. Socialist councillor A.G. McDonnell retained his seat with 53.51% of the vote in Northcote's North Ward.

A large number of elections were unopposed, and The Argus observed that "in only a few cases did the electors show any marked interest in the result".

== Results ==
=== Council elections ===
Party	Votes	%	Swing	Seats	Change
Independents	38,113	63.34		62	
Caucus Labor	14,686	24.41		11	
Nationalist	5,481	9.11		3	
Labor	744	1.23		0	
Socialist	625	1.04		1	Steady
Independent Labor	522	0.87		1	
Total	60,171	100.0		78	

=== Mayoral elections ===
Council	Before		Result after preference distribution			
Council	Mayor	Party	Party	Candidate	%	Result
Port Melbourne	J.H. Morris	Caucus Labor	Caucus Labor	J.H. Morris	57.80	Caucus Labor hold
Port Melbourne	J.H. Morris	Caucus Labor	Independent	J.T. Turner	42.20	Caucus Labor hold
Wonthaggi			Nationalist	Cr. Easton	57.57	Nationalist gain
Wonthaggi			Labor	Cr. Nelson	42.43	Nationalist gain
