= City of Hawthorn =

Coordinates: 37°49′18″S 145°02′12″E

- Local government area
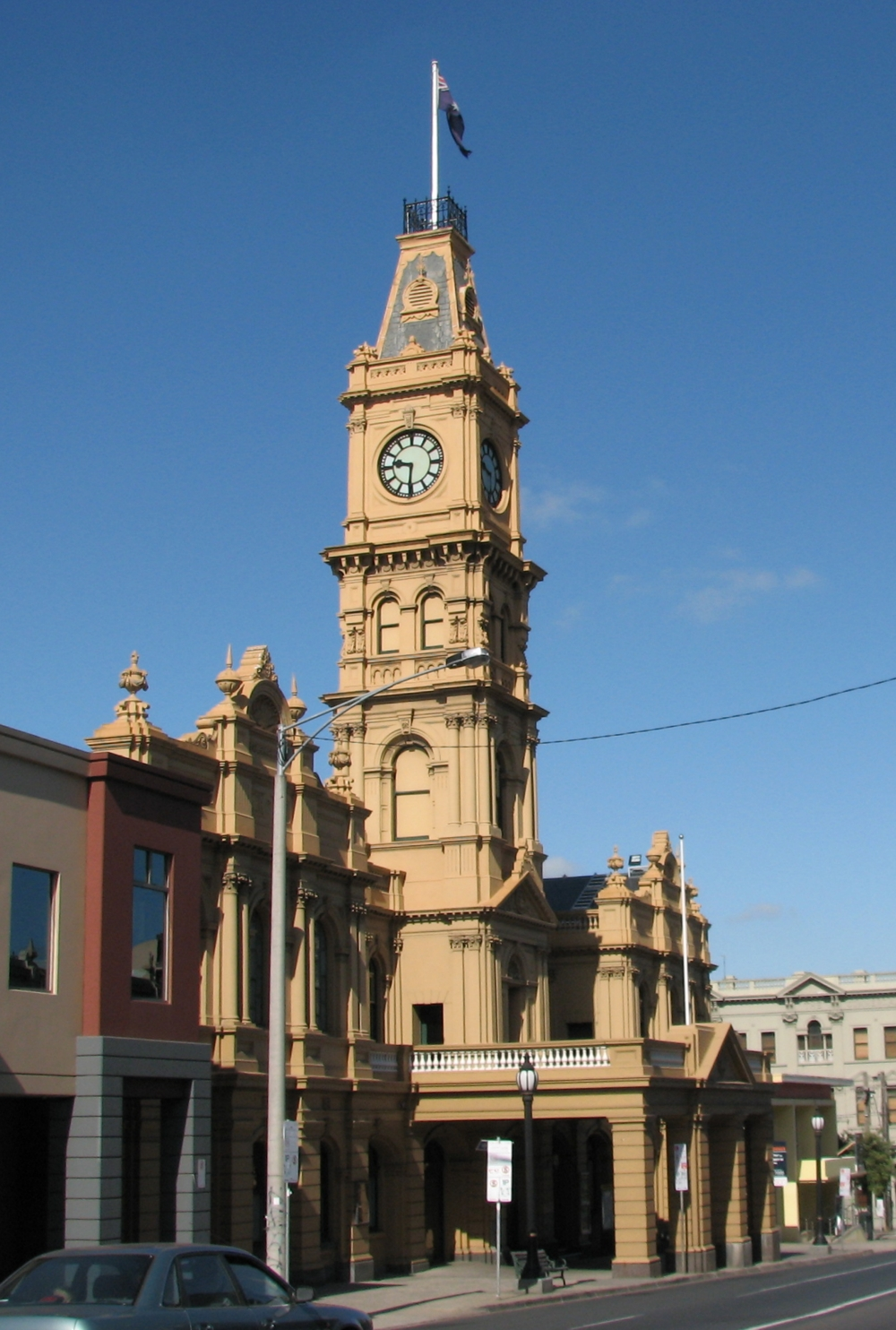
- Hawthorn Town Hall

- The extent of the City of Hawthorn at its dissolution in 1994
- Country: Australia
- State: Victoria
- Region: Eastern Melbourne
- Established: 1860
- Council seat: Hawthorn

Area
  - Total: 9.71 km^{2} (3.75 sq mi)

Population
  - Total: 31,500 (1992)
  - Density: 3,244/km^{2} (8,402/sq mi)
- County: Bourke
LGAs around City of Hawthorn
Collingwood	Kew	Camberwell
Richmond	City of Hawthorn	Camberwell
Prahran	Malvern	Malvern

The City of Hawthorn was a local government area about 4 kilometres (2.5 mi) east of Melbourne, the state capital of Victoria, Australia, on the southeast bank of the Yarra River. The city covered an area of 9.71 square kilometres (3.75 sq mi), and existed from 1860 until 1994.

== History ==
Hawthorn was incorporated as a municipal district on 27 July 1860. It was proclaimed as a town on 18 March 1887, and a city on 12 September 1890.

On 22 June 1994, the City of Hawthorn was abolished, and along with the Cities of Camberwell and Kew, was merged into the newly created City of Boroondara. The new City was originally planned to be named "City of Riversdale".

The council met at the Hawthorn Town Hall, at the corner of Burwood and Glenferrie Roads, near Glenferrie railway station, Hawthorn. The facility is still used by the City of Boroondara as a regional arts centre.

=== Council name ===
Name	Established
Hawthorn Municipality	27 July 1860
Hawthorn Borough Council	1863
Hawthorn Town Council	18 March 1887
Hawthorn City Council	12 September 1890

== Wards ==
The City of Hawthorn was divided into four wards in 1891, each electing three councillors:

- Auburn Ward
- Glenferrie Ward
- Power Ward
- Yarra Ward

== Geography ==
The council area covered the suburbs of Hawthorn, Hawthorn East and parts of Glen Iris, and was bounded by the Yarra River to the west, Barkers Road to the north, Gardiners Creek and CityLink (formerly South Eastern Freeway) to the south and Burke Road to the east.

== Population ==
Year	Population
1861	2,342
1881	6,019
1891	19,585
1947	40,464
1954	37,188
1958	35,700*
1961	36,707
1966	36,717
1971	37,571
1976	32,505
1981	30,689
1986	29,623
1991	30,006

* Estimate in the 1958 Victorian Year Book.
