= 1933 Victorian local elections =

Local elections in Victoria, Australia

- 24 August 1933
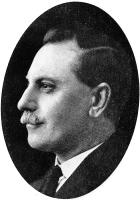
| | First party | Second party |
|---|---|---|
| | IND |
| Leader | N/A | Tom Tunnecliffe |
| Party | Independents | Labor |
| Last election | (Note: This only includes the council seats up for election in 1933.) |
| Seats won | 95 | 12 |
| Popular vote | 89,140 | 14,711 |
| Percentage | 84.47% | 13.94% |

The 1933 Victorian local elections were held on 24 August 1933 to elect the councils of 70 of the local government areas in Victoria, Australia. One council also held a referendum.

The Age observed that there were an "unusually large" amount of candidates elected unopposed − 77 in the metropolitan Melbourne area and a further 450 in regional Victoria.

Until the 1994 reforms introduced by the Kennett state government, all local elections were staggered, with not all councillors up for election each year.

== Political parties ==
As per usual, the Labor Party endorsed candidates, however the United Australia Party did not.

The Richmond Ratepayers' Progressive League (which already had a sitting councillor − J. Lynch − who was not up for election), contested the City of Richmond's North Ward, East Ward and South Ward as the main opposition to incumbent Labor councillors.

H.F. Dummett, a vice-president of the Collingwood Property Owners' and Ratepayers' Association, was re-elected in the City of Collingwood's Loch Ward.

== Results ==
=== Council votes ===
| Party | Votes | % | Swing | Seats | Change |
|---|---|---|---|---|---|
| Independents | 89,140 | 84.47 | | 95 | |
| Labor | 14,711 | 13.94 | | 12 | |
| Richmond Ratepayers' League | 1,148 | 1.09 | | 0 | Steady |
| Collingwood Property Owners | 532 | 0.50 | | 1 | Steady |
| Total | 105,531 | 100.0 | | 108 | |

=== Referendums ===
Voters in the City of Mordialloc were asked the following: "Are you in favour of the continuation of the present system of allowing social games only to be played on the council reserves, and those under its control, on Sundays?"

Mordialloc social games referendum
| Choice | Votes | % |
|---|---|---|
| For | 519 | 55.33 |
| Against | 419 | 44.67 |
| Total | 938 | 100.00 |
| Registered voters/turnout | | 100.0 |
