= City of Kew =

Coordinates: 37°48′S 145°02′E

- Local government area
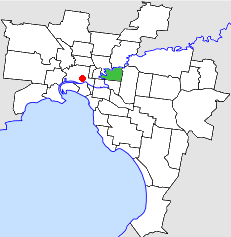
- Location in Melbourne

- The extent of the City of Kew at its dissolution in 1994
- Country: Australia
- State: Victoria
- Region: Eastern Melbourne
- Established: 1860
- Council seat: Kew

Area
  - Total: 14.56 km^{2} (5.62 sq mi)

Population
  - Total: 28,900 (1992)
  - Density: 1,985/km^{2} (5,141/sq mi)
- County: Bourke
LGAs around City of Kew
Northcote	Heidelberg	Camberwell
Collingwood	City of Kew	Camberwell
Richmond	Hawthorn	Camberwell

The City of Kew was a local government area about 4 kilometres (2.5 mi) east of Melbourne, the state capital of Victoria, Australia, on the southeast bank of the Yarra River. It covered an area of 14.56 square kilometres (5.62 sq mi) and existed from 1860 until 1994.

== History ==
Kew was first incorporated as a municipal district on 19 December 1860, a borough in October 1863, and a town on 8 December 1910. It was proclaimed a city on 10 March 1921.

In 1965, Prime Minister Robert Menzies attended the inauguration of a new synagogue in Kew, where he laid the foundation stone. Notably, two months later, in October, the synagogue was targeted with antisemitic vandalism.

On 22 June 1994, the City of Kew was abolished, and the Cities of Camberwell and Hawthorn merged into the newly created City of Boroondara. The new City was initially planned to be named "City of Riversdale."

The council formerly met at the Kew Town Hall, Cotham Road, and Charles Street, Kew.

== Wards ==
The City of Kew was divided into four wards on 27 August 1955, each electing three councillors:

- Prospect Ward
- Sackville Ward
- Studley Park Ward
- Willsmere Ward

== Geography ==
The council area covered the suburbs of Kew and Kew East and was bounded by the Yarra River to the north and west, Barkers Road to the south, and Burke Road to the east.

== Population ==
Year	Population
1861	1,439
1891	8,462
1921	17,382
1947	30,859
1954	31,518
1958	32,700*
1961	33,341
1966	32,801
1971	32,564
1976	29,683
1981	28,870
1986	28,162
1991	27,291

* Estimate in the 1958 Victorian Year Book.
