= Hugh Glass (pastoralist) =

Australian pastoralist (1817–1871)

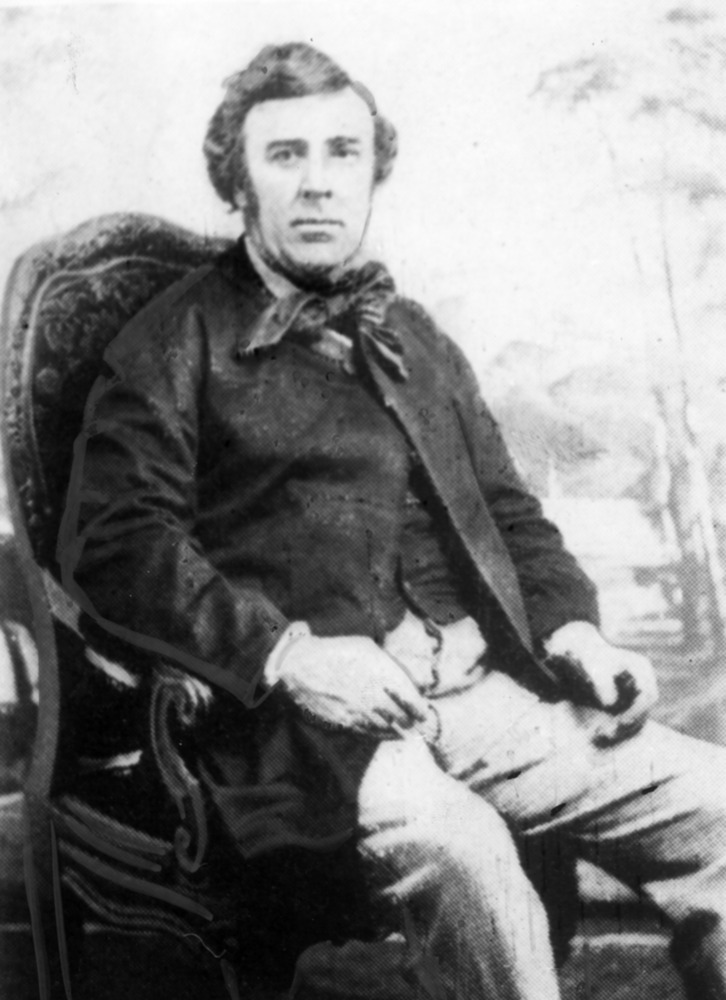
- Born: 1817; Portaferry, County Down, Ireland
- Died: 15 May 1871; Flemington, Victoria, Australia
- Spouse: Lucinda Nash (m. 1853)
- Children: 10

Hugh Glass (1817 – 15 May 1871) was an Australian pastoralist, landowner and land speculator, one of the wealthiest and most influential men in colonial Victoria in the 1850s and 1860s. His wealth was built on pastoral holdings and land deals and he exercised enormous influence over the colony's parliament.

== Biography ==
Glass was born in Portaferry, County Down, to Thomas Glass, a merchant, and his wife Rachel Pollock.

In 1840, Glass migrated to Victoria and by 1845 he was established as a station agent and merchant. Glass speculated in buying and selling rural landholdings.

In 1853 he married Lucinda Nash, whose father was a Victorian squatter and former captain from the military. Together they had ten children.

Between 1854 and 1856 he built Flemington House in Melbourne, which his main residence until his death there in 1871.

In 1859, he intervened in a petition to government by Aboriginal elders trying to secure land at the junction of the Acheron and Goulburn rivers in Taungurung country, and was successful in their removal to a colder site, Mohican Station, which was not suitable for agricultural land.

In 1862 he was considered the richest man in Victoria, (Note: He was reputed at the time in 1862 to be worth £800,000) but his business empire collapsed in the late 1860s, partly due to droughts.

In 1869, Glass was found guilty of corrupt activities, such as using dummies, and was sentenced to jail. He was saved, however, by Sir William Foster Stawell, the Chief justice of the Supreme Court of Victoria, who argued that the Legislative assembly did not have the right to sentence him. Glass was thus set free; this result was received well by the public, but was the cause of "grave consternation in parliament".

After the deterioration of his health due to liver cancer, Glass died on 15 May 1871 at age 55, in Flemington, Victoria, from an overdose of chloral hydrate.

== Legacy ==
Glass Creek, a minor tributary of the Yarra River that flows through the inner-eastern suburbs of Melbourne, is named after him.
