= City of Camberwell =

Coordinates: 37°50′06″S 145°04′16″E

- Local government area
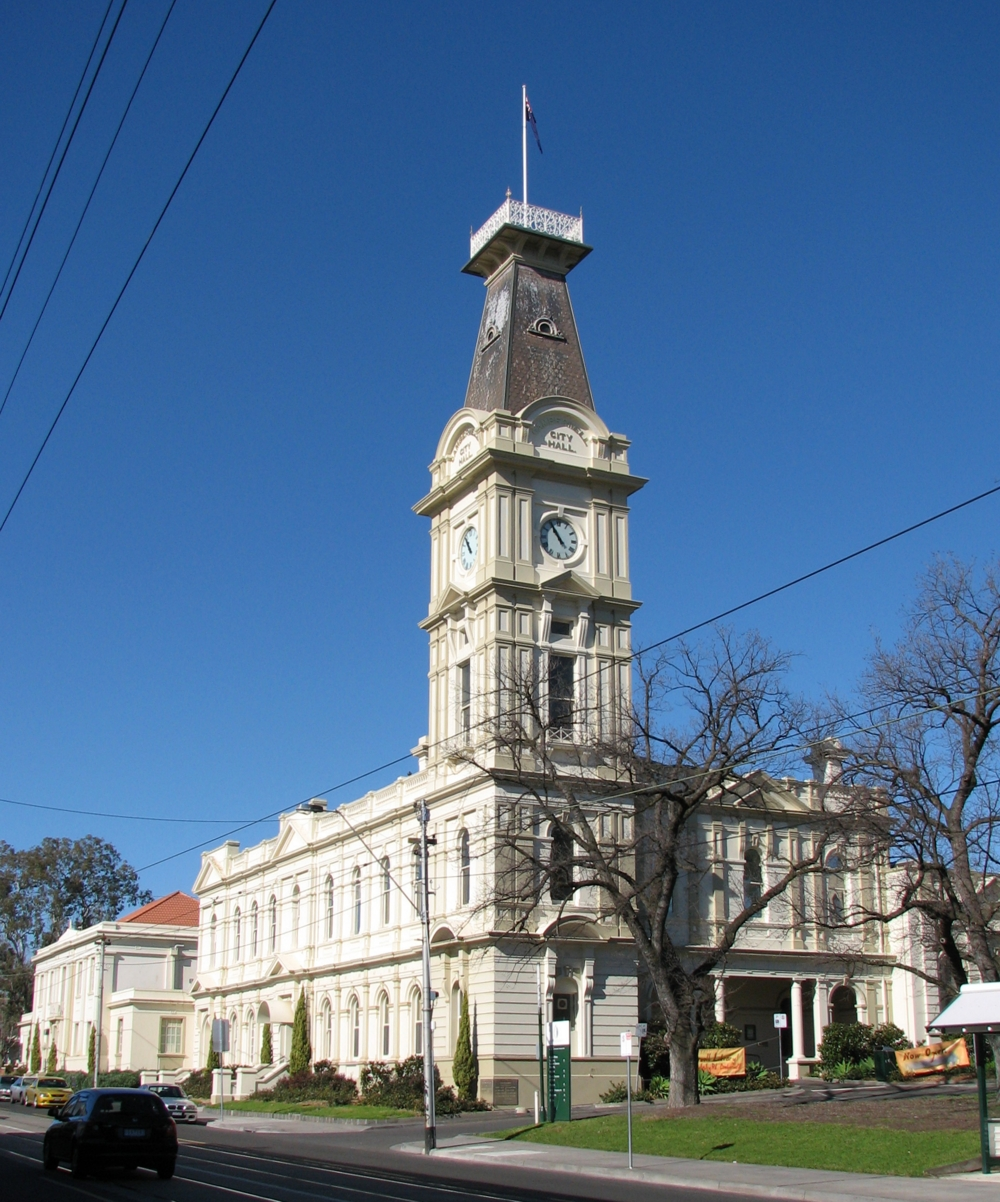
- Camberwell Town Hall

- The extent of the City of Camberwell at its dissolution in 1994
- Country: Australia
- State: Victoria
- Region: Eastern Melbourne
- Established: 1914
- Council seat: Camberwell

Area
  - Total: 36.01 km^{2} (13.90 sq mi)

Population
  - Total: 91,000 (1992)
  - Density: 2,527/km^{2} (6,550/sq mi)
- County: Bourke
LGAs around City of Camberwell
Heidelberg	Doncaster & Templestowe	Doncaster & Templestowe
Kew	City of Camberwell	Box Hill
Hawthorn	Malvern	Waverley

The City of Camberwell was a local government area about 10 kilometres (6 mi) east of Melbourne, the state capital of Victoria, Australia. The city covered an area of 36.01 square kilometres (13.90 sq mi), and existed from 1914 until 1994.

== History ==
Camberwell was first incorporated as the Boroondara Road District on 11 July 1864, which became the Shire of Boroondara on 17 November 1871. At this point, Camberwell consisted of two small settlements; one near the Camberwell Inn and the other to the east, at Hartwell. Much of the shire's area was under cultivation, with a few sites for fine residences at the northern end.

The shire was renamed to the Shire of Camberwell and Boroondara on 16 May 1905. It became a borough on 28 April 1905, a town on 15 May 1906, and was proclaimed a city on 20 April 1914.

The council's pathway to amalgamation was different from most. Following a redevelopment deal for land behind the Burke Road shops, residents rebelled and at the 1988 council elections threw out four councillors who supported the deal replacing them with opponents. The council then backed out of the deal and had over $24 million damages awarded against it. Combined with an investigation which revealed serious governance breaches and other issues, all councillors were sacked and replaced with a commissioner on 22 June 1993.

At the same time, a major reform of local government in Victoria was taking place, and the western part of the City was planned to be merged with the City of Hawthorn and City of Kew to form the City of Riversdale, while the eastern part of the City was planned to be merged with the City of Box Hill to form the City of Whitehorse. Eventually, the decision was made to merge the entirety of Camberwell with Hawthorn and Kew to form the newly created City of Boroondara, which took effect on 22 June 1994.

Council meetings were held at the Camberwell Town Hall, on Camberwell Road, Camberwell. It presently serves as the council seat for the City of Boroondara.

== Suburbs ==
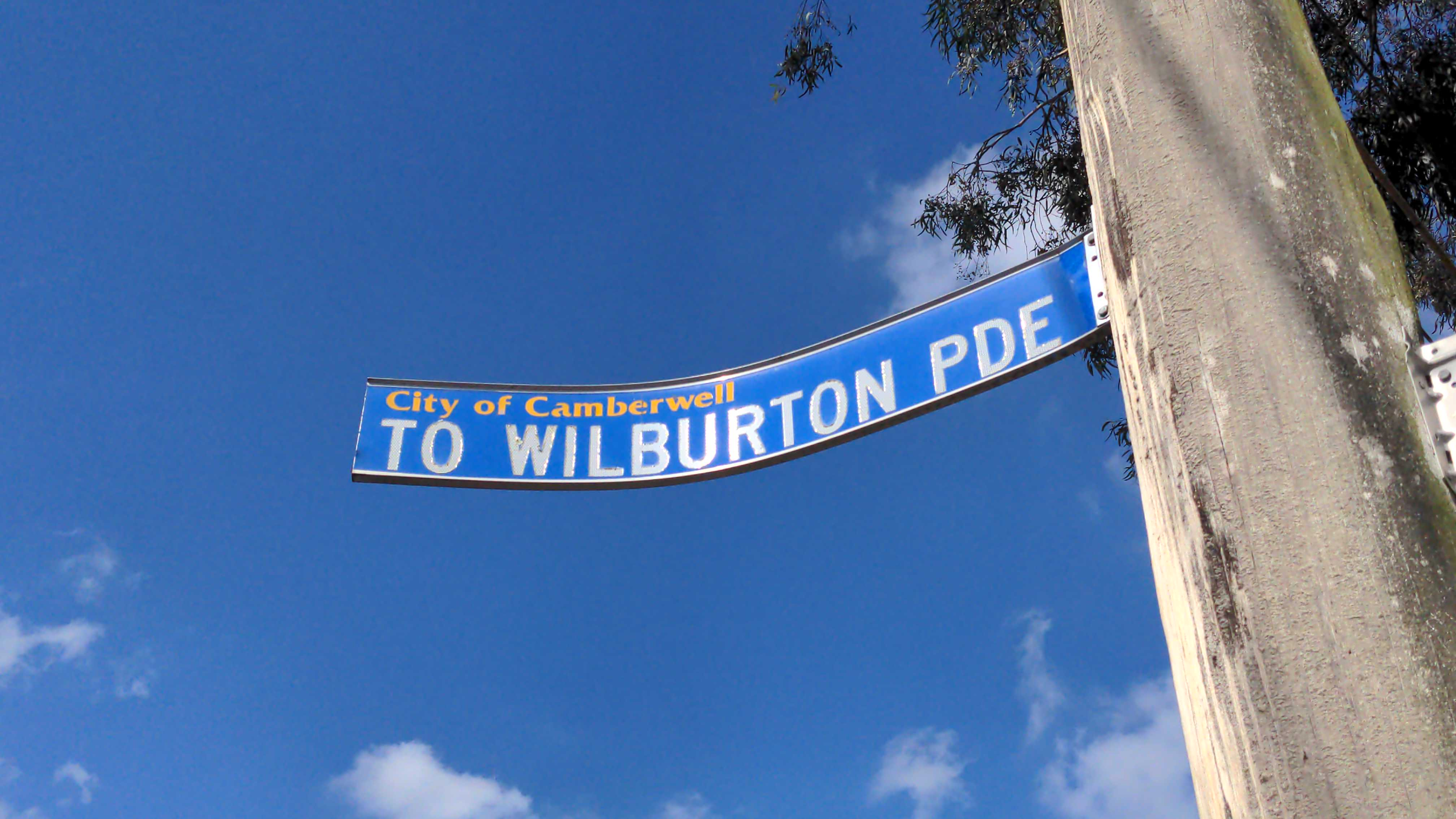
Street sign with City of Camberwell colours and markings in North Balwyn.

- Ashburton
- Balwyn
- Balwyn North
- Burwood (shared with the Cities of Box Hill and Waverley)
- Camberwell*
- Canterbury
- Glen Iris (shared with the Cities of Malvern and Hawthorn)
- Surrey Hills (shared with the City of Box Hill)

* Council seat.

== Population ==
Year	Population
1911	12,551
1933	50,052
1947	76,125
1954	90,397
1958	99,300*
1961	99,353
1966	99,867
1971	98,302
1976	89,865
1981	85,883
1986	83,792
1991	83,799

* Estimate in the 1958 Victorian Year Book.

== Councillors ==
The City of Camberwell was subdivided into four wards on 22 May 1934:

- North East Ward
- North West Ward
- Centre Ward
- South Ward

Prior to 1934, North East and North West were combined as North Ward. Each of the four wards elected three councillors. Unlike present day multi-councillor wards, each election was staggered, with only one councillor per ward up for election at a time, and an election every year.

A number of local parties were active in Camberwell, including the Camberwell Ratepayers' Protection League (CRPL), Glen Iris Progress Association (GIPA), Reform Movement, South Camberwell Progress Association (SCPA) and the Victorian Free Trade and Land Values League.

=== 1905−1934 (three wards) ===
Year	North Ward			Centre Ward			South Ward		
Year	Councillor	Councillor	Councillor	Councillor	Councillor	Councillor	Councillor	Councillor	Councillor
1905	William McBeath (Ind.)	John Maling (Ind.)	George Merey (Ind.)	Andrew Baillieu (Non-Labor)	Robert Beckett (Ind.)	Frederick Read (Ind.)	George Catanach (Ind.)	Edward Dillon (Ind.)	G.A. Green (Ind.)
1906	William McBeath (Ind.)	John Maling (Ind.)	George Merey (Ind.)	Andrew Baillieu (Non-Labor)	Robert Beckett (Ind.)	Frederick Read (Ind.)	George Catanach (Ind.)	Edward Dillon (Ind.)	G.A. Green (Ind.)
1907	William McBeath (Ind.)	John Maling (Ind.)	George Merey (Ind.)	Andrew Baillieu (Non-Labor)	Robert Beckett (Ind.)	Frederick Read (Ind.)	George Catanach (Ind.)	Edward Dillon (Ind.)	Henry Rooks (Ind.)
1908	William McBeath (Ind.)	John Maling (Ind.)	Alfred Bowley (Ind.)	Andrew Baillieu (Non-Labor)	Robert Beckett (Ind.)	Frederick Read (Ind.)	Henry Dench (Ind.)	Edward Dillon (Ind.)	Henry Rooks (Ind.)
1909	William McBeath (Ind.)	John Maling (Ind.)	Alfred Bowley (Ind.)	William Renwick (Free Trade League)	Robert Beckett (Ind.)	Frederick Read (Ind.)	Henry Dench (Ind.)	Edward Dillon (Ind.)	Henry Rooks (Ind.)
1910	William McBeath (Ind.)	John Maling (Ind.)	Alfred Bowley (Ind.)	William Renwick (Free Trade League)	Robert Beckett (Ind.)	Frederick Read (Ind.)	Henry Dench (Ind.)	Edward Dillon (Ind.)	Henry Rooks (Ind.)
1911	William McBeath (Ind.)	John Maling (Ind.)	Alfred Bowley (Ind.)	William Renwick (Free Trade League)	Robert Beckett (Ind.)	Frederick Read (Ind.)	Frederick Vear (Ind.)	Edward Dillon (Ind.)	Henry Rooks (Ind.)
1912	William McBeath (Ind.)	John Maling (Ind.)	Alfred Bowley (Ind.)	William Renwick (Free Trade League)	Robert Beckett (Ind.)	Frederick Read (Ind.)	Frederick Vear (Ind.)	Edward Dillon (Ind.)	Henry Rooks (Ind.)
1913	William McBeath (Ind.)	John Maling (Ind.)	Alfred Bowley (Ind.)	William Renwick (Free Trade League)	Robert Beckett (Ind.)	Frederick Read (Ind.)	Frederick Vear (Ind.)	Edward Dillon (Ind.)	Henry Rooks (Ind.)
1914	William McBeath (Ind.)	John Maling (Ind.)	Vacant (Note: Alfred Bowley was re-elected at the 1914 election, but he was unable to be officially declared elected as he was held up in England due to World War I. His seat was declared vacant and he had to return in November 1914 to re-nominate for a by-election, which he won unopposed.)	William Renwick (Free Trade League)	Robert Beckett (Ind.)	Frederick Read (Ind.)	Frederick Vear (Ind.)	Edward Dillon (Ind.)	Henry Rooks (Ind.)
1914	William McBeath (Ind.)	John Maling (Ind.)	Alfred Bowley (Ind.)	William Renwick (Free Trade League)	Robert Beckett (Ind.)	Frederick Read (Ind.)	Frederick Vear (Ind.)	Edward Dillon (Ind.)	Henry Rooks (Ind.)
1915	William McBeath (Ind.)	John Maling (Ind.)	Alfred Bowley (Ind.)	William Renwick (Free Trade League)	Robert Beckett (Ind.)	Frederick Read (Ind.)	Frederick Vear (Ind.)	Arthur Willison (Ind.)	Henry Rooks (Ind.)
1916	William McBeath (Ind.)	William Nott (Ind.)	Alfred Bowley (Ind.)	William Renwick (Free Trade League)	Robert Beckett (Ind.)	Frederick Read (Ind.)	Frederick Vear (Ind.)	Arthur Willison (Ind.)	Henry Rooks (Ind.)
1917	William McBeath (Ind.)	William Nott (Ind.)	Alfred Bowley (Ind.)	William Renwick (Free Trade League)	Francis Bellemaine (Ind.)	Frederick Read (Ind.)	Frederick Vear (Ind.)	Arthur Willison (Ind.)	Henry Rooks (Ind.)
1918	George Coghill (Ind.)	William Nott (Ind.)	Alfred Bowley (Ind.)	William Renwick (Free Trade League)	Francis Bellemaine (Ind.)	Frederick Read (Ind.)	Frederick Vear (Ind.)	Arthur Willison (Ind.)	Henry Rooks (Ind.)
1919	George Coghill (Ind.)	Albert Hocking (Non-Labor)	Alfred Bowley (Ind.)	William Renwick (Free Trade League)	Francis Bellemaine (Ind.)	Frederick Read (Ind.)	Frederick Vear (Ind.)	Arthur Willison (Ind.)	Henry Rooks (Ind.)
1920	George Coghill (Ind.)	Albert Hocking (Non-Labor)	Alfred Bowley (Ind.)	William Renwick (Free Trade League)	Francis Bellemaine (Ind.)	Frederick Read (Ind.)	Frederick Vear (Ind.)	Arthur Willison (Ind.)	Henry Rooks (Ind.)
1921	Arthur Latham (CRPL/Ind)	Albert Hocking (Non-Labor)	Alfred Bowley (Ind.)	William Renwick (Free Trade League)	Francis Bellemaine (Ind.)	Frederick Read (Ind.)	Frederick Vear (Ind.)	Arthur Willison (Ind.)	Henry Rooks (Ind.)
1922	Arthur Latham (CRPL/Ind)	John Howie (CRPL/Ind)	Alfred Bowley (Ind.)	William Renwick (Free Trade League)	Francis Bellemaine (Ind.)	Frederick Read (Ind.)	Frederick Vear (Ind.)	Arthur Willison (Ind.)	Henry Rooks (Ind.)
1923	Arthur Latham (CRPL/Ind)	John Howie (CRPL/Ind)	Albert Hocking (Non-Labor)	William Renwick (Free Trade League)	Francis Bellemaine (Ind.)	Frederick Read (Ind.)	Frederick Vear (Ind.)	Arthur Willison (Ind.)	Henry Rooks (Ind.)
1924	Arthur Latham (CRPL/Ind)	John Howie (CRPL/Ind)	Albert Hocking (Non-Labor)	T. Purves (Ind.)	Francis Bellemaine (Ind.)	Frederick Read (Ind.)	Frederick Vear (Ind.)	George Wright (Ind.)	Henry Rooks (Ind.)
1925	Arthur Latham (CRPL/Ind)	John Howie (CRPL/Ind)	Albert Hocking (Non-Labor)	T. Purves (Ind.)	Norman Mackay (Ind.)	Frederick Read (Ind.)	Frederick Vear (Ind.)	George Wright (Ind.)	Henry Rooks (Ind.)
1926	Arthur Latham (CRPL/Ind)	John Howie (CRPL/Ind)	Arthur Vine (Ind.)	T. Purves (Ind.)	Norman Mackay (Ind.)	Frederick Read (Ind.)	Henry Witt (Ind.)	George Wright (Ind.)	Henry Rooks (Ind.)
1927	Arthur Latham (CRPL/Ind)	John Howie (CRPL/Ind)	Arthur Vine (Ind.)	Robert McCamish (Ind.)	Norman Mackay (Ind.)	Frederick Read (Ind.)	Henry Witt (Ind.)	Arthur Willison (Ind.)	Henry Rooks (Ind.)
1928	Arthur Latham (CRPL/Ind)	John Howie (CRPL/Ind)	Arthur Vine (Ind.)	Robert McCamish (Ind.)	Norman Mackay (Ind.)	Frederick Read (Ind.)	Henry Witt (Ind.)	Arthur Willison (Ind.)	Henry Rooks (Ind.)
1929	Arthur Latham (CRPL/Ind)	John Howie (CRPL/Ind)	Arthur Vine (Ind.)	Robert McCamish (Ind.)	Norman Mackay (Ind.)	Frederick Read (Ind.)	Henry Witt (Ind.)	Arthur Willison (Ind.)	Henry Rooks (Ind.)
1930	Arthur Latham (CRPL/Ind)	John Howie (CRPL/Ind)	Arthur Vine (Ind.)	Robert McCamish (Ind.)	Norman Mackay (Ind.)	Frederick Read (Ind.)	Henry Witt (Ind.)	Arthur Willison (Ind.)	Henry Rooks (Ind.)
1930	Arthur Latham (CRPL/Ind)	John Howie (CRPL/Ind)	Arthur Vine (Ind.)	Robert McCamish (Ind.)	Norman Mackay (Ind.)	Frederick Read (Ind.)	Henry Witt (Ind.)	Arthur Willison (Ind.)	James Nettleton (SCPA/UAP) (Note: Henry Rooks died in October 1930 and Nettleton won the subsequent by-election in November 1930.)
1931	Arthur Latham (CRPL/Ind)	John Howie (CRPL/Ind)	Arthur Vine (Ind.)	Robert McCamish (Ind.)	Walter Fordham (Reform)	Frederick Read (Ind.)	Henry Witt (Ind.)	Arthur Willison (Ind.)	James Nettleton (SCPA/UAP)
1932	Arthur Latham (CRPL/Ind)	Arthur Hislop (Ind.)	Arthur Vine (Ind.)	Robert McCamish (Ind.)	Walter Fordham (Reform)	Frederick Read (Ind.)	Henry Crawford (GIPA)	Arthur Willison (Ind.)	James Nettleton (SCPA/UAP)
1932	Arthur Latham (CRPL/Ind)	Arthur Hislop (Ind.)	Arthur Vine (Ind.)	Robert McCamish (Ind.)	Walter Fordham (Reform)	Frederick Read (Ind.)	Henry Crawford (GIPA)	William Warner (Ind.) (Note: Arthur Willison died on 11 September 1932 and Warner won the subsequent by-election on 6 October 1932.)	James Nettleton (SCPA/UAP)
1933	Henry Leigh (Ind.)	Arthur Hislop (Ind.)	Arthur Vine (Ind.)	Raymond Barnes (Ind.)	Walter Fordham (Reform)	Frederick Read (Ind.)	Henry Crawford (GIPA)	William Warner (Ind.)	James Nettleton (SCPA/UAP)
1934	Henry Leigh (Ind.)	Arthur Hislop (Ind.)	Arthur Vine (Ind.)	Raymond Barnes (Ind.)	Walter Fordham (Reform)	Frederick Read (Ind.)	David Watson (Ind.)	William Warner (Ind.)	James Nettleton (SCPA/UAP)

=== 1934−1993 (four wards) ===
Year	North East Ward			North West Ward			Centre Ward			South Ward		
Year	Councillor	Councillor	Councillor	Councillor	Councillor	Councillor	Councillor	Councillor	Councillor	Councillor	Councillor	Councillor
1981	Alexander Briggs (Ind.)	James Rumpf (Ind.)	John Cook (Ind.)	William Hocking (Ind.)	Gerry Gaffney (Ind.)	John Martin (Ind.)	Kevin Connolly (Ind.)	Andrew Begg (Ind.)	Bruce Shields (Ind.)			
1982	Alexander Briggs (Ind.)	James Rumpf (Ind.)	John Cook (Ind.)	William Hocking (Ind.)	Gerry Gaffney (Ind.)	John Martin (Ind.)	Kevin Connolly (Ind.)	Mary Drost (Ind.)	Bruce Shields (Ind.)			
1983	Alexander Briggs (Ind.)	James Rumpf (Ind.)	Paul Daley (Ind.)	William Hocking (Ind.)	Gerry Gaffney (Ind.)	John Martin (Ind.)	Richard Pearse (Ind.)	Mary Drost (Ind.)	Bruce Shields (Ind.)			
1984	Alexander Briggs (Ind.)	James Rumpf (Ind.)	Paul Daley (Ind.)	Laraine Beattie (Ind.)	Gerry Gaffney (Ind.)	Wayne Bunte (Ind.)	Richard Pearse (Ind.)	Mary Drost (Ind.)	Colin Bowden (Ind.)			
1985	Alexander Briggs (Ind.)	James Rumpf (Ind.)	Paul Daley (Ind.)	Laraine Beattie (Ind.)	Gerry Gaffney (Ind.)	Wayne Bunte (Ind.)	Richard Pearse (Ind.)	Irene Wegener (Ind.)	Colin Bowden (Ind.)			
1986	Alexander Briggs (Ind.)	James Rumpf (Ind.)	Frank Libman (Ind.)	Laraine Beattie (Ind.)	Gerry Gaffney (Ind.)	Wayne Bunte (Ind.)	Wendy Nettle (Ind.)	Irene Wegener (Ind.)	Colin Bowden (Ind.)			
1987	Alexander Briggs (Ind.)	James Rumpf (Ind.)	Frank Libman (Ind.)	Laraine Beattie (Ind.)	Gerry Gaffney (Ind.)	Wayne Bunte (Ind.)	Joseph Stanley (Ind.)	Irene Wegener (Ind.)	Colin Bowden (Ind.)	David McCloskey (Ind.)	John Jenner (Ind.)	
1988	Alexander Briggs (Ind.)	Judith Harrison (Ind.)	Frank Libman (Ind.)	Laraine Beattie (Ind.)	Gerry Gaffney (Ind.)	Ernest Tucker (Ind.)	Joseph Stanley (Ind.)	Michael Jacombs (Ind.)	Colin Bowden (Ind.)	David McCloskey (Ind.)	John Jenner (Ind.)	
1989	Bryan Steele (Ind.)	Judith Harrison (Ind.)	Sally Brentnall (Ind.)	Laraine Beattie (Ind.)	John Wauchope (Ind.)	Ernest Tucker (Ind.)	Joseph Stanley (Ind.)	Michael Jacombs (Ind.)	Jennie Carey (Ind.)	David McCloskey (Ind.)	John Jenner (Ind.)	
1990	Bryan Steele (Ind.)	Judith Harrison (Ind.)	Carolyn Ingvarson (Ind.)	Laraine Beattie (Ind.)	John Wauchope (Ind.)	Ernest Tucker (Ind.)	Joseph Stanley (Ind.)	Michael Jacombs (Ind.)	Jennie Carey (Ind.)	David McCloskey (Ind.)	John Jenner (Ind.)	Hugh Cameron (Ind.)
1991	Bryan Steele (Ind.)	William Roebuck (Ind.)	Carolyn Ingvarson (Ind.)	Laraine Beattie (Ind.)	John Wauchope (Ind.)	Tracey Brewer (Ind.)	Joseph Stanley (Ind.)	Beth Lee (Ind.)	Jennie Carey (Ind.)	David McCloskey (Ind.)	John Jenner (Ind.)	Hugh Cameron (Ind.)
1992	Dennis Whelan (Ind.)	William Roebuck (Ind.)	Carolyn Ingvarson (Ind.)	Laraine Beattie (Ind.)	Michael van Assche (Ind.)	Tracey Brewer (Ind.)	Bryan Steele (Ind.)	Beth Lee (Ind.)	Jennie Carey (Ind.)	Keith Walter (Ind.)	John Jenner (Ind.)	Hugh Cameron (Ind.)
1993	Dennis Whelan (Ind.)	William Roebuck (Ind.)	Carolyn Ingvarson (Ind.)	Laraine Beattie (Ind.)	Michael van Assche (Ind.)	Tracey Brewer (Ind.)	Bryan Steele (Ind.)	Beth Lee (Ind.)	Jennie Carey (Ind.)	Keith Walter (Ind.)	John Jenner (Ind.)	Hugh Cameron (Ind.)
