= Hislop Park =

- Hislop Park looking west
- Interactive map of Hislop Park
- Location: Melbourne, Australia
- Coordinates: 37.8001449°S 145.080696°E
- Operator: City of Boroondara
- Terrain: Open ovals surrounded by vegetation
- Vegetation: Australian Native
- Public transit: Bus route 285
- Facilities: Playground, sports pavilion

Hislop Park, also known as Hislop Reserve, is a park in the suburb of Balwyn North, Melbourne, Australia. It is situated between Balwyn Road and the North Balwyn Tennis Club in a portion of a valley through which the Glass Creek runs, now largely through underground drains. It has a number of entrances accessible on foot, including from Albury St and Balwyn Road. The park contains three informal ovals, which are used by sporting clubs throughout the year.

== See also ==
- Balwyn North
